= Afonso Pena =

President of Brazil from 1906 to 1909

His Excellency Afonso Pena
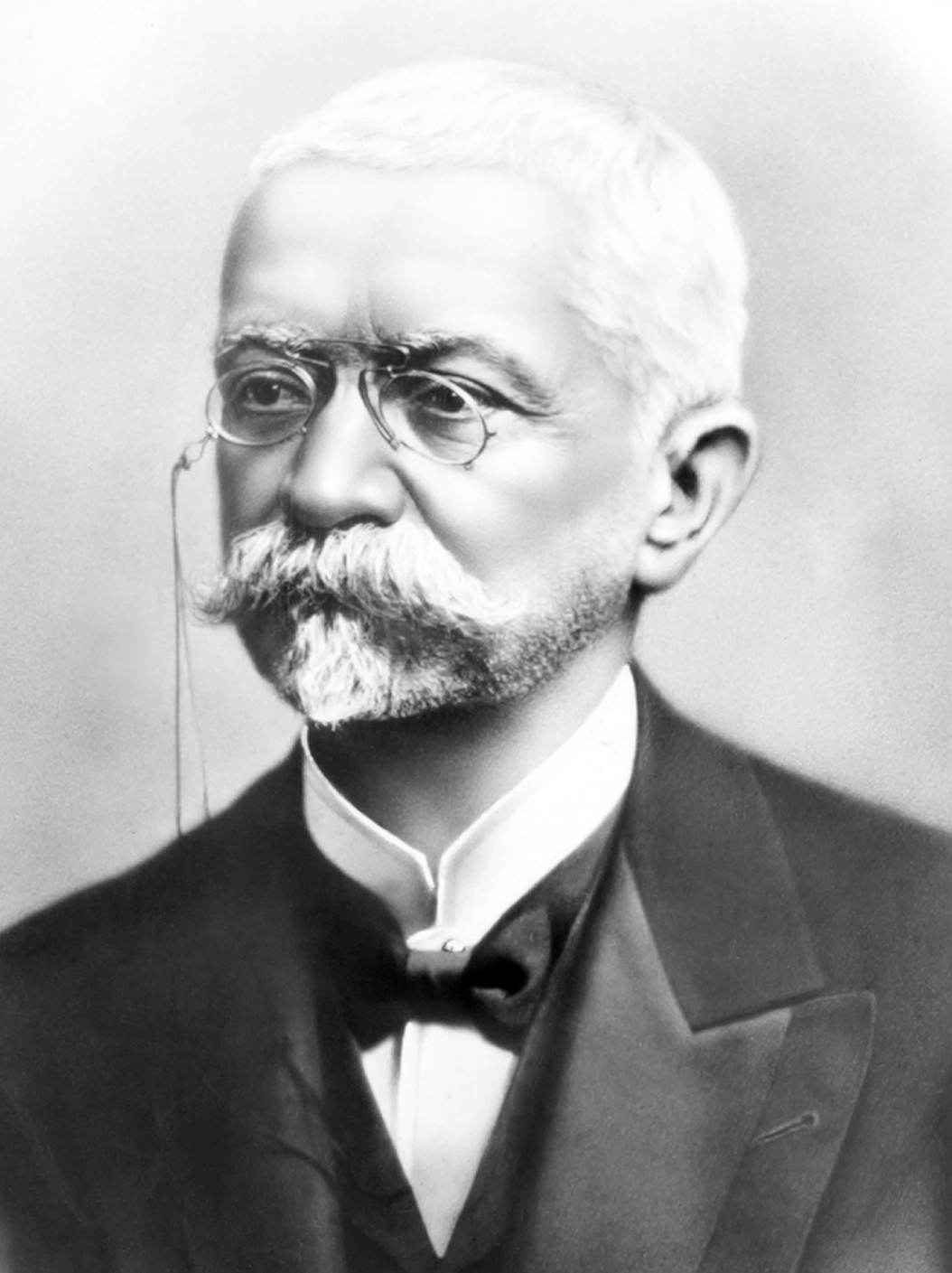
- Official portrait, 1906

6th President of Brazil
- In office 15 November 1906 – 14 June 1909
- Vice President: Nilo Peçanha
- Preceded by: Rodrigues Alves
- Succeeded by: Nilo Peçanha

4th Vice President of Brazil
- In office 23 June 1903 – 15 November 1906
- President: Rodrigues Alves
- Preceded by: Rosa e Silva
- Succeeded by: Nilo Peçanha
Bureaucratic offices
President of the Bank of the Republic
In office 19 October 1895 – 14 November 1898
Preceded by	Rangel Pestana
Succeeded by	Luís Martins do Amaral
Executive offices
President of the Deliberative Council of Belo Horizonte
In office 1901–1902
Preceded by	Office established
Succeeded by	Levindo Lopes
President of Minas Gerais
In office 14 July 1892 – 7 September 1894
Preceded by	Eduardo Ernesto Gama
Succeeded by	Bias Fortes
Ministerial portfolios
1885–1885	Justice
1883–1884	Agriculture
1882–1882	War
Legislative offices
1903–1906	President of the Senate
1900–1903	State Senator
1891–1891	State Senator
1886–1889	General Deputy
1878–1882	General Deputy
1874–1878	Provincial Deputy

Personal details
- Born: 30 November 1847 Santa Bárbara, Minas Gerais, Empire of Brazil
- Died: 14 June 1909 (aged 61) Rio de Janeiro, Federal District, Brazil
- Cause of death: Pneumonia
- Resting place: Afonso Pena Memorial
- Party: Liberal (1874–1889); PRM (1891–1909)
- Spouse: Maria Guilhermina de Oliveira (m. 1875)
- Children: 9, including Afonso Júnior
- Education: Faculty of Law of São Paulo (LL.B., LL.D.)
- Occupation: Lawyer; professor; politician

Military service
- Rank: Brigadier general

Afonso Augusto Moreira Pena (Note: Portuguese pronunciation: [aˈfõsu awˈɡustu moˈɾejɾɐ ˈpenɐ]; In the old spelling: Affonso Augusto Moreira Penna, Lima 2016, p. 2.) (30 November 1847 – 14 June 1909) was a Brazilian lawyer, professor, and politician who served as the sixth president of Brazil, from 1906 until his death in 1909. Pena was elected in 1906, the chosen successor of president Rodrigues Alves. Pena was the first politician from Minas Gerais to win the presidency, ending the series of politicians from São Paulo who had held the presidency since 1894. Before his presidency, he served as the 4th vice president of Brazil, under Rodrigues Alves (1903–1906) after the death of Silviano Brandão. Pena was a monarchist. He was the only member of Emperor Pedro II's cabinet to become president of Brazil and the first Brazilian president to die in office.

Pena was born in Santa Bárbara, Minas Gerais, in 1847. His father, Domingos José Teixeira Pena, was a Portuguese immigrant who owned slaves and a gold mine. After graduating with a law degree from the Faculty of Law of São Paulo and becoming a doctor at the same institution, Pena returned to his hometown, where he began to work as an attorney, later moving to Barbacena and becoming known for defending slaves. His political career began in 1874 when he joined the Liberal Party and was elected to the Provincial Assembly of Minas Gerais. In 1878, he was elected general deputy for Minas Gerais. In the succeeding years he reconciled legislative work with some periods occupying ministries—Ministry of War (1882), Agriculture (1883–1884), and Justice (1885).

After the proclamation of the Republic, Pena withdrew from public life; however, he was soon called upon to join the Republican Party of Minas Gerais (PRM) and run for the State Senate in order to help with the creation of the new state constitution. Pena was elected to the position in 1891 and presided over the commission that was tasked with drafting the constitution. After resigning his position in the Senate, Pena was elected president of Minas Gerais by consensus among the state's various political factions, serving from 1892 to 1894. It was during his administration that Belo Horizonte was established as the future state capital (which at that time was Ouro Preto) and the Faculty of Law of Minas Gerais was founded. After presiding over the Bank of the Republic from 1895 to 1898, Pena became vice president to Rodrigues Alves in 1903. As vice president, he also served as president of the Senate.

Pena became president of Brazil in 1906 after an uncontested single-candidate election. He was the first Brazilian president to intervene in the coffee economy, putting into practice the Taubaté Agreement, after which the federal government began to buy surplus production in order to maintain the high price of coffee in international markets. Pena's government promoted the expansion of railways and immigration, the modernization and reorganization of the Brazilian Army with the introduction of the Sortition Law, and the rearmament of the Brazilian Navy, with the acquisition of new ships. Pena also supported Cândido Rondon's expeditions in the Amazon rainforest, which linked the region to Rio de Janeiro by telegraph. In the international sphere, Brazil took part in the Hague Convention of 1907, with a delegation led by Ruy Barbosa, and settled border disputes with neighboring countries. Tensions with Argentina reached a peak due to Brazil's acquisition of the Minas Geraes-class battleships, which provoked the South American dreadnought race, and both countries hovered on the brink of war. In his final years in office, Pena unsuccessfully tried to nominate David Campista as his successor. Pena died from severe pneumonia in 1909 and was succeeded by Nilo Peçanha.

== Early life and education ==
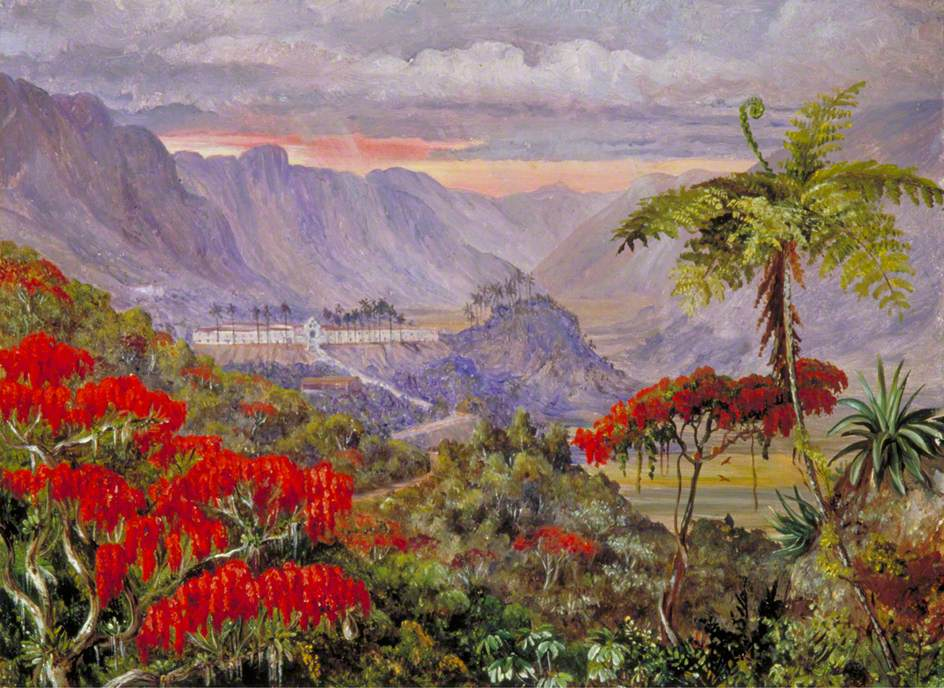
The Caraça School, by Marianne North, c. 1873

Born on 30 November 1847 in Santa Bárbara do Mato Dentro—currently the municipality of Santa Bárbara, Minas Gerais—Afonso Pena was the seventh of twelve children of Domingos José Teixeira Penna and Anna Moreira Teixeira Penna; being his mother's firstborn, as she was his father's second wife. Domingos was a Portuguese immigrant from São Salvador da Ribeira de Pena (also spelled "da Penha") and in the new country he owned land, a gold mine, and a large number of slaves. Domingos' father, Manuel José de Carvalho Penha (b. 1769), was supposedly the first to adopt the name "Pena".

While initially pursuing a military career in the National Guard, Domingos later abandoned it; his earnings were sufficient to provide the family with a standard of living described as "comfortable". Afonso's mother came from an influential family in Santa Bárbara politics. Thus, Afonso's family was part of Minas Gerais' elite. As a child, he was taken care of by the nursemaid Ambrosina, a slave. Pena would often accompany his father to the gold mines in Brumado and São Gonçalo do Rio Abaixo. According to José Anchieta da Silva, Pena was an early abolitionist who fought for better working conditions for his father's slaves; on one occasion, upon seeing a pregnant slave working in a mine, Pena spoke to the overseer, after which it was decided that pregnant slaves would no longer work in the mines from the sixth month of pregnancy onwards, and their only task would be "to cook or wash clothes".

After receiving his early education at home from private tutors, Pena went on to study at the Caraça School in 1857, at the age of ten. The school, isolated from major urban centers, was maintained by the Lazarist priests, and Pena's father was one of its most prominent creditors. At the school, he studied theology, ethics, philosophy, mathematics, geometry, history, rhetoric, and foreign languages. Pena finished his studies at the Caraça School on 16 January 1864 and later moved to the city of São Paulo to study at the Faculty of Law in 1866, which, together with the Faculty of Law of Recife, formed the country's intelligentsia at the time.

=== At the Faculty of Law ===
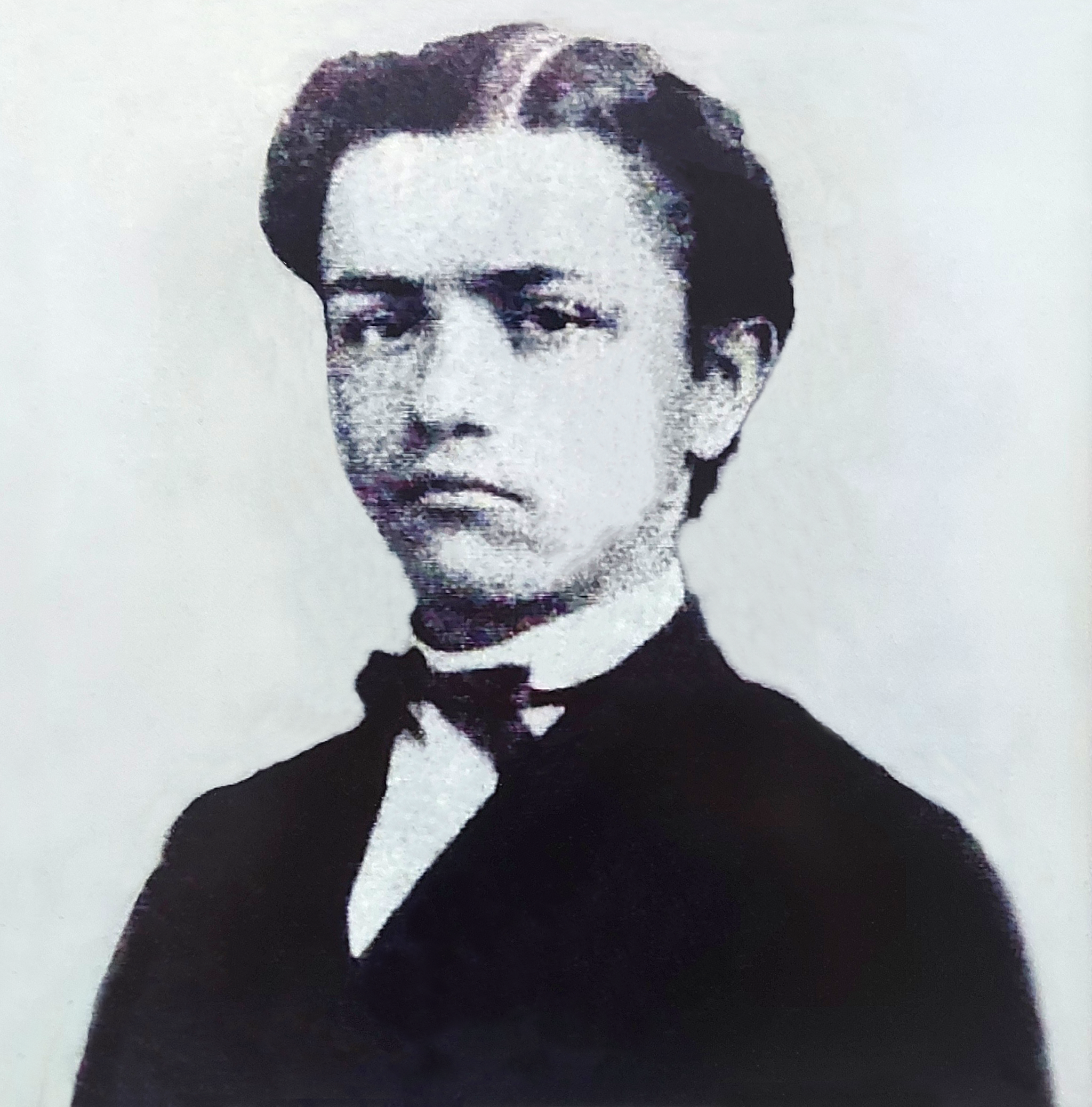
Pena in his youth, unknown date

During his studies at the Faculty of Law, Pena was a colleague of Ruy Barbosa, Bias Fortes, Joaquim Nabuco, Castro Alves, and Rodrigues Alves. In 1870 Pena became, alongside Rodrigues Alves, an editor in chief of the faculty's journal Imprensa Acadêmica after a close election. There was supposed to be only one editor in chief, but the election unexpectedly ended in a tie. It was then agreed to include both Pena and Alves as chief editors. The journal, focused on debating academic and political issues, was influenced by French authors such as Victor Hugo, Honoré de Balzac, and Émile Zola.

Although not a freemason, he joined the Bucha in the Faculty of Law—a secret (Note: The society's secrecy was treated seriously by its members. After Afonso Pena's death, his son Afonso Júnior found in his father's belongings "a package of papers, carefully tied, with the following note: 'Papers that only Álvaro can know of'". As Álvaro, Afonso Júnior's brother, had already died, he took the papers to Raul Soares, who he knew was a member of the Bucha. After examining the papers, Soares closed the room's doors and windows and asked Afonso Júnior to swear never to tell anyone what he had seen. Afonso Júnior swore it, declaring "all the more readily as I had understood nothing of what was written there in a secret language", Horta 1994, p. 19.) student society of a liberal, abolitionist, and republican nature, which was inspired by the German Burschenschaft associations and founded by professor Julius Frank—and became chief of Bucha's "General Communion". This association helped students who could not afford to pay for their studies. Pena maintained contact with other Bucha members, even after finishing his studies at the faculty.

Pena was an adherent of natural law and an opponent of positivism, as he was a fervent Catholic and sympathetic to the monarchy in Brazil. His ideas distanced him from the Brazilian positivists, who defended the separation of Church and State and the creation of a military republic in the country. Two other movements divided Brazil during his years at the Faculty of Law: abolitionism and republicanism. Pena supported the former but not the latter, refusing to sign the 1870 Republican Manifesto, as he believed Brazil was not ready for a change of regime.

=== Early law career ===
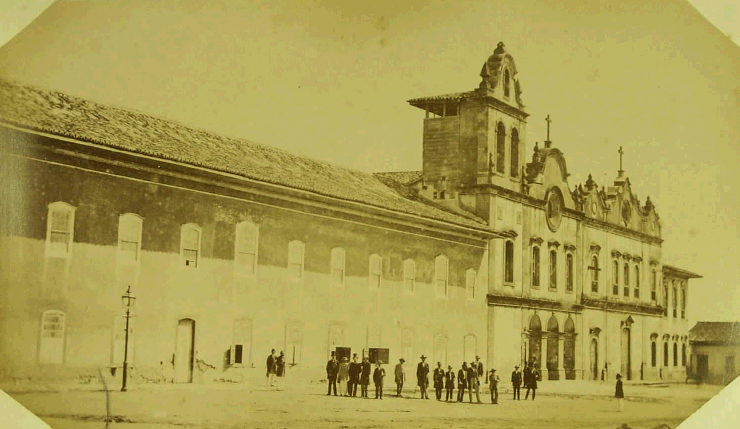
The Faculty of Law in 1862, by Militão Augusto de Azevedo

Pena graduated with a Law degree on 23 October 1870. (Note: Or 25 November, according to Lacombe 1986, p. 28.) He became a Doctor of Law at the same institution on 29 August 1871 – the only one in his class – after defending his thesis Letra de Câmbio on 19 June of that year. Upon receiving his doctorate, Pena gave a speech in which he expressed his abolitionist views, concluding that "the entire country is agitated to solve, in accordance with the principles of justice, the great question of the centuries – the emancipation of an enslaved race". After turning down an invitation to teach at his alma mater, he returned to Minas Gerais, where he began to work as an attorney, at first practicing law in his hometown and later in Barbacena.

There he became known for defending slaves in court and even for helping them escape, for which he came close to being repported to the authorities in Rio de Janeiro by a local military officer. Despite this, he was concerned with the economic effects that immediate abolition could have; for this reason, he was in favor of compensating slave owners after abolition and also supported immigration as a way to replace slave labor. This brought him closer to other politicians of his time, especially the conservatives, who, according to Cláudia Viscardi, were "responsible for the progressive delay of the end of slavery in Brazil".

=== Marriage and family ===
Afonso Pena married Maria Guilhermina de Oliveira on 23 January 1875. The couple went on their honeymoon to Rio de Janeiro, where they met emperor Pedro II. Guilhermina was the daughter of João Fernandes de Oliveira Pena, the Viscount of Carandaí, and the niece of Honório Hermeto Carneiro Leão, the Marquis of Paraná, one of the most prominent politicians in the Empire of Brazil. They had nine children, including Afonso Júnior, who was later Minister of Justice and Internal Affairs under President Artur Bernardes and a member of the Brazilian Academy of Letters, and Octávio Moreira Pena, an engineer who carried out several public works in Rio de Janeiro, including the landfill that gave rise to the Urca neighborhood.

Pena inherited properties from his parents, including a gold mine, which he sold by the end of the 19th century, as its gold production had declined. He also had a textile factory, which he sold in the 1900s, as well as several investments in Brazil and abroad. In order to better manage his investments, Pena was helped by João Ribeiro de Oliveira Sousa, who became president of Crédito Real, then Minas Gerais' largest bank, on Pena's recommendation.

== Political rise ==
=== Member of parliament (1874–1882) ===
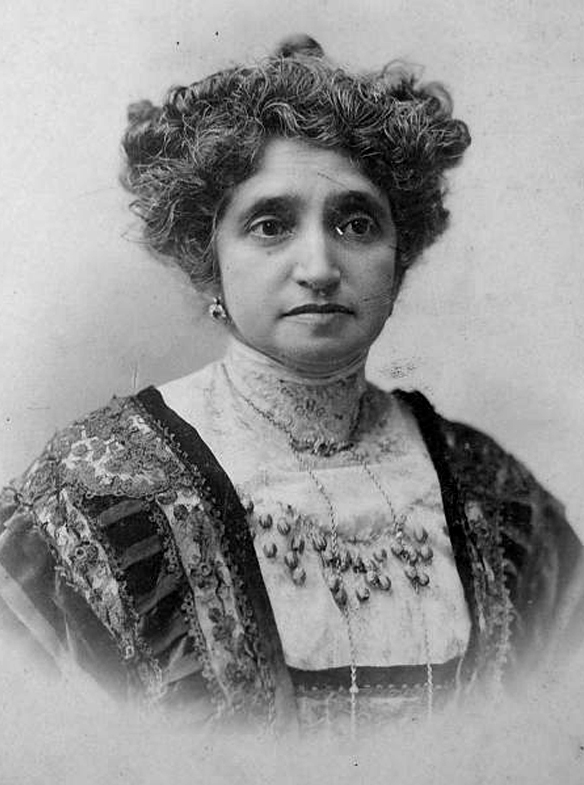
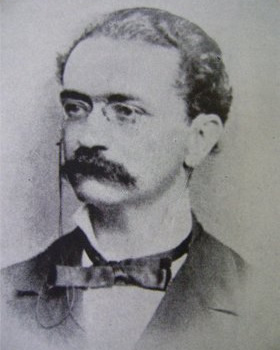
Maria Guilhermina and Afonso Pena aged about 35, 1882

Afonso Pena joined the Liberal Party in 1874 and began his political career that same year, when he was elected provincial deputy to the 20th legislature in Minas Gerais. (Note: The provincial deputy term lasted two years, Guedes 2016, pp. 43–45.) He remained in the Provincial Assembly until 1878, being successively reelected to the 21st (1876–1877) and 22nd (1878–1879) legislatures, when he was elected general deputy, beginning his term in the Chamber of Deputies in the 17th legislature (1878–1881). Pena's political career was initially sponsored by Martinho Campos and Afonso Celso, two prominent politicians who helped him in his rise in the Liberal Party.

The liberals' rise to power in 1878 came after a decade in ostracism (the so-called Conservative Decade), being tasked by the emperor with carrying out an electoral reform to establish direct voting. The party's rise to power had not resulted from its own political strength, and Pena warned his fellow Liberals of its unstable position. The new liberal prime minister, João Lins Cansanção, was out of step with the party's mainstream, leaving a pessimistic impression on Pena. The issue of direct voting, the main point of the liberal program, was the subject of debates about which path should be adopted: a constitutional reform or the approval of an ordinary law. Most liberals were in favor of a constitutional reform, which would require deliberation by the Senate, where there was a conservative majority. Pena was against this path, joining a dissident wing within the party.

Cansanção fell on 28 March 1880, as desired by Pena. His successor, also liberal José Antônio Saraiva, then decided to carry out the electoral reform by means of an ordinary law. The Saraiva Law, as it became known, was finally approved on 9 January 1881, introducing direct voting in Brazil, the voter's license, and allowing non-Catholics to vote. The number of electors in the country was expected to grow considerably, giving more legitimacy to elections. However, on 13 August 1881, shortly before the next elections, an executive decree was issued regulating the issuance of the voter's license by introducing a number of requirements, including literacy, and so the number of people eligible to vote fell considerably. (Note: In 1870 there were more than a million voters in the country, a number that fell to just 150 thousand in the 1881 electoral registration, Lacombe 1986, p. 92.) The prime minister who followed, Martinho Campos, also a liberal, despite declaring himself a "slaveholder to the core", did not seek to advance the liberal agenda, but attempted to revise the electoral regulation in order to expand the electorate, which led to his fall by a motion of no confidence. Dissatisfied with the reduction in the number of voters, Pena later criticized the law, declaring that "an electorate of 142,000 citizens cannot be the electorate of this Empire, which has 12 million inhabitants".

=== Minister of State (1882–1885) ===
In 1882, Pena took a leave of absence from his position as general deputy, beginning his experience in executive positions after being appointed Minister of War in the cabinet of prime minister Martinho Campos at the age of 35. Pena was one of only two civilians to hold the office, the other being Pandiá Calógeras. Despite being a civilian, he was well received by the military, as he defended their freedom of speech and military reforms, which included the army's professionalization. Pena was successively reelected to the 18th (1881–1884), 19th (1885), and 20th (1886–1889) legislatures in the Chamber of Deputies. During this period, he defended greater municipal autonomy, progressively aligning himself with political and economic liberalism, for which he also supported State non-intervention in the economy.

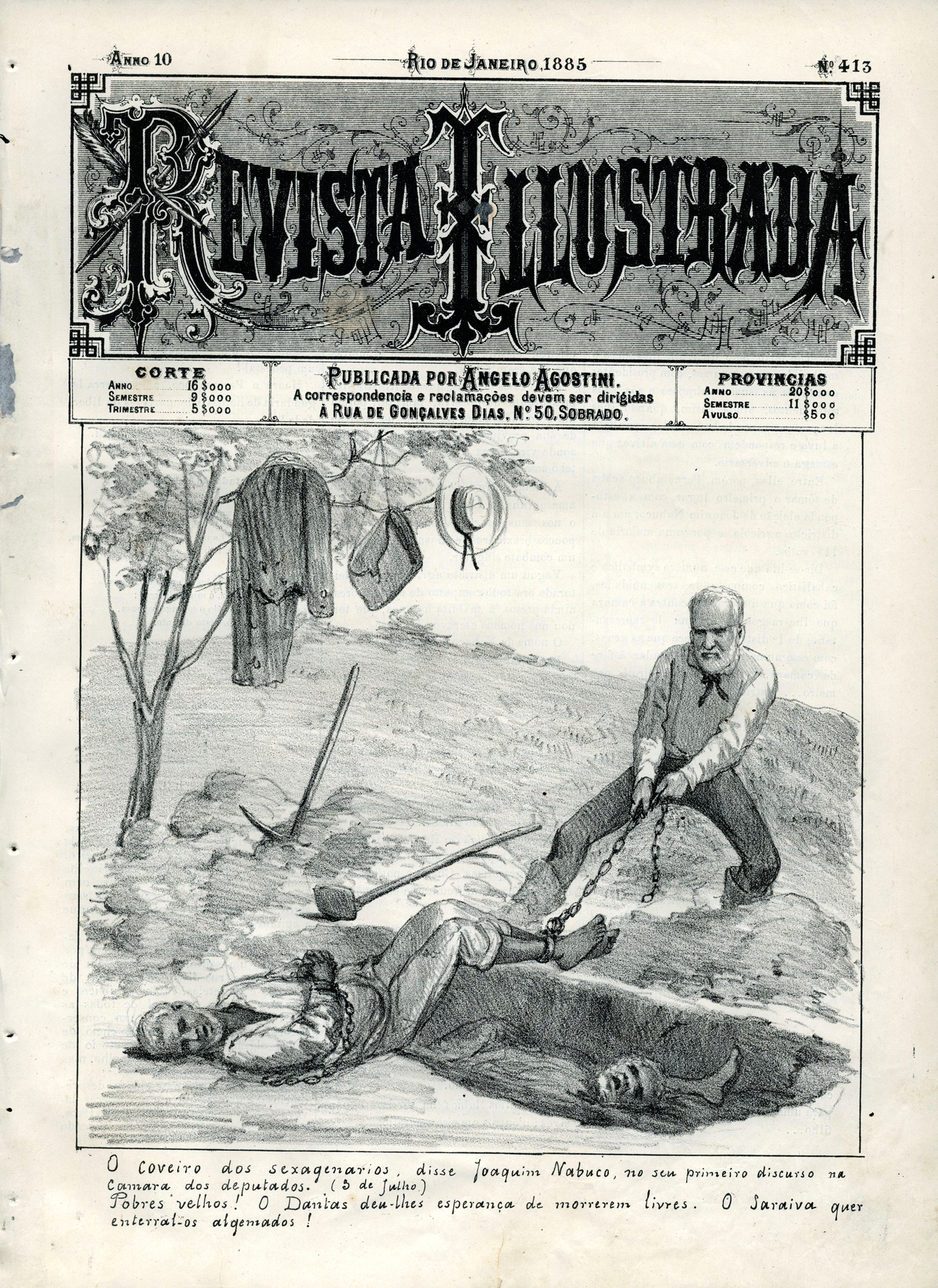
Revista Illustrada in 1885 satirizes the Saraiva-Cotegipe Law by depicting Prime Minister José Antônio Saraiva burying old slaves who died before they could be set free

In the following years, he was Minister of Agriculture, Commerce and Public Works in the cabinet of Lafayette Rodrigues (1883–1884), and Interior and Justice in the cabinet of José Antônio Saraiva (1885). As Minister of Justice, Pena overhauled the police and improved the prison system; in this office he was also one of the signatories of the Saraiva-Cotegipe Law, which granted freedom to slaves aged 60 and over. However, he reinforced the capture of fugitive slaves and prosecuted the abolitionists who helped them. Saraiva fell on 20 August 1885, being succeeded by the conservative João Maurício Vanderlei, the Baron of Cotegipe, thus ending seven years of liberal rule (the Liberal Septennium) and Pena's stay in the executive.

=== In the opposition (1886–1889) ===
Cotegipe dissolved the liberal chamber and called for new elections, which were held on 15 January 1886. Afonso Pena was elected in his 3rd district with 615 votes out of 863 electors. Minas Gerais elected 11 liberals out of 20 deputies, the largest liberal caucus in the Chamber of Deputies. In opposition, Pena became a staunch critic of the government, monitoring and analyzing all its actions: the signing of railway contracts, public works, soil surveys in Rio de Janeiro, etc. In Américo Lacombe's words, everything was "examined and debated".

By 1886, however, the main issue was the so-called "Military Question", a series of incidents that began in 1884 between the military and the civilian authorities. News of the incidents was alarming. On 30 September, Pena requested explanations about an incident in Rio Grande do Sul, where officers and students from the Military School demanded that the provincial president, Deodoro da Fonseca, fire a teacher from the Normal School who was the editor of a newspaper. Fonseca complied. Despite being a monarchist, he was gradually being co-opted by republicans. Pena did not understand Cotegipe's attitude towards the incidents. The prime minister believed that repressive measures would be inappropriate. For Pena, however, Cotegipe's passivity encouraged military insubordination. By 1887, the military and republicans were openly plotting a coup d'état.

Pena's stance on slavery became ambiguous. It is not known for certain whether he owned slaves. (Note: "At the same time that he proclaimed himself an abolitionist and did not, supposedly, have any slaves on his property, he feared that immediate manumission would result in irreversible economic damage to the owners", Viscardi, p. 2.) His political prominence made him abandon his youthful abolitionist ideals, as he became increasingly concerned with the economic impacts of abolition and sought to be loyal to his party. Pena followed his party's line in parliamentary debates over slavery; Minas Gerais' politicians feared abolition could harm the province's economy, which largely relied on coffee. In any case, he later voted in favor of the Golden Law, which finally abolished slavery in Brazil in 1888, but expressed his concerns regarding the effects the law would have. On 24 October, in a long speech criticizing the João Alfredo cabinet, which had succeeded Cotegipe, Pena examined the consequences of abolition and drew attention to the rise of republicanism among the conservative classes, as "it is certain that many see in the new regime a means of extorting the compensation [for their freed slaves] that they were unable to obtain under this regime".

=== Fall of the empire ===
João Alfredo was succeeded by Afonso Celso on 7 June 1889, thus ending Pena's stay in the opposition. Due to his proximity to Afonso Celso, Pena had been appointed a member of the Council of State by emperor Pedro II the previous year. Despite criticizing nominations based on political affinity, even committing himself to fighting them, Pena could not entirely avoid the practice, so as not to harm his political career. The liberals, now once again in power, had met on 23 May 1889 at the headquarters of the newspaper Tribuna Liberal where they devised a broad reform program and were determined to carry it out. It included turning the country into a federal monarchy and the adoption of a civil code, as the country lacked one. As was usual, the new prime minister dissolved the chamber of deputies and called for new elections.

In order to draft the country's first civil code, the government created a commission and Pena was appointed one of its members. Pena wrote the chapter pertaining to inheritance. The Liberals' electoral success encouraged Afonso Celso, who was oblivious to the growing deterioration in the military situation. Landowners had withdrawn their support to the government en masse after abolition and the prime minister drew up a loan plan for agriculture in an attempt to gain their sympathy. Afonso Celso defined his program as "making the Republic useless". Taking advantage of high coffee prices and favorable results in the balance of payments, the minister embarked on an ambitious economic program. The idea was to modernize the country in an attempt to save the monarchy.

Afonso Celso implemented a network of issuing banks, with the aim of stimulating the economy, which led to unbridled speculation, known as the "Encilhamento". A large number of new companies were founded, whose capital almost reached that of all companies founded since the birth of the Brazilian Empire. In the words of Américo Lacombe, "there was a terrible contrast between the government's euphoria, celebrating the electoral victory and the liveliness of the business world. While the military class, especially the young ones, indoctrinated by the positivist agenda, were dissatisfied".

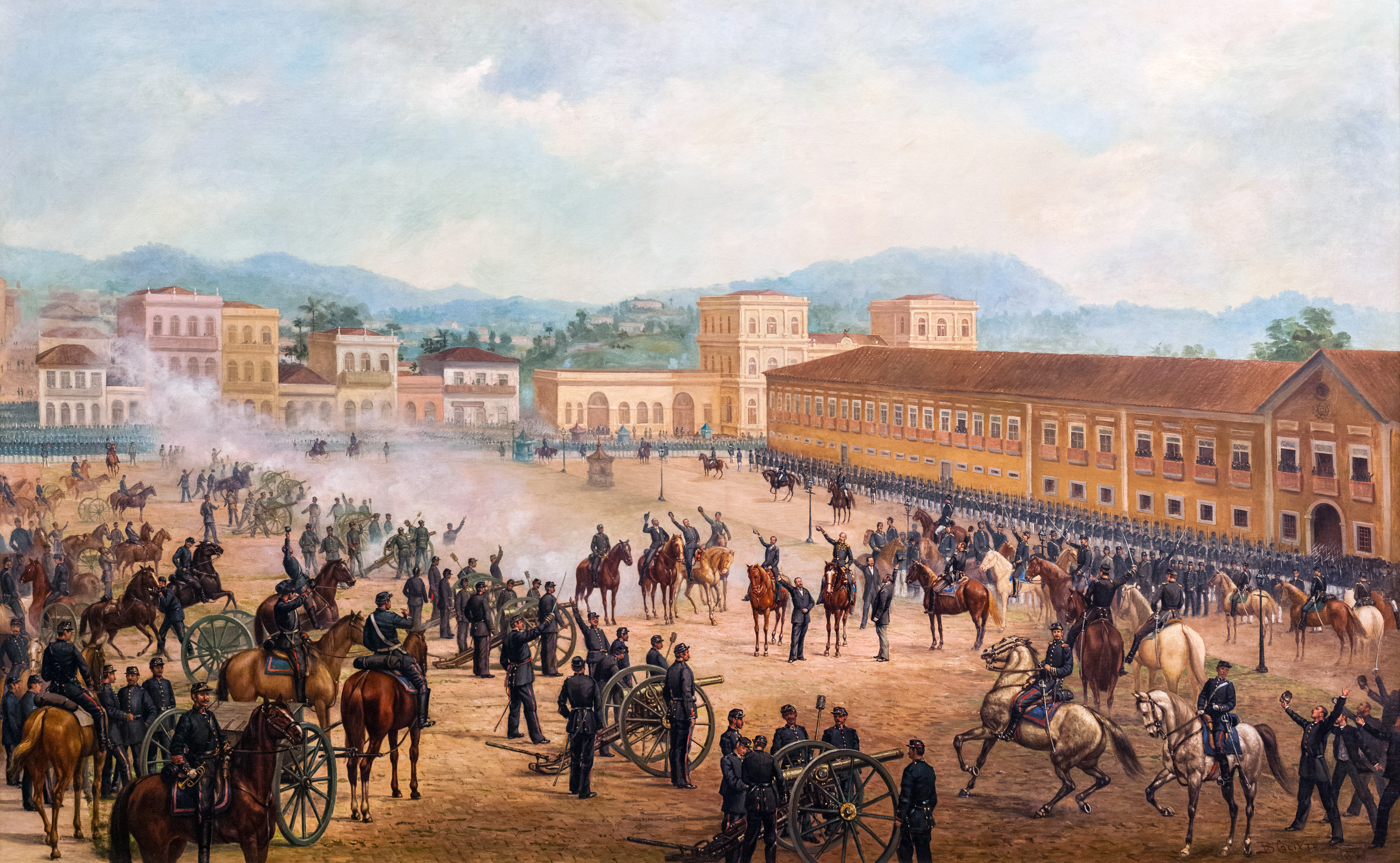
Proclamation of the Republic, by Benedito Calixto, 1893

On the night of 14 November 1889, low-ranking officers and students from the Military School of Praia Vermelha rebelled. They left their barracks to attack the government. Afonso Celso took refuge in the Army Headquarters. At dawn on the 15th, the rebels went to get Benjamin Constant to lead them. Once informed of what was happening, Deodoro da Fonseca left his home, despite being seriously ill, and went to lead the troops, who positioned their cannons against the Army HQ. There was no resistance. A provisional government was organized at night. It was the end of the monarchy in the country and the beginning of the First Brazilian Republic.

The work on the civil code was interrupted. That same day, Pena sent a telegram to Afonso Celso, who had been arrested, expressing his solidarity. Pena was pessimistic about the provisional government, later declaring "what we have [now] is not a republic—it is pure militarism". After the republic was proclaimed, he returned to Barbacena and withdrew from public life, saddened by the banishment of emperor Pedro II. He thought about abandoning politics to resume his law career. Like many other monarchist politicians of his time, he ended up adopting a "resigned acceptance" of the new regime, as he feared any reaction could lead to a civil war. Pena remained a convinced monarchist and continued to defend the emperor, whom he considered to be a man of "great knowledge and deeds". He had become one of the most prestigious politicians of the Empire.

=== State Senator (1891) ===
The new republican government, headed by Deodoro da Fonseca, appointed Cesário Alvim as president of Minas Gerais. Alvim had not joined the republican movement until late, which caused dissatisfaction among Minas Gerais' so-called "historical republicans", who felt betrayed. (Note: At the time the republic was proclaimed in Brazil, many politicians divided into two currents: the "historical republicans", that is, the ones that had supported a republic before it was proclaimed, and the "adesistas", the ones that only joined the republican cause at the last moment. The most notable historical republican in Minas Gerais had been João Pinheiro, Mari & Filho 2019, pp. 465–466; Viscardi, pp. 5–6.) Pena's retirement from politics, however, did not last long: as he was famous for being a conciliatory politician, he was invited by the newly founded Republican Party of Minas Gerais (PRM) to be a candidate for the State Senate, and help the Minas Gerais' Constituent Assembly, in 1891.

Pena was then elected to the 1st legislature of the State Senate (1891–1895), helping Minas Gerais transition from province to state by easing its political conflicts and presiding over the commission that was tasked with drafting the state's constitution. As president of the commission, Pena opposed an initial constitutional draft sent to the assembly by the state government, as he deemed it overly centralizing; he argued that the draft should be rejected as it was "inspired by a unitary political model, like the monarchical regime that had just failed". The constitutional draft provided for the election of the governor by the State Congress and the election of senators by a "special electorate", which Pena opposed. The very existence of the Minas Gerais senate, thus forming a bicameral legislature, was disputed, with David Campista being its leading opponent. Campista accused the senate of "disguising aristocratic tendencies". In response, Afonso Pena argued that the senate was a "moderating power" and improved the legislative process, without which the lower house would "reach omnipotence".

"To these young people, full of talent and deep convictions, who have so ardently spoken on this assembly, I will give the advice of great tolerance, of great impartiality in the assessment of political acts and facts. In political life, we can very rarely carry forward the ideas of our spirit in all their purity."
Pena's address to the Constituent Assembly, 1891.

The final constitutional draft, enacted on 15 June 1891 with several amendments proposed by Pena, granted more autonomy for the municipalities, as he had envisioned years before, and established a bicameral legislature, with the senators being elected by direct voting; it also provided for the creation of a new state capital to replace Ouro Preto. The change of the capital from Ouro Preto was the most controversial point; Pena was in favor of moving the capital and proposed to postpone the decision until a commission of specialists presented the possible sites. During his speeches in the constituent assembly, Pena had adopted a conciliatory tone toward the more radical republican wings and the old monarchists, who fiercely debated the issue.

As state senator, Pena also clashed with the Leopoldina Railway Company, which was the largest railway in Minas Gerais, approving a measure that forced the company to abide by its contract obligations or else lose its concession to operate. He also proposed appointing members of the judiciary through competitive examinations, instead of political loyalty, as had been the case until then. This stance was in line with his preference for personal ability, although it is not possible to say he did not make nominations based on political criteria rather than individual merit during his political career. This preference would later be reflected in his presidential cabinet.

Pena defended the expansion of railways in Minas Gerais and the organization of public education. He was against what he called empregomania, that is, students' excessive preference, at the time, for public jobs, which consumed public finances. This was also the opinion of other politicians at the time. For this reason, he defended technical education. In his own words:

Empregomania is an endemic disease in our country. What orientation do parents give their children? They send them to law, engineering, and medical schools, and many of them merely await placement in public administration jobs, thereby stifling many activities. I believe that by establishing technical education, parents' attention will be drawn to guiding their children's careers toward attending technical institutes. This would yield the following result: after young people have acquired knowledge of the subjects taught in these institutes, instead of directing their efforts toward public employment, they would apply them to the state's most important industries, such as agriculture, extraction, and manufacturing.

=== President of Minas Gerais (1892–1894) ===
==== The threatened republic ====
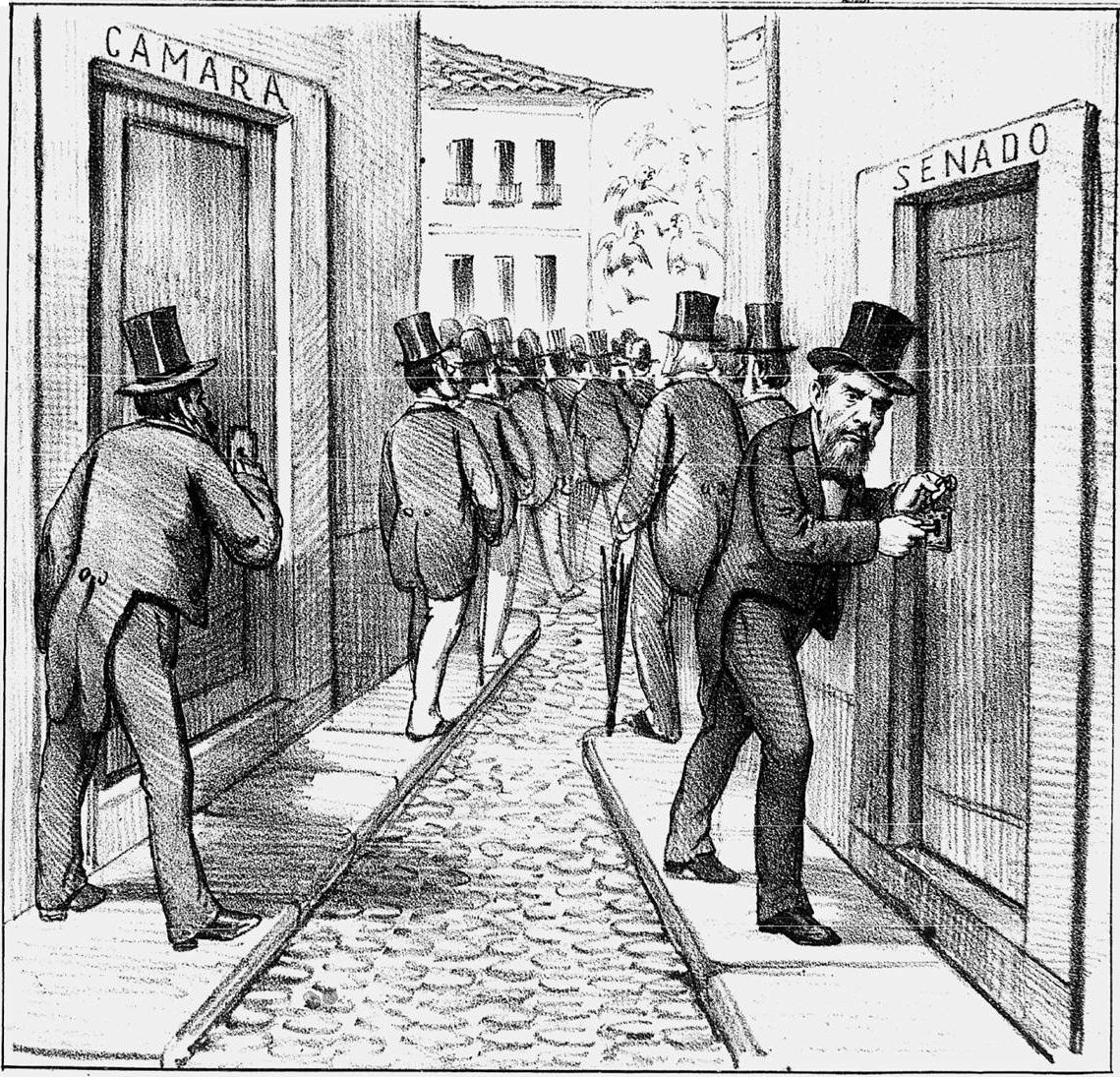
The dissolution of Congress, Revista Illustrada, 1892

The first years of the republic in Brazil were plagued by disputes and political instability. The Brazilian Empire had been overthrown in a bloodless military coup, but the next decade was a bloody one. Deodoro da Fonseca dissolved Congress on 3 November 1891 and Pena resigned his position in the state senate in protest, arguing that "the coexistence of constitutional powers with the state of dictatorship proclaimed by president Deodoro da Fonseca was incompatible". This act distanced him from Alvim and gave him the support of most of Minas Gerais' elite. Tensions were high in the federal government and Deodoro ended up resigning on 23 November 1891, being succeeded by vice president Floriano Peixoto.

Upon taking office, Peixoto reconvened Congress and began a process of deposing the state governors who had supported Deodoro da Fonseca. This could take place through a federal military intervention with the justification of guaranteeing law and order. In Minas Gerais, the position of Alvim, who had supported Deodoro, became untenable. Alvim faced constant pressure from the radical republicans, and even a separatist threat, when the city of Campanha, in southern Minas Gerais, proclaimed itself the capital of a new state, Minas do Sul. (Note: The separatist movement, openly supported by Floriano Peixoto and minister Fernando Lobo, failed when the municipal elections took place normally and its governing board fell apart, despite the presence of general Marciano de Magalhães, tasked with supporting the movement, Lacombe 1986, pp. 156–157.) Knowing that a federal intervention would be inevitable, Alvim resigned in February 1892. Pena then emerged as the only one capable of restoring stability to the state, being chosen by consensus among its different political factions to succeed Alvim. Pena ran for president of Minas Gerais, on a single ticket, and became the first democratically elected president of the state by direct vote on 30 June 1892, with a total of 48 thousand votes. He took office on 14 July, succeeding Eduardo Ernesto da Gama Cerqueira, the last provisional president of Minas Gerais.

The legality of Floriano Peixoto's position as president was questioned by civilians and high-ranking officers of the armed forces, who believed that new elections should be held. (Note: Peixoto had been indirectly elected Deodoro da Fonseca's vice president by Congress after the proclamation of the republic. A special provision of Brazil's 1891 Constitution, referring to those elected by Congress, stated that they would occupy "the presidency and vice presidency of the Republic during the first presidential period". Article 42 of the Constitution, however, referring to presidents elected by universal suffrage, provided that the vice president would occupy the remainder of the presidential term if at least two years had passed since the president's inauguration, otherwise new elections should be held. Fonseca had resigned less than two years since his inauguration, Lacombe 1986, p. 164.) On 6 April 1892, 13 senior army and navy officers published a manifesto calling for new elections. Peixoto's reaction was brutal. The president dismissed the officers, decreed a state of emergency, suspended constitutional guarantees, deported his enemies to remote regions in the country, and carried out mass arrests. Peixoto's radical followers, known as Jacobins, resented Minas Gerais' independence from the federal government's influence and plotted to remove Pena from office. Colonel Carlos Teles, commander of the 31st battalion, intended to overthrow Pena and take over the state government. Aware of the plot and feeling his position threatened, Pena decided to send a letter to Peixoto, asking the president to intervene directly in the matter. On 23 February 1893, Teles was transferred to Bagé, thus ending the threat.

On 2 February 1893, amid the events unfolding in the capital, a civil war broke out in Rio Grande do Sul under the leadership of Gaspar da Silveira Martins and Gumercindo Saraiva, against governor Júlio de Castilhos, the latter brought to power by Peixoto. Known as the Federalist Revolution, the rebels wanted to march north and reach São Paulo. Pena spoke out against the rebels and in favor of the government, with the aim of keeping Minas Gerais out of conflicts. As president of Minas Gerais, he opposed Peixoto's authoritarianism and gave sanctuary to his opponents in the state, notably Olavo Bilac and Carlos de Laet. Laet, a fervent monarchist, praised Afonso Pena for not having allowed "the Rio police to capture in the territory of Minas the Sebastianists [monarchists] hidden there".

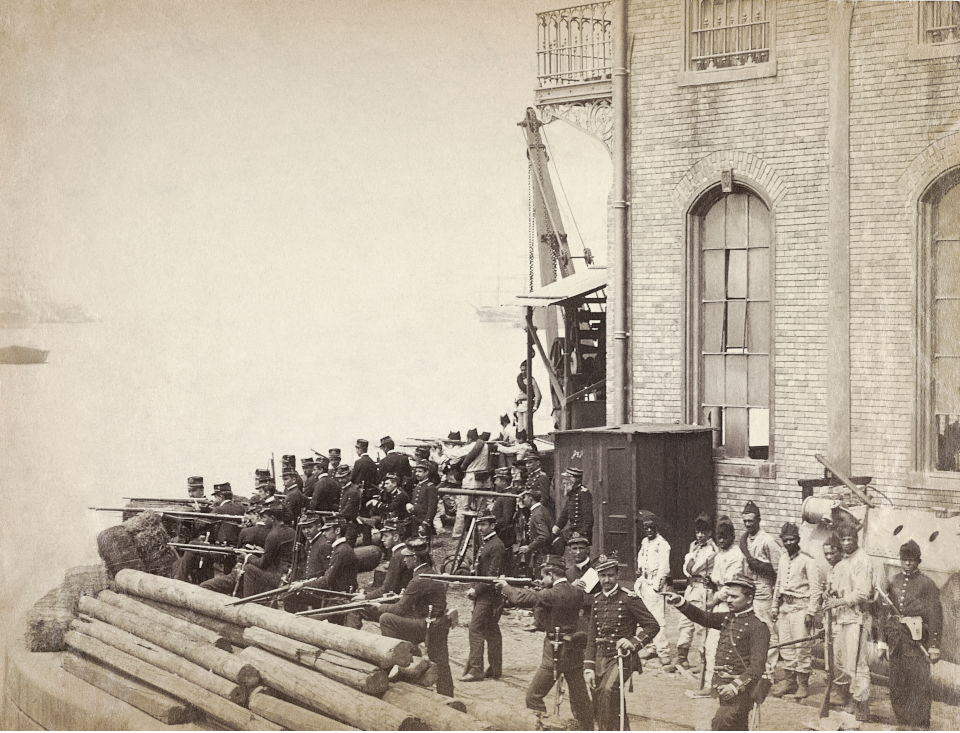
Brazilian Army troops defending Rio de Janeiro's port area during the Naval Revolt, 1893

With the outbreak of the Second Naval Revolt on 6 September 1893, admiral Saldanha da Gama, the leader of the revolt, consulted the citizens as to whether they wanted the return of the monarchy or the maintenance of the republic; in response, Afonso Pena published his Manifesto dos Mineiros in the newspaper O Paiz on 11 December, in which he declared:

Everyone knows that I did not applaud and, on the contrary, lamented the revolution of 1889, which destroyed the monarchy. I immediately understood, however, that the monarchy could no longer be restored under conditions that would provide us with peace, order, and lead the country toward its greatness. Patience is the essential virtue of democracies, and their beauty lies in the fact that nobody can do everything, nor can one always do things. I ask God to enlighten the spirit of those who fight, making them see that the blood of children, women, the elderly, and our brothers does not fertilize the soil of the homeland—on the contrary, it renders it barren.

Thus, despite housing several opponents of the federal government in his state, including monarchists and rebels, who fled persecution by the central government, and disapproving of Floriano Peixoto's actions, Pena urged the people not to join the rebellion, siding with the president against it, as he deemed it necessary to maintain the country's unity. He went so far as to offer the federal government the help of the Public Force of Minas Gerais, if necessary. This did not mean he supported Floriano Peixoto's stay in power, as he wanted a return to civilian rule. Once the naval revolt was defeated, Peixoto's supporters plotted a coup d'état to keep him in power as a dictator. Pena sent a letter to the president, dated 23 January 1894, warning him of the need to ensure that the next elections took place normally. For Américo Lacombe, the letter had the tone of an ultimatum. Accordingly, Pena supported the presidential candidacy of Prudente de Morais for the 1894 election, despite several calls for him to run in the elections. Morais won the election and became the first civilian president of Brazil. As a reward for his loyalty, Pena was given the rank of brigadier general by Peixoto. His actions also helped dispel the threat of a federal intervention in Minas Gerais.

==== Foundation of the Faculty of Law ====
During his tenure as state president, Pena strengthened and reformed public education, created several schools in the state's interior, built railways, modernized the tax system, and promoted the amortization of the public debt. He was also the founder of the Free Faculty of Law of Minas Gerais, in Ouro Preto, on 13 November 1892, being elected the Faculty's first director, (Note: He was successively re-appointed as the Faculty's director until his death in 1909, despite being out of office while holding other executive and legislative positions, Guedes 2016, p. 55.) and was also a teacher at the institution, lecturing on financial sciences and public accounting. According to Luiz Arnaut, Pena "used all the resources at his disposal to make the faculty viable. He ceded public buildings, set up committees in municipalities to raise funds, gave up his rest [time] as president of the State to prepare classes, as well as his pay for services provided to the faculty. The institution formally began to function on 2 January 1893; a federal decree of 21 February 1893 granted it the status of a "free faculty", which equated it to official federal institutions. Three students graduated as early as 1893: Antônio Gomes de Lima, Augusto Cesar Pedreira, and Rodolfo Jacob. Pena would later also be responsible for moving the faculty to Belo Horizonte in 1898.

==== New state capital ====
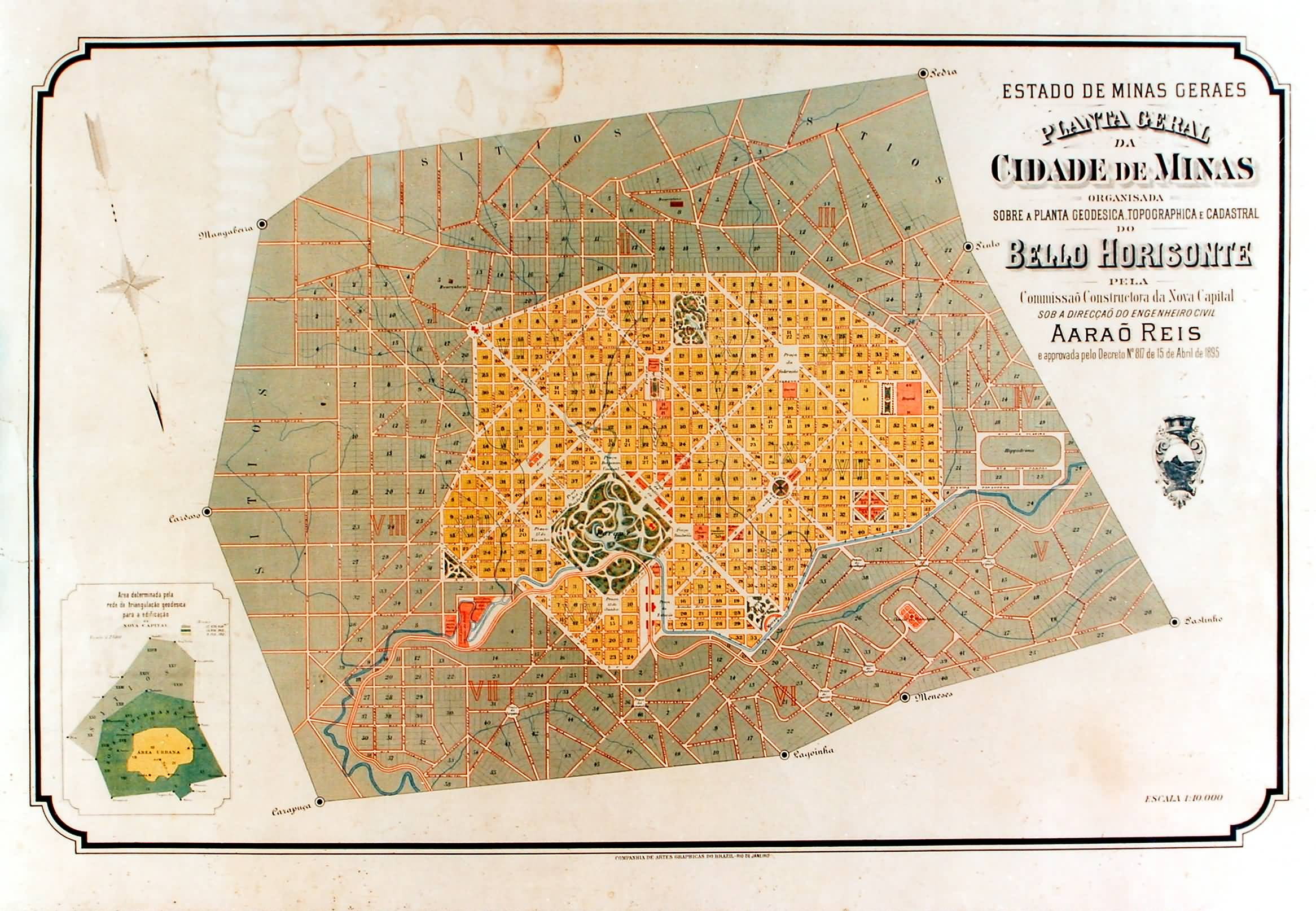
Belo Horizonte's city plan, drawn up by the New Capital Construction Committee, headed by engineer Aarão Reis, 1895

As no consensus was reached regarding where the new capital of Minas Gerais would be, the question was left open in the State Constitution, which only established that the capital of Minas Gerais should be moved to another location, without specifying where that would be. It was then agreed that the Minas Gerais Congress would decide the issue and, at the end of 1891, it indicated Barbacena, Belo Horizonte, Paraúna, Várzea do Marçal, and Juiz de Fora as possible locations. A law was also approved determining the formation of a Technical Committee tasked with presenting its opinion on the suggested locations. The committee's members were appointed by Afonso Pena in December 1892 and its leadership fell to Aarão Reis.

The Technical Committee's opinion was delivered in July 1893 and the issue was once again the subject of intense debate in the state congress. Politicians from different parts of Minas Gerais demanded the capital be moved to their respective regions, but in the end the Technical Committee pointed to Belo Horizonte and Várzea do Marçal as the best places. Afonso Pena preferred Belo Horizonte, but the Congressional Committee tasked with analyzing the two options opined in favor of Várzea do Marçal, which was preferred by deputies from the south of the state. Belo Horizonte's detractors claimed the place was unhealthy, with inadequate topography and little water. They also argued that it had poor soil for agriculture and pointed to the need to compensate the local landowners. Finally, the two places were debated by the full legislature, with Belo Horizonte winning by just two votes, 30 against 28. Fourteen congressmen were absent from the vote.

Thus, on 13 December 1893, the state's legislature met in Barbacena and passed the law providing for the construction of Belo Horizonte within a maximum period of four years in what was then the old colonial village of Curral d'el Rey, replacing Ouro Preto as the state's capital; the law had been proposed by Afonso Pena. Ouro Preto's geographic features were considered an obstacle to the development of Minas Gerais.

==== Economic policy and immigration ====
Afonso Pena in Revista Illustrada's issue No. 670, 1894

Afonso Pena sought to improve the state's economy by addressing some of its most immediate issues; these included the loss of income in coffee exports due to the fact that, by being a landlocked state, Minas Gerais' production had to be exported through the port of Rio de Janeiro, which kept the tax revenues. To tackle this issue, Pena created a dry port in the municipality of Juiz de Fora, where most of the state's coffee production was located, and made an agreement with president Floriano Peixoto by which each coffee-producing state would retain its production's tax revenue, thus greatly reducing Minas Gerais' dependency on Rio de Janeiro. In 1893, reciprocating the visit he had received the previous year, Pena traveled to Vitória, where he met governor Muniz Freire. Together they signed an agreement between Minas Gerais and Espírito Santo for the construction of a railway linking the two states, an unprecedented feat in Brazil at the time. The agreement would give rise, a few years later, to the Vitória-Minas Railway.

At that time, Pena also defended the taxation of imported goods as a way to promote local production. During his executive service in the 1880s, he had begun to shift toward a more protectionist stance, in contrast to his early liberal and laissez-faire ideas. In his own words, his position became that of a "moderate protectionism". He also began to envision the state as a modernizing actor, with the role of promoting economic growth. He later declared that:

In modern times, the issue par excellence that occupies the attention of governments, statesmen, assemblies, and the press is the economy. The theory of the gendarme State, a simple maintainer of order and distributor of justice, has had its time, with few publicists supporting it in its purity, and it is positively refuted by the politics of civilized peoples, with no exception in England. Another is the dominant concept: the high mission of the State also encompasses caring for the people, exercising its beneficial action in areas of social activity, provided that individual initiative, in its various forms, proves to be impotent or insufficient.

Pena also adopted a more active role for the state in promoting immigration to Minas Gerais, in particular German immigration, whose immigrants were perceived as skilled laborers, necessary for the development of the state. This was in line with the ideas, common at the time, of social Darwinism and racial determinism. The government measures aimed at bringing entire families, in order to encourage permanent settlement. During the imperial era, Pena had argued against the proposal of bringing Chinese immigrants, then called "coolies", as he deemed it "the introduction of another deleterious element to the many that are in our country" and that it would contribute to the "decay of the race". Despite his efforts, the number of immigrants who settled in Minas Gerais was smaller than to other Brazilian states, which offered better pay and working conditions. Its system of indentured servitude, the local climate, and cholera epidemics made Minas Gerais less attractive for immigrants.

=== President of the Bank of the Republic (1895–1898) ===
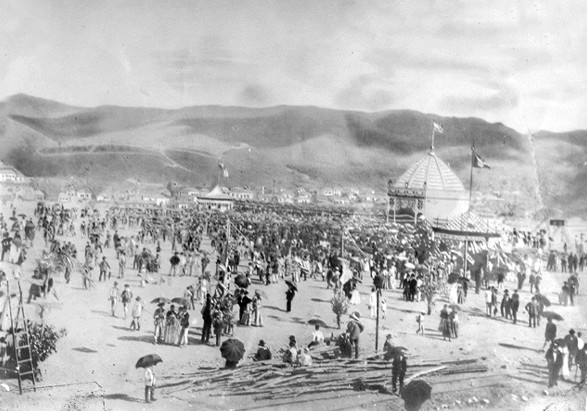
The founding of Belo Horizonte in 1897

Pena left the government of Minas Gerais on 7 September 1894, being succeeded by Bias Fortes. Upon leaving office, he was invited by president Prudente de Morais to occupy a position in the Supreme Federal Court and become Brazil's plenipotentiary minister to Uruguay, in which he could help to pacify Rio Grande do Sul, where the civil war still raged, but he refused, arguing that he did not want to leave Minas Gerais. Pena only accepted the position of president of the Bank of the Republic, the current Bank of Brazil, which he held from 1895 to 1898; it was the main Brazilian banking institution at the time.

Pena's appointment was due to the fact that Rodrigues Alves, then Brazil's Minister of Finance, was his colleague from the Faculty of Law; together they worked to solve the economic crisis caused by the Encilhamento through a set of reforms that sought to contain government spending, restore the country's credit, and revalue the currency's exchange rate. During that time, Pena adopted an even more protectionist stance, suggesting that imports for which domestically produced equivalents existed be taxed, especially textiles and food, which was approved by Congress in 1896. At the head of the bank, he also accompanied and financially assisted the construction of Belo Horizonte. At the end of Prudente de Morais' government, Pena was optimistic about the improvement in the country's financial situation and the easing of political tensions. He left the presidency of the bank on 14 November 1898.

=== Vice presidency (1903–1906) ===
Pena returned to Minas Gerais in 1899 and resumed his position as teacher and director at the Faculty of Law. That same year, he was elected the first president of the Deliberative Council of Belo Horizonte (1899–1904). In 1900, he was elected to the State Senate in order to replace Francisco Sales for the remainder of the 3rd legislature (1899–1902) and then was reelected for the 4th legislature (1903–1906), but resigned in 1903, when he was elected vice president of Brazil on 18 February, following the death of Silviano Brandão, and took office on 23 June. Brandão, elected vice president on 1 March 1902, died on 20 September of that year, less than two months before taking office. At the time, the vice president was also the president of the Senate. With Rodrigues Alves as president and Pena as vice president, the country's leadership was then in the hands of two former members of the monarchy for the first time since the proclamation of the republic.

== Presidential election of 1906 ==
=== Negotiations ===
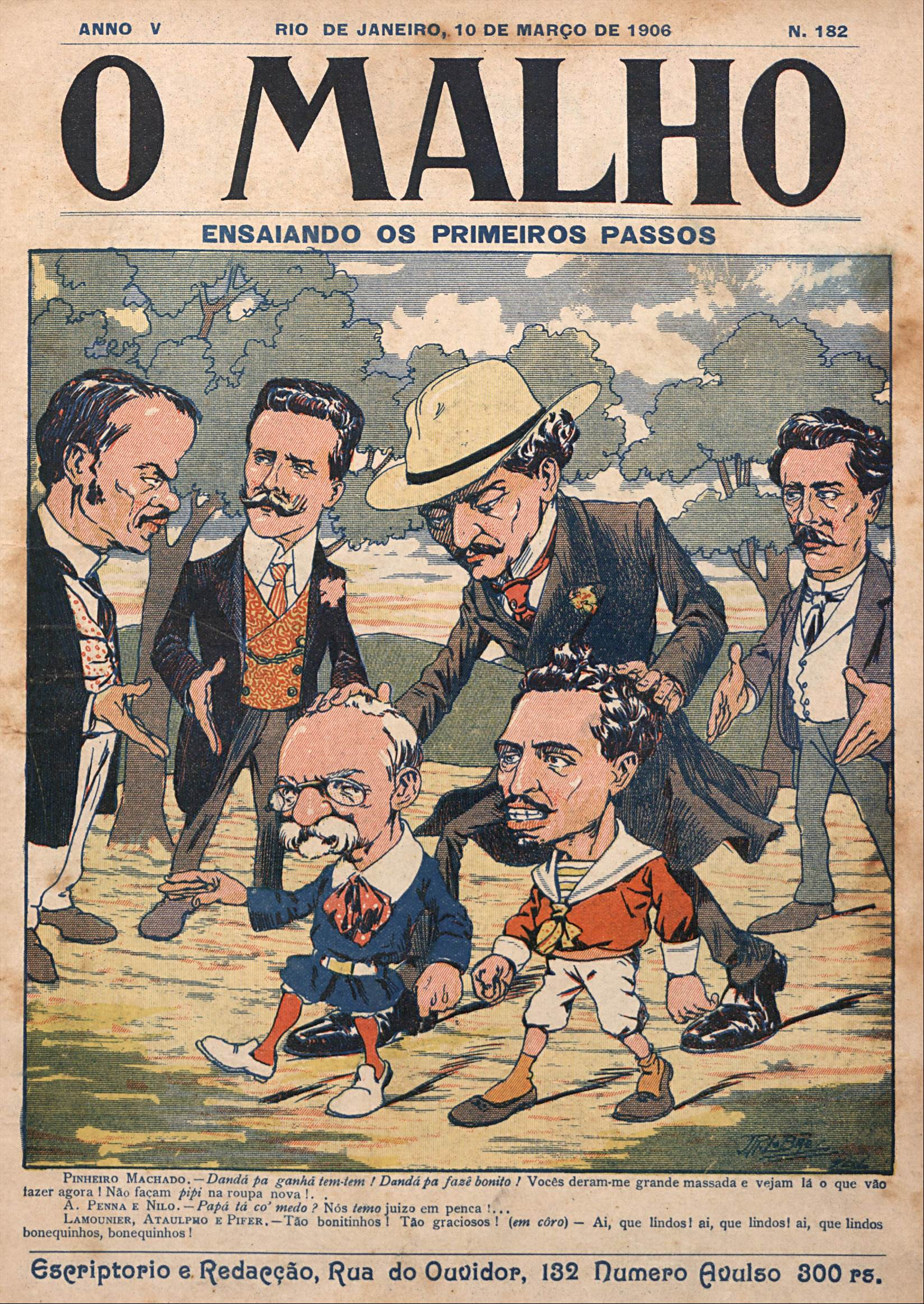
"Rehearsing the first steps", O Malho cover showing the children Pena and Peçanha being guided to the presidency by Pinheiro Machado

The Brazilian presidential election of 1906 was one of the least disputed at the time, but the issue of president Rodrigues Alves' succession had been the subject of intense behind-the-scenes disputes among the states. On one side, São Paulo elites intended to elect a fourth consecutive president from that state, with Rodrigues Alves choosing Bernardino de Campos as his successor. Other states' oligarchies saw this as an obstacle to their own ambitions, as it meant that São Paulo would maintain undue influence in the country. During the First Brazilian Republic, it was common for incumbent presidents to choose their successors, given that reelection was not allowed, and Alves thought that he could get the oligarchies to accept his choice through mere imposition. His decision caused discontent among the dominant oligarchies of several states, which put forward their own potential candidates, including Afonso Pena.

In a letter to Pena, in March 1905, Alves asked him to support Bernardino de Campos, so as to avoid disputes in the upcoming Republican convention that would ratify Campos' candidacy. Pena responded a few weeks later, making clear his disagreement with the perpetuation of São Paulo politicians in power and with the government's intention to control the succession process. Pena's thinking aligned with that of Pinheiro Machado, an influential senator from Rio Grande do Sul, who also sought to influence the presidential succession. Machado supported Campos Sales, from the Republican Party of São Paulo (PRP), as a candidate for the upcoming election. Despite being from São Paulo, Sales, who was president of Brazil from 1898 to 1902, was unpopular with much of São Paulo's elites due to the unpopularity of his presidency, thus dividing the PRP. In Bahia, José Marcelino, the state governor, launched Ruy Barbosa's candidacy, further complicating the succession.

The uncertainty regarding the official candidacy caused apprehension among the elites, as it was necessary to choose an official candidate before the convention. They feared that, if Rodrigues Alves succeeded in imposing his candidate, revolts and revolutions could break out, leading to the end of the young Brazilian Republic, as the republic's turbulent early years, aggravated by an attempted coup d'état during the Vaccine Revolt in 1904, still haunted them.

In Minas Gerais, the PRM was divided with regard to Pena's candidacy. Politicians from the Zona da Mata supported him, while those from the central region supported the official candidate. The governor of Minas Gerais, Francisco Sales, urged Pena to side with Rodrigues Alves against Pinheiro Machado, as he thought they could not defeat the president. Negotiations took a different turn, however, when Campos Sales withdrew his candidacy. With no alternative against the official candidate, and despite his lack of sympathy for a former member of the monarchy, Pinheiro Machado approached Pena, who was also supported by the army – still resentful of Rodrigues Alves for the repression during the Vaccine Revolt – and Campos Sales himself. Several other candidates were considered, but Pena seemed the strongest one.

After the news that Minas Gerais would not support Bernardino de Campos' candidacy, the states of Bahia, Rio Grande do Sul, and Rio de Janeiro saw an opportunity to form an alliance with Minas Gerais, which was able to emerge on the national stage now that its internal political disputes had been settled. Thus, for the first time since the republic was proclaimed in Brazil, some of the large states managed to unite against São Paulo, forming the Bloco (Block) coalition. Led by Pinheiro Machado (Rio Grande do Sul), Nilo Peçanha (Rio de Janeiro), and Ruy Barbosa (Bahia), the coalition backed Afonso Pena and Nilo Peçanha for president and vice president, respectively. Ruy Barbosa withdrew his candidacy in order to support the alliance, and the newspaper Gazeta de Notícias declared: "[i]t seems that Mr. senator Pinheiro Machado's sword has cut, for once, the Gordian knot of the presidential election. Mr. Ruy Barbosa's adherence to the opposition coalition, to the official candidacies, puts, at last, an end to the conjectures that the evolution of political maneuvers creates". Isolated, São Paulo chose to give veiled support to the Bloco.

=== Election and inauguration ===
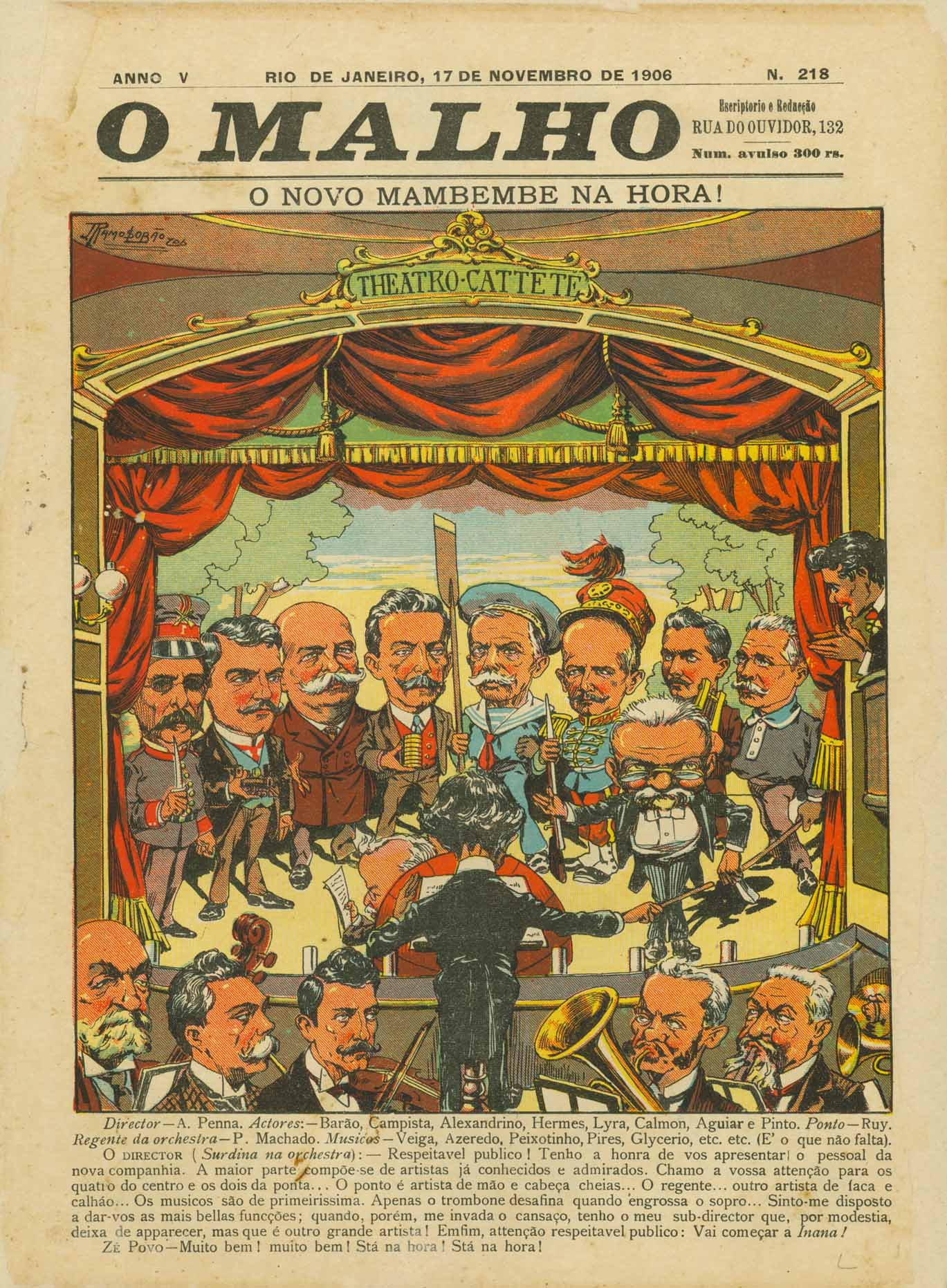
"The new spectacle right now!", Pena "presents" his cabinet to the public after his inauguration

Afonso Pena's candidacy was officially launched on 1 September 1905 with a manifesto written by Ruy Barbosa, which was read in the Senate and widely publicized in the press. Pena presented his government program on 12 October 1905 in the Cassino Fluminense. The election, held on 1 March 1906, took place peacefully and Pena was elected with 97.9% of the votes. In absolute terms, however, he received the lowest number of votes for the presidency until then: 288,285. Pena ran as a single candidate, but electors were allowed to cast votes for anyone, even non-candidates. According to Cláudia Viscardi, once defeated, São Paulo candidates "withdrew and remained in prolonged political ostracism, only interrupted after the succession of Venceslau Brás".

Before taking office, Pena went on a three-month tour around the country, traveling over 21,000 kilometers and visiting eighteen state capitals, an unprecedented feat at the time. The departure took place on 16 May 1906 aboard the liner Maranhão, initially heading to northeastern and northern Brazil, followed by a brief stop in Rio de Janeiro, where Elihu Root, the U.S. Secretary of State, had arrived for the Third Pan-American Conference, (Note: "[T]he first time an American Secretary of State had left the United States in an official capacity", Graham 1972, p. 312.) and then heading south. In Porto Alegre, Pena was received by students under the leadership of the then young student Getúlio Vargas, who gave a speech on their behalf. From Rio Grande do Sul, Pena departed for Rio de Janeiro, where he arrived on 22 August 1906, heading to Belo Horizonte, the final destination, the next day.

Pena became the sixth president of Brazil after being inaugurated on 15 November 1906. His inauguration ceremony took place as usual: the official car, followed by a cavalry picket, with military honors at the Conde dos Arcos and Catete palaces, and the reading of the constitutional oath before the Senate's vice president, Ruy Barbosa. A delegation of people nostalgic for the empire came from São Paulo to watch the inauguration ceremony.

== Presidency (1906–1909) ==
=== Domestic policy ===
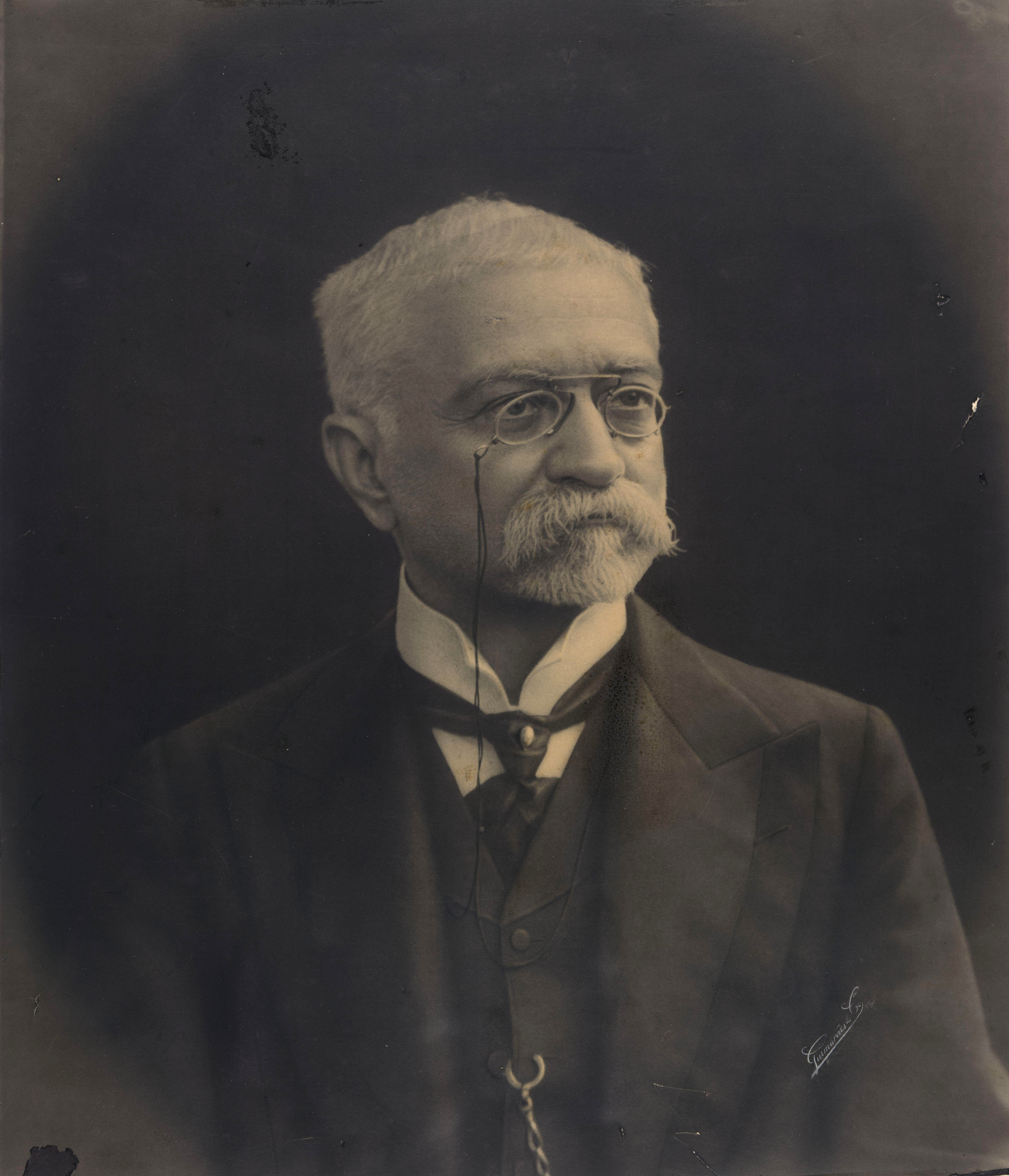
- Presidency of Afonso Pena; 15 November 1906 – 14 June 1909
- Vice President: Nilo Peçanha
- Party: PRM
- Election: 1906
- Seat: Catete Palace
- Standard of the President

According to Américo Lacombe, "succeeding Rodrigues Alves was a terrible challenge for a statesman", as the outgoing president had had a "brilliant" administration, which earned him the epithet of "the great president". The new president, abandoning his old liberal convictions, took an interventionist and protectionist line, determined to stimulate the economy through customs duties, immigration and development of infrastructure.

==== Cabinet and appointments ====
According to Lacombe, most of Pena's cabinet choices resulted from his talks with the various political leaders he met while traveling the country before taking office. As a critic of traditional methods of political appointments, Pena based his ministerial nominations on more technical rather than personalistic criteria. The president handed the ministries to David Campista (Finance), Augusto Tavares de Lira (Interior and Justice), Miguel Calmon Du Pin e Almeida (Industry and Transport), Hermes da Fonseca (War), Alexandrino Faria de Alencar (Navy) and Rio Branco (Foreign Affairs). Apart from Rio Branco and the military ministers, the appointments were made in spite of the consolidated state oligarchies. The president also created the Ministry of Agriculture to diversify the country's agricultural exports by dealing with sectors other than coffee, but the new ministry would only come to function in the following administration.

Pena's appointments also included João Ribeiro de Oliveira e Sousa for the presidency of the Bank of Brazil, Edmundo da Veiga, who was married to one of Pena's daughters, as secretary of the presidency (a position equivalent to the current Chief of Staff of the Presidency), and Pedro Lessa and Canuto Saraiva as Supreme Court justices, ignoring Ruy Barbosa's appeal for the appointment of José Joaquim da Palma, who Pena thought was involved in gambling. As mayor of the Federal District, Pena appointed general Francisco Marcelino de Sousa Aguiar.

==== The "kindergarten" ====
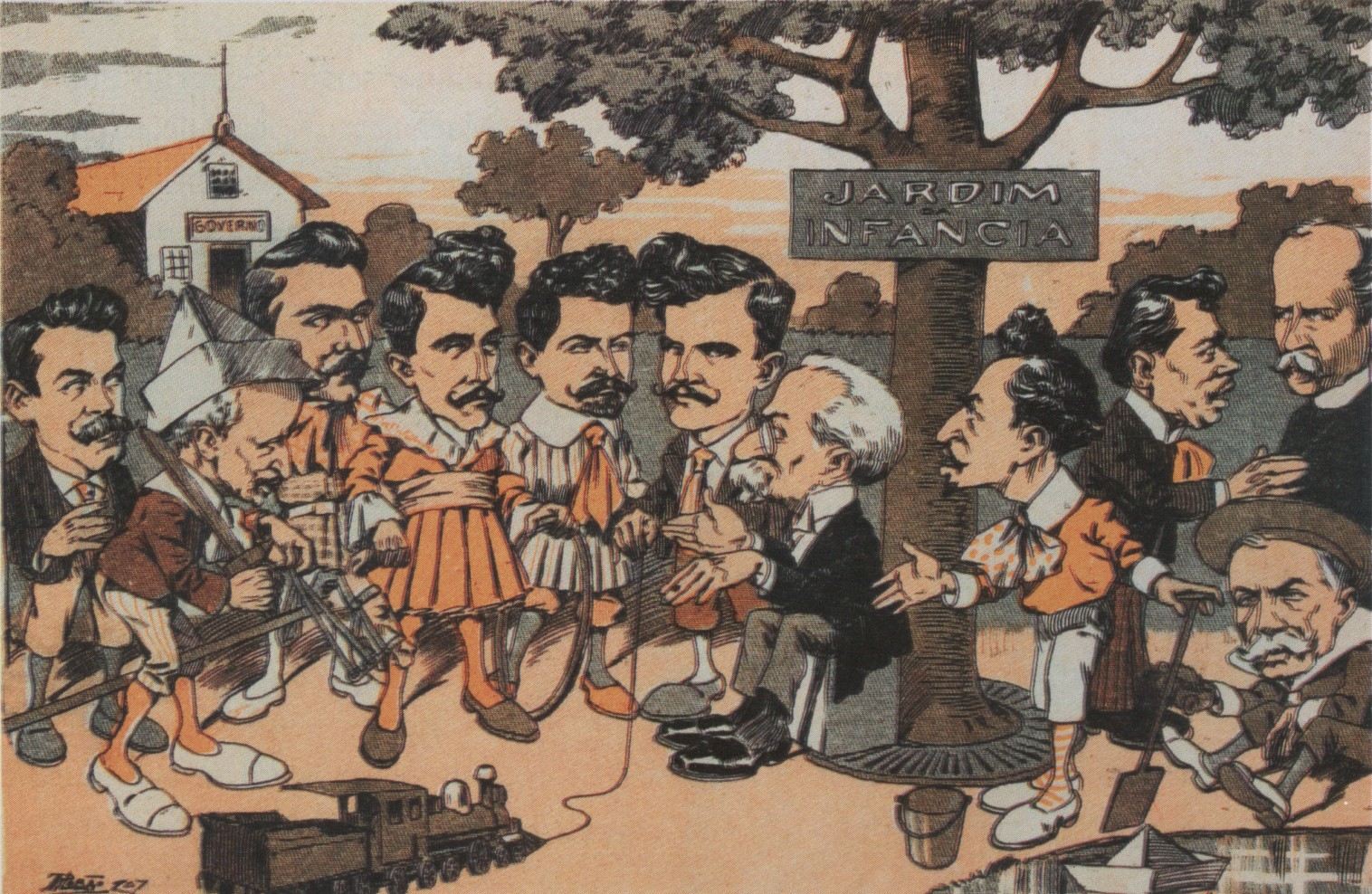
O Malho satire criticizing Pena for his young cabinet ministers. The sign reads: "Jardim da Infância", the kindergarten

Upon taking office, Afonso Pena surrounded himself with a group of young politicians, including his cabinet. These politicians were young and still unknown, as the president wanted to diminish congressional influence in his government and to stabilize the country's currency, one of his main goals. The ministerial nominations displeased state political leaders, some of whom had backed Pena's candidacy, such as Pinheiro Machado and Ruy Barbosa, as they expected the ministerial appointments to be based on hierarchy and prestige. Pena's intention of diminishing congressional influence led to an initially troubled period between the government and the legislature. The president supported Carlos Peixoto Filho, who was then less than 40 years old, as the president of the Chamber of Deputies. The government's leadership in Congress also included other young politicians, such as João Luís Alves and James Darci. Together they were pejoratively nicknamed "the kindergarten".

In this way, the government was supported by two opposing groups: on the one hand the "kindergarten" politicians, supported by a large part of the press, and on the other the traditional politicians of the Bloco, led by Pinheiro Machado. The latter group, which was behind Pena's election, felt excluded from the ministerial nominations. Despite this, Pena sought to appear independent of both. The newspapers of the time attributed a phrase to him: "I'm the one who makes the policy". (Note: According to Cláudia Viscardi, the phrase, supposedly said in a speech by Pena given during João Pinheiro's inauguration as governor of Minas Gerais, may never have been said, Viscardi, p. 11.) According to Cláudia Viscardi, the president "would try hard to keep the two political groups under his control, in a conciliatory effort that had already become the hallmark of his personality".

==== Rondon's expedition ====
Manaus in 1909

In 1906, wanting to consolidate control of Acre, which had been annexed by Brazil following the Acre War, Afonso Pena ordered the expansion of telegraph lines from Mato Grosso to the Madeira River valley, and then to Acre, the Purus and Juruá rivers, and finally Manaus. Believing the solution to other economic, political, and social issues depended on the completion of the work, Pena appointed colonel Cândido Rondon as chief engineer of the Commission for the Construction of Telegraph Lines from Mato Grosso to Amazonas. Rondon, who was already famous for having extended telegraph lines to Brazil's border with Paraguay and Bolivia, personally selected the members of the expedition, choosing from civilians, army officers, and soldiers. The expedition, known as the Rondon Commission, also had the additional goals of carrying out scientific exploration and delimiting the lands of the Casalvasco farm, which extended from the Aguapeí mountain range in Mato Grosso to Brazil's border with Bolivia. The government also created, through Decree No. 6,406 of 8 March 1907, the Works Commission in the Territory of Acre, whose objective was to build roads and public buildings, unblock rivers, and populate the region with the creation of agricultural and professional centers.

The commission started its work in May 1907, later discovering the Juruena River, located in northern Mato Grosso, making its way through the state's northeast and crossing the Amazon jungle until it reached Manaus in 1910. During the journey, Rondon established friendly relations with the indigenous tribes, some of whom acted as guides for the expedition, and became close to the Nambikwara, who were known for cannibalism and resistance to contact with non-indigenous people. From Manaus, Rondon headed to Rio de Janeiro, where he arrived in February 1910—after four years in the jungle, during which time he was even reported missing—and was greeted with public acclaim.

==== The Taubaté Agreement ====
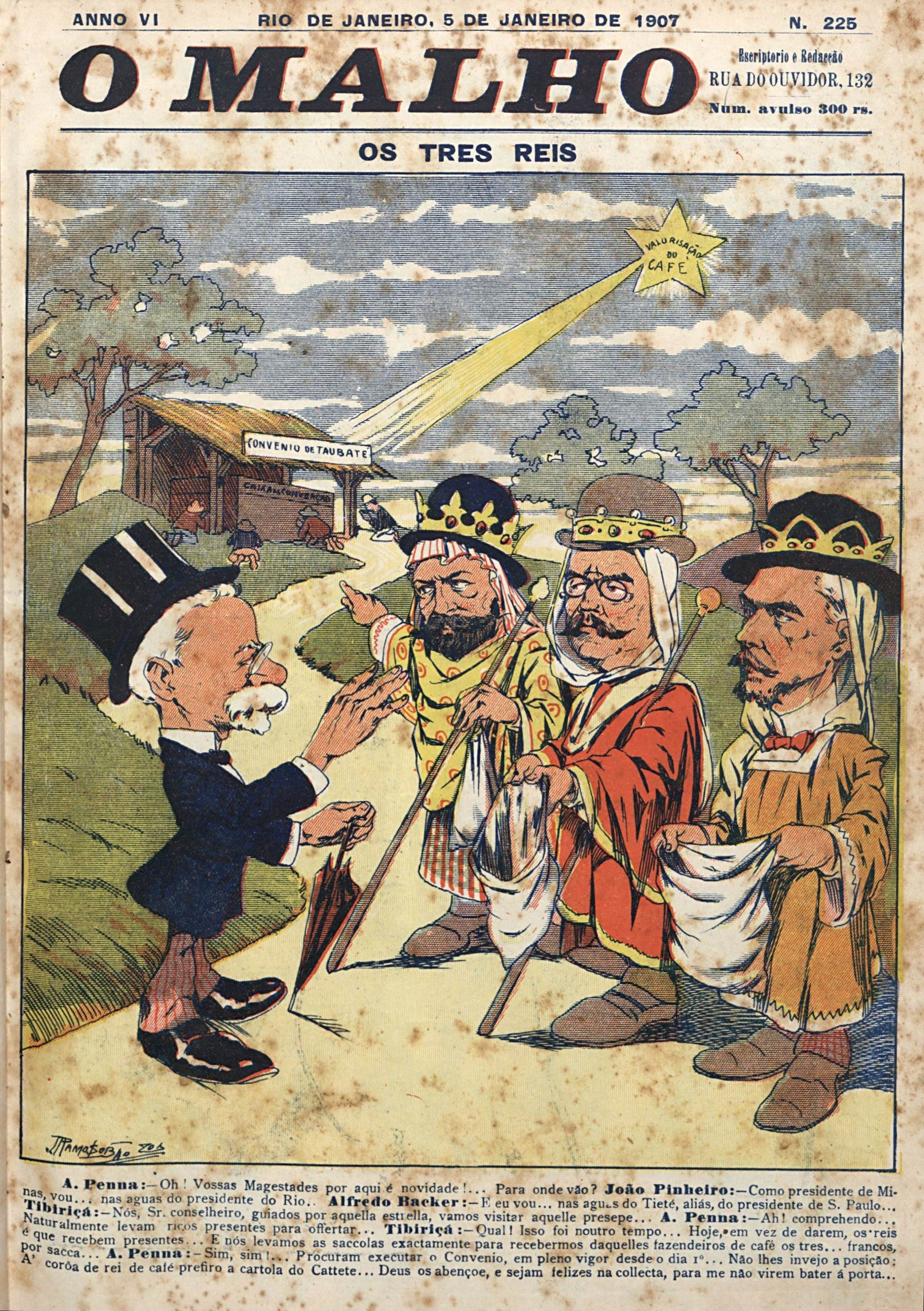
"The three Magi", O Malho cover depicting Afonso Pena and the governors of São Paulo (Jorge Tibiriçá), Rio de Janeiro (Alfredo Backer), and Minas Gerais (João Pinheiro), satirizing the Taubaté Agreement, 5 January 1907

In the second half of 1905, still during the government of president Rodrigues Alves, producers of Brazilian coffee, a product whose importance in Brazil's economy had grown considerably since the mid-19th century, expected a record harvest of 16 million bags. Coupled with the global stock of coffee, which numbered about 10 million bags, and production from other countries, the total supply of the product for the period was expected to reach 30 million bags, while global demand did not exceed 16 million. The harvest estimate proved to be much lower than the actual harvest, which totaled 20 million bags in the 1906–1907 period, the largest crop ever harvested in the country at the time. As a result, international coffee prices were expected to fall considerably. The situation was made worse by the fact that Brazil's exchange rate was at an all-time high, diminishing profits in the local currency. (Note: International coffee prices had been falling since the Panic of 1893. In the first years, the effects of the supply imbalance caused by overproduction were alleviated by the devaluation of the Brazilian currency. However, exchange rate devaluation could no longer be used in defense of coffee, as it negatively affected urban consumers and was prevented by the austerity policies of presidents Campos Sales and Rodrigues Alves, Rossini, p. 2.)

In this context, producers began to call for urgent government intervention: led by São Paulo, the largest coffee producing state in the country and also the most dependent on coffee revenues, the other coffee producing states, Minas Gerais and Rio de Janeiro, were called upon to discuss and sign an agreement in order to protect coffee prices. A coffee valorization proposal had already been made by Alessandro Siciliano, an industrialist and importer from São Paulo, in 1903, but it was refused by president Rodrigues Alves, who remained faithful to his policy of containing public spending, which had begun in 1898 during Joaquim Murtinho's tenure in the Ministry of Finance. On 26 February 1906, the governors of the three coffee producing states met in the city of Taubaté and signed the homonymous agreement, inspired by Siciliano's earlier proposal.

The agreement provided for a series of measures to increase the price of coffee, including the purchase of surplus production by the federal government, which would be done by taking out a foreign loan of 15 million pounds. This large inflow of capital threatened to increase Brazil's exchange rate and, as a result, diminish profits from the sale of coffee. For this reason, the agreement also provided for the creation of the Caixa de Conversão (Conversion Bank) in order to keep the exchange rate stable. Furthermore, for the loan to be viable, the federal government would need to act as a guarantor, as the guarantees required by international lenders went beyond the individual states' budgetary resources.

The coffee defense proposal was met with opposition from several sectors, including president Rodrigues Alves, who was against state intervention in the exchange rate with the creation of the Caixa de Conversão (Conversion Bank). (Note: Rodrigues Alves declared: "It is a mistake to think that the country's agriculture cannot prosper without a low exchange rate. Statistics show, on the contrary, that with better rates than the current ones, the price of coffee has gone up and down, but the crop has lived and prospered", Mendonça 1999, p. 36.) In order to be implemented, it had to be approved by Congress. Fearing that the president would veto the agreement, the signatory states made changes to the text and submitted a separate bill to create the Caixa de Conversão.

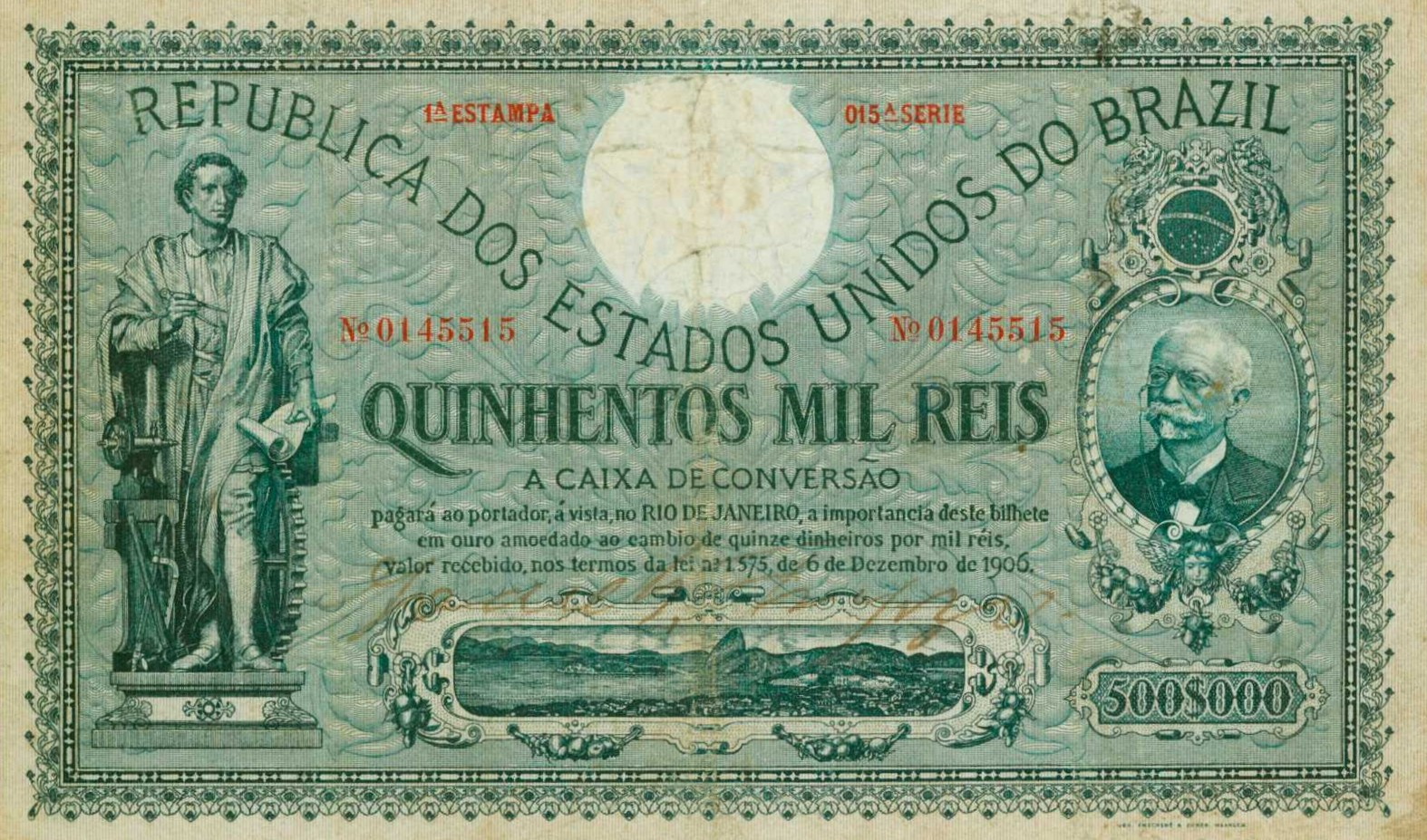
A 500 thousand réis bill issued by the Caixa de Conversão with Pena's effigy

Discussions in Congress began on 19 July 1906 and the agreement was approved with a large majority on 6 August 1906, becoming Decree No. 1,489. Contrary to his predecessor, Afonso Pena – then president-elect – was in favor of the Caixa de Conversão, as he deemed it "essential to the balance of public finances". The bill for its creation was then approved in Congress on 6 December 1906 and signed by Pena, already in office. The Caixa de Conversão would receive deposits of legal tender gold coins and in return issue bills of equal value to the depositors; the exchange rate would also be fixed at 15 pence to milréis. Thus, Brazil adopted a partial gold standard.

Afonso Pena conditioned the federal guarantee for the loan on meeting the demands of coffee growers from Minas Gerais and Rio de Janeiro, who produced inferior quality coffee, and also on São Paulo's support for David Campista as his successor for the 1910 elections. The federal guarantee would only come into effect in November 1908, after all conditions had been met, despite continuous pressure from São Paulo since 1906.

==== National Exhibition of 1908 ====
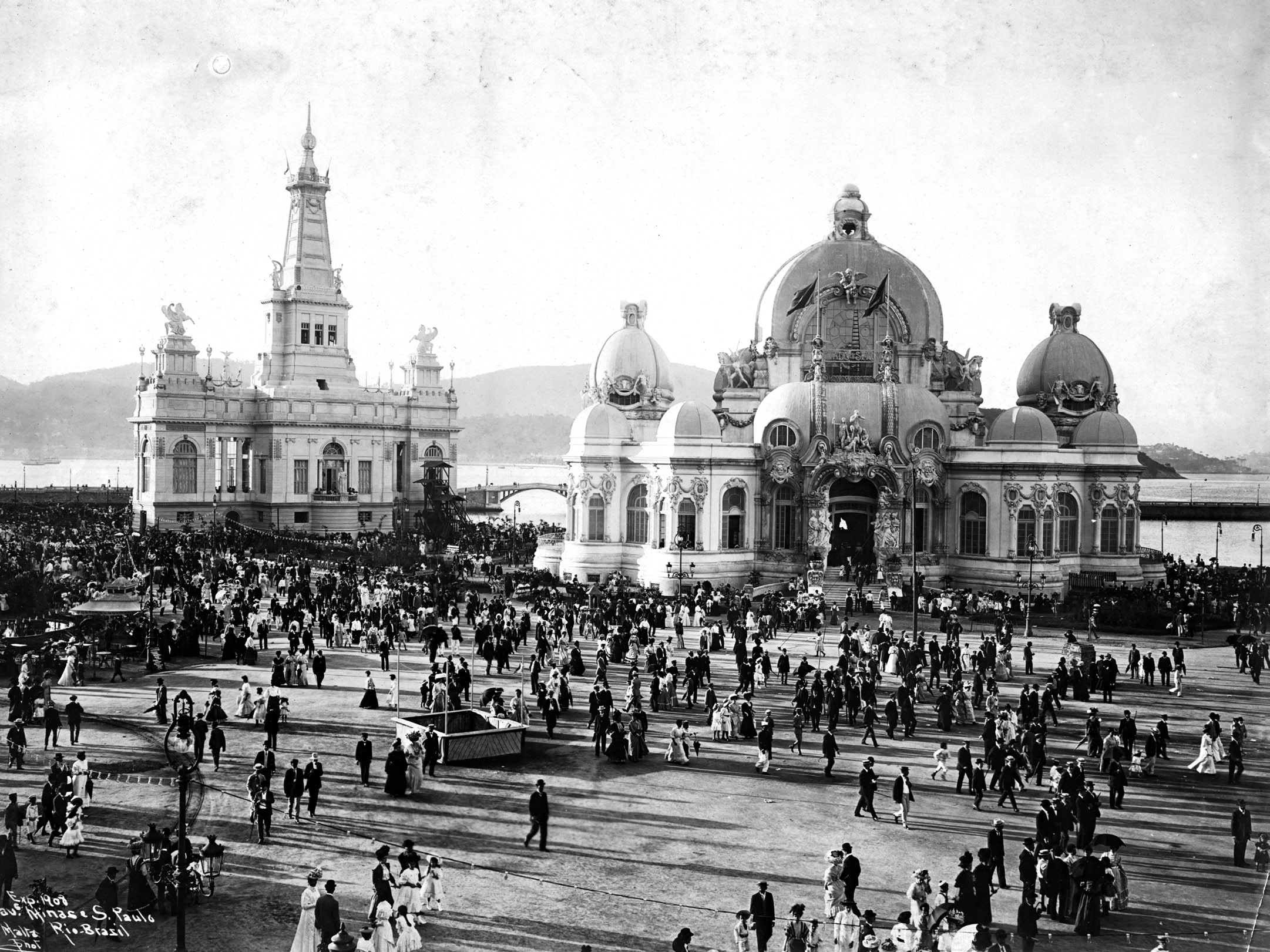
The Minas Gerais and São Paulo pavilions, photograph by Augusto Malta, 1908

The idea of holding a National Exhibition in Rio de Janeiro arose in 1905, and was accepted by the Brazilian Congress, which approved the budget for it in July 1907. The centennial of the opening of Brazilian ports to foreign trade, which took place on 28 January 1808, provided the occasion for the exhibition. The idea was to celebrate the country's own trade and development and "show Brazil for Brazilians themselves", through the exhibition of its agricultural, industrial, and artistic products. Promoted by the federal government, the exhibition also represented the final event in the series of urban and sanitary reforms undertaken in the city of Rio de Janeiro during the administration of mayor Pereira Passos and physician Oswaldo Cruz since 1903.

Preparations for the exposition began under the Pena administration, when Miguel Calmon, then minister of industry, transport and public works, formed a 41-member commission headed by engineer Antônio Olinto in October 1907. Together with mayor Marcelino de Sousa Aguiar, they chose Rio's Urca neighborhood to host the event. King Carlos I of Portugal committed to attending the exhibition, but was assassinated on 1 February 1908, which did not impede the preparations, however.

Construction work lasted from January to June 1908, with the exhibition opening to the public on 11 August 1908, and remaining open until 15 November of the same year. The exposition featured pavilions and stands from Brazilian states, designed by Rafael Rebecchi, René Barba, and Francisco Oliveira Passos, as well as from Portugal, the only foreign country invited, in addition to other individual buildings, such as the Industries Palace. The Liberal Arts Palace featured the work of several Brazilian artists such as Eliseu Visconti, João Batista da Costa, Rodolfo Amoedo, Belmiro de Almeida, Nicolina Vaz de Assis, and Ernesto Giradet. The exposition received more than a million visitors over its three-month duration, who came from all over the country.

==== Army and navy reforms ====
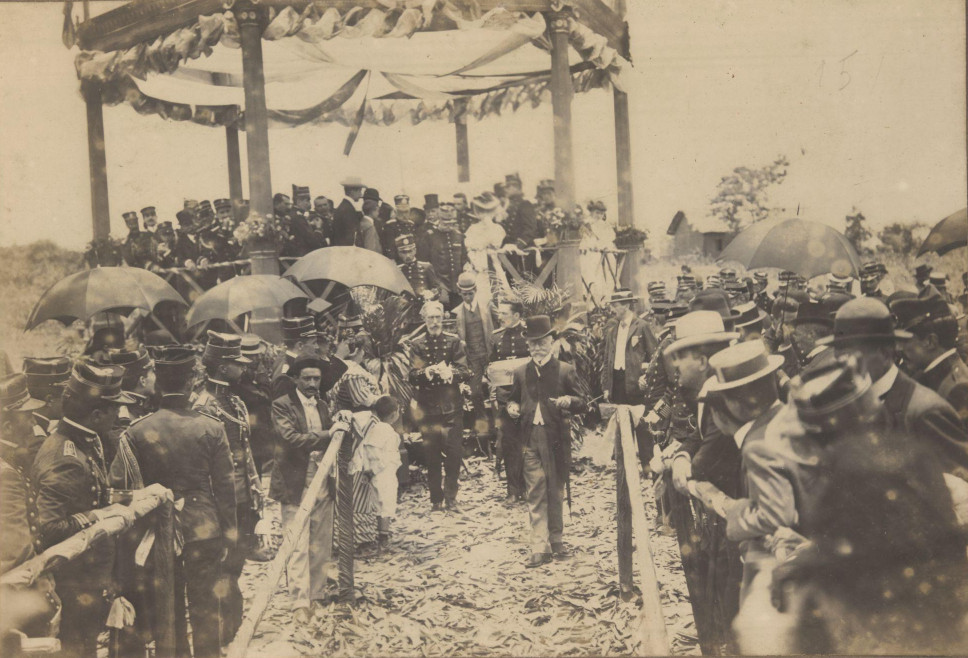
Pena (in the center with a topper) watching military maneuvers

In line with his concerns about industrialization and military strengthening, Afonso Pena appointed Hermes da Fonseca as minister of war; upon taking office, Fonseca warned the president that conditions in the Brazilian Army were "woeful". A congressman stated that the country's Armed Forces were "sadly unequipped to defend the nation against any enemy, even a 3rd or 4th class power". Brazil's minister of foreign affairs stated that conditions in the Armed Forces were "the most regrettable possible". Fonseca had conducted major military maneuvers in 1905 as commander of the 4th Military District, which exposed the precarious state of the troops, as they lacked basic equipment and discipline.

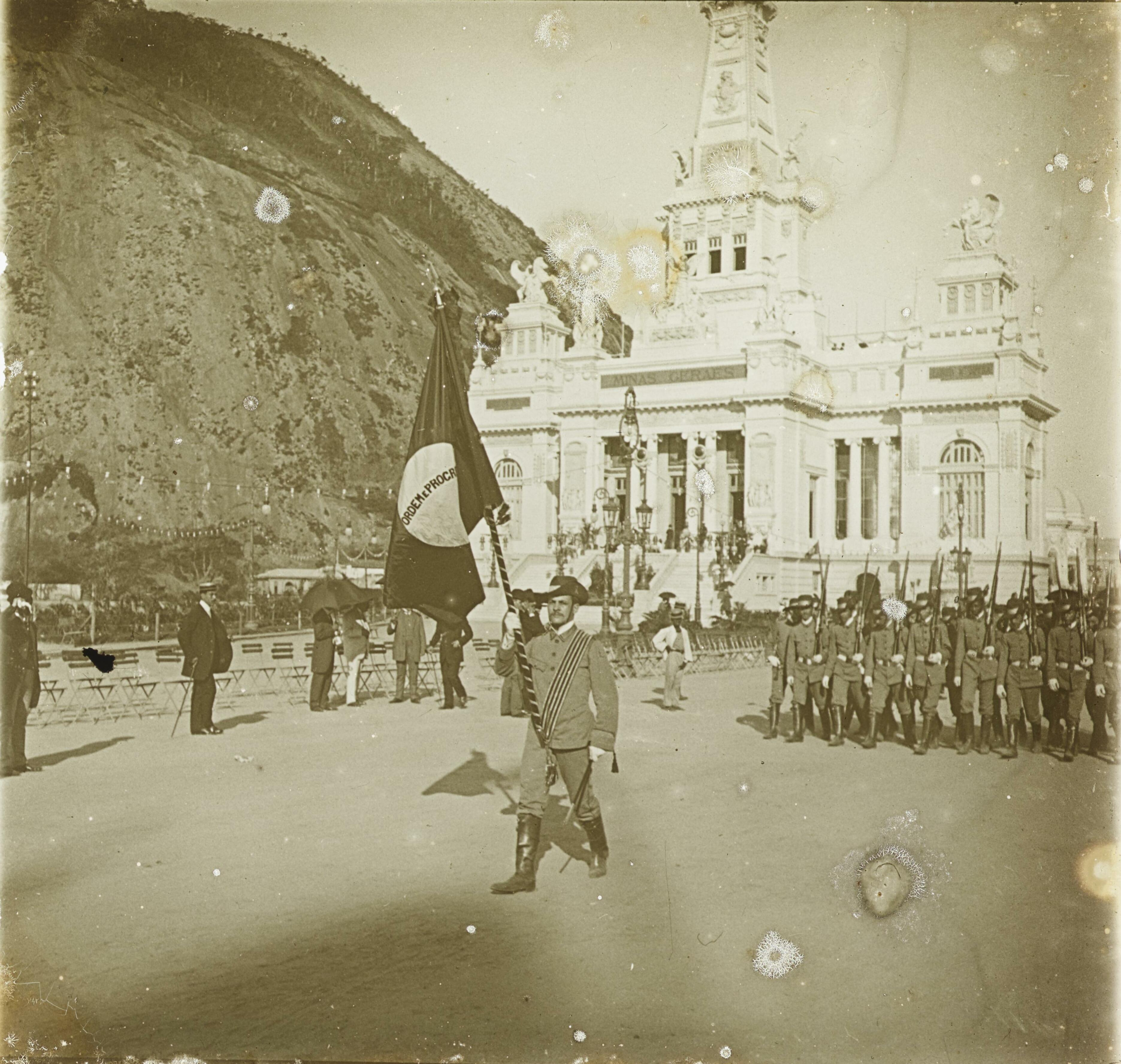
Brazilian troops parading in the 1908 Exposition

In order to tackle this issue, the government began reorganizing the army and the National Guard, and instituted compulsory military service through a draft lottery with the introduction of the Sortition Law (Law No. 1,860 of 4 November 1908). The previous law on the matter had retained forced recruitment, which proved to be insufficient. The new one, inspired by what was already practiced in the "most civilized countries", created a military reserve in order to comply with the Brazilian Constitution of 1891, which stated that all men were subject to compulsory military service. Other countries in South America had already adopted a lottery. The previous year, the Tiros de Guerra (Shooting Ranges) had been created in order to provide "second rate reservists" for the army. Some sectors in society worried that the country would become militarized and there would be a lack of manpower to work in agriculture and industry. Commenting on the matter, Pena declared:

The small number [of soldiers] established in the law of forces, the same for many years, clearly shows that we do not have the desire to constitute ourselves into a military power, and that we are only fulfilling the elementary duty of prudence, providing the security and defense of the nation against possible threats.

Large permanent units were created (the strategic brigades), new equipment was acquired, and the country was divided into inspection zones. Groups of Brazilian officers were sent to Germany in 1908 for military training. Fonseca himself went to Germany that same year, at the invitation of emperor Wilhelm II, to watch military maneuvers. There he hired a German Military Mission to supervise the reorganization of the Brazilian Army, though it ended up not materializing. Fonseca's visit to Germany did bear fruit in the arms sector, with the Krupp company becoming the main supplier of artillery to Brazil.

Despite the government's modernizing efforts, the reforms produced limited immediate results. Resistance within the army itself prevented the adoption of some measures, and the reforms' high costs were met with resistance from the political class. The reform of the army's General Staff took ten years to complete. Likewise, despite being adopted in 1908, the Sortition Law's conscription measures only came into effect in 1916. The law's most consequential effect, however, was to change the army's relationship with society, introducing the idea of the "nation in arms" and expanding the army's influence in politics.

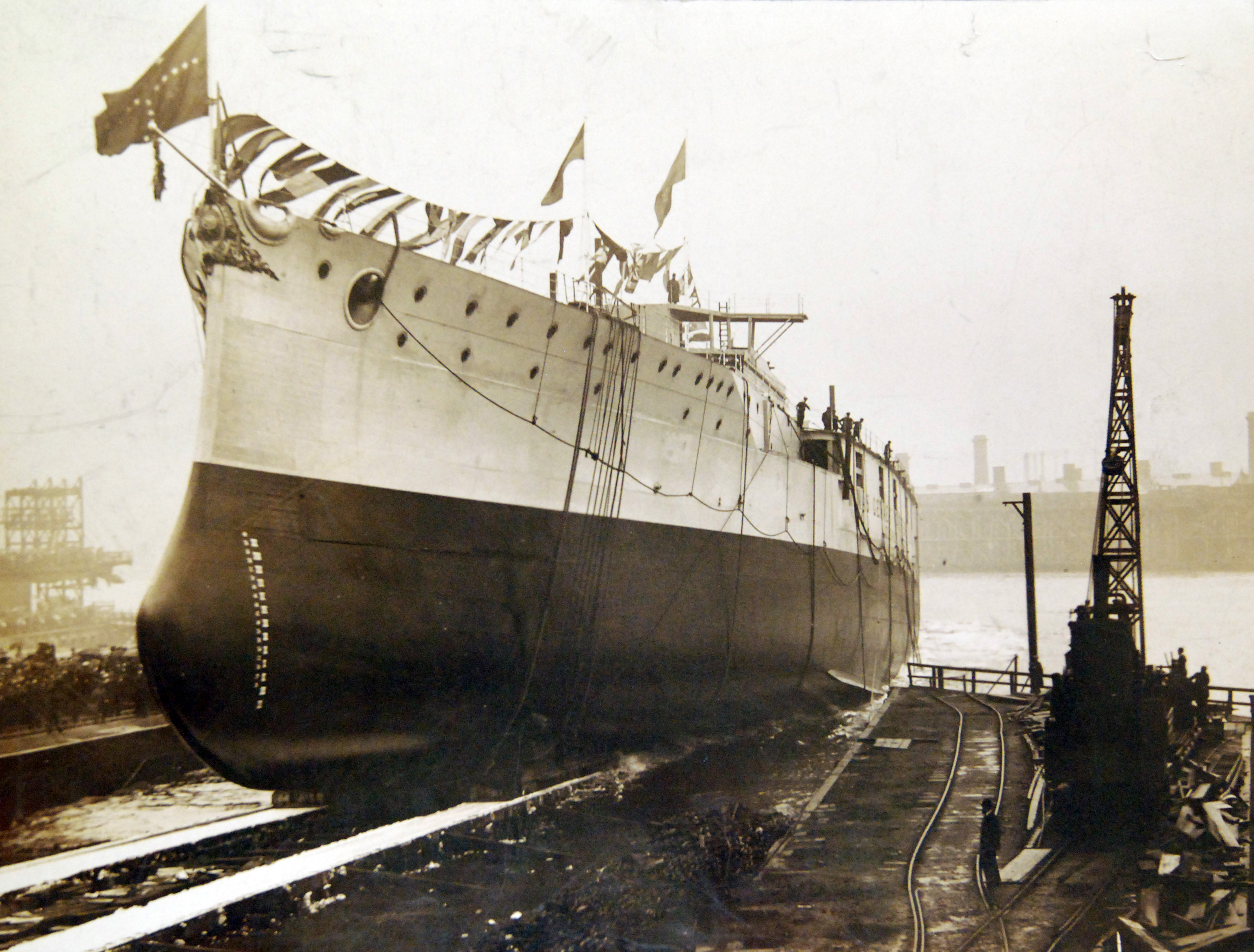
The launch of Minas Geraes, the first of the Minas Geraes-class battleships, on 10 September 1908

In the navy, concrete actions aimed at modernizing the fleet began to be implemented during the previous administration, when admiral Júlio César de Noronha took over the Ministry of the Navy in 1902. According to Alessandro Candeas, Brazil had held the undisputed naval dominance in South America until the early 1890s, when a large part of its navy was destroyed during the 1893 Naval Revolt, and Argentina began to build up its fleet. The economic and political crisis of the country's early republican years had left the navy in disrepair and the ministerial reports from 1891 to 1902 drew attention to its numerous issues and possible ways to solve them. As in the army, the official consensus was that the navy was obsolete and inferior to the navies of Argentina and Chile, which had engaged in an arms race of their own in the 1890s.

As minister of the navy, Noronha devised a broad modernization program. It was approved in December 1904 and provided for the construction of several warships, including three ironclads, six destroyers and three submarines. In addition to modernizing the fleet, the program also aimed at restoring Brazilian naval hegemony in the South Atlantic and providing the means for joint continental defense in case of an invasion by European powers or the United States. With Afonso Pena's election in 1906, however, the program was drastically changed, mainly due to the launch of HMS Dreadnought and criticism of the program itself. Pena appointed Alexandrino Faria de Alencar to replace Noronha, who modified the program in 1907, with the three projected 13,000-ton ironclads being changed to the new "Dreadnought" type battleships, which were significantly heavier. The initial order was limited to the battleships Minas Geraes and São Paulo from British shipyards. (Note: According to Salomão Pontes Alves, Minas Gerais was considered, for a time, the most powerful battleship in the world. The acquisition of the ship raised suspicions among major powers that Brazil was acting as a proxy to sell it to a third party, who could acquire the vessel without raising hostilities, Alves 2017, p. 20.) The third battleship, Rio de Janeiro, far heavier and more powerful than its two predecessors, was launched in 1913, but sold to the Ottoman Empire due to financial difficulties.

==== Immigration and anarchism ====
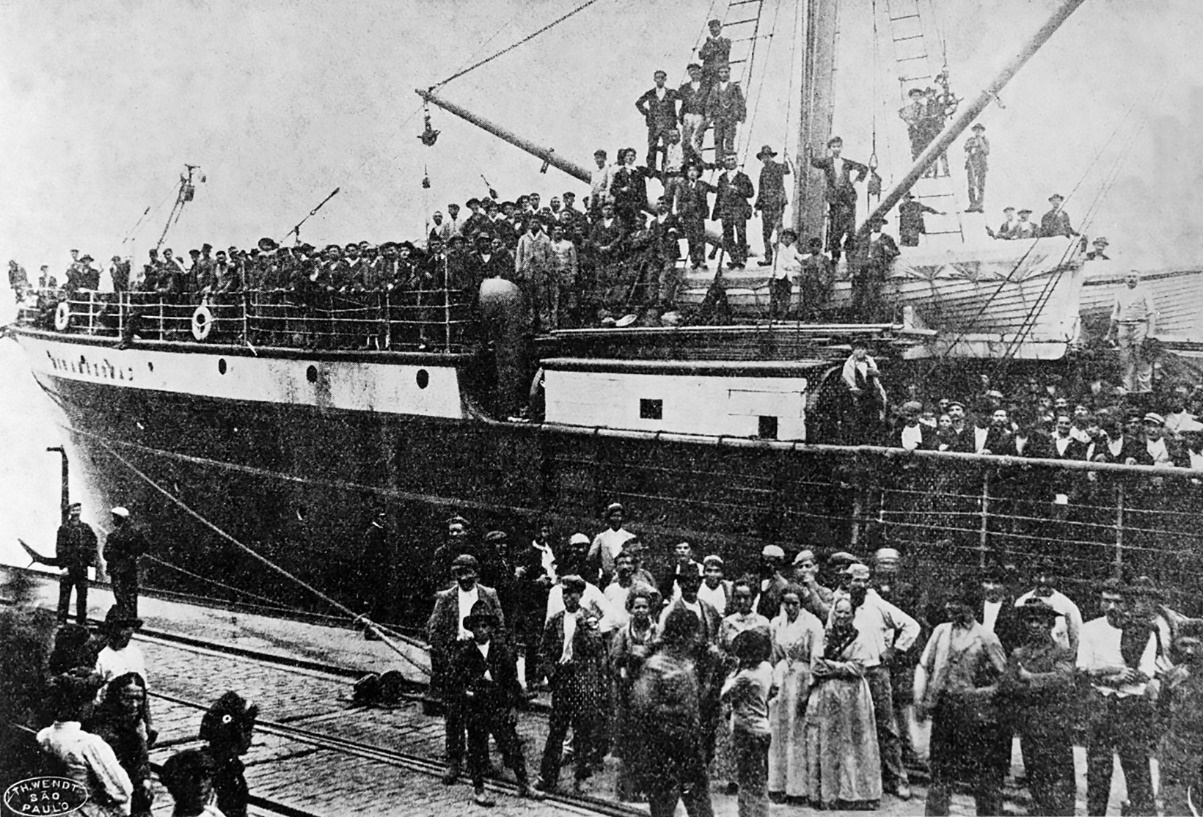
Italian immigrants disembarking in the Port of Santos in 1907

As one of his concerns since he was president of Minas Gerais, Pena instituted a more effective immigration policy. The president opted for the creation of colonial centers for the production of wine and wheat in southern Brazil. The General Directorate of the Settlement Service and the Directorate of the Propaganda and Economic Expansion Service of Brazil Abroad were created, tasked with promoting immigration, monitoring colonization, and promoting the country in Europe, thus transferring the matter of immigration back to the federal government, which had been delegated to the states since 1892. The federal government also started to subsidize travel.

During Pena's administration, the first wave of Japanese immigrants arrived in the country on the ship Kasato Maru, with 781 immigrants disembarking at the Port of Santos in June 1908. The entry of non-European immigrants into the country was limited. However, in the case of immigrants from China and Japan, the restrictions had been relaxed in 1892. All of these federal government measures contributed to increased immigration compared with the period in which the matter had been the responsibility of the states. In total, Brazil received 232,545 immigrants from 1907 to 1909. The country had received almost 900,000 immigrants from 1894 to 1903. From 1904 to 1913 this number would rise to a million.

The large number of immigrants arriving in the country were willing to fight for labor rights. The absorption of all these workers by Brazilian industry was slow and many of them faced neglect and poverty. On 5 January 1907 Pena signed Decree No. 1,637 that granted workers the right to create unions and cooperatives. The following year, the Brazilian Workers' Confederation was created, the first nationwide labor organization in the country. The 1908–1909 period was marked by the outbreak of several strikes across the country. No republican government in Brazil had faced labor issues on this scale until then.

The arrival of immigrants also generated concern among the authorities, who saw in them the "peril of being spoiled by all vices" or being contrary to the "conservative elements of society". Migration control was the responsibility of the police, who could block the entry of criminals and beggars. Soon the police authorities began to demand measures to expel immigrants who were considered "undesirable". Among them were petty criminals and propagators of anarchist ideals among urban workers. Contention between immigrant workers and employers led Congress to debate the expulsion of foreigners in 1906, after the outbreak of strikes and the holding of the First Brazilian Workers' Congress, which proposed direct action. Thus, Decree No. 1,641 of 7 January 1907 was approved, signed by the president. It became known by the name of its proponent, the São Paulo congressman Adolfo Gordo; it allowed for the "cleansing" of undesirable immigrants from the country. Despite the law, the labor movement continued to promote strikes, and workers' newspapers denounced intimidation by the police.

==== Infrastructure ====
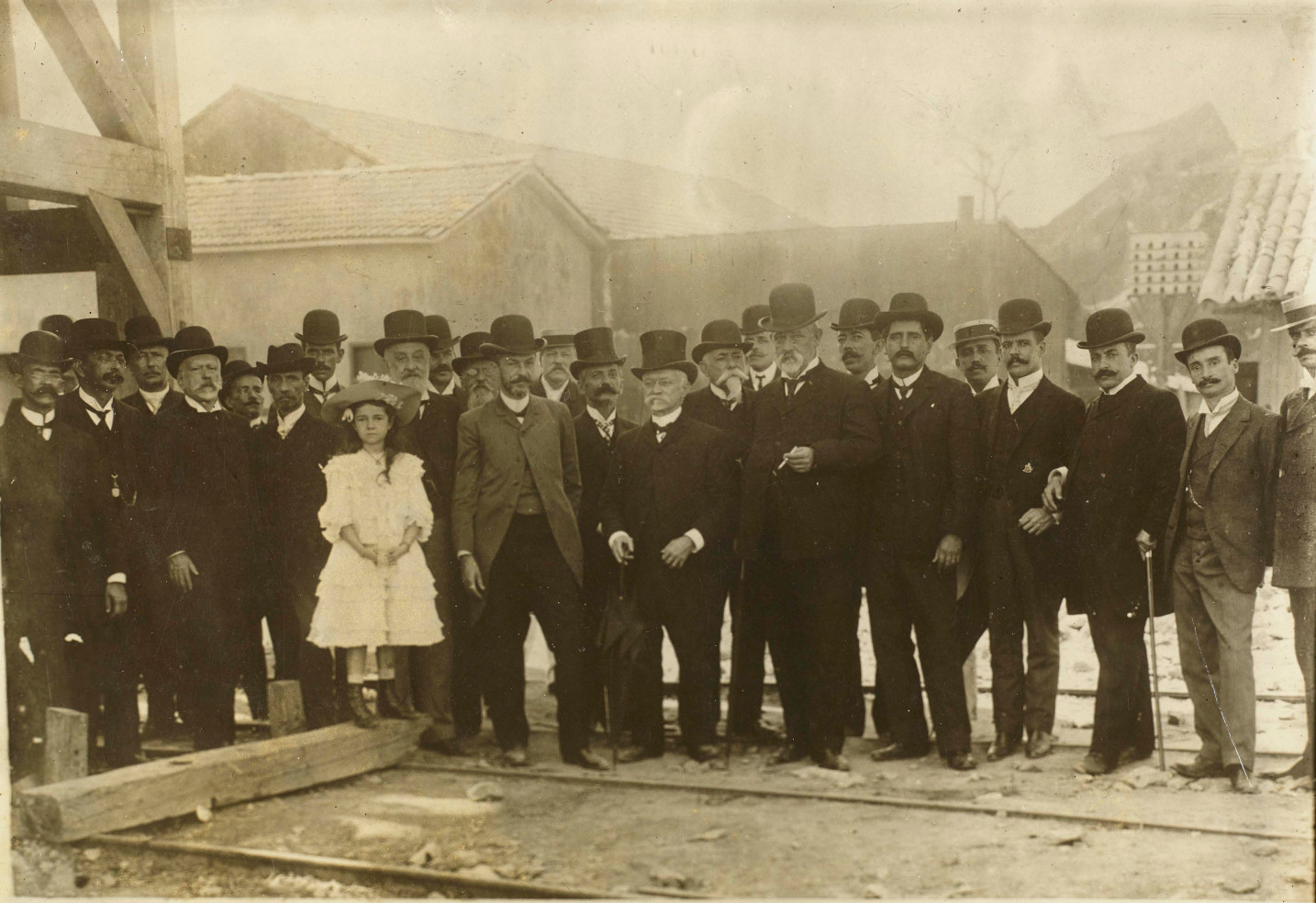
Pena inspecting the works in the port of Rio de Janeiro

Afonso Pena's government was marked by heavy investments in infrastructure. During his term, Brazil experienced a surge in railway construction, with several branches being opened in the states. The Central do Brasil Railway planned to extend the line to the São Francisco River, an old ambition since the Brazilian Empire, and in his message to Congress in 1909, Pena announced the completion of the Madeira-Mamoré Railway. Construction of the Northwestern Brazil Railway was finished and the rail connection between São Paulo and Paraná linked, for the first time, Southeastern and Southern Brazil by train. Brazil's railway network reached its peak at the time, growing from 17,340.4 km in 1906 to 21,466.6 km in 1910. The Pena administration also built a new hydroelectric plant and made efforts to improve sanitation, reorganizing the Manguinhos Institute, which became the Oswaldo Cruz Institute.

The Rondon Commission resulted in the construction of 25 stations and the laying of 2,268 km of telegraph lines. By 1909 the country's telegraph network reached 69,457 km. The president also improved the ports of Recife, Belém, Vitória, and Rio Grande, providing them with facilities similar to those of the port of Santos, and continued the improvements in the port of Rio de Janeiro, begun under the previous administration. Since the beginning of 1908, the company Lloyd Brasileiro had been docking its ships at the pier on an experimental basis. At the end of the year, the pier was already more than 1,900 meters long and 5 warehouses were finished. The port was officially opened on 20 July 1910.

==== Economy ====
Pena took office amid a cycle of economic expansion that had begun under Rodrigues Alves. After almost a decade of stagnation, Brazil's aggregate output began growing at an average rate of over 4% a year between 1900 and 1913, while capital formation in industry increased at an even faster pace. In 1907, Brazilian exports exceeded imports by 5 million pounds, although the majority of exports continued to be primary goods, especially coffee. In 1908, the budget surplus reached 10,441:338$012 réis. The following year, revenue rose to 848:665$600 in gold and 813:210$373 in fiat currency, although the budget moved into deficit from that point onward, as the government incurred heavy expenditures to finance its projects. The exchange rate in milréis to pence was 16 11/64 in 1906 and remained relatively stable in the following years, closing at 15 9/64 in 1909. The Caixa de Conversão achieved its goal of stabilizing the exchange rate from 1906 to 1914, when it ceased to operate, but failed to stabilize economic activity. According to Pedro Calmon, it regularized the servicing of interest and Brazil's foreign debt, also fostering public credit.

Worsening inflation and growing opposition to protectionist measures forced the government to abandon plans for new tariffs. In 1907, Pena opposed a bill proposed by the Minas Gerais congressman João Luís Alves to raise tariffs on agricultural goods and raw materials that had a local equivalent, arguing that the gold tax had already been raised by 50% on foodstuffs, raw materials and semi industrialized goods, and 35% on the remaining items in 1905. Thus the bill was abandoned.

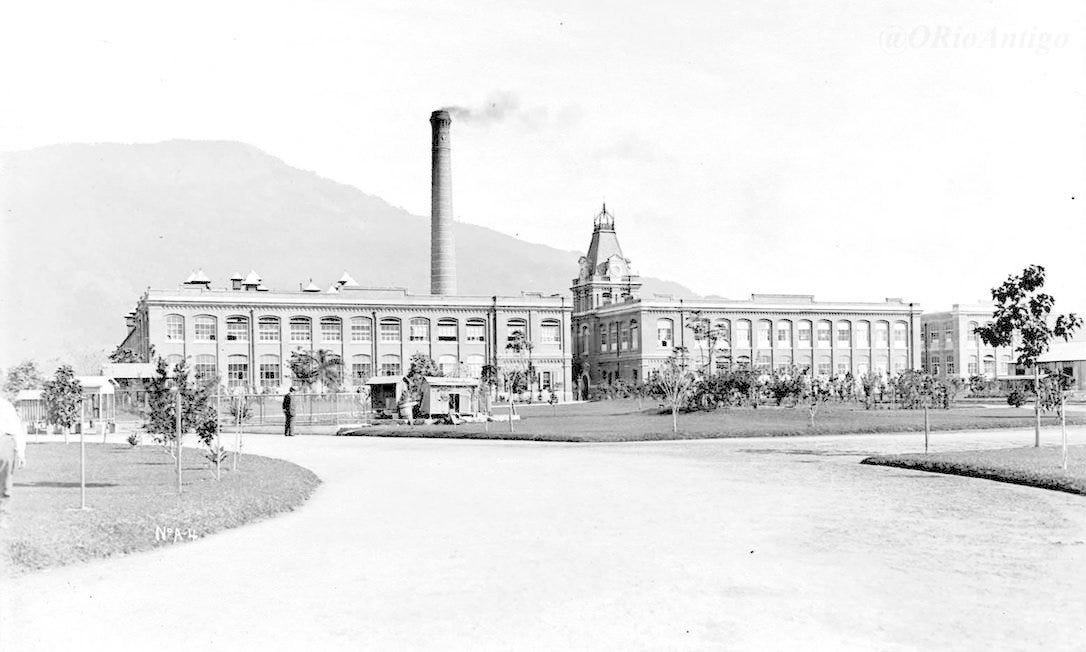
The Bangu Textile Factory in 1908, by Augusto Malta

During Pena's term, Brazil was also affected by the Panic of 1907, which caused a contraction of credit in international financial markets. Until then, the coffee stocks retained under the valorization program had been financed by credits from large foreign importers and guaranteed by the state of São Paulo. The crisis prevented their renewal and temporarily reduced the inflow of foreign capital into Brazil. Fearing that a simultaneous fall in coffee prices would worsen the country's external position and drain the reserves of the Caixa de Conversão, thus threatening the recently established gold standard itself, the government abandoned its initial refusal to support the valorization program and agreed to guarantee a longer-term foreign loan through its bankers in London. The international crisis resulted in a brief recession in the 1907–1908 period, with Brazil's GDP falling by 3.2% in 1908. However, according to Winston Fritsch, the return of capital inflows in 1908, caused by the normalization of international conditions during that year, together with the rise in rubber prices, led to the beginning of an economic boom that lasted until 1913.

The large inflow of foreign capital into Brazil, generated by coffee exports, and the measures aimed at curbing the expansion of coffee crops adopted in the Taubaté Agreement, made it possible to expand the industrial sector during the period. In an industrial census conducted in 1907, 3,258 companies were counted, which together employed 149,018 factory workers for a total real production of 1 trillion réis. Still, 49% of the country's industrial production was concentrated in the Federal District and São Paulo. According to Richard Graham, by 1907 Brazil was "producing more than half of its needs in cottons, shoes and leather goods, hats, matches, beer, macaroni and similar products, all of which had once been entirely imported, not to mention items which had often come from abroad like bricks, earthenware, and candy". According to a modern estimate by the Brazilian Institute of Geography and Statistics, Brazil's GDP grew at an annual average of 2.6% from 1907 to 1909 in 1999 BRL values.

=== Foreign policy ===
==== Border issues ====
Brazilian borders in 1908

Pena nominated the Baron of Rio Branco, Brazil's "Bismarckian" minister, to the ministry of foreign affairs, an office Paranhos had occupied since 1902. One of Brazil's main concerns during the First Republic was to settle its border disputes with neighboring countries. During Pena's government, Brazil resolved border issues with Colombia and Peru.

With Colombia, the Vásquez Cobo–Martins treaty was signed on 24 April 1907, by which Brazil ceded navigation rights in the Amazon basin in exchange for recognition of its territorial claims in the region. The disputed region, between the Japurá and Negro rivers, was the target of jurisdictional conflicts between Brazilians and Colombians. In his report to president Pena, Rio Branco declared that the treaty represented "a prudent transaction because it forever dispels old concerns about conflicts that have already occurred in the uncertain border region and where they would only increase given the development of activity and private interests that takes place there".

As for Peru, Brazil later signed a treaty on 8 September 1909, by which the borders between both countries were settled and general principles regarding commerce and navigation were defined. Peru claimed a total area of 442,000 square kilometers, including a considerable part of the Brazilian state of Amazonas and the entire territory of Acre. Since 1897 there had been clashes between Brazilian and Peruvian settlers in the border region, which were becoming increasingly violent and threatened relations between the two countries. The treaty was negotiated based on the uti possidetis doctrine: of the 442,000 square kilometers claimed by Peru, 403,000 were attributed to Brazil, ending the dispute between the two countries that had been going on since 1863, when the Peruvian government began to claim the territory. Border issues with Venezuela and British Guiana were also resolved.

==== The Hague Convention ====
In 1907 the Second Peace Convention was held in The Hague; its goals were to stop the arms race taking place at the time and establish peaceful means of resolving international disputes. Brazil had been invited to take part in the First Convention of 1899, but refused. In 1907 it sent a delegation led by Ruy Barbosa. With a larger number of participating nations, the convention also included several Latin American countries, such as Argentina, Chile, and Colombia, who took part in the talks at the insistence of U.S. president Theodore Roosevelt. The 1907 convention was broader in scope than the previous one, and sought to establish "more jurisdicity between people-to-people relations" and "as far as possible, replace will with law, violence with reason, intolerance with justice", in the words of Batista Pereira, a member of the Brazilian delegation.

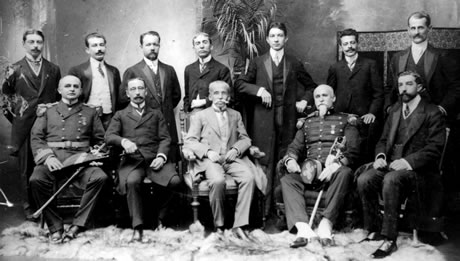
The Brazilian delegation in The Hague (Note: Standing, from left to right: Antonio Batista Pereira, José Rodrigues Alves, Rodrigo Otávio de Langgaard Meneses, Artur de Carvalho Moreira, Abelardo Roças, Leopoldo de Magalhães Castro, Fernando Gustavo Dobbert. Seated, from left to right: Tancredo B. de Moura, Eduardo F. R. dos Santos Lisboa, Ruy Barbosa, Roberto Trompowsky Leitão de Almeida e Carlos Lemgruber Kropf.)

For Brazil, the 1907 convention marked the beginning of the country's participation in the major international conferences. At the head of the Brazilian delegation, Ruy Barbosa played a prominent role by defending legal equality between the states and opposing the use of force. Barbosa recalled how Brazil had taken part in the Alabama Claims, under the Treaty of Washington of 1871, when a Brazilian envoy, Marcos Antônio de Araújo, was appointed by Emperor Pedro II to be one of the arbitrators. His position became clear when discussing the creation of an Arbitration Court of Justice, during which he argued that such a court was in the interest of all nations and that its members should be appointed without regard to each country's relative importance. Through Ruy Barbosa, Brazil presented its case for democratizing the international system and defied the exclusive role played by the world's great powers in dealing with international affairs in the 19th century.

In a speech in Paris on 31 October 1907, Barbosa remarked that "in an assembly convened to organize peace, votes cannot be classified according to the states' preparedness for war". Despite his pacifism, Barbosa believed that curbing the arms race was less achievable, due to the difficulty of creating a formula that met the conflicting interests of the many participating countries. Nevertheless, on 23 July 1907 he proposed that no power should seek to alter its territories through war unless the other party refused to submit to arbitration or violated arbitration terms. A radical position at the time, the proposal did not gain support, but it became a precedent for the modern principle of prohibition of acquiring territories by force.

Brazil's stance at the convention was not without negative reactions both from the press and the adherents of the old hierarchical diplomatic practices. In William T. Stead's words: "[i]t was said that the Conference could never stand this Dr. Ruy Barbosa. But it soon learned to put up with him and it didn't take long for it to find out that he was one of its most powerful members. The two great forces of the Conference were Baron Marshall, from Germany, and Dr. Ruy Barbosa, from Brazil. Baron Marshall had in his favor the entire powerful army of the German Empire, a circumstance that he never tired of boasting about. Dr. Ruy only had a distant and unknown Republic, incapable of military action and with a squadron still in the shipyards. However, at the end of the Conference, Dr. Ruy Barbosa had subjugated the most powerful of its members".

==== Argentina ====
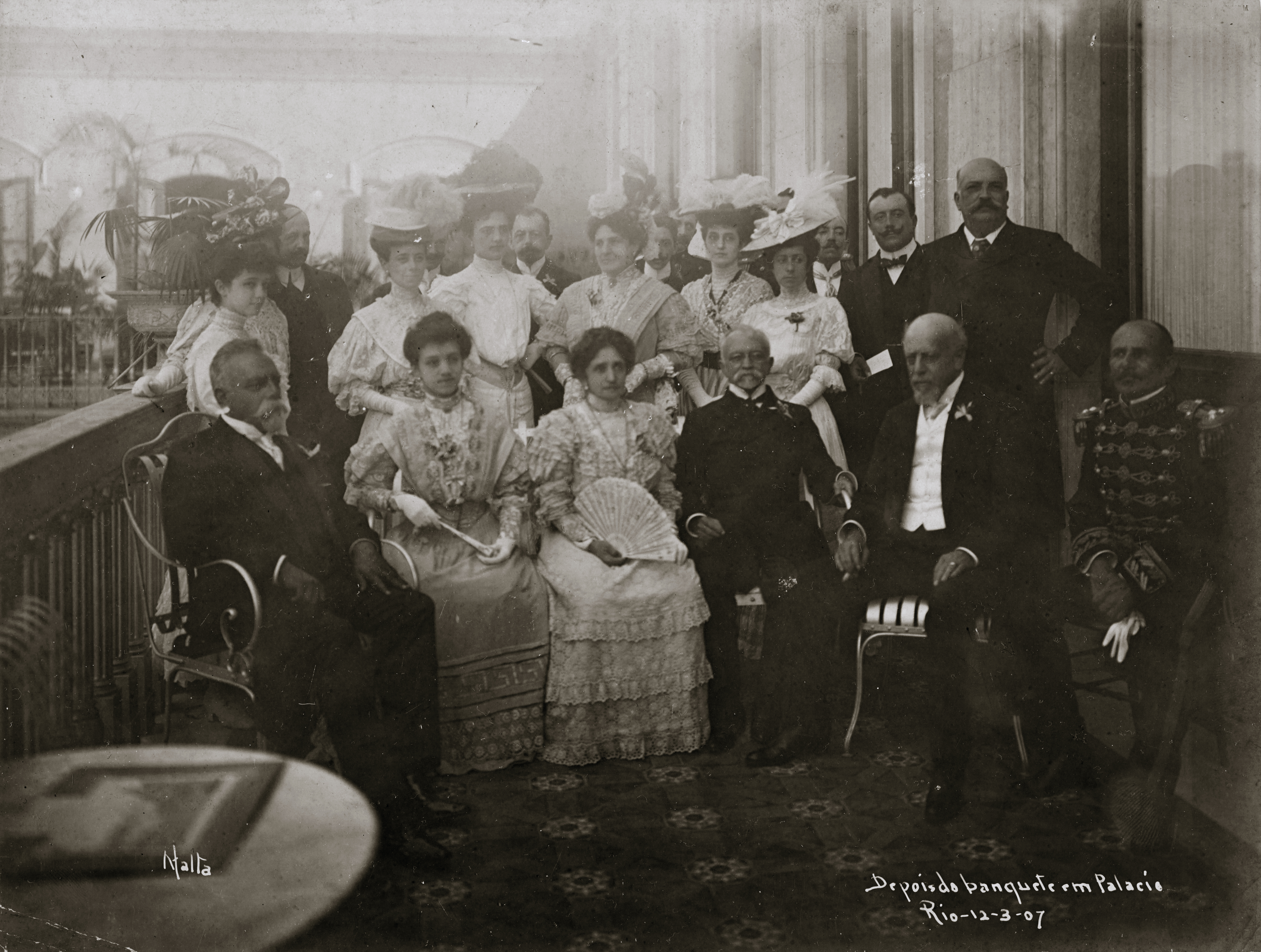
Pena (fourth from left, front row) with his wife to his right, former Argentine president Julio Argentino Roca to his left, and other dignitaries at the Catete Palace, 12 March 1907

The fear of war between Brazil and Argentina increased during the period, encouraging militarization in both countries and reaching a peak in 1908, when the two nations hovered on the brink of war. At the time, the "armed peace" doctrine was common on the international scene and was also applied in Argentine–Brazilian relations. In 1902, when Rio Branco assumed the Ministry of Foreign Affairs, Brazil's foreign policy shifted to the goal of achieving hegemony in the Southern Cone. (Note: One of Rio Branco's objectives was the rapprochement between Brazil, Argentina and Chile in order to ensure peace in the Southern Cone. This was based on Rio Branco's idea of "cordial political intelligence" which, in turn, was based on the "entente cordiale". Despite his peaceful intentions, Rio Branco still argued that Brazil needed "a minimum of military apparatus in order to, in an eventuality, support positions adopted at the international level", Candeas 2017, p. 180; Binelo 2016, pp. 1–3.) Tensions between both countries began in 1904, when the Brazilian Congress approved the naval rearmament program, which threatened Argentine naval dominance in the South Atlantic Ocean and caused distrust regarding Brazil's perceived imperialist intentions. (Note: The Brazilians argued that, due to the Dreadnoughts' size, they would not be able to navigate on the River Plate and thus there was no reason for concern, Binelo 2016, p. 3.) The situation worsened when Figueroa Alcorta became president of Argentina in 1906. Alcorta appointed Estanislao Zeballos, a longtime rival of Rio Branco, as minister of foreign affairs. (Note: Zeballos' first disagreement with Rio Branco had occurred in 1875. That year, when Argentine envoy Carlos Tejedor left Rio de Janeiro without greeting the Brazilian emperor, Rio Branco wrote in the newspaper A Nação that there had been "no international offense against Brazil. There was only a gaucherie". Zeballos misunderstood the term gaucherie as gauchada, i.e. acting like a gaucho and replied: "[o]ne of the most important newspapers in Brazil described Mr. Tejedor's withdrawal as a gaucherie. This way of expressing oneself is nothing more than a crude monkey-like antic. It's better to be a gaucho than a monkey", Heinsfeld, pp. 1–2.) Convinced of Brazil's "political and military resurgence", Zeballos sought to diplomatically isolate Brazil, prevent its naval buildup, and improve Argentina's relations with Uruguay and Paraguay.

Argentine newspapers such as La Prensa attacked Brazil and defended arms acquisitions for Argentina, whose navy, once the strongest in South America, had fallen behind Brazil's. Zeballos accused Brazil of breaking the naval balance of power between the two countries and believed that Brazil was "excessively arming its navy". The Argentine minister led an extensive anti-Brazilian campaign in the press, which prompted some political circles in Argentina to seek his removal from office. In 1908, Ruy Barbosa warned president Afonso Pena that the Argentines could launch a surprise attack and, in Stanley E. Hilton's words, "Brazilian strategists became convinced that the country could suddenly find itself at war".

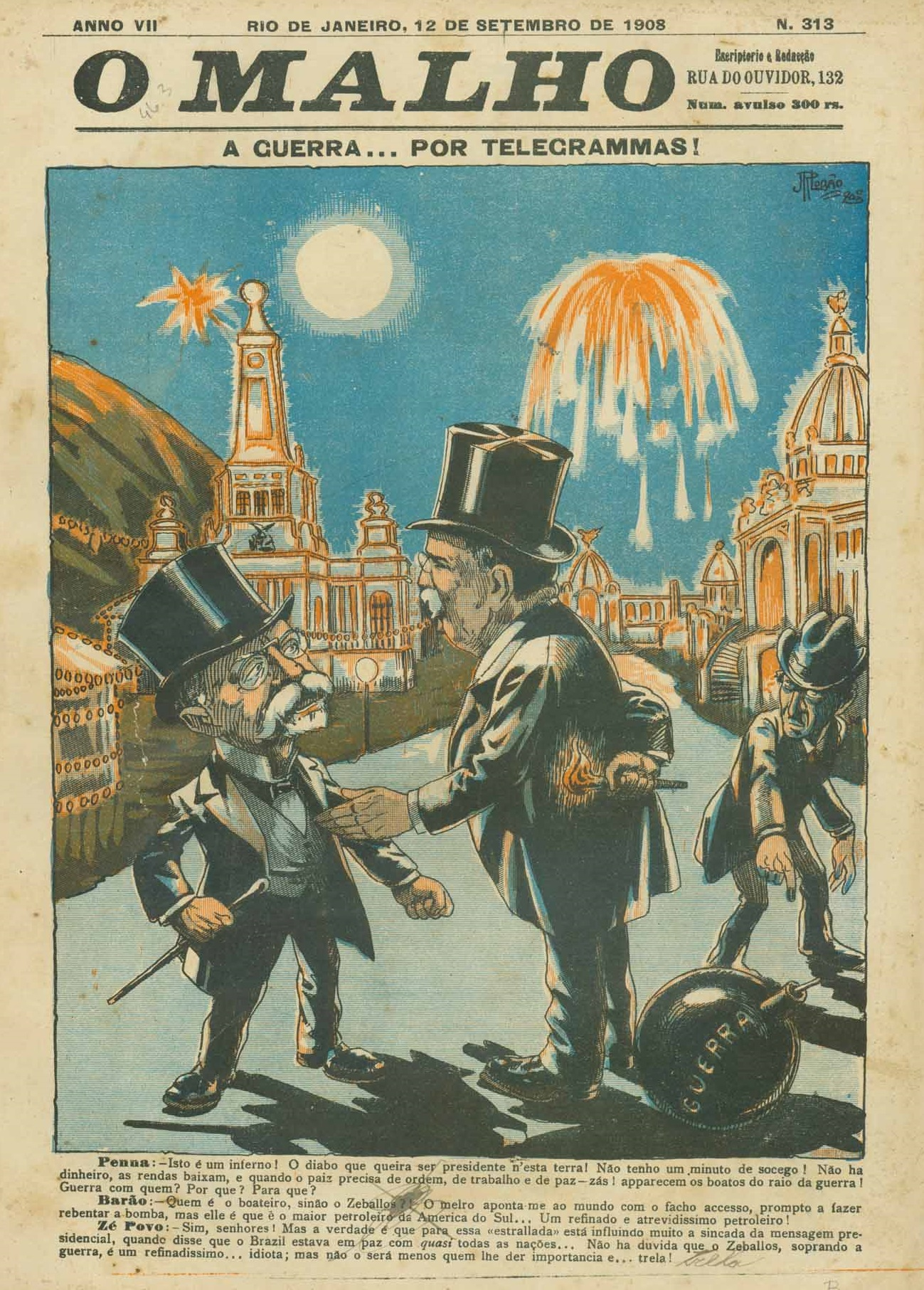
"The war... by telegrams!", O Malho cover, 12 September 1908

That year, Zeballos sent a secret letter to Roque Sáenz Peña, the Argentine minister plenipotentiary to Spain, in which he stated that he had written evidence signed by Rio Branco that Brazil was preparing to attack Argentina. Zeballos then detailed his plan: Argentina would demand that Brazil give it one of its dreadnoughts that were under construction. If Brazil refused, Argentina would deliver an ultimatum giving Brazil eight days to settle the issue, after which the Argentine Navy would attack Rio de Janeiro, which the Argentine ministers claimed was a "well studied and easy point, due to Brazil's defenseless situation". The secret plan was discussed with president Alcorta and his cabinet on 10 June, and two days later Zeballos would present it to Congress with the "secret documents" signed by Rio Branco in order to request funds to mobilize the military. However, the plan was leaked in the Argentine press on 11 June, which alarmed public opinion, harmed Zeballos' image, and caused the plan to be aborted. Under pressure, Alcorta then asked Zeballos to resign his position as foreign minister and assume the Ministry of Justice and Public Instruction. Zeballos refused that proposal but presented his resignation on 16 June 1908.

Despite resigning, Zeballos continued to claim he had documents signed by Rio Branco in which Brazil's aggressive intentions were evident. One of these documents, known as Telegram No. 9, was an encrypted note sent by Rio Branco to Domício da Gama, the Brazilian minister in Santiago, Chile. The telegram, dated 17 June 1908, was intercepted, decrypted, and its content was distorted and published in the press by Zeballos. In the falsified version, Rio Branco instructed Domício da Gama to disseminate claims of "the 'imperialist' pretensions of the Argentine Republic, letting it be known in the high political circles that in its vanity it dreams of the domination of Bolivia, Paraguay, Uruguay and also our Rio Grande". The altered version was read by the new Argentine foreign minister, Victorino de la Plaza, in the Senate, which pushed Congress to approve the arms build-up and shifted public opinion against Brazil. Rio Branco promptly denied the allegations, stating that the document was "absolutely false" and the accusations could only be the product of "some man of the most exquisite bad faith".

Zeballos then claimed, through La Prensa, that he had photographs of the documents and challenged Rio Branco "to review his secret Pacific archive and read the original document that exists in it, with the following addresses: "17 June 1908, at 06:57, number 9". La Prensa wrote that Rio Branco would need "to prove that he had not promoted anything hostile to the Argentine Republic, in the spirit of any American chancellery". In an unexpected move, Rio Branco then published the Brazilian cipher and the original message in order to prove that the Argentine version was false and that there were no aggressive Brazilian plans against Argentina. The situation caused enormous embarrassment in Argentine political circles. Demoralized, Zeballos was removed from the Foreign Ministry. After his fall, relations between Argentina and Brazil gradually improved, and the ABC Pact, based on Rio Branco's "cordial political intelligence", was negotiated. Rio Branco later stated: "[m]ore than ever, we need to put ourselves in a state of defense against this neighbor, since crazy people like Zeballos can stir up opinion there".

==== United States ====
The Great White Fleet in Rio de Janeiro, Kósmos magazine, January 1908

Pena retained Joaquim Nabuco as Brazil's ambassador to the United States, a position he had held since 1905. Before taking office, the president had assured Nabuco that he wanted his cooperation during his government, in whichever position the diplomat deemed he could best serve the country. Nabuco favored a close relationship with Washington, through which he hoped to make Brazil an intermediary between the United States and Latin America within the Monroe Doctrine's framework. However, his views did not always coincide with those of Rio Branco, whom he criticized for failing to give the desired rapprochement a consistent direction. At the Hague Convention of 1907, disagreements between the Brazilian and American delegations had strained relations between the two countries. Nabuco later tried to remedy this by persuading Ruy Barbosa to visit the United States as a gesture of friendship, but Barbosa refused.

In January 1908, the Great White Fleet visited Rio de Janeiro, where its officers and sailors were welcomed with celebrations and the local newspapers printed special editions in English. During the visit, Pena exchanged messages with President Theodore Roosevelt and announced a reduction in tariffs on certain American products. According to historian Thomas A. Bailey, the announcement was favorably received in the United States, and the visit improved relations between the two countries.

== Succession crisis and death ==
The issue of Afonso Pena's succession divided the groups that supported his government. The president favored David Campista, one of the most prominent members of the "kindergarten", as his successor for the upcoming presidential election. Campista's candidacy, however, was met with resistance. Despite being intellectually distinguished and aligned with Pena's program, Campista lacked political skills and had no support base. Carlos Peixoto and Miguel Calmon preferred João Pinheiro, on a ticket that would bring together Minas Gerais and Bahia. Pena maintained his preference for Campista, whose work on the Caixa de Conversão and the coffee valorization was expected to secure support from São Paulo. João Pinheiro's death in 1908 further complicated the negotiations.

In turn, Pinheiro Machado supported Hermes da Fonseca, with Venceslau Brás as his running mate, aiming to align Minas Gerais and Rio Grande do Sul against Pena, who was then left with little support in his own state and only mild backing from São Paulo. Brás, himself a representative of the traditional Minas Gerais oligarchy, had succeeded João Pinheiro as state president and refused to support Campista's candidacy, warning that it would not be well received outside Pena's inner circle. Faced with this situation, Campista withdrew his candidacy.

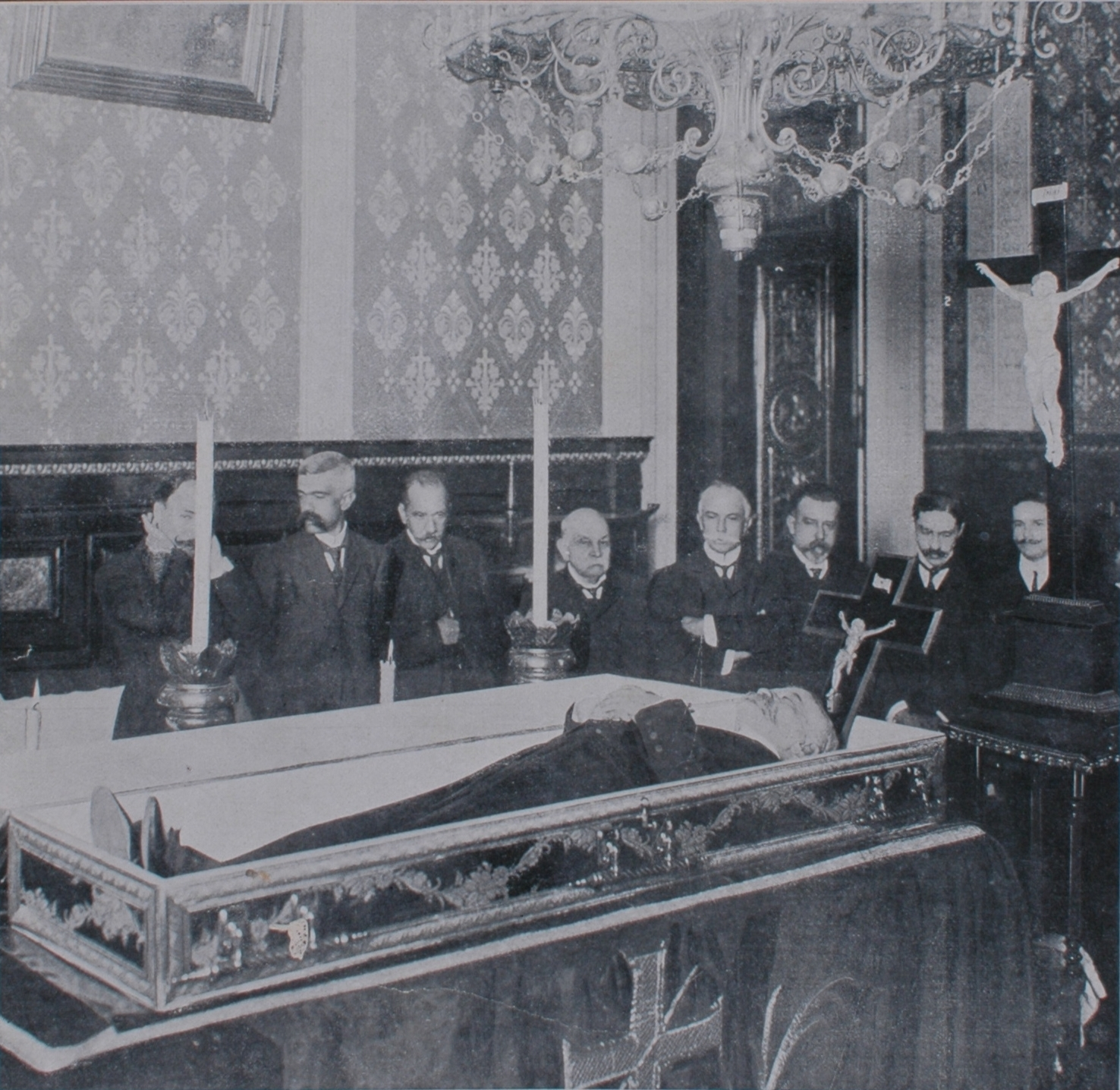
Pena lying in state at the Catete Palace, 15 June 1909

Amid the ongoing disputes, Afonso Pena died in the afternoon of 14 June 1909 at the Catete Palace, from severe pneumonia, the symptoms of which had worsened the night before. A medical commission consisting of doctors A. A. Azeredo Sodré, Benjamin A. da Rocha and Miguel Couto was formed that morning. At 09:30 the commission issued its first report on the president's health, stating that he was in serious condition. A few hours later it issued another report stating that his condition had not worsened. At 14:15, surrounded by his family and ministers, the president collapsed; after regaining consciousness, he passed out for the last time and died. According to doctor Miguel Couto, Afonso Pena's last words were "God, fatherland, liberty and family".

Minister Augusto Tavares de Lira then sent telegrams to vice president Nilo Peçanha, summoning him to assume office, and to the states' presidents, giving them the news of the president's death, which caused widespread mourning in Brazil and abroad. Several countries expressed condolences, including Argentina, Belgium, Bolivia, Chile, France, Portugal, Russia, Spain, the United Kingdom, and the United States. According to Cláudia Viscardi, Pena's illness had been worsened by the deaths of his son Álvaro and one of his brothers, and the succession crisis. His wake was held at the government palace and, on 16 June, his remains were buried in the São João Batista Cemetery. Peçanha served as president for the remainder of Pena's term. Following the president's death, the "Governors' Policy" began to break down, as once again no consensus was reached among the oligarchies regarding the presidential succession.

In reaction to Fonseca's bid, a broad civilian coalition—consisting of intellectuals, professionals, liberal politicians, and sectors of the urban middle class—launched the so-called "Civilist Campaign" and nominated Ruy Barbosa, who defended constitutionalism and electoral reform, in contrast to Fonseca's military profile. Concerned with the coffee valorization plan, which Pinheiro Machado had opposed, the São Paulo oligarchy eventually supported Barbosa, who also received support from some political groups in Bahia, his home state, and Minas Gerais, including members of the "kindergarten". The 1910 presidential election thus went down as the most contested in the First Republic up to that point. Fonseca won the election and succeeded Peçanha on 15 November 1910.

== Historical reputation and image ==
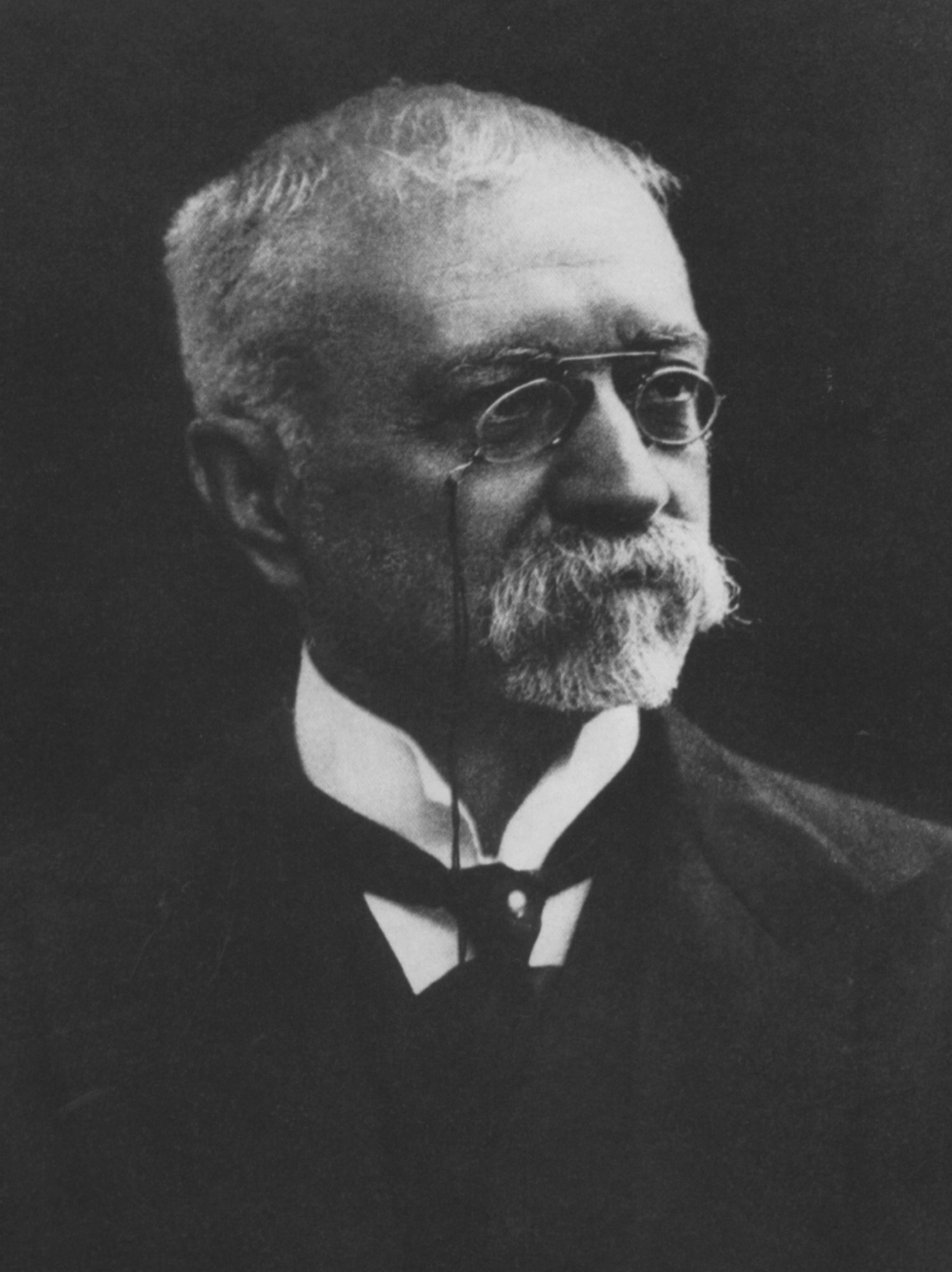
Pena, c. 1906

According to historian José Murilo de Carvalho, Afonso Pena was seen as one of the most prominent political figures of his time. José Anchieta da Silva said of him: "a monarchist, he was an exponent of the Republic, becoming an uncompromising defender of order and legality, guaranteeing the consolidation of the nascent Republic". In Afonso Arinos de Melo Franco's view, Pena was a "typical Minas Gerais liberal". Bárbara Lima remarked that Pena was the only member of emperor Pedro II's cabinet to become president of Brazil. Minister Tavares de Lira described Pena as a "vigilant and helpful man", remarking that the president was "a true representative of the old school of Imperial statesmen".

The president's contemporaries admired the elegance and "finesse" of his political style. Assis Cintra described him as "kind, intelligent, and admirably correct in his actions". In Lacombe's description, Pena fit the "typical Minas Gerais temperament", being "parsimonious, prudent, confident and tenacious". For José Anchieta da Silva, the president was "a simple man with restrained habits, [...] not inclined to ostentation". Silva also stated that "Pena shared the views of the French philosopher Condorcet, who believed that life at the top was nothing more than a "whirlwind without pleasure, vanity without reason, and idleness without rest". For Américo Lacombe, Pena felt that transformations in the country were inevitable and sought to get closer to the values of the new generation.

In Steven Topik's evaluation, Pena held developmentalist views and his government "represented a fusion of the interventionist tendencies of the [Brazilian] Empire with the new realities of the Republic". Likewise, for Cláudia Viscardi, out of all the presidents of the First Brazilian Republic, Afonso Pena was the most committed to the country's industrial development, without neglecting its predominant agricultural interests. Viscardi also remarked that David Campista's tenure as finance minister marked a rare moment in which heterodox economic ideas were put into practice during the First Republic. For Pedro Calmon, the Pena administration, rather than addressing issues through a regional lens, treated them as national in scope, carrying forward Rodrigues Alves' program, "at a pace that, for the first time, reflected a global view of the Brazilian economy".

== Legacy ==
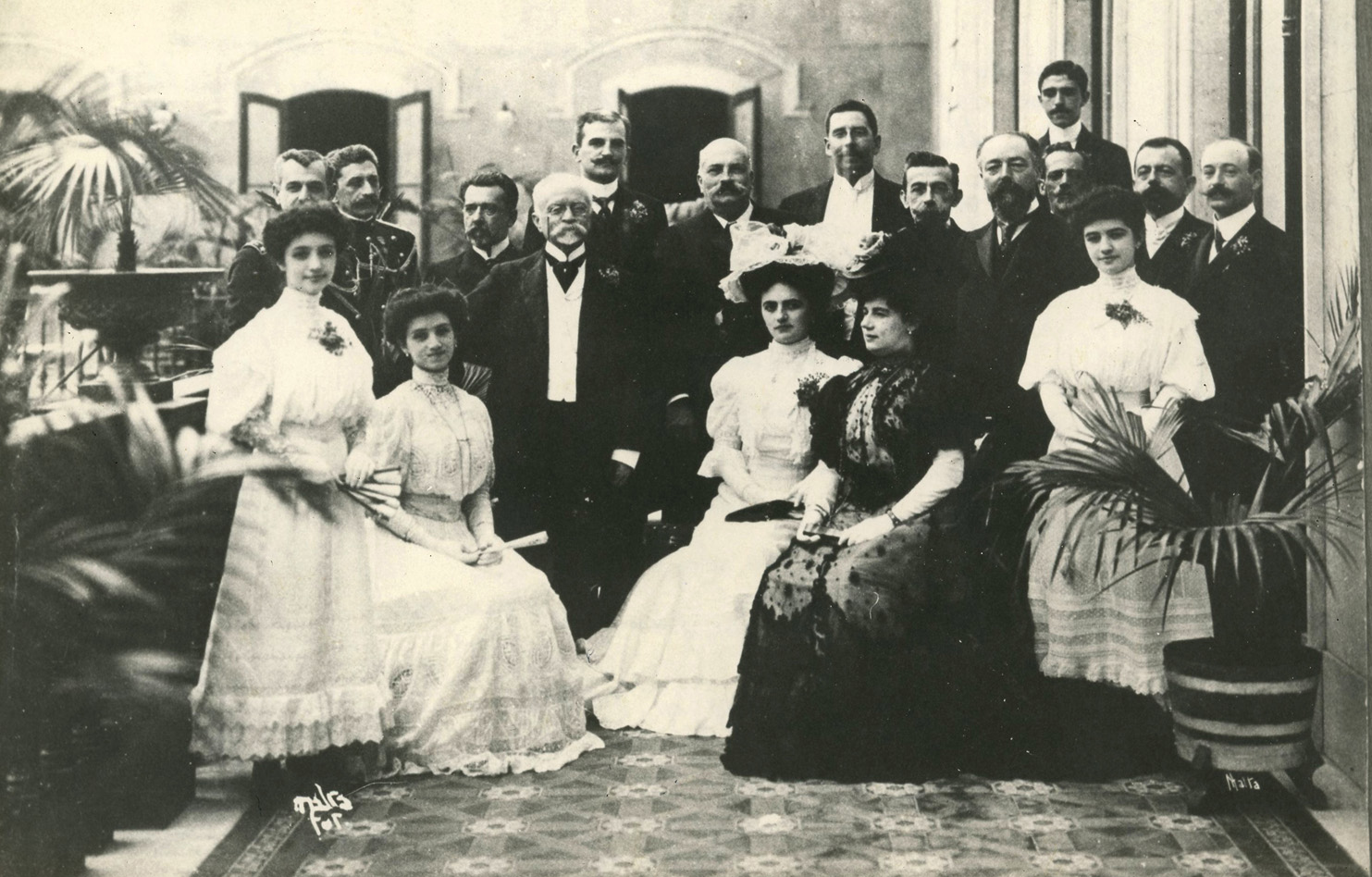
Afonso Pena and other dignitaries in 1907, including Paul Doumer, the future president of France

In Gabriel Rossini's assessment, despite having resulted in diversification of investment, the Taubaté Agreement did not solve the issue of overproduction of coffee, leading, on the contrary, to the expansion of planting, since profits remained high. Therefore, new valorization programs had to be adopted in the following years, culminating in the "permanent defense of coffee" in 1924. In turn, the Caixa de Conversão operated successfully until the beginning of the First World War, when coffee and rubber prices fell and there was a decline in foreign capital inflows to Brazil, reversing the favorable external scenario that allowed it to operate since 1906. As a result, there was a significant drop in money supply, with a deterioration in economic activity and public finances, leading to the abandonment of the gold-standard in the country. In Calmon's view, the Caixa de Conversão would later prove disastrous, when the government authorized it to issue more bills in 1910, which, coupled with the budget deficits recorded from 1908 onward, led to an oversupply of fiat currency. No new currency had been issued since 1898 and so the convertible bills issued by the Caixa de Conversão began to replace non-convertible ones, to the point that 40% of the circulating currency was already convertible by 1912. According to Steven Topik, "Brazil would never again be able to come so close to total convertibility".

Favorable historical assessments often contrast the "social peace" during the presidencies of Afonso Pena and his predecessor Rodrigues Alves with the troubled period of Floriano Peixoto, pointing to the years between 1902 and 1909 as the "high period" of Brazil's Old Republic. Historian João Camilo de Olivera Torres remarked that, although the Brazilian Republic "had never known peace", struggles in Brazil would assume "a more conscious and sustained character" from the succession of Afonso Pena onward. According to Rubens Ricupero, the end of Pena's term and the rise of Hermes da Fonseca marked the beginning of a long period of agony for the First Brazilian Republic, that would ultimately culminate in its fall in 1930.

== Homages ==
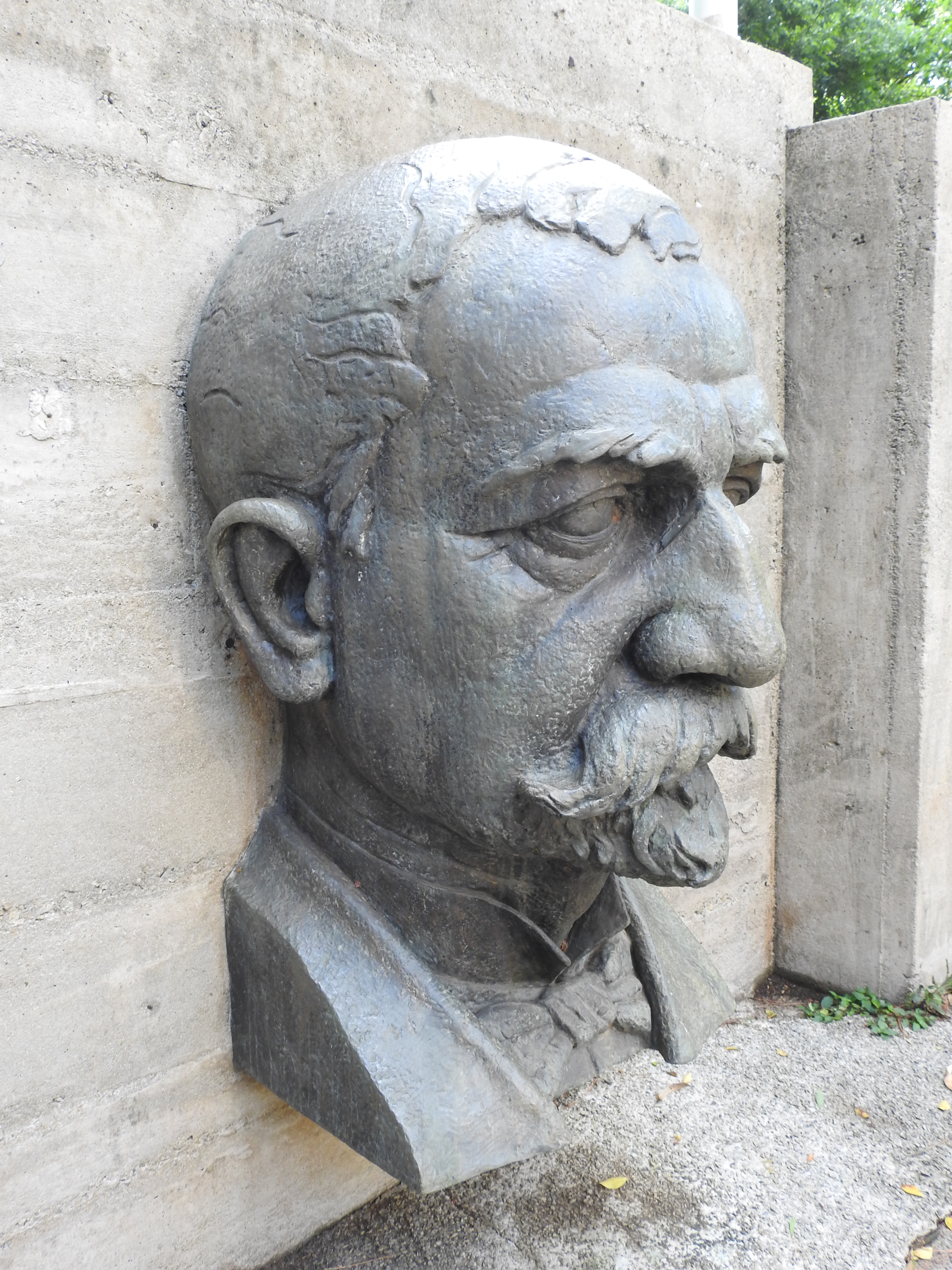
A bust of Pena in the Municipal Park of Belo Horizonte

Days after Afonso Pena's death, Ruy Barbosa stated in a speech in the Senate that "[i]f public service has its martyrs, we have never witnessed the most singular example of this experience". In a session of the Brazilian Historic and Geographic Institute, held on 30 June 1909, the Baron of Rio Branco stated that "[a]ll of Brazil, which also accompanied him in this undertaking, does him the justice of believing in the purity of his intentions, seeing in him a true statesman eager to assure us the peace that we so desperately need and that all people need". The following year, Francisco Campos, then a student at the Faculty of Law, gave a lecture next to Pena's herm, in which he stated "every institution is the elongated shadow of a man". Years later, Mário Casasanta, a teacher at the faculty, remarked that "Afonso Pena created a true school, and it is no small reason for glory for this generation that it managed to preserve it, to the best of its structure, because the presence of the ideals that nourished its founder's soul can still be felt within it".

Pena's name was given to the city of Penápolis, which emerged next to the Northwestern Brazil Railway in 1907, the city of Conselheiro Pena, which emerged next to the Vitória-Minas Railway, and the Academic Center of the Faculty of Law of the Federal University of Minas Gerais, the Afonso Pena Academic Center (CAAP – Centro Acadêmico Afonso Pena). As its founder and first director, the faculty itself is affectionately called Vetusta Casa de Afonso Pena (Old House of Afonso Pena) by its students, professors, and staff, as well as the entire academic and legal community that interacts with it.

In Belo Horizonte's Municipal Park there is a monument to the city's "founders", which features Afonso Pena alongside Augusto de Lima, Aarão Reis, and Bias Fortes. Pena also lends his name to the most important avenue in the city. Likewise, in Campo Grande, Mato Grosso do Sul, his name appears on the main avenue. He also lends his name to an important avenue in Porto Velho, Rondônia. He is also honored in São José dos Pinhais, Paraná, the city's main airport, Afonso Pena International Airport being named for him. In Santa Bárbara, Pena's hometown, a municipal law instituted the date of his death as "Afonso Pena Day".

=== Resting place ===
On 13 February 2009, the mausoleum and remains of Afonso Pena, his wife, and three of their children were transferred from the São João Batista Cemetery, in Rio de Janeiro, to the old colonial house where he was born, in the historic center of Santa Bárbara. Inaugurated in 1912, Pena's mausoleum was carved in Carrara marble by Rodolfo Bernardelli, a Mexican-born Brazilian artist who established himself in the country at the end of the 19th century. Surrounded by four columns, the mausoleum depicts a woman, representing the Brazilian Republic, crying over a three-ton headstone. In its dome there is a stained glass window with the Brazilian flag. The mausoleum's style is eclectic, mixing the neoclassical and art-nouveau styles. The house also hosts the Affonso Penna Memorial, which is open to visitors, who can see there the president's personal objects, as well as newspapers and family portraits.

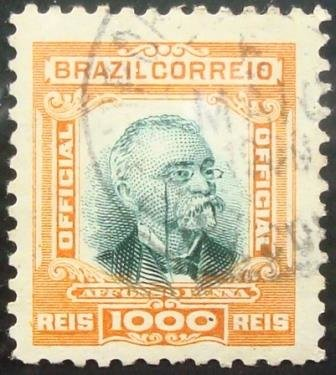
Afonso Pena on a 1906 stamp

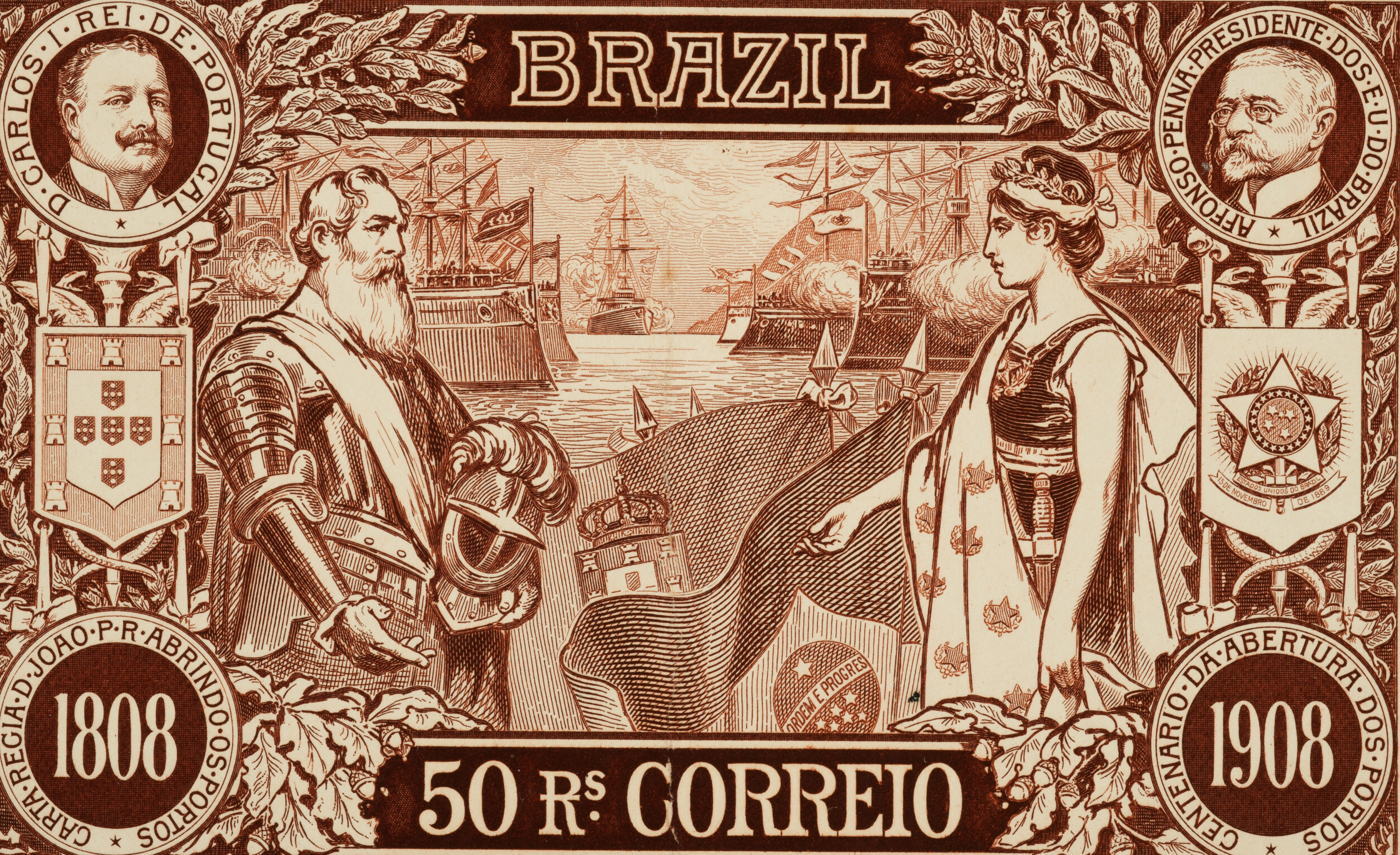
Afonso Pena and King Carlos I of Portugal on a 1908 postcard

== See also ==
- Brazilian Belle Époque
- List of presidents of Brazil

== Notes ==
Political offices
Preceded by Gama Cerqueira	Governor of Minas Gerais; 1892–1894	Succeeded by Bias Fortes
Preceded by Rosa e Silva	Vice President of Brazil; 1903–1906	Succeeded by Nilo Peçanha
Preceded by Rodrigues Alves	President of Brazil; 1906–1909	Succeeded by Nilo Peçanha
