= List of heads of state of Brazil =

This is the list of heads of state of Brazil, which brings together all monarchs and presidents who ruled over Brazil during all historical periods in the country's history.

== Colonial Brazil (1500–1815) ==
=== House of Aviz ===
Brazil was discovered by Portuguese navigators on 22 April 1500 and became a Portuguese colony.

Portrait	Monarch (Birth–Death)	Reign			Royal house	Succession
Portrait	Monarch (Birth–Death)	Reign start	Reign end	Duration	Royal house	Succession
	Manuel I, the Grocer-King; Manuel I, o Rei-Mercador (1469–1521)	22 April 1500	13 December 1521	21 years, 235 days	Aviz	Grandson of Edward I First cousin of John II
	John III, the Colonizer; João III, o Colonizador (1502–1557)	13 December 1521	11 June 1557	35 years, 180 days	Aviz	Son of Manuel I
	Sebastian I, the Desired; Sebastião I, o Desejado (1554–1578)	11 June 1557	4 August 1578	21 years, 54 days	Aviz	Grandson of John III
	Henry I, the Chaste; Henrique I, o Casto (1512–1580)	4 August 1578	31 January 1580	1 year, 180 days	Aviz	Brother of John III; Son of Manuel I Great-uncle of Sebastian I
	Anthony I, the Determined; António I, o Determinado (1531–1595)	24 July 1580 (Disputed)	1583 (Disputed)	2 years, 161 days	Aviz	Grandson of Manuel I Nephew of Henry I

=== House of Habsburg ===
The House of Habsburg, also known as the Philippine dynasty, was the house that ruled Portugal from 1580 to 1640. The dynasty started with the acclamation of Philip II of Spain as Philip I of Portugal in 1580, officially recognized in 1581 by the Portuguese Cortes at Tomar. Philip I swore to rule Portugal as a kingdom separate from his Spanish domains, under a personal union known as the Iberian Union.

Portrait	Monarch (Birth–Death)	Reign			Royal house	Succession
Portrait	Monarch (Birth–Death)	Reign start	Reign end	Duration	Royal house	Succession
	Philip I, the Prudent; Filipe I, o Prudente (1527–1598)	12 September 1580	13 September 1598	18 years, 1 day	Habsburg	Grandson of Manuel I Nephew of Henry I
	Philip II, the Pious; Filipe II, o Piedoso (1578–1621)	13 September 1598	31 March 1621	22 years, 199 days	Habsburg	Son of Philip I
	Philip III, the Oppressor; Filipe III, o Opressor (1605–1665)	31 March 1621	1 December 1640	19 years, 245 days	Habsburg	Son of Philip II

=== House of Braganza ===
The House of Braganza, also known as the Brigantine dynasty, came to power in 1640, when John II, Duke of Braganza, claimed to be the rightful heir of the defunct House of Aviz, as he was the great-great-grandson of King Manuel I. John was proclaimed King John IV, deposing the House of Habsburg in the Portuguese Restoration War.

Portrait	Monarch (Birth–Death)	Reign			Royal house	Succession
Portrait	Monarch (Birth–Death)	Reign start	Reign end	Duration	Royal house	Succession
	John IV, the Restorer; João IV, o Restaurador (1604–1656)	1 December 1640	6 November 1656	15 years, 341 days	Braganza	Great-great-grandson of Manuel I
	Afonso VI, the Victorious; Afonso VI, o Vitorioso (1643–1683)	6 November 1656	12 September 1683	26 years, 310 days	Braganza	Son of John IV
	Peter II, the Pacific; Pedro II, o Pacífico (1648–1706)	12 September 1683	9 December 1706	23 years, 88 days	Braganza	Brother of Afonso VI; Son of John IV
	John V, the Portuguese Sun-King; João V, o Rei-Sol Português (1689–1750)	9 December 1706	31 July 1750	43 years, 234 days	Braganza	Son of Peter II
	Joseph I, the Reformer; José I, o Reformador (1714–1777)	31 July 1750	24 February 1777	26 years, 208 days	Braganza	Son of John V
	Peter III, the Builder; Pedro III, o Edificador (1717–1786)	24 February 1777	25 May 1786	9 years, 90 days	Braganza	Brother of Joseph I Son of John V Husband of Maria I
	Maria I, the Pious; Maria I, a Piedosa (1734–1816)	24 February 1777	16 December 1815	38 years, 295 days	Braganza	Daughter of Joseph I

== Kingdom of Brazil (1815–1822) ==
The House of Braganza continued to rule over Brazil, and on 16 December 1815, Prince Regent John, the future King John VI, raised Brazil to the status of a kingdom, thus making his mother, Maria I, the reigning queen, the first monarch of Brazil. The next year, on 20 March 1816, John VI succeeded his mother as king of the united Luso-Brazilian monarchy.

Portrait	Monarch (Birth–Death)	Reign			Royal house	Succession
Portrait	Monarch (Birth–Death)	Reign start	Reign end	Duration	Royal house	Succession
	Maria I, the Mad; Maria I, a Louca (1734–1816)	16 December 1815	20 March 1816	95 days (39 years, 25 days)	Braganza	Daughter of Joseph I of Portugal
	John VI, the Clement; João VI, o Clemente (1767–1826)	20 March 1816	7 September 1822	6 years, 171 days	Braganza	Son of Maria I of Portugal

== Empire of Brazil (1822–1889) ==
The House of Braganza continued to rule over Brazil after Pedro I, son of John VI, was acclaimed the first Emperor of Brazil on 12 October 1822, having proclaimed the independence of Brazil from Portugal on 7 September 1822. He was later succeeded on 7 April 1831 by his son Pedro II, the last monarch of Brazil, who reigned for 58 years.

Portrait	Monarch (Birth–Death)	Reign			Royal house	Succession
Portrait	Monarch (Birth–Death)	Reign start	Reign end	Duration	Royal house	Succession
	Pedro I, the Liberator; Pedro I, o Libertador (1798–1834)	12 October 1822	7 April 1831	8 years, 177 days	Braganza	Son of John VI of Portugal and Brazil; Treaty of Rio de Janeiro
	Pedro II, the Magnanimous; Pedro II, o Magnânimo (1825–1891)	7 April 1831	15 November 1889	58 years, 222 days	Braganza	Son of Pedro I of Brazil

== First Republic (1889–1930) ==
Marshal Deodoro da Fonseca led a military coup d'état on 15 November 1889, which deposed Emperor Pedro II and extinguished the stable 74-year-old Brazilian monarchy. The parliamentary monarchy system was thus replaced by a presidential republic.

No.	Portrait	President (Birth–Death)	Elected	Term of office			Political party	Vice president
No.	Portrait	President (Birth–Death)	Elected	Took office	Left office	Time in office	Political party	Vice president
1		Deodoro da Fonseca (1827–1892)	1891	15 November 1889 (Note: In a military coup d'état on 15 November 1889, Marshal of the Army Deodoro da Fonseca overthrew the government of the Empire of Brazil, led by Prime Minister the Viscount of Ouro Preto. The unprecedented military coup against a prime minister appointed by the emperor and who enjoyed the confidence of the Chamber of Deputies quickly escalated to the proclamation of the republic on that same date; thus, Emperor Pedro II of Brazil was deposed by Marshal Deodoro da Fonseca and the monarchy was declared abolished. The Constitution then in force ceased to operate, and the Empire of Brazil, a unitary state, was replaced with a federal republic, each province of the empire becoming a state. Until the organization of the Republic's constitutional order, however, the central government appointed the governments of the several states. The imperial parliament (the General Assembly) was dissolved, and Deodoro formed a Provisional Government. Deodoro, as Head of the Provisional Government, could appoint and dismiss the other members of that government, and discharged by decree absolute legislative and executive powers. The Provisional Government was in effect a dictatorship, and remaining monarchist sentiment in society was repressed, as the government and the army were committed to the consolidation of the recently declared Republic. The imperial family and their descendants were banished from the country by decree of the Provisional Government, and the dynasty's exile was only revoked in 1920. On 15 January 1890, Deodoro, as head of the Provisional Government, assumed for himself the unique military rank of Generalissimo of Land and Sea. In 1890, elections for a constituent congress were held, but the Congress (made up of a Senate with equal representation of the newly declared states and of a Chamber of Deputies with delegations proportional to the size of the population of each state) was required to adopt a constitution that conformed to the republican system of government and to the federal model of state. Congress assembled in November 1890 and a draft constitution, prepared by a committee of republican jurists and politicians appointed by the Provisional Government, was submitted to Congress by the Head of the Provisional Government, and formed the basis for the congressional deliberations. The Constitution was promulgated by Congress on 24 February 1891. It confirmed the abolition of the parliamentary system of government and created a presidential executive, widely based on the model of the United States of America. Presidents and vice presidents were to be elected for 4 years, without the possibility of re-election, by direct popular ballot, but for the first presidential term, Congress was to conduct the election immediately after the adoption of the constitution. Subsequent presidents were to be elected on 1 March and inaugurated on 15 November, starting in the year 1894. Accordingly, under those transitional rules, on 25 February 1891, the day after the adoption of the constitution, Congress voted for president and vice president, and the then-Head of the Provisional Government, Generalissimo Deodoro da Fonseca, was elected to become the nation's first president. The voting for vice president took place immediately after the counting of the votes for president, and Marshal Floriano Peixoto was chosen by Congress to be the first vice president. The swearing in of Deodoro da Fonseca and Floriano Peixoto as president and vice president, respectively, took place on the following day, 26 February 1891, and that inauguration marked the termination of the Provisional Government.)	23 November 1891 (Note: In a coup d'état on 3 November 1891, President Deodoro da Fonseca shut down the National Congress and ruled by decree for a few weeks, attempting to suspend the Constitution and to establish a dictatorial regime in the fashion of the Spanish American caudillos. There was a reaction by the Brazilian Navy against Deodoro's coup (the First Revolt of the Armada) and Deodoro was forced to resign the presidency. Deodoro was effectively deposed by the forces loyal to the Constitution in a counter-coup d'état, but because he yielded to the demands of the Navy and agreed to resign the presidency, neither the constitutional impeachment process nor a formal overthrow without impeachment (that would also have been a violation of the Constitution, this time by the counter-coup forces) took place, and instead Deodoro's removal from office was formalized as a simple resignation. Many officers in the Brazilian Navy were still monarchists, opposed Deodoro, and only reluctantly accepted the newly-created Republic, but were unwilling to see it be transformed from a constitutional state into a dictatorship. Upon Deodoro's resignation on 23 November 1891, Vice President Floriano Peixoto succeeded to the presidency and reversed Deodoro's coup. The constitutional legal order was restored, Deodoro's dissolution of Congress was deemed null and void, and Deodoro's other acts since the coup were similarly declared invalid.)	2 years, 8 days	None (military)	Floriano Peixoto (military)
2		Floriano Peixoto (1839–1895)	—	23 November 1891	15 November 1894 (Note: Marshal of the Army Floriano Peixoto, Deodoro's vice president, succeeded to the presidency upon President Manuel Deodoro da Fonseca's resignation. The Constitution then in force stipulated that, whenever the presidency became vacant during the first half of presidential term, new elections should be summoned at once, and the vice president should serve as president only until the inauguration of a new elected president. Deodoro had resigned during the first half of his presidential term (he had been sworn in as president on 26 February 1891 to serve until 15 November 1894 and had resigned the office on 23 November 1891), but the new president, Floriano Peixoto, refused to summon new elections, arguing that the constitutional provision requiring new elections should only apply if the presidency had been vacated during the first half of the presidential term by a president elected by direct popular ballot under the permanent provisions of the Constitution. Floriano held that, because Deodoro and himself had been respectively elected president and vice president by the Constituent Congress under the transitional provisions of the Constitution, and because the Constitution directed that the first elections by direct popular ballot should be held on 1 March 1894 to choose the president that would be inaugurated on 15 November 1894 for the first regular four year term, no elections needed to take place in the wake of Deodoro's resignation, neither by Congress, nor by direct popular ballot. Accordingly, Floriano Peixoto continued to serve as president for the remainder of the first presidential term, that is, until 15 November 1894. Because his interpretation of the Constitution was disputed by several political forces and his manner was regarded as also dictatorial, Floriano faced many revolts (including the Second Revolt of the Armada, that the administration managed to defeat), and Floriano governed under state of siege, with the right of habeas corpus and several other constitutional rights suspended (in accordance with the emergency provisions of the Constitution), for most of his time in office. Floriano also took advantage of the emergency powers of the state of siege to further suppress remaining pockets of monarchist sentiment in society and in Brazil's political life, and for this reason he has been dubbed the "consolidator of the Republic". In 1894, he was succeeded by Prudente de Morais, the first president to be elected by direct popular ballot under the permanent provisions of the Constitution and also the first civilian to hold office as President of Brazil.)	2 years, 357 days	None (military)	Vacant
3		Prudente de Morais (1841–1902)	1894	15 November 1894	15 November 1898	4 years	PR Federal	Manuel Vitorino (PR Federal)
4		Campos Sales (1841–1913)	1898	15 November 1898	15 November 1902	4 years	PRP	Rosa e Silva (PR Federal)
5		Rodrigues Alves (1848–1919)	1902	15 November 1902	15 November 1906	4 years	PRP	Silviano Brandão (Note: Vice president-elect Silviano Brandão died on 25 September 1902, before his inauguration. Accordingly, on inauguration day, 15 November 1902, President Rodrigues Alves took office alone, and the vice presidency was declared vacant. As per the constitutional norms then in force, a special election was then summoned to choose a new vice president to serve the remainder of the four-year term.) (PRM)
5		Rodrigues Alves (1848–1919)	1902	15 November 1902	15 November 1906	4 years	PRP	Afonso Pena (Note: The special election for vice president, summoned to fill the vacancy provoked by the death of Vice president-elect Silviano Brandão, was held on 18 March 1903. Afonso Pena was elected to the vice presidency, taking office on 23 June 1903.) (PRM)
6		Afonso Pena (1847–1909)	1906	15 November 1906	14 June 1909 (Note: President Afonso Pena, elected to serve the 1906–1910 presidential term, died in office on 14 June 1909. Upon Afonso Pena's death, Vice President Nilo Peçanha became president and served during the remainder of the presidential term.)	2 years, 211 days	PRM	Nilo Peçanha (PRF)
7		Nilo Peçanha (1867–1924)	—	14 June 1909	15 November 1910	1 year, 154 days	PRF	Vacant
8		Hermes da Fonseca (1855–1923)	1910	15 November 1910	15 November 1914	4 years	PRC	Venceslau Brás (PRM)
9		Venceslau Brás (1868–1966)	1914	15 November 1914	15 November 1918	4 years	PRM	Urbano Santos (PRM)
—		Rodrigues Alves (1848–1919)	1918	Never took office (Note: Rodrigues Alves, who had been the 5th President of Brazil (1902–1906), was elected to serve as the 10th president in 1918 but fell ill with the Spanish flu before his inauguration, so that he was not able to attend it. His running-mate, Delfim Moreira took office as vice president and became acting president. Rodrigues Alves never took the oath of office before Congress to become the 10th president, as he did not recover from his illness and died. Delfim Moreira succeeded to the presidency upon the president-elect's death in January 1919.)			PRP	Delfim Moreira (PRM)
10		Delfim Moreira (1868–1920)	—	15 November 1918	28 July 1919 (Note: Vice President Delfim Moreira succeeded to the presidency upon the death of President-elect Rodrigues Alves, but, in accordance with the constitutional provisions then in force, since the vacancy of the presidency occurred in the first half of the four-year presidential term, new elections were summoned and Delfim Moreira served only until an elected president was chosen and inaugurated to finish the 1918–1922 presidential term.)	255 days	PRM	Vacant
11		Epitácio Pessoa (1865–1942)	1919	28 July 1919 (Note: Rodrigues Alves died on 16 January 1919. The extraordinary election summoned in accordance with the Constitution was held on 13 April 1919. Elected to finish the remainder of the 1918–1922 presidential term, Epitácio Pessoa took office on 28 July 1919. Upon the inauguration of President Epitácio Pessoa, Delfim Moreira ceased to be president, and returned to the office of vice president.)	15 November 1922	3 years, 110 days	PRM	Delfim Moreira (PRM)
11		Epitácio Pessoa (1865–1942)	1919	28 July 1919	15 November 1922	3 years, 110 days	PRM	Bueno de Paiva (Note: Vice President Delfim Moreira died on 1 July 1920. After his death, the vice presidency remained vacant until a new vice president was elected and inaugurated. Bueno de Paiva took office as vice president on 11 November 1920 to complete the remainder of the 1918–1922 term of office.) (PRM)
12		Artur Bernardes (1875–1955)	1922	15 November 1922	15 November 1926	4 years	PRM	Estácio Coimbra (PRB)
13		Washington Luís (1869–1957)	1926	15 November 1926	24 October 1930 (Note: President Washington Luís was deposed by the 1930 Revolution, marking the end of the First Republic era. The revolution broke out on 3 October 1930, and, after battles between revolutionary and government forces far from the capital, a military faction in the capital sided with the revolutionaries and deposed the President on 24 October 1930. Upon Washington Luís's overthrow, a provisional military junta seized power. Days later, on 3 November 1930, that military triumvirate would cede full authority to Getúlio Vargas, the leader of the revolutionary movement, who declared the 1891 Constitution abolished, dissolved Congress and formed a provisional government, promising the creation of a new constitutional order.)	3 years, 343 days	PRP	Melo Viana (PRM)
—		Júlio Prestes (1882–1946)	1930	Never took office (Note: Júlio Prestes, elected on 1 March 1930, never took office due to the 1930 coup that deposed his predecessor Washington Luís.)			PRP	Vital Soares (PRB)

== Vargas Era (1930–1946) ==
The Vargas Era, encompassing the Second Brazilian Republic and Third Brazilian Republic (Estado Novo), began following the Revolution of 1930. Washington Luís was deposed on 24 October 1930, and the Brazilian military junta took power. Getúlio Vargas then assumed leadership from the junta on 3 November 1930.

No.	Portrait	President (Birth–Death)	Elected	Term of office			Political party	Vice president
No.	Portrait	President (Birth–Death)	Elected	Took office	Left office	Time in office	Political party	Vice president
—		Tasso Fragoso	—	24 October 1930	3 November 1930	10 days	None (1930 junta)	Vacant
—		Isaías de Noronha	—	24 October 1930	3 November 1930	10 days	None (1930 junta)	Vacant
—		Mena Barreto	—	24 October 1930	3 November 1930	10 days	None (1930 junta)	Vacant
14		Getúlio Vargas (1882–1954)	1934	3 November 1930 (Note: Getúlio Vargas governed by decree from 3 November 1930 to 20 July 1934, as Head of the Provisional Government, with absolute powers. On 9 July 1932 a revolution broke out in the State of São Paulo, demanding the restoration of constitutional government. The revolution was defeated by the Government, but it led to Vargas finally making good on his promise to summon a Constituent Assembly. The 1933–1934 Constituent Assembly promulgated Brazil's new Constitution on 16 July 1934, and, under the Constitution's transitional provisions, the first president was to be elected by the Assembly, and subsequent presidents were to be elected by direct popular ballot. In accordance with those rules, on 17 July 1934, the Constituent Assembly voted for president, and Vargas won the election. Accordingly, Vargas, who until then was Head of the Provisional Government, was sworn in as President of the Republic on 20 July 1934, for a term of office that would last until the inauguration of a successor on 3 May 1938. However, on 10 November 1937, Vargas led a coup d'état and proclaimed the Estado Novo dictatorship, imposing a new Constitution that allowed him to rule by decree. Both the referendum provided in the 1937 Constitution that would have confirmed the adoption of the new constitutional legislation, and the elections provided in the 1937 Constitution were never held, under the pretext of a state of emergency. Accordingly, Vargas effectively extended his term of office indefinitely. State governors were replaced by federal interventors appointed by the president of the Republic, and the Legislative chambers in both federal and state level were dissolved. The new Legislative bodies created by the 1937 Constitution were never elected, due to the state of emergency that lasted until the end of the regime, and accordingly, during that whole period (1937–1945) the president of the Republic and the interventors appointed to the several states discharged both executive and legislative powers, on a theoretically provisional, but effectively permanent, basis. Political parties were abolished, and opposition to the regime was suppressed. Thus, under the Estado Novo, President Vargas ruled Brazil as a dictator, until he was deposed by the military, in an insurrection led by Vargas's own Minister of War, on 29 October 1945.)	29 October 1945 (Note: By 1945, Vargas was under strong pressure from his own supporters to reform his authoritarian Estado Novo regime and to allow for the restoration of democratic freedoms in Brazil. On 28 February 1945, the dictator yielded to those mounting demands and signed a statute granting amnesty to his opponents, amending the 1937 Constitution and finally summoning elections for the parliament it had established, that had never assembled. The elections were to be held on 2 December 1945. The legislature would have the power to reform the Constitution; a further statute issued on 28 May 1945 also scheduled presidential elections for 2 December. On 2 October, the Superior Electoral Court ruled that the parliament's powers to reform the Constitution would be unlimited. Political parties had been allowed to organize for the first time since 1937, and there was rising opposition to Vargas, in spite of the constraints still placed by the regime on freedom of expression. However, the political atmosphere was one of suspicion and insecurity, given Vargas's authoritarian record. There were fears that the elections could be cancelled, or that they would be manipulated by Vargas. In those circumstances, a group of Vargas's own generals, led by the Minister of War, General Pedro Aurélio de Góis Monteiro, turned against the dictator and deposed him from office in a sudden palace coup on 29 October 1945. The military then handed over power to the president of the Supreme Court, and safeguarded the freedom of the December 1945 elections, in which all parties were allowed to take part, from Communists to right-wing landowners; from Vargas's staunch opponents to his most loyal defenders. The deposed dictator himself (who still mustered strong popular support on account of the many social reforms implemented during his government, that created the Brazilian welfare state) was elected a Senator by the State of Rio Grande do Sul. He would go on to be elected president in 1950.)	14 years, 360 days	None	Vacant (Note: The office of vice president was abolished during Vargas's tenure, as neither the 1934 Constitution nor the 1937 Constitution provided for a vice president.)
15		José Linhares (1886–1957); Acting President (Note: José Linhares, President of the Supreme Court, took office as President of the Republic after he was summoned by the Minister of War, General Góis Monteiro, in the wake of the overthrow of President Getúlio Vargas. At the time of the dictator's toppling, the president of the Supreme Court was the first and only person in the presidential line of succession, given that the other officers in that line, who would have outranked him, had never been elected, so that Linhares was Vargas's legal deputy. The Linhares administration was a transitional government, that established the rules and procedures for the termination of the Estado Novo regime and the restoration of democratic institutions in Brazil. The parliamentary and presidential elections scheduled for 2 December 1945 were maintained, but on 12 November 1945 Linhares issued a statute establishing that the parliament to be elected would be a fully fledged Constituent Assembly, charged with adopting a new, democratic constitution to replace the one that had been imposed by Vargas in 1937 and create a new political system in its place. Once elections were held and the elected president took office on 31 January 1946, José Linhares returned to his position as President of the Supreme Court.)	—	29 October 1945	31 January 1946	94 days	None	Vacant

== Fourth Republic (1946–1964) ==
The Fourth Brazilian Republic, or the Populist Republic, began after Vargas was deposed by a military coup in 1945. Nevertheless, Vargas would be elected president once again in 1950 until his later suicide on 24 August 1954, with his influence in Brazilian politics remaining until the end of the Fourth Republic.

No.	Portrait	President (Birth–Death)	Elected	Term of office			Political party	Vice president
No.	Portrait	President (Birth–Death)	Elected	Took office	Left office	Time in office	Political party	Vice president
16		Gaspar Dutra (1883–1974)	1945	31 January 1946	31 January 1951	5 years	PSD	Vacant
16		Gaspar Dutra (1883–1974)	1945	31 January 1946	31 January 1951	5 years	PSD	Nereu Ramos (Note: In accordance with the rules decreed during the Linhares's administration to govern the transition to democracy, the 1945 elections were held to choose a president and the members of the Constituent Assembly (made up of Senators and Deputies) only. The office of vice president had been abolished since 1934, and so no vice president was chosen. However, the Constituent Assembly decided to recreate the office of vice president. The Constitution adopted on 18 September 1946 specified that the first vice president would be elected by the Constituent Assembly itself on the day following the promulgation of the Constitution, and would take office on the same date, to serve until the inauguration of the president and vice president that would take office in 1951. Under those transitional provisions, Nereu Ramos was elected and inaugurated as vice president on 19 September 1946.) (PSD)
17		Getúlio Vargas (1882–1954)	1950	31 January 1951	24 August 1954 (Note: Vargas committed suicide on 24 August 1954. The political climate at the time of President Vargas's suicide was one of turmoil and instability. Vargas was a former dictator, who had been democratically elected President of Brazil in 1950 by direct popular ballot under the 1946 Constitution. In 1953, a Parliamentary Commission of Inquiry accused the government of illegally aiding newspaper owner Samuel Wainer to obtain loans from the state-owned bank Banco do Brasil in exchange for political support by his Última Hora newspaper. This accusation resulted in an impeachment petition against Vargas that reached the floor of the Chamber of Deputies, but the impeachment attempt failed, and the charges were accordingly never presented to the Senate, because the Chamber of Deputies rejected the impeachment petition in June 1954. The political atmosphere, however, remained very tense. Shortly afterwards, a criminal attempt against the life of leading opposition politician Carlos Lacerda on 5 August 1954 (an episode in Rio de Janeiro known as the Tonelero Street shooting), that resulted in the death of his bodyguard, Air Force Major Rubens Vaz, led to accusations by the Opposition that the criminal act had been orchestrated by Vargas himself or by his aides, and in late August 1954 it was widely expected that a section of the military would soon intervene in politics once again, to depose President Vargas due to that incident. Indeed, investigations conducted by the Air Force Police found that Gregório Fortunato, a member of President Vargas's bodyguard, had orchestrated the criminal act against Carlos Lacerda that resulted in the death of Major Rubens Vaz. A military inquiry on the death of Major Rubens Vaz, conducted at Rio's Galeão Air Force Base, also uncovered evidence of corruption involving both Fortunato and Manuel Vargas, the President's son. Although some claimed that the President's supporters had acted alone, without his knowledge, opponents of the President claimed that he had ordered Lacerda's assassination and that he was the mastermind behind the shooting. Those circumstances resulted in agitation in the military against the President, and, on the eve of his suicide, troops were already on the move to depose him, without the constitutional impeachment process, in what, therefore, would have been a military coup d'état. Having perceived that he had little support in the military to avoid a coup, and that his overthrow was imminent, Vargas, in a depressed state, committed suicide. He had presided over an emergency cabinet meeting in the early hours of 24 August 1954, and then retired to his bedroom and, a few hours later, shot himself in the chest, leaving behind a suicide note and a political testament. An ambulance was called to the Palace, but when it arrived Vargas was already dead. After his death, the military mobilization for a coup ceased, and there was an outpouring of popular feeling for the deceased president. In 1956, Fortunato was found guilty of the Tonelero Street crime, and sentenced to 25 years in prison. He was murdered by a fellow prison inmate in 1962. The involvement of President Vargas in the criminal act is still debated by historians.)	3 years, 205 days	PTB	Café Filho (PSP)
18		Café Filho (1899–1970)	—	24 August 1954 (Note: Upon the suicide of President Getúlio Vargas on 24 August 1954, Vice President Café Filho immediately assumed the powers and duties of the presidency as acting president, but the joint session of Congress required by the Federal Constitution for his swearing-in as president was only held on 3 September 1954, after the burial of the deceased president and a period of mourning. Accordingly, from 24 August 1954 until 3 September 1954, Café Filho was Acting President of the Republic, and on 3 September 1954 he took the constitutional oath in the presence of Congress and became President.)	8 November 1955 (Note: On 8 November 1955, President Café Filho declared himself temporarily unable to govern for medical reasons. The President had gone to hospital on 3 November 1955, suffering from a heart condition. His self-declared incapacity led to the assumption of the powers of the presidency by Carlos Luz (who was President of the Chamber of Deputies) as acting president. The President of the Chamber of Deputies was the constitutional successor of the President of the Republic, because the vice presidency was then vacant. However, Acting President Carlos Luz was seen as hostile to the inauguration of the then-president-elect, Juscelino Kubitschek. Indeed, the results of the election were contested by the National Democratic Union (UDN), the party that had the second greatest share of the vote in the 1955 presidential election, and there was talk of a conspiracy to block the inauguration of the president-elect. Therefore, fearing that Carlos Luz would lead a coup to prevent the inauguration of the president-elect, a section of the military, led by the Army Minister himself (Marshal Henrique Teixeira Lott), in what they called a preventive counter-coup, deposed Carlos Luz from the post of acting president on 11 November and installed Senator Nereu Ramos, the Vice President of the Senate, as Acting President of the Republic in his stead. Faced with the actions of the military, both houses of Congress summarily voted, also on 11 November 1955, to back Marshal Lott's preventive counter coup, by recognizing an emergency, declaring Luz impeded from acting as president, and confirming Nereu Ramos as acting president. Carlos Luz attempted to resist his toppling, by boarding the Navy ship Tamandaré in the company of leading UDN politicians, and heading to the port of Santos, in the hope of receiving the support of Jânio Quadros, the Governor of São Paulo State, and of the military stationed in that state. However, the Tamandaré received news from São Paulo that such support would not be forthcoming, and Luz therefore ordered the ship to sail back to Rio de Janeiro, where he surrendered on 13 November. Also on 13 November 1955, Acting President Nereu Ramos visited President Café Filho in hospital, and assured him that he would only continue serving as acting president until the President recovered. However, Marshal Lott and the other leaders of the 11 of November movement decided to block the resumption of the powers of the presidency by Café Filho, because they suspected that the President, too, was involved in the conspiracy to prevent the inauguration of the president-elect. Upon being released from hospital, on 21 November, Café Filho sent a message to the Acting President and to both Houses of Congress informing them that he had recovered from his illness, and therefore was resuming the powers and duties of the presidency of the Republic. His resumption of those powers and duties, however, was swiftly blocked by the military: army tanks surrounded the Catete Palace (the seat of the presidency), to prevent Café Filho from reaching the Presidential Palace, where Nereu Ramos remained. Several other points in the capital were also surrounded by military forces. Café Filho therefore returned to his private residence, that was soon also surrounded by tanks, and the President was prevented from leaving his home. Given that situation, both houses of Congress summarily voted, on 21 and 22 November 1955, to declare that the President's impediment persisted, that he therefore could not resume the powers and duties of the presidency until the Congress resolved otherwise, and that acorrdingly, Senator Nereu Ramos should continue as acting president, as per the congressional resolutions of 11 November. Because this "solution" was employed, of the Houses of Congress declaring, on 21 and 22 November, that they considered that Café Filho could not for the time being resume the powers and duties of the office, he was never formally removed from the office, and there was no impeachment process. Had there been an impeachment process, it would have required a formal accusation against the President, and he would have had the chance to defend himself and to stand trial before the Senate. However, impeachment proceedings were never initiated against Café Filho, and instead he was simply prevented from resuming his powers and duties on the basis of the congressional resolutions of 21 and 22 November 1955. Although for all practical purposes Café Filho had effectively been deposed, and it was universally understood that he would never be allowed to resume the powers of the presidency, neither Congress nor the military went as far as declaring the presidential office vacant, and therefore, formally, Café Filho was not overthrown, but simply barred from resuming the powers of the presidency. While technically Café Filho was never removed from office, he was thus prevented from resuming the powers and duties of the presidency until the end of his term and the inauguration of Kubitschek on 31 January 1956, and Nereu Ramos continued serving as acting president until then. Café Filho's lawyers presented two petitions on his behalf to the Supreme Court also on 22 November 1955: one of habeas corpus, to restore his freedom of movement, and one of writ of mandamus, seeking an injunction from the Court to allow the President to resume his powers and duties. A statute was passed by Congress and signed into law by Acting President Ramos on 25 November declaring a state of siege (a form of martial law prescribed by the emergency provisions of the Constitution, that were then put in operation). On 14 December 1955, the Supreme Federal Court decided not to interfere in the political question, by ruling, regarding the writ of mandamus petition, that it could not decide the case while the state of siege declared by law persisted. As for the habeas corpus petition, it was declared moot on 21 December 1955, after Acting President Ramos informed the Court that Café Filho's freedom of movement had been restored, without prejudice to the continuation of his impediment. Only on 7 November 1956, long after Café Filho's term had ended, the Court would resume its deliberation on the writ of mandamus, to dispose of the case and close it, by recognizing that the petition had now been rendered moot, due to the termination of Café Filho's term in office.)	1 year, 76 days	PSP	Vacant
19		Carlos Luz (1894–1961); Acting President	—	8 November 1955	11 November 1955	3 days	PSD	Vacant
20		Nereu Ramos (1888–1958); Acting President (Note: Nereu Ramos was the Vice President of the Federal Senate (the office of President of the Senate, then vested in the vice presidency of the Republic, was vacant, and thus Ramos, as Vice President of the Senate, acted as the Senate's presiding officer pro tempore). Summoned by the Minister of the Army, Henrique Teixeira Lott, who led the coup to overthrow Acting President Carlos Luz, Senator Nereu Ramos assumed the powers of the presidency of the Republic after Luz's deposition, on 11 November 1955 (as detailed above). After President Café Filho was impeded from resuming the powers and duties of the office on 21 and 22 November 1955, Ramos continued serving as acting president until the end of the presidential term and the inauguration of President-elect Kubitschek. Although technically Carlos Luz and Nereu Ramos were only acting presidents, due to the critical circumstances surrounding their administrations, they are usually included in the lists of presidents of Brazil, and are even included in the official gallery of presidents published by the presidency of Brazil. Furthermore, Nereu Ramos had an official photograph of himself as president made, and he made use of the presidential sash, the insignia reserved for the President of the Republic alone. As for the actions of the military and of Congress that deposed acting president Calos Luz, prevented President Café Filho from resuming the discharge of the powers of the presidency, installed and maintained Senator Nereu Ramos as acting president until the inauguration of President-elect Kubitschek, those actions were in clear violation of the Constitution, although the backing of Congress helped to increase the appearance of legitimacy to the acts of the military. In spite of being unconstitutional, most historians today agree that those actions, led by Marshal Henrique Lott, had indeed the aim of securing the transfer of power according to the result of the 1955 presidential election; that there was indeed a conspiracy to prevent the inauguration of Kubitschek; and that the democratic result of the 1955 elections would not have been respected if not for the actions of Lott's preventive counter coup.)	—	11 November 1955	31 January 1956	81 days	PSD	Vacant
21		Juscelino Kubitschek (1902–1976)	1955	31 January 1956	31 January 1961	5 years	PSD	João Goulart (PTB)
22		Jânio Quadros (1917–1992)	1960	31 January 1961	25 August 1961 (Note: President Jânio Quadros resigned from office on 25 August 1961. There were no political reasons for President Quadros's sudden and abrupt resignation, that took the country and the political establishment by surprise. Some aides and close advisors of the former president have postulated that Quadros was heavily drunk when he wrote and ordered the delivery to Congress of his letter of resignation. Others suggest that Quadros imagined that Congress would not want his vice president, João Goulart, as president, and that the legislature would therefore ask him to reconsider his resignation, and would agree to grant him extraordinary powers. Several historians postulate that both things may be true: Quadros was drunk, and in that state he imagined that his resignation would not be accepted and would result in him being able to bargain for extraordinary powers. However, the Brazilian Constitution did not require that the President's resignation be accepted by Congress or by any authority; instead, the resignation was deemed to be a unilateral act, that became effective as soon as Congress received the President's written instrument of resignation. Accordingly, once the President of Congress received the Quadros's letter of resignation, a joint session of Congress was convened, the resignation letter was simply read and entered into the records of Congress, and the resignation was deemed effective, and as a result the President of Congress immediately proceeded to declare that Quadros had vacated the presidency. Afterwards, when asked why he had resigned from office, Quadros denied both the claims of authoritarian intentions and the accounts that he was drunk, but simply stated that he had done it because he wanted to, giving no further reasons for his action. His resignation letter mentioned that he felt he had been "crushed" by unspecified "terrible forces" organized against him.)	206 days	PTN	João Goulart (PTB)
23		Ranieri Mazzilli (1910–1975); Acting President (Note: Mazzilli, President of the Chamber of Deputies and second in line in the presidential order of succession, became Acting President of the Republic upon President Quadros's resignation, because the Vice President of the Republic, João Goulart, was then out of the country, on an official visit to China. Due to a serious political crisis (see below for further details), Vice President Goulart only took office as president on 7 September 1961, and Mazzilli remained as acting president until then.)	—	25 August 1961	7 September 1961	13 days	PSD	Vacant
24		João Goulart (1918–1976)	—	7 September 1961 (Note: Goulart was on an official visit to China when Quadros resigned the presidency. While the Vice President was still abroad, there was an attempt on the part of the Vice President's opponents, who controlled Congress, to prevent him from being inaugurated, but that movement failed, due to resistance by the governor of the State Rio Grande do Sul and a split in the military. However, Congress only allowed the inauguration of Goulart to proceed after a compromise was reached, whereby a constitutional amendment severely limiting the powers of the presidency was passed on 2 September 1961. Under that constitutional amendment, the presidential executive, that had existed since the proclamation of the Republic, was abolished and replaced with a parliamentary system, in which a Prime Minister was the head of government and the President of the Republic retained only the role of head of state. The amendment however stipulated that the constitutional change would only become permanent if confirmed by the people in a referendum. On 6 January 1963, that referendum was held, and a majority of the voters rejected the amendment, backing the restoration of the presidential executive instead. According to the result of the referendum, on 23 January 1963 a new constitutional amendment was promulgated, repealing the 1961 amendment and re-establishing the presidential executive as it existed immediately prior to that amendment. Thus, from 7 September 1961 until 23 January 1963, President Goulart served as head of state only, in a parliamentary system of government, and, from 23 January 1963 onwards, he served as both head of state and head of government.)	2 April 1964 (Note: Goulart was deposed by the military coup of 1964, that marked the beginning of the 1964–1985 military regime.)	2 years, 208 days	PTB	Vacant

== Military Rule (1964–1985) ==
The Fourth Republic would end after a military coup in 1964. This coup brought to power in Brazil a military regime that was politically aligned with the interests of the US government.

No.	Portrait	President (Birth–Death)	Elected	Term of office			Political party	Vice president
No.	Portrait	President (Birth–Death)	Elected	Took office	Left office	Time in office	Political party	Vice president
25		Ranieri Mazzilli (1910–1975); Acting President (Note: Following the 1964 military coup, the President of Congress, Senator Auro de Moura Andrade convened a joint session of Congress on 2 April 1964 and summarily announced that President João Goulart was deposed and that the presidency was vacant. Moura Andrade then declared Ranieri Mazzilli (who then was the President of the Chamber of Deputies and the first person in the presidential line of succession) to have become President of the Republic. Accordingly, Mazzilli took charge of the presidency, but, in spite of Moura Andrade's bold statement declaring Mazzilli President, Mazzilli only took office as acting president: he never took the presidential oath, and, during his brief term in office, he issued his acts as "The President of the Chamber of Deputies, acting in the office of President of the Republic". The 1946 Constitution, then in force, authorized the vice president to succeed to the presidency if the office of president became vacant, but it only authorized the President of the Chamber of Deputies and the other officers in the line of succession to serve as acting president, and, in the case of a double vacancy of the pesidency and of the vice presidency, it required new presidential elections to be summoned (direct elections by popular ballot if the second vacancy took place in the first half of the presidential term; indirect elections by Congress if the second vacancy occurred in the second half of the presidential term). Mindful of the fact that the elected president for the 1961–1966 term was Quadros (who had resigned), succeeded as president by Goulart, his vice president (who was deposed by the 1964 military coup), and that he was only the President of the Chamber of Deputies, Mazzilli limited his actions to that of a caretaker acting president, pending the holding of elections. The norms that would have governed those elections, however, were altered by continuing acts of interference from the Armed Forces that had ejected Goulart from office: on 9 April 1964, a body known as the Supreme Command of the Revolution, composed of the leaders of the military coup (the commanders of the three branches of the Armed Forces), issued an institutional act summoning the National Congress to elect a new president in 48 hours. The military then put forward the name of Marshal Castelo Branco, and he was elected by Congress as planned. Ranieri Mazzilli, therefore, remained as acting president only for two weeks, until the inauguration of Castelo Branco on 15 April 1964.)	—	2 April 1964	15 April 1964	13 days	PSD	Vacant
26		Castelo Branco (1897–1967)	1964	15 April 1964	15 March 1967	2 years, 334 days	None (military) (Note: Until 4 April 1966, date of creation of the National Renewal Alliance.) ARENA (military)	José Maria Alkmin (PSD · ARENA) (Note: Alkmin was a PSD member; when the PSD was abolished in 1965, he joined ARENA.)
27		Costa e Silva (1899–1969)	1966	15 March 1967	31 August 1969 (Note: A military junta composed of the ministers in charge of the three branches of the Armed Forces assumed the powers of the presidency on 31 August 1969, after President Costa e Silva suffered a cerebral thrombosis that left him completely incapacitated. The military junta seized power so as to prevent Vice President Pedro Aleixo, a civilian, from becoming acting president. The possibility of a civilian, even a conservative one, assuming the powers of the presidency was seen as detrimental to the continuity of the military regime. In the initial stage of the President's disease, the junta hoped that he would recover. Subsequently, realizing that the President's condition was irreversible, and that the prolonged continuity of a triumvirate was detrimental to the regime and to its image, the military junta issued an institutional act on 14 October 1969, removing the incapacitated President and the Vice President from office and summoning Congress to elect a new president and vice president. The military elite that controlled the regime then selected General Emílio Médici to be ARENA's candidate, and his name was rubber-stamped by Congress. The junta remained in place until the new President was sworn in. In 2011, Brazil enacted a federal law recognizing the illegality of the acts that prevented Vice President Pedro Aleixo from becoming acting president and that removed him from office; the statute also directs that Pedro Aleixo be deemed a former president of the Republic. Costa e Silva died less than three months after his removal, and, were it not for the military acts now declared illegal that removed him from the vice presidency, Pedro Aleixo would have succeeded to the presidency.)	2 years, 169 days	ARENA (military)	Pedro Aleixo (ARENA)
—		Pedro Aleixo (1901–1975)	—	Never took office (Note: Brazilian Federal Law number 12.486, promulgated on 12 September 2011, posthumously recognizes the illegality of the acts (see above) that prevented Vice President Pedro Aleixo from becoming acting president and that removed him from office, and directs that he be deemed and taken as a former president of the Republic for all legal purposes.)			ARENA	Vacant
—		Aurélio de Lira Tavares	—	31 August 1969	30 October 1969	60 days	None (1969 junta)	Vacant
—		Augusto Rademaker	—	31 August 1969	30 October 1969	60 days	None (1969 junta)	Vacant
—		Márcio de Sousa e Melo	—	31 August 1969	30 October 1969	60 days	None (1969 junta)	Vacant
28		Emílio Médici (1905–1985)	1969	30 October 1969	15 March 1974	4 years, 136 days	ARENA (military)	Augusto Rademaker (ARENA · military)
29		Ernesto Geisel (1907–1996)	1974	15 March 1974	15 March 1979	5 years	ARENA (military)	Adalberto Pereira (ARENA · military)
30		João Figueiredo (1918–1999)	1978	15 March 1979	15 March 1985	6 years	ARENA (Note: Until 20 December 1979, date of dissolution of the National Renewal Alliance.) PDS (Note: From 31 January 1980, date of creation of the Democratic Social Party.)	Aureliano Chaves (ARENA · PDS · PFL)

== Sixth Republic (1985–present) ==
The military dictatorship lasted 21 years, until 1985, when Neves was indirectly elected Brazil's first civilian president since the 1960 elections. Known also as the Sixth Brazilian Republic, or the New Republic, this is the contemporary epoch in the history of Brazil.

No.	Portrait	President (Birth–Death)	Elected	Term of office			Political party	Vice president
No.	Portrait	President (Birth–Death)	Elected	Took office	Left office	Time in office	Political party	Vice president
—		Tancredo Neves (1910–1985)	1985	Never took office (Note: Tancredo Neves died before taking office, but more than one month after the start of his presidential term. The Constitution required the president and vice president to be invested in their offices by taking the oath of office in the presence of a joint session of Congress. President-elect Tancredo Neves, suffering from the consequences of a tumor that was then misdiagnosed as acute diverticulitis, became gravely ill on 14 March 1985, on the eve of his inauguration, so that he could not attend the inaugural ceremony in Congress, because his doctors concluded that he required emergency surgery. José Sarney, his running mate, accordingly appeared before Congress alone on the day of Neves's would-be inauguration, took office as vice president, and served as acting president from start of the new presidential term, on 15 March 1985, until the day the President-elect died. Initially, there was hope that the President-elect would recover and take office, but he developed several complications and infections, and underwent several other operations, ultimately resulting in his death. Upon Neves's death on 21 April 1985, Acting President Sarney succeeded to the presidency. On the first anniversary of Neves's death, a statute was signed into law (federal law 7.465/1986), establishing that Tancredo Neves "elected but not sworn-in due to his death" should be included in the gallery of the presidents of Brazil "for all legal purposes".)			PMDB	José Sarney (PMDB)
31		José Sarney (b. 1930)	—	15 March 1985	15 March 1990	5 years	PMDB	Vacant
32		Fernando Collor (b. 1949)	1989	15 March 1990	29 December 1992 (Note: President Collor was impeached on corruption charges. On 29 September 1992, the Chamber of Deputies voted, by the required two-thirds majority of its members, to allow the charges against the President to be presented to the Senate. On 1 October 1992, the Senate voted to receive the charges and proceed with the trial. On 2 October 1992, upon receiving the formal writ of summons notifying him that he was now a defendant in the impeachment trial that the Senate would conduct, President Collor was automatically suspended from office for 180 days as provided in the Constitution of Brazil, and Vice President Itamar Franco became acting president. On 29 December 1992, on the final day of his trial of impeachment before the Federal Senate, President Collor resigned the presidency, in an attempt to stop the process. The Senate's session as acourt of impeachment was suspended, and two successive joint sessions of Congress were held, one shortly after the other: in the first joint session, President Collor's resignation letter was formally read before Congress by its First Secretary and entered into the congressional record, and the presidential resignation thereby took legal effect, resulting in the formal declaration by the President of Congress to the assembled joint session, that the presidency of the Republic was vacant, and that, as a result of that vacancy, Acting President Franco would be summoned at once, as Collor's legal successor, to take the constitutional oath and assume the presidency; in the second joint session of Congress, Acting President Itamar Franco was accordingly sworn in as president, as required by the Constitution. Later in the same day, the Senate resumed its sitting as a court of impeachment and decided that the President's resignation after the start of the trial could not stop the process, given that the determination of the former president's guilt or innocence was relevant for the purposes of imposing on him the penalty of disqualification from holding public office for eight years. Accordingly, the trial of impeachment continued in spite of Collor's resignation and, in the early hours of 30 December 1992, he was found guilty of the charges, by the required majority of more than two thirds of the members of the Senate. The penalty of removal from office was declared moot as Collor had already resigned, but as a result of his conviction by the Senate, he was disqualified for holding public office for eight years. The Senate's sentence in the trial of impeachment, imposing upon Collor the said penalty, was pronounced on 30 December 1992 and published in the Official Journal on 31 December 1992. Accordingly, Collor remained disqualified from holding public office until 31 December 2000.)	2 years, 289 days	PRN	Itamar Franco (PRN · PMDB) (Note: Itamar Franco joined the PRN for the 1989 election to run as Collor's running mate. In office, he broke with Collor, and left the PRN on 5 May 1992, returning to the PMDB.)
33		Itamar Franco (1930–2011)	—	29 December 1992	1 January 1995	2 years, 3 days	PMDB	Vacant
34		Fernando Henrique Cardoso (b. 1931)	1994 1998	1 January 1995	1 January 2003	8 years	PSDB	Marco Maciel (PFL)
35		Luiz Inácio Lula da Silva (b. 1945)	2002 2006	1 January 2003	1 January 2011	8 years	PT	José Alencar (PL · PRB)
36		Dilma Rousseff (b. 1947)	2010 2014	1 January 2011	31 August 2016 (Note: On 2 December 2015, the President of the Chamber of Deputies decided to accept, for the consideration of that assembly, a petition presenting charges of impeachment against President Dilma Rousseff, on the grounds of having violated the 2015 budgetary law and fiscal responsibility norms. On 17 April 2016, the Chamber of Deputies voted, by the required two-thirds majority of its members, to allow the charges against the President to be presented to the Senate. On 12 May 2016, the Senate voted to receive the charges and proceed with the trial. On the same date, upon receiving the formal writ of summons notifying her that she was now a defendant in the impeachment trial that the Senate would conduct, President Rousseff's powers and duties were suspended for 180 days as provided in the Constitution of Brazil, and Vice President Michel Temer became acting president. On 31 August 2016, the Senate, sitting as a judicial body, voted, by the required two-thirds majority of its members, to convict the President and to remove her from office. The penalty of disqualification from holding public office for eight years was not imposed on the former president, because the majority of two-thirds of the members of the Senate was not reached in the specific vote on that penalty. As a result of the vacancy of the presidency, Acting President Michel Temer succeeded to the office, being sworn in as president before a joint session of Congress, also on 31 August 2016.)	5 years, 243 days	PT	Michel Temer (PMDB)
37		Michel Temer (b. 1940)	—	31 August 2016	1 January 2019	2 years, 123 days	MDB (Note: When Michel Temer became president, his party was still named Brazilian Democratic Movement Party (PMDB). During his tenure in office, on 19 December 2017, the party's National Convention altered the party's Articles of Incorporation, changing its name back to Brazilian Democratic Movement (MDB), the same name that the party had borne from 1965 to 1981.)	Vacant
38		Jair Bolsonaro (b. 1955)	2018	1 January 2019	1 January 2023	4 years	PSL (Note: Until 19 November 2019.) Independent PL (Note: From 30 November 2021.)	Hamilton Mourão (PRTB · Republicanos)
39		Luiz Inácio Lula da Silva (b. 1945)	2022 2026	1 January 2023	Incumbent	3 years, 325 days	PT (FE Brasil)	Geraldo Alckmin (PSB)

== See also ==
- History of Brazil
- History of Portugal
- List of presidents of Brazil
- List of Brazilian consorts
- List of Portuguese monarchs
- First ladies and gentlemen of Brazil
- List of presidents of Brazil by time in office
- List of monarchs of Brazil
- List of Brazilian regents
