= List of presidents of Brazil =

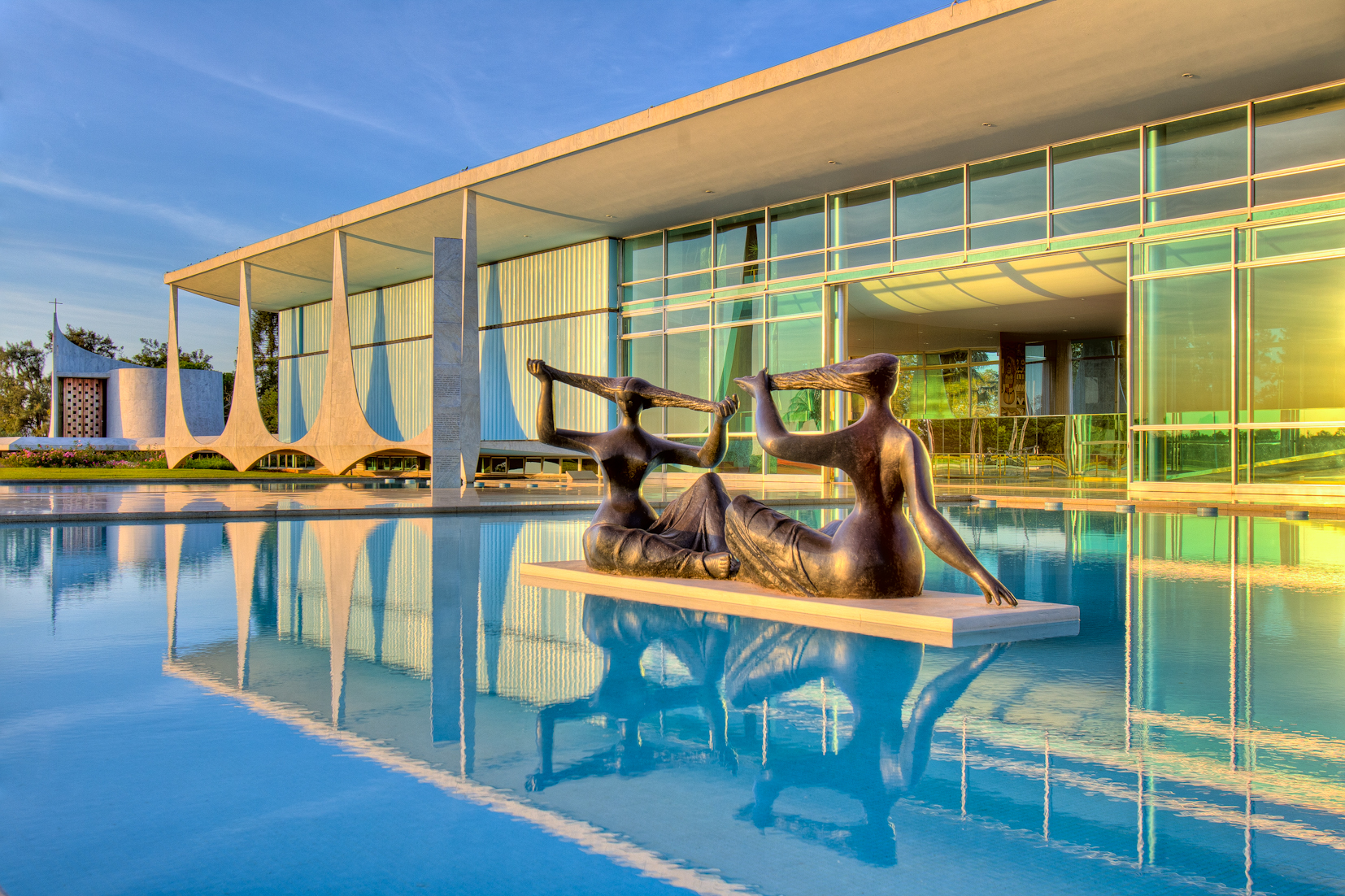
Palácio da Alvorada, the official residence of the presidents of Brazil, pictured on 21 June 2011

This article lists the presidents of Brazil. The president of the Federative Republic of Brazil is the chief executive of the federal government of Brazil and the commander-in-chief of the Brazilian Armed Forces.

== Pre-Republican Brazil (1815–1889) ==
Brazil had two monarchs during the time of the Kingdom of Brazil, a constituent kingdom under the United Kingdom of Portugal, Brazil and the Algarves: Maria I (1815–1816) and John VI (1816–1822). When this kingdom was created, Queen Maria I was already considered incapable due to mental illness, and the Portuguese Empire was ruled by Prince John, later King John VI, as regent. As the independent Empire of Brazil, Brazil had two monarchs, Emperors Pedro I (1822–1831) and Pedro II (1831–1889). The second woman to rule Brazil after Maria I was Empress Leopoldina of Austria, who acted as regent in 1822 and had a great influence on Brazil's independence, having been responsible for signing the decree that separated Brazil from Portugal, creating the independent Empire of Brazil.

Having proclaimed the independence of the Empire of Brazil from Portugal in 1822, Prince Pedro, son of King John VI, was acclaimed the first Emperor of Brazil on 12 October 1822. After abdicating the throne on 7 April 1831, he was succeeded by his son, Prince Pedro de Alcântara, who reigned as Pedro II of Brazil. The third woman to rule Brazil was Princess Isabel, heir presumptive to the throne, who acted as regent of Brazil in various periods (1870–1871, 1876–1877, and 1887–1888) while her father, Emperor Pedro II, performed foreign visits. During her last regency, she sanctioned the Golden Law (Imperial Law No. 3,353 of 13 May 1888), which abolished slavery in Brazil. Emperor Pedro II was deposed on 15 November 1889 in a bloodless military coup d'état, ending the 74-year-old monarchy.

== First Republic (1889–1930) ==
In 1889, the Empire of Brazil was abolished and replaced with a republic in a bloodless coup d'état led by Marshal Deodoro da Fonseca, who deposed Emperor Pedro II, proclaimed Brazil a republic, and formed a provisional government. The 15 November 1889 military coup began as an attempt to overthrow the Empire's prime minister, Afonso Celso, Viscount of Ouro Preto, but the unprecedented coup against a prime minister appointed by the Emperor, and who enjoyed the confidence of the elected Chamber of Deputies, quickly escalated into the abolition of the Brazilian monarchy.

With the proclamation of the Brazilian Republic, the Imperial Constitution ceased to operate, the Imperial Parliament (the General Assembly) ceased to exist, and not only was the Viscount of Ouro Preto removed from office, but the position of prime minister itself ceased to exist. As Head of the Provisional Government, Deodoro da Fonseca ruled by decree, holding both the functions of head of state and head of government. The former imperial provinces were reorganized as states and the newly proclaimed republic was declared a federation, formed by the union of those states.

In 1890, elections for a Constituent Congress were summoned and held, but the decree of the provisional government which created the Congress required it to adopt a constitution that conformed to the recently proclaimed republican system of government, and that organized the recently declared federal state. In 1891, a new Brazilian Constitution was adopted, based on the Constitution of the United States of America. The country itself was named the United States of Brazil. In accordance with the provisions of the Constitution, the Presidents of the Republic were to be elected by direct popular vote, but, for the first presidential term, both the president and vice president would be elected by the Constituent Congress; the Constituent Congress was to elect the first president and vice president immediately after the promulgation of the Constitution.

In accordance with those transitional provisions of the Constitution, Congress elected the then-Head of the Provisional Government, Deodoro da Fonseca, as the first President of Brazil. Marshal Floriano Peixoto was elected by Congress as the first vice president. The inauguration of the first president and of the first vice president was held on 26 February 1891, just two days after the promulgation of the new Constitution. Deodoro soon resigned from the presidency ten months later, after a coup d'état in which he dissolved Congress was reversed. Floriano Peixoto was then inaugurated as president. In 1894, Peixoto was succeeded by Prudente de Morais, the first President of Brazil to be elected by direct popular ballot. Morais, who was the first president to be elected under the permanent provisions of the Constitution adopted in 1891, was also the first civilian to assume the presidency of Brazil.

Although it was theoretically a constitutional democracy, the First Republic was characterized by the power of regional oligarchies and the seldom broken alternation of power in the federal sphere between the states of São Paulo and Minas Gerais. The vote in the countryside was often controlled by local land owners, as less than 6% of the population had the right to vote due to literacy requirements.

In 1930, when Brazil was suffering the effects of the Wall Street crash of 1929, a revolution broke out in the country, ending the First Republic. Washington Luís, who was supported by the São Paulo oligarchies, broke the expected alternation between São Paulo and Minas Gerais by supporting another candidate from São Paulo, Júlio Prestes. Prestes won the 1930 election, but Washington Luís was deposed three weeks before the end of his term, and Prestes was never inaugurated.

Political parties

Unaffiliated
Federal Republican Party
Paulista Republican Party
Mineiro Republican Party
Fluminense Republican Party
Conservative Republican Party

No.	Portrait	President (Birth–Death)	Elected (Note: Years in italics denote indirect elections.)	Term of office			Political party (Note: Reflects the president's political party at the start of their presidency. Changes during their time in office are noted.)	Vice president	R.
No.	Portrait	President (Birth–Death)	Elected	Took office	Left office	Time in office	Political party	Vice president	R.
1	Presidential portrait of Deodoro da Fonseca	Deodoro da Fonseca (1827–1892)	1891 (Note: Provisional head of government from 15 November 1889 to 25 February 1891. Sworn in as President of the Republic on 26 February, following the promulgation of the Constitution of 1891 on the 24th and the holding of an indirect election on the 25th.)	15 November 1889	23 November 1891 (Note: Resigned from office.)	2 years, 8 days	Unaffiliated	Vacant until 26 February 1891 Floriano Peixoto	
2	Presidential portrait of Floriano Peixoto	Floriano Peixoto (1839–1895)	—	23 November 1891	15 November 1894	2 years, 357 days	Unaffiliated	Vacant throughout presidency	
3	Presidential portrait of Prudente de Morais	Prudente de Morais (1841–1902)	1894	15 November 1894	15 November 1898	4 years	PR Federal	Manuel Vitorino	
4	Presidential portrait of Campos Sales	Campos Sales (1841–1913)	1898	15 November 1898	15 November 1902	4 years	PRP	Rosa e Silva	
5	Presidential portrait of Rodrigues Alves	Rodrigues Alves (1848–1919)	1902	15 November 1902	15 November 1906	4 years	PRP	Afonso Pena (Note: Appointed as vice president to succeed vice president-elect Silviano Brandão, who had died before taking office.)	
6	Presidential portrait of Afonso Pena	Afonso Pena (1847–1909)	1906	15 November 1906	14 June 1909 (Note: Died in office.)	2 years, 211 days	PRM	Nilo Peçanha	
7	Presidential portrait of Nilo Peçanha	Nilo Peçanha (1867–1924)	—	14 June 1909 (Note: Nilo Peçanha succeeded to the presidency upon the death of Afonso Pena.)	15 November 1910	1 year, 154 days	PRF	Vacant throughout presidency	
8	Presidential portrait of Hermes da Fonseca	Hermes da Fonseca (1855–1923)	1910	15 November 1910	15 November 1914	4 years	PRC	Venceslau Brás	
9	Presidential portrait of Venceslau Brás	Venceslau Brás (1868–1966)	1914	15 November 1914	15 November 1918	4 years	PRM	Urbano Santos	
—	Presidential portrait of Rodrigues Alves	Rodrigues Alves (1848–1919)	1918	Never took office (Note: Rodrigues Alves fell ill with the Spanish flu before his inauguration, and thus was unable to attend it. His running mate, Delfim Moreira, took office as vice president and immediately became acting president. Rodrigues Alves ultimately never took the oath of office as he died from his illness in January 1919, and thus Delfim Moreira succeeded to the presidency upon his death.)			PRP	Delfim Moreira	
10	Presidential portrait of Delfim Moreira	Delfim Moreira (1868–1920)	—	15 November 1918 (Note: Delfim Moreira was Rodrigues Alves's running mate in the 1918 elections. The winner, Rodrigues Alves, was prevented from taking office due to health issues and died before he had the possibility to do so. As the Constitution stipulated that a new presidential election had to be held if the president was removed before completing two years in office, Delfim held the presidency until a newly elected official could be sworn in.)	28 July 1919	255 days	PRM	Vacant throughout presidency	
11	Presidential portrait of Epitácio Pessoa	Epitácio Pessoa (1865–1942)	1919	28 July 1919	15 November 1922	3 years, 110 days	PRM	Delfim Moreira Bueno de Paiva (Note: Elected as vice president via an indirect election.)	
12	Presidential portrait of Artur Bernardes	Artur Bernardes (1875–1955)	1922	15 November 1922	15 November 1926	4 years	PRM	Estácio Coimbra	
13	Presidential portrait of Washington Luís	Washington Luís (1869–1957)	1926	15 November 1926	24 October 1930 (Note: Deposed by the Revolution of 1930.)	3 years, 343 days	PRP	Melo Viana	
—	Photograph of Júlio Prestes	Júlio Prestes (1882–1946)	1930	Never took office (Note: Impeded from taking office by the Revolution of 1930. Despite never occupying this position, he is included in the list of former presidents in the Library of the Presidency of the Republic, and is listed as President of Brazil in the National Archive.)			PRP	Vital Soares	

== Vargas Era (1930–1946) ==
The Vargas Era consisted of two distinct republics: the Second Republic (1930–1937) and Third Republic (1937–1946). Prior to 1929, Brazilian politics was controlled by an alliance between the two largest state economies; known as "coffee with milk politics", coffee growers in São Paulo combined with the dairy industry centred in Minas Gerais to create an oligarchy, with the presidency alternating between the two states. This practice was broken when the leaders of São Paulo and President Washington Luís nominated their fellow Paulista Júlio Prestes as their candidate for the presidential election in March 1930. In response, Minas Gerais, Rio Grande do Sul, and Paraíba formed the "Liberal Alliance", backing opposition candidate Getúlio Vargas.

When Prestes won the 1930 presidential election, the Liberal Alliance denounced his victory as fraudulent, while Vargas's running mate, João Pessoa, was assassinated in July. A revolution then began on 3 October 1930 and quickly spread throughout the country; by 10 October, both Rio Grande do Sul and Minas Gerais had announced their support. Washington Luís was deposed on 24 October, and the Brazilian military junta of 1930 took over; Vargas assumed leadership of the junta on 3 November 1930, marking the end of the First Brazilian Republic and beginning of the Vargas Era.

The 1932 Constitutionalist Revolution led to the adoption of a new Constitution in 1934. However, this constitution was annulled, and Vargas became a dictator in the name of law and order through the dictatorial 1937 Constitution. His rule occupied two periods of Brazilian history, the Second Brazilian Republic and the Third Brazilian Republic, better known as the Estado Novo. Vargas was later deposed by another military coup d'état in 1945, led by his ex-supporters.

=== Second Republic (1930–1937) ===
No.	Portrait	President (Birth–Death)	Elected	Term of office			Political party	Vice president	R.
No.	Portrait	President (Birth–Death)	Elected	Took office	Left office	Time in office	Political party	Vice president	R.
—	Photograph of the 1930 military junta	Military junta of 1930 (Note: Formed by General Augusto Tasso Fragoso, leader of the junta; General João de Deus Mena Barreto, and Admiral Isaías de Noronha.)	—	24 October 1930	3 November 1930 (Note: Transferred power to Getúlio Vargas.)	10 days	Unaffiliated	Vacant throughout leadership	
14	First presidential portrait of Getúlio Vargas	Getúlio Vargas (1882–1954)	1934 (Note: Head of the Provisional Government from 3 November 1930 to 20 July 1934. Sworn in as President of the Republic following the promulgation of the Constitution of 1934 and the holding of an indirect presidential election.)	3 November 1930	10 November 1937 (Note: Carried out a self-coup that established the Estado Novo dictatorship.)	7 years, 7 days	Unaffiliated	Vacant throughout presidency (Note: The constitutions of 1934 and 1937 abolished the office of vice president.)	

=== Estado Novo (1937–1946) ===
No.	Portrait	President (Birth–Death)	Elected	Term of office			Political party	Vice president	R.
No.	Portrait	President (Birth–Death)	Elected	Took office	Left office	Time in office	Political party	Vice president	R.
(14)	First presidential portrait of Getúlio Vargas	Getúlio Vargas (1882–1954)	—	10 November 1937	29 October 1945 (Note: Deposed by the 1945 coup d'état.)	7 years, 353 days (14 years, 360 days)	Unaffiliated	Vacant throughout presidency	
15	Photograph of José Linhares	José Linhares (1886–1957); Acting President	—	29 October 1945 (Note: Appointed as president by Pedro Aurélio de Góis Monteiro.)	31 January 1946	94 days	Unaffiliated	Vacant throughout presidency	

== Fourth Republic (1946–1964) ==
In 1945, Vargas was overthrown by a military coup d'état led by his ex-supporters, leading to the adoption of the new 1946 Constitution. Nevertheless, he would be elected president once again, and his influence in Brazilian politics would remain until the end of the Fourth Republic. In this period, three parties dominated the national politics. Two were pro-Vargas – in the left, the PTB and in the centre-right, the PSD – and another anti-Vargas, the rightist UDN.

This period was very unstable. In 1954, Vargas committed suicide during a crisis that threatened his government, and he was followed by a series of short-term presidents. In 1961, UDN won national elections for the first time, supporting Jânio Quadros, who himself was a member of a minor party allied to UDN. Quadros, who, before his election, rose meteorically in politics with an anti-corruption stance, unexpectedly resigned the presidency seven months later. Some historians suggest that Quadros was heavily drunk when he signed his resignation letter, while others suggest that Quadros felt that Congress would not accept his vice president as president and would ask for his return. Those historians, therefore, see Quadros's resignation as an attempt to return to office with increased powers and more political support. It is possible that both occurred: Quadros was drunk when he resigned, and in that state, he devised the plan to return to power by Congressional request. The plot failed: Congress simply received Quadros's letter, and amid the shock of politicians and of the nation, the letter was entered into the records of Congress, and the presidency was declared vacant. The President of Congress, Senator Auro de Moura Andrade, took the view that the deed of resignation was the province of the elected president, that it was therefore not subject to a Congressional vote, needing no confirmation, and that the president's declaration of resignation was final.

At that time, the president and vice president of Brazil were voted into office separately. The vice president was a political enemy of Jânio Quadros, the leftist João Goulart. Goulart was out of the country, and Congress was controlled by right-wing politicians. During Goulart's absence, the President of the Chamber of Deputies, Ranieri Mazzilli, took office as Acting President of Brazil. There was a plot to block the inauguration of the vice president as president, but Congressional resistance to the inauguration of Goulart led a reaction by the Governor of Rio Grande do Sul, who led a "Legality Campaign", and to a split in the military (that, during the fourth Republic, intervened heavily in politics). Amid the political crisis, the solution was the adoption by Congress of a constitutional amendment abolishing the presidential executive and replacing it with a parliamentary government. Under that negotiated solution, Goulart's inauguration was allowed to proceed, but Goulart would be head of state only, and a prime minister approved by Congress would lead the government. The new system of government's continued existence was subject to popular approval in a referendum scheduled for 1963. The result of this referendum restored the presidential executive, and a military coup deposed Goulart in 1964, starting the military dictatorship.

Political parties

Social Democratic Party
Brazilian Labour Party
Social Progressive Party
National Labour Party

No.	Portrait	President (Birth–Death)	Elected	Term of office			Political party	Vice president	R.
No.	Portrait	President (Birth–Death)	Elected	Took office	Left office	Time in office	Political party	Vice president	R.
16	esidential portrait of Gaspar Dutra	Gaspar Dutra (1883–1974)	1945	31 January 1946	31 January 1951	5 years	PSD	Vacant until 19 September 1946 Nereu Ramos (Note: Elected as vice president via an indirect election, following the promulgation of the Constitution of 1946.)	
17	Second presidential portrait of Getúlio Vargas	Getúlio Vargas (1882–1954)	1950	31 January 1951	24 August 1954	3 years, 205 days	PTB	Café Filho	
18	Presidential portrait of Café Filho	Café Filho (1899–1970)	—	24 August 1954 (Note: Café Filho succeeded to the presidency upon the death of Getúlio Vargas.)	8 November 1955 (Note: Removed from office due to health issues.)	1 year, 76 days	PSP	Vacant throughout presidency	
19	Photograph of Carlos Luz	Carlos Luz (1894–1961); Acting President	—	8 November 1955 (Note: Abiding by the presidential line of succession, Carlos Luz, President of the Chamber of Deputies, succeeded to the presidency upon the removal of Café Filho.)	11 November 1955 (Note: Impeached.)	3 days	PSD	Vacant throughout presidency	
20	Presidential portrait of Nereu Ramos	Nereu Ramos (1888–1958); Acting President	—	11 November 1955 (Note: Abiding by the presidential line of succession, Nereu Ramos, President of the Senate, succeeded to the presidency upon the removal of Carlos Luz.)	31 January 1956	81 days	PSD	Vacant throughout presidency	
21	Presidential portrait of Juscelino Kubitschek	Juscelino Kubitschek (1902–1976)	1955	31 January 1956	31 January 1961	5 years	PSD	João Goulart	
22	Presidential portrait of Jânio Quadros	Jânio Quadros (1917–1992)	1960	31 January 1961	25 August 1961	206 days	PTN	João Goulart	
23	Photograph of Ranieri Mazzilli	Ranieri Mazzilli (1910–1975); Acting President	—	25 August 1961 (Note: Ranieri Mazzilli held the presidency until the return of João Goulart to Brazil.)	7 September 1961	13 days	PSD	Vacant throughout presidency	
24	Presidential portrait of João Goulart	João Goulart (1919–1976)	—	7 September 1961 (Note: João Goulart succeeded to the presidency upon the resignation of Jânio Quadros.)	2 April 1964 (Note: Deposed by the 1964 coup d'état.)	2 years, 208 days	PTB	Vacant throughout presidency	

== Military rule (1964–1985) ==
The 1964 military coup was formented by José de Magalhães Pinto, Adhemar de Barros, and Carlos Lacerda (who had already participated in the conspiracy to depose Getúlio Vargas in 1945), then-governors of the states of Minas Gerais, São Paulo, and Guanabara, respectively. The coup was planned and executed by the most forefront commanders of the Brazilian Army and received the support of almost all high-ranking members of the military, along with conservative elements in society, like the Catholic Church and anti-communist civil movements among the Brazilian middle and upper classes. Internationally, it was supported by the State Department of the United States, through its embassy in Brasília.

Despite initial pledges to the contrary, the military regime enacted in 1967 a new, restrictive Constitution and stifled freedom of speech and political opposition. The regime adopted nationalism, economic development, and anti-communism as its guidelines.

The dictatorship reached the height of its popularity in the 1970s, with the so-called "Brazilian Miracle", even as the regime censored all media, and tortured and exiled dissidents. João Figueiredo became president in March 1979; in the same year, he passed the Amnesty Law for political crimes committed for and against the regime. While combating the "hardliners" inside the government and supporting a re-democratization policy, Figueiredo could not control the crumbling economy, chronic inflation, and concurrent fall of other military dictatorships in South America. Amid massive popular demonstrations in the streets of the main cities of the country, the first free election in 20 years were held for the national legislature in 1982. In 1985, another election was held, this time for (indirectly) electing a new president, being contested between civilian candidates for the first time since the 1960s, and being won by the opposition. In 1988, a new Constitution was passed, and Brazil officially returned to democracy. Since then, the military has remained under the control of civilian politicians, without any official role in domestic politics.

Political parties

Unaffiliated
Social Democratic Party
National Renewal Alliance
Democratic Social Party

No.	Portrait	President (Birth–Death)	Elected	Term of office			Political party	Vice president	R.
No.	Portrait	President (Birth–Death)	Elected	Took office	Left office	Time in office	Political party	Vice president	R.
25	Photograph of Ranieri Mazzilli	Ranieri Mazzilli (1910–1975); Acting President (Note: De jure head of state. The De facto leaders were the Supreme Command of the Revolution, a military junta formed by Admiral Augusto Rademaker, General Artur da Costa e Silva, and Brigadier Francisco de Assis Correia de Melo.)	—	2 April 1964	15 April 1964	13 days	PSD	Vacant throughout presidency	
26	Presidential portrait of Castelo Branco	Castelo Branco (1897–1967)	1964	15 April 1964	15 March 1967	2 years, 334 days	Unaffiliated (Note: Until 4 April 1966, date of creation of the National Renewal Alliance.) ARENA	José Maria Alkmin	
27	Presidential portrait of Costa e Silva	Costa e Silva (1899–1969)	1966	15 March 1967	31 August 1969	2 years, 169 days	ARENA	Pedro Aleixo	
—	Photograph of Pedro Aleixo	Pedro Aleixo (1901–1975)	—	Never took office (Note: Impeded from taking office by the military junta of 1969. Despite never occupying this position, Aleixo has to be included in the gallery of Presidents of Brazil by virtue of Law No. 12,486, of September 12, 2011.)			ARENA	—	
—	Photograph of the 1969 military junta	Military junta of 1969 (Note: Formed by General Aurélio de Lira Tavares, Admiral Augusto Rademaker, and Brigadier Márcio de Sousa e Melo.)	—	31 August 1969	30 October 1969	60 days	Unaffiliated	Vacant throughout leadership	
28	Presidential portrait of Emílio Médici	Emílio Médici (1905–1985)	1969	30 October 1969	15 March 1974	4 years, 136 days	ARENA	Augusto Rademaker	
29	Presidential portrait of Ernesto Geisel	Ernesto Geisel (1907–1996)	1974	15 March 1974	15 March 1979	5 years	ARENA	Adalberto Pereira	
30	Presidential portrait of João Figueiredo	João Figueiredo (1918–1999)	1978	15 March 1979	15 March 1985	6 years	ARENA (Note: Until 20 December 1979, date of dissolution of the National Renewal Alliance.) PDS (Note: From 31 January 1980, date of creation of the Democratic Social Party.)	Aureliano Chaves	

== Sixth Republic (1985–present) ==
Presidential Standard of Brazil

In the early 1980s, the military government started a process of gradual redemocratization, called abertura, the final goal of which was democracy. When the term of the last military president was to end, however, no direct elections for President of Brazil took place. For the election of the country's first civilian president since the military coup of 1964, the military maintained the rule that prevailed during the dictatorial regime, according to which an Electoral College made up of the entire National Congress and representatives from State Assemblies was to elect the president. This time, however, the military placed the Electoral College under no coercion, allowing its members to elect the president of their choice. The Chamber of Deputies and the State Assemblies had been elected, already under the abertura process in the 1982 Brazilian parliamentary election, but the senators were chosen indirectly by the State Assemblies, under rules that had been passed by the military in 1977 to counter the growing support of the opposition: one third of the senators was chosen in 1982, and two thirds had been chosen in 1978. After the 1982 elections, the ruling party, PDS (the successor of the ARENA), still controlled a majority of the seats in the National Congress.

Tancredo Neves, who had been prime minister during the presidency of João Goulart, was chosen to be the candidate of PMDB, the major opposition party (and the successor of the MDB Party, that had opposed the military regime since its inception), but Tancredo was also supported by a large political spectrum, even including a significant part of former members of ARENA, the party that supported the military presidents. In the final months of the military regime, a large section of ARENA members defected from the party, and now professed to be men of democratic inclinations. They formed the Liberal Front, and the Liberal Front Party allied itself with PMDB, forming a coalition known as the Democratic Alliance. PMDB needed the Liberal Front's support in order to secure victory in the Electoral College. In the formation of this broad coalition, former members of ARENA also switched parties and joined PMDB. So, to seal this arrangement, the spot of vice president in Tancredo Neves's ticket was given to José Sarney, who represented the former supporters of the regime that had now joined the Democratic Alliance. On the other hand, those who remained loyal to the military regime and its legacy renamed ARENA as the PDS. In the PDS's National Convention, two right-wing supporters of the military administrations fought for the party's nomination: Colonel Mário Andreazza, then-Minister of the Interior in General Figueiredo's administration, was the preferred candidate of the incumbent president and of the military elite, but he was defeated by Paulo Maluf, a civilian and former governor of São Paulo State during the military regime. Tancredo's coalition defeated Maluf, and his election was hailed as the dawn of a New Republic. Andreazza's defeat (by 493 votes to 350) and the selection of Maluf as the PDS's presidential candidate greatly contributed to the split in the party that led to the formation of the Liberal Front. The Liberal Front refused to support Maluf and joined forces with the PMDB in supporting Tancredo Neves, thus forging the Democratic Alliance. Without that split in the PDS, the election of the opposition candidate would not have been possible.

Although elected President of Brazil, Tancredo Neves became gravely ill on the eve of his inauguration and died without ever taking office. Therefore, the first civilian president since 1964 was Tancredo's running mate, José Sarney, himself an ex-member of ARENA. José Sarney's administration fulfilled Tancredo's campaign promise of passing a constitutional amendment to the Constitution inherited from the military regime, so as to summon elections for a Constituent Assembly with full powers to draft and adopt a new constitution for the country, to replace the authoritarian legislation that still remained in place. In October 1988, a new democratic Constitution was passed, consolidating democracy. In 1989, the first election for president under the new Constitution was held, and the young Fernando Collor was elected for a five-year term, the first president to be elected by direct popular ballot since the military coup. He was inaugurated in 1990, and in 1992, he became the first President of Brazil to be impeached due to corruption. However, he resigned before the final verdict.

A referendum held in 1993 (ahead of the 1993 and 1994 constitutional revision) allowed the people to decide the form of government of the state (monarchy or republic) for the first time since the proclamation of the Republic in 1889; the republican form of government prevailed. In the same referendum, the Brazilian people was able to choose, again for the first time since 1963, the system of government (parliamentary or presidential), and the model of a presidential executive was retained. The revision was a unique opportunity to amend the Constitution with a reduced majority. Had a different form or system of government been chosen in the 1993 referendum, the new institutional structure would have been implemented during the constitutional revision. Both the revision and the referendum on the form and system of government were summoned in the original text of the Constitution. The federal model of the state, retained in the 1988 Constitution, is declared by the Constitution as not subject to abolition, even by constitutional amendment. According to those tenets, and to the results of the popular vote, only minor changes were made to the institutional framework of the state in the constitutional revision, including the adoption of a constitutional amendment that reduced the presidential term of office from five to four years.

In 1995, Fernando Henrique Cardoso was inaugurated for a four-year term. In 1997, a constitutional amendment which allowed the presidents of Brazil to be re-elected to one consecutive term was enacted. In 1998, then-President Fernando Henrique Cardoso became the first president of Brazil to be re-elected for two consecutive terms. In 2003, Luiz Inácio Lula da Silva was inaugurated. He was re-elected in 2006. In 2011, Dilma Rousseff became Brazil's first female president. In 2015, she began her second term, but in 2016, the Federal Senate convicted her on impeachment charges, and she was removed from office, being succeeded by Michel Temer. In 2018, Jair Bolsonaro was elected, taking office on 1 January 2019. In 2022, former president Luiz Inácio Lula da Silva, who had served as President of Brazil from 2003 to 2010, was again elected president, thus becoming the first person to win three Brazilian presidential elections. Also in 2022, Jair Bolsonaro became Brazil's first first-term president to seek re-election for a second term and lose, since the possibility of re-election to a second consecutive term was first created in Brazil in 1997.

Political parties

Unaffiliated
Party of the Brazilian Democratic Movement → Brazilian Democratic Movement
National Reconstruction Party
Brazilian Social Democracy Party
Workers' Party
Social Liberal Party
Liberal Party

No.	Portrait	President (Birth–Death)	Elected	Term of office			Political party	Vice president	R.
No.	Portrait	President (Birth–Death)	Elected	Took office	Left office	Time in office	Political party	Vice president	R.
—	Photograph of Tancredo Neves	Tancredo Neves (1910–1985)	1985	Never took office (Note: Died before taking office. Despite never occupying this position, Neves has to be included in the gallery of Presidents of Brazil by virtue of Law No. 7,465, of April 21, 1986.)			PMDB	José Sarney	
31	Presidential portrait of José Sarney	José Sarney (b. 1930)	—	15 March 1985 (Note: Acting president from 15 March to 21 April 1985, date of death of president-elect Tancredo Neves.)	15 March 1990	5 years	PMDB	Vacant throughout presidency	
32	Presidential portrait of Fernando Collor	Fernando Collor (b. 1949)	1989	15 March 1990	29 December 1992	2 years, 289 days	PRN	Itamar Franco	
33	Presidential portrait of Itamar Franco	Itamar Franco (1930–2011)	—	29 December 1992 (Note: Acting president from 29 September to 29 December 1992, due to an impeachment process opened against Fernando Collor. Itamar Franco succeeded to the presidency upon Collor's resignation.)	1 January 1995	2 years, 3 days	Unaffiliated	Vacant throughout presidency	
34	Second presidential portrait of Fernando Henrique Cardoso	Fernando Henrique Cardoso (b. 1931)	1994 1998	1 January 1995	1 January 2003	8 years	PSDB	Marco Maciel	
35	Second presidential portrait of Luiz Inácio Lula da Silva	Luiz Inácio Lula da Silva (b. 1945)	2002 2006	1 January 2003	1 January 2011	8 years	PT	José Alencar	
36	Second presidential portrait of Dilma Rousseff	Dilma Rousseff (b. 1947)	2010 2014	1 January 2011	31 August 2016 (Note: Impeached.)	5 years, 243 days	PT	Michel Temer	
37	Presidential portrait of Michel Temer	Michel Temer (b. 1940)	—	31 August 2016 (Note: Acting president from 12 May to 31 August 2016, due to an impeachment process opened against Dilma Rousseff. Michel Temer succeeded to the presidency upon Rousseff's removal.)	1 January 2019	2 years, 123 days	MDB	Vacant throughout presidency	
38	Presidential portrait of Jair Bolsonaro	Jair Bolsonaro (b. 1955)	2018	1 January 2019	1 January 2023	4 years	PSL (Note: Until 19 November 2019.) Unaffiliated PL (Note: From 30 November 2021.)	Hamilton Mourão	
39	Third presidential portrait of Luiz Inácio Lula da Silva	Luiz Inácio Lula da Silva (b. 1945)	2022 2026	1 January 2023	Incumbent	3 years, 325 days	PT (FE Brasil)	Geraldo Alckmin	

== Presidents by birth state ==
States	Total	Presidents
Minas Gerais	9	Afonso Pena, Venceslau Brás, Delfim Moreira, Artur Bernardes, Carlos Luz, Juscelino Kubitschek, Pedro Aleixo, Tancredo Neves, Dilma Rousseff
São Paulo	7	Prudente de Morais, Campos Sales, Rodrigues Alves, Júlio Prestes, Ranieri Mazzilli, Michel Temer, Jair Bolsonaro
Rio Grande do Sul	6	Hermes da Fonseca, Getúlio Vargas, João Goulart, Costa e Silva, Emílio Médici, Ernesto Geisel
Rio de Janeiro	5	Nilo Peçanha, Washington Luís, João Figueiredo, Fernando Collor, Fernando Henrique Cardoso
Alagoas	2	Deodoro da Fonseca, Floriano Peixoto
Ceará	2	José Linhares, Castelo Branco
Bahia	1	Itamar Franco (Note: Born in a ship at the sea, was registered in Salvador.)
Mato Grosso	1	Gaspar Dutra
Mato Grosso do Sul	1	Jânio Quadros
Maranhão	1	José Sarney
Paraíba	1	Epitácio Pessoa
Pernambuco	1	Luiz Inácio Lula da Silva
Rio Grande do Norte	1	Café Filho
Santa Catarina	1	Nereu Ramos

== See also ==
- President of Brazil
- List of presidents of Brazil by time in office
- List of presidents of Brazil by age
- Brazilian presidential line of succession
- Vice President of Brazil
- List of Brazilian monarchs
- List of prime ministers of Brazil
- List of governors-general of Brazil
