= Vice President of Brazil =

Second-highest constitutional office in the Brazilian government

Vice President of the Federative Republic of Brazil
- Vice-Presidente da República Federativa do Brasil
- Coat of arms of Brazil

- Vice presidential standard

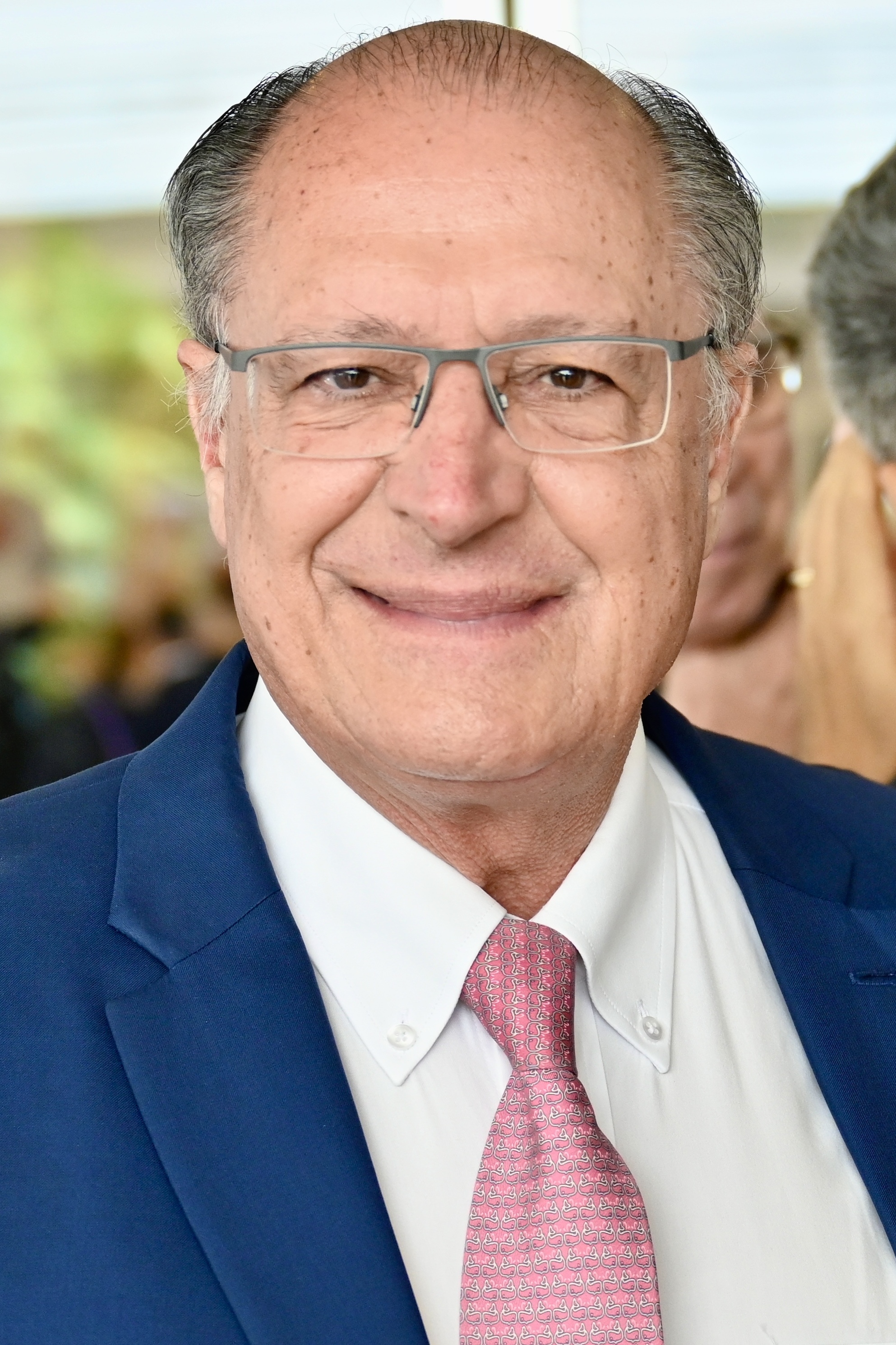
- Incumbent; Geraldo Alckmin since January 1, 2023
- Federal government of Brazil
- Style: Mr. Vice President (informal); The Most Excellent and His Excellency (formal)
- Status: Second highest executive branch officer
- Member of: Cabinet; National Defense Council
- Residence: Palácio do Jaburu
- Seat: Brasília
- Appointer: Direct popular vote (two rounds if necessary)
- Term length: Four years, renewable once consecutively
- Constituting instrument: Constitution of Brazil
- Inaugural holder: Floriano Peixoto
- Formation: February 26, 1891 (135 years ago)
- Succession: First
- Salary: R$ 39,293.32 per month
- Website: www.gov.br/planalto

The vice president of Brazil (Portuguese: vice-presidente do Brasil), officially the vice president of the Federative Republic of Brazil (vice-presidente da República Federativa do Brasil), or simply the vice president of the republic (vice-presidente da República) is the second-highest ranking government official in the executive branch of the Government of Brazil, preceded only by the president. The vice president's primary role is to replace the president in the event of their death, resignation, or impeachment conviction, and to temporarily take over the presidential powers and duties while the president is abroad, or otherwise temporarily unable to carry out their duties. The vice president is elected jointly with the president as their running mate.

The office has existed since the Proclamation of the Republic in 1889, although it was only officially instituted as of the 1891 Constitution. It has been in place throughout all of Brazil's republican history, save for the fifteen years of the Vargas Era when it was officially abolished.

== Requirements ==
The requirements to run for the office of vice president are exactly those of the presidency itself. In addition to the ordinary requirements to run for political office in Brazil, under the terms of article 14 of the Constitution, a candidate for the vice presidency must be a natural-born citizen of Brazil (which under certain circumstances may include the offspring of one or two Brazilian parents living abroad) and be at least 35 years of age.

== Election and tenure ==
The president and the vice president are elected on a single ticket for a four-year term and are inaugurated on January 1 of the year following that of the election. Both may be re-elected for a subsequent term.

Vice presidents succeeding a sitting president may be reelected for an additional term. However, the vice president is not eligible to run for a second full term, as under Brazilian law any partial term counts toward the limit of two consecutive terms. Due to the wording of the constitution's provisions on term limits, whenever the vice president serves as acting president when the president is either abroad or suspended from office as a result of impeachment, it counts as a partial term.

== Workplace and official residence ==
The vice president works in an annex building of the Palácio do Planalto. The official residence of the vice president is the Palácio do Jaburu, inaugurated in 1977.

== Ascension to the presidency ==
Since the Proclamation of the Republic in 1889, eight vice presidents have been called upon to replace former presidents: four due to death of the incumbent (Nilo Peçanha, Delfim Moreira, Café Filho, and José Sarney), two due to resignation (Floriano Peixoto and João Goulart), and two due to impeachment conviction (Note: President Fernando Collor de Mello was impeached by the Chamber of Deputies, but resigned before being convicted in the Senate, resulting in Itamar Franco becoming President while the trial of Collor continued (eventually resulting in a conviction and his disqualification from public office for eight years).) (Itamar Franco and Michel Temer).

== List of vice presidents ==
No.	Portrait	Name (Birth–Death)	Term	Party	Election	President
1		Floriano Peixoto (1839–1895)	February 26, 1891 – November 23, 1891 (Note: Assumed the presidency following the resignation of the president.)	Unaffiliated	1891	Deodoro da Fonseca
Office vacant (November 23, 1891 – November 15, 1894)						Floriano Peixoto
2		Manuel Vitorino (Note: Acting president from November 10, 1896 to March 3, 1897. President Prudente de Morais was absent from his office due to health issues.) (1853–1902)	November 15, 1894 – November 15, 1898	PRF (Federal)	1894	Prudente de Morais
3		Rosa e Silva (1857–1929)	November 15, 1898 – November 15, 1902	Unaffiliated	1898	Campos Sales
Office vacant (November 15, 1902 – June 17, 1903) (Note: Vice president-elect Silviano Brandão died before taking office, thus making the position vacant.)						Rodrigues Alves
4		Afonso Pena (Note: Elected to fill the vacancy.) (1847–1909)	June 17, 1903 – November 15, 1906	PRM	1903	Rodrigues Alves
5		Nilo Peçanha (1867–1924)	November 15, 1906 – June 14, 1909 (Note: Assumed the presidency following the death of the president.)	PRF (Fluminense)	1906	Afonso Pena
Office vacant (June 14, 1909 – November 15, 1910)						Nilo Peçanha
6		Venceslau Brás (1868–1966)	November 15, 1910 – November 15, 1914	PRM	1910	Hermes da Fonseca
7		Urbano Santos (1859–1922)	November 15, 1914 – November 15, 1918	-	1914	Venceslau Brás
8		Delfim Moreira (Note: Became interim president, as vice president, between November 15, 1918 and January 16, 1919. When president-elect Rodrigues Alves died, he continued as interim president until July 28, 1919. The Constitution of the time stipulated that the vice president would only assume the presidency definitively if the term of the president was interrupted two years after his inauguration, that is, halfway through his term.) (1868–1920)	November 15, 1918 – January 16, 1919	PRM	1918	Rodrigues Alves
Office vacant (January 16 – July 28, 1919)						Delfim Moreira
8		Delfim Moreira (1868–1920)	July 28, 1919 – July 1, 1920 (Note: Died in office.)	PRM	1918	Epitácio Pessoa
Office vacant (July 1 – November 10, 1920)						Epitácio Pessoa
9		Bueno de Paiva (1861–1928)	November 10, 1920 – November 15, 1922	PRM	1920	Epitácio Pessoa
10		Estácio Coimbra (Note: Replaced vice president-elect Urbano Santos, who had died before taking office.) (1872–1937)	November 15, 1922 – November 15, 1926	Unaffiliated (Note: Estácio Coimbra was a member of the Barreiros Republican Party, a branch of the Federal Republican Party (PRF) founded in 1894 in Pernambuco. After the dissolution of the PRF in 1897, no record exists of Coimbra joining another political party.)	—	Artur Bernardes
11		Melo Viana (1878–1954)	November 15, 1926 – October 24, 1930 (Note: Deposed by the Revolution of 1930.)	PRM	1926	Washington Luís
Office vacant (October 24, 1930 – July 16, 1934); Office abolished (July 16, 1934 – September 19, 1946) (Note: The office of vice president was abolished by the 1934 Constitution, but restored by the 1946 Constitution, promulgated on September 18 of that year. The indirect election and inauguration of the new vice president took place the following day.)						Military junta of 1930
Office vacant (October 24, 1930 – July 16, 1934); Office abolished (July 16, 1934 – September 19, 1946)						Getúlio Vargas
Office vacant (October 24, 1930 – July 16, 1934); Office abolished (July 16, 1934 – September 19, 1946)						José Linhares
Office vacant (October 24, 1930 – July 16, 1934); Office abolished (July 16, 1934 – September 19, 1946)						Eurico Gaspar Dutra
12		Nereu Ramos (1888–1958)	September 19, 1946 – January 31, 1951	PSD	1946	Eurico Gaspar Dutra
13		Café Filho (1899–1970)	January 31, 1951 – August 24, 1954	PSP	1950	Getúlio Vargas
Office vacant (August 24, 1954 – January 31, 1956)						Café Filho
Office vacant (August 24, 1954 – January 31, 1956)						Carlos Luz
Office vacant (August 24, 1954 – January 31, 1956)						Nereu Ramos
14		João Goulart (1919–1976)	January 31, 1956 – August 25, 1961	PTB	1955; 1960	Juscelino Kubitschek
14		João Goulart (1919–1976)	January 31, 1956 – August 25, 1961	PTB	1955; 1960	Jânio Quadros
Office vacant (August 25, 1961 – April 15, 1964)						Ranieri Mazzilli
Office vacant (August 25, 1961 – April 15, 1964)						João Goulart
Office vacant (August 25, 1961 – April 15, 1964)						Ranieri Mazzilli
15		José Maria Alkmin (1901–1974)	April 15, 1964 – March 15, 1967	PSD (Note: Until the dissolution of the party on October 27, 1965.)	1964	Castelo Branco
15		José Maria Alkmin (1901–1974)	April 15, 1964 – March 15, 1967	ARENA	1964	Castelo Branco
16		Pedro Aleixo (1901–1975)	March 15, 1967 – August 31, 1969 (Note: After Costa e Silva was removed from office for health issues, Pedro Aleixo was prevented from assuming the presidency by the military junta of 1969. Officially, his office was revoked on October 14 by the AI-16, signed by the military triumvirate.)	ARENA	1966	Costa e Silva
Office vacant (August 31 – October 30, 1969)						Military junta of 1969
17		Augusto Rademaker (1905–1985)	October 30, 1969 – March 15, 1974	ARENA	1969	Emílio Médici
18		Adalberto Pereira dos Santos (1905–1984)	March 15, 1974 – March 15, 1979	ARENA	1974	Ernesto Geisel
19		Aureliano Chaves (1929–2003)	March 15, 1979 – March 15, 1985	ARENA (Note: Until the dissolution of the party on December 20, 1979.)	1978	João Figueiredo
19		Aureliano Chaves (1929–2003)	March 15, 1979 – March 15, 1985	PDS	1978	João Figueiredo
19		Aureliano Chaves (1929–2003)	March 15, 1979 – March 15, 1985	PFL (Note: Aureliano Chaves was the leader and one of the founders of the Liberal Front Party, a dissident group from the Social Democratic Party (PDS), after it chose Paulo Maluf as its candidate for the 1985 presidential election. Also, he was responsible for launching the party manifesto in December 1984, together with 11 former PDS members.)	1978	João Figueiredo
20		José Sarney (Note: Acting president until the death of president-elect Tancredo Neves, who became gravely ill the night before the inauguration.) (b. 1930)	March 15, 1985 – April 21, 1985 (Note: Assumed the presidency following the death of president-elect Tancredo Neves.)	PMDB	1985	Tancredo Neves (president-elect)
Office vacant (April 21, 1985 – March 15, 1990)						José Sarney
21		Itamar Franco (1930–2011)	March 15, 1990 – December 29, 1992	PRN (Note: Until May 1992.)	1990	Fernando Collor
21		Itamar Franco (1930–2011)	March 15, 1990 – December 29, 1992	PMDB	1990	Fernando Collor
Office vacant (December 29, 1992 – January 1, 1995)						Itamar Franco
22		Marco Maciel (1940–2021)	January 1, 1995 – January 1, 2003	PFL	1994; 1998	Fernando Henrique Cardoso
23		José Alencar (1931–2011)	January 1, 2003 – January 1, 2011	PL (Note: Until September 2005.)	2002; 2006	Lula da Silva
23		José Alencar (1931–2011)	January 1, 2003 – January 1, 2011	PRB	2002; 2006	Lula da Silva
24		Michel Temer (b. 1940)	January 1, 2011 – August 31, 2016 (Note: Assumed the presidency following the impeachment of the president.)	PMDB	2010; 2014	Dilma Rousseff
Office vacant (August 31, 2016 – January 1, 2019)						Michel Temer
25		Hamilton Mourão (b. 1953)	January 1, 2019 – January 1, 2023	PRTB (Note: Until March 2022.)	2018	Jair Bolsonaro
25		Hamilton Mourão (b. 1953)	January 1, 2019 – January 1, 2023	Republicans	2018	Jair Bolsonaro
26		Geraldo Alckmin (b. 1952)	January 1, 2023 – Incumbent	PSB	2022; 2026	Lula da Silva

== See also ==
- List of current vice presidents
- President of Brazil
- List of presidents of Brazil
