= President Silva =

President Silva may refer to:

- Aníbal Cavaco Silva (born 1939), president of Portugal
- Artur da Costa e Silva (1899–1969), president of the Brazilian military government
- Luiz Inácio Lula da Silva (born 1945), president of Brazil
- Epitácio Lindolfo da Silva Pessoa (1865–1942), president of Brazil
- Artur da Silva Bernardes (1875–1955), president of Brazil
- Jânio da Silva Quadros (1917–1992), president of Brazil
