= Delfim Moreira =

President of Brazil from 1918 to 1919

His Excellency Delfim Moreira
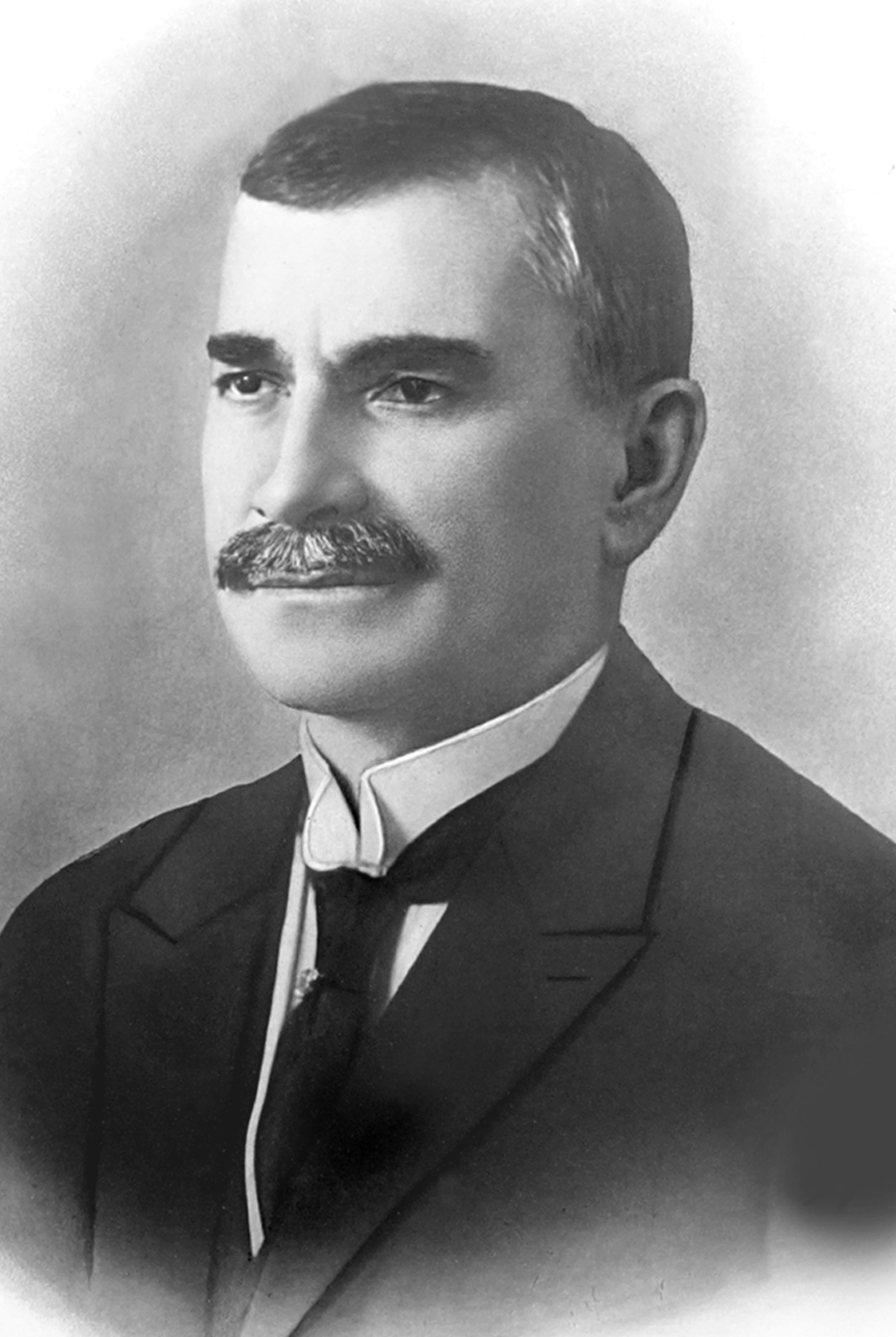
- Official portrait, 1918

10th President of Brazil
- In office 15 November 1918 – 28 July 1919; Acting: 15 November 1918 – 16 January 1919
- Vice President: None
- Preceded by: Venceslau Brás
- Succeeded by: Epitácio Pessoa

8th Vice President of Brazil
- In office 28 July 1919 – 1 July 1920
- President: Epitácio Pessoa
- Preceded by: Himself
- Succeeded by: Bueno de Paiva
- In office 15 November 1918 – 16 January 1919
- President: Rodrigues Alves (elect)
- Preceded by: Urbano Santos
- Succeeded by: Himself
Executive offices
1914–1918	President of Minas Gerais
1910–1914	Secretary of the Interior of Minas Gerais
1902–1906	Secretary of the Interior of Minas Gerais
Legislative offices
1909–1911	Federal Deputy for Minas Gerais
1907–1909	State Senator of Minas Gerais
1894–1900	State Deputy of Minas Gerais
1893–1893	President of the Municipal Chamber of Santa Rita do Sapucaí

Personal details
- Born: 7 November 1868 Cristina, Minas Gerais, Empire of Brazil
- Died: 1 July 1920 (aged 51) Santa Rita do Sapucaí, Minas Gerais, Brazil
- Party: PRM
- Spouse: Francisca Ribeiro de Abreu (m. 1891)
- Children: 6
- Parents: Antônio Moreira da Costa (father); Maria Cândida Ribeiro (mother)
- Education: Faculty of Law of Largo de São Francisco

Delfim Moreira da Costa Ribeiro (Brazilian Portuguese: [dewˈfĩ moˈɾejɾɐ da ˈkɔstɐ ʁiˈbejɾu]; 7 November 1868 – 1 July 1920) was a Brazilian politician who served as the tenth president of Brazil.

== Biography ==
He was born in the Minas Gerais state to a Portuguese father and to a Portuguese Brazilian mother who traced her ancestry back to the early settlers of Brazil.

Delfim Moreira, elected vice president under Rodrigues Alves in 1918, provisionally ruled the country as the Brazilian Constitution provided for new elections in case of disability of the president before completing two years in office. Rodrigues Alves never even entered office, for he was stricken by the "Spanish flu" and died on 16 January 1919. Delfim Moreira himself also did not have good health, suffering from some psychological conditions; therefore, his short tenure was known as "the republican regency" since the government Minister of Transportation and Public Works, Afrânio de Melo Franco, stood out in the president's decision-making.

Three days after the new government took over the country, a general strike hit the capital and the city of Niterói. The president ordered the closure of unions in Rio de Janeiro on 22 November.

On 21 June 1919, a dissident faction of the anarchists founded the Brazilian Communist Party. Four months later, the government expelled from the country about a hundred of them, mostly foreigners, who worked in the workers movement of the cities of São Paulo, Santos, Rio de Janeiro and Niterói, due to the discovery of an alleged plot aimed at overthrowing the government.

When Epitácio Pessoa was elected the new president, Moreira became his vice president. As vice president, he also served as the President of the Senate. He died in the city of Santa Rita do Sapucaí, on 1 July 1920. He was succeeded by Bueno de Paiva.

== See also ==
- List of presidents of Brazil

Political offices
Preceded by Venceslau Brás	President of Brazil; 1918–1919	Succeeded by Epitácio Pessoa
Preceded by Urbano Santos	Vice President of Brazil; 1918–1920	Succeeded by Bueno de Paiva
Preceded by Bueno Brandão	Governor of Minas Gerais; 1914–1918	Succeeded by Artur Bernardes
