= 1914 Brazilian presidential election =

- 1 March 1914

Nominee	Venceslau Brás	Ruy Barbosa
Party	PRM	PRL
Popular vote	532,107	47,782
Percentage	91.6%	8.23%
- Results by state
President before election
Hermes da Fonseca
PRC
Elected President
Venceslau Brás
PRM

Presidential elections were held in Brazil on 1 March 1914. The result was a victory for Venceslau Brás of the Mineiro Republican Party, who received 92% of the vote.

== Results ==
Candidate	Party	Votes	%
Venceslau Brás	Mineiro Republican Party	532,107	91.60
Ruy Barbosa	Liberal Republican Party	47,782	8.23
Other candidates		1,028	0.18
Total		580,917	100.00
Registered voters/turnout		1,212,882	–
Source: Nohlen
