= Silviano Brandão =

Vice President-elect of Brazil (1902)

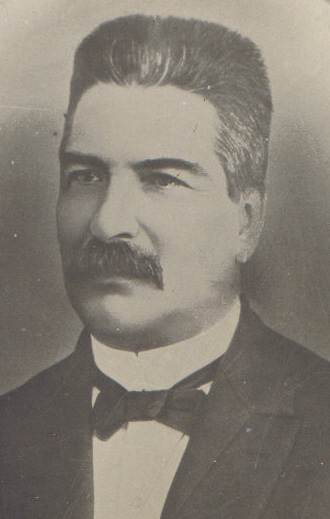

Executive offices
- 1902: Vice President-elect of Brazil
- 1898–1902: President of Minas Gerais
- 1892–1894: Secretary of the Interior and Justice of Minas Gerais

Legislative offices
- 1896–1898: President of the State Senate of Minas Gerais
- 1896–1898: State Senator of Minas Gerais
- 1891–1892: State Senator of Minas Gerais
- 1882–1884: General Deputy for Minas Gerais
- 1880–1882: Provincial Deputy of Minas Gerais

Personal details
- Born: Francisco Silviano de Almeida Brandão; 8 September 1848 Santana do Sapucaí, Minas Gerais, Empire of Brazil
- Died: 25 September 1902 (aged 54) Belo Horizonte, Minas Gerais, Brazil
- Spouse(s): Maria Isabel de Paiva Brandão (m. 1874; died 1888) Ester Cândida de Paiva Brandão (m. 1889)
- Parent(s): José Claro de Almeida (father); Ana Isabel Bueno Brandão (mother)
- Education: Faculty of Medicine of Rio de Janeiro

Francisco Silviano de Almeida Brandão (8 September 1848 – 25 September 1902) was a Brazilian politician who was elected Vice President of Brazil, but died before taking office.

In Belo Horizonte, the Silviano Brandão State Public School, founded on 5 January 1914, was named in his honour.
