= 1910 Brazilian presidential election =

- 1 March 1910

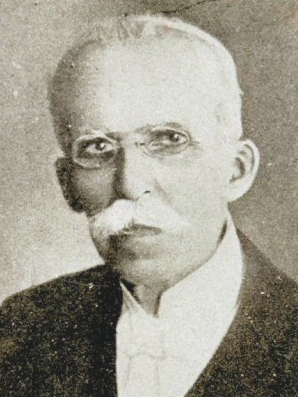
Nominee	Hermes da Fonseca	Ruy Barbosa
Party	PRC	PRP
Popular vote	403,867	222,822
Percentage	57.07%	31.49%
- Results by state
President before election
Nilo Peçanha
PRF
Elected President
Hermes da Fonseca
PRC

Presidential elections were held in Brazil on 1 March 1910. The result was a victory for Hermes da Fonseca, who received 57% of the vote. Fonseca was supported by several of the most influential Republican parties, whilst his main opponent Ruy Barbosa was supported by the Civilist Campaign, a movement opposed to da Fonseca. After the election da Fonseca was also supported by the Conservative Republican Party.

== Results ==
Candidate	Party	Votes	%
Hermes da Fonseca	Conservative Republican Party	403,867	57.07
Ruy Barbosa	Paulista Republican Party	222,822	31.49
Other candidates		80,962	11.44
Total		707,651	100.00
Source: Nohlen
