= Epitácio Pessoa =

President of Brazil from 1919 to 1922

His Excellency Epitácio Pessoa
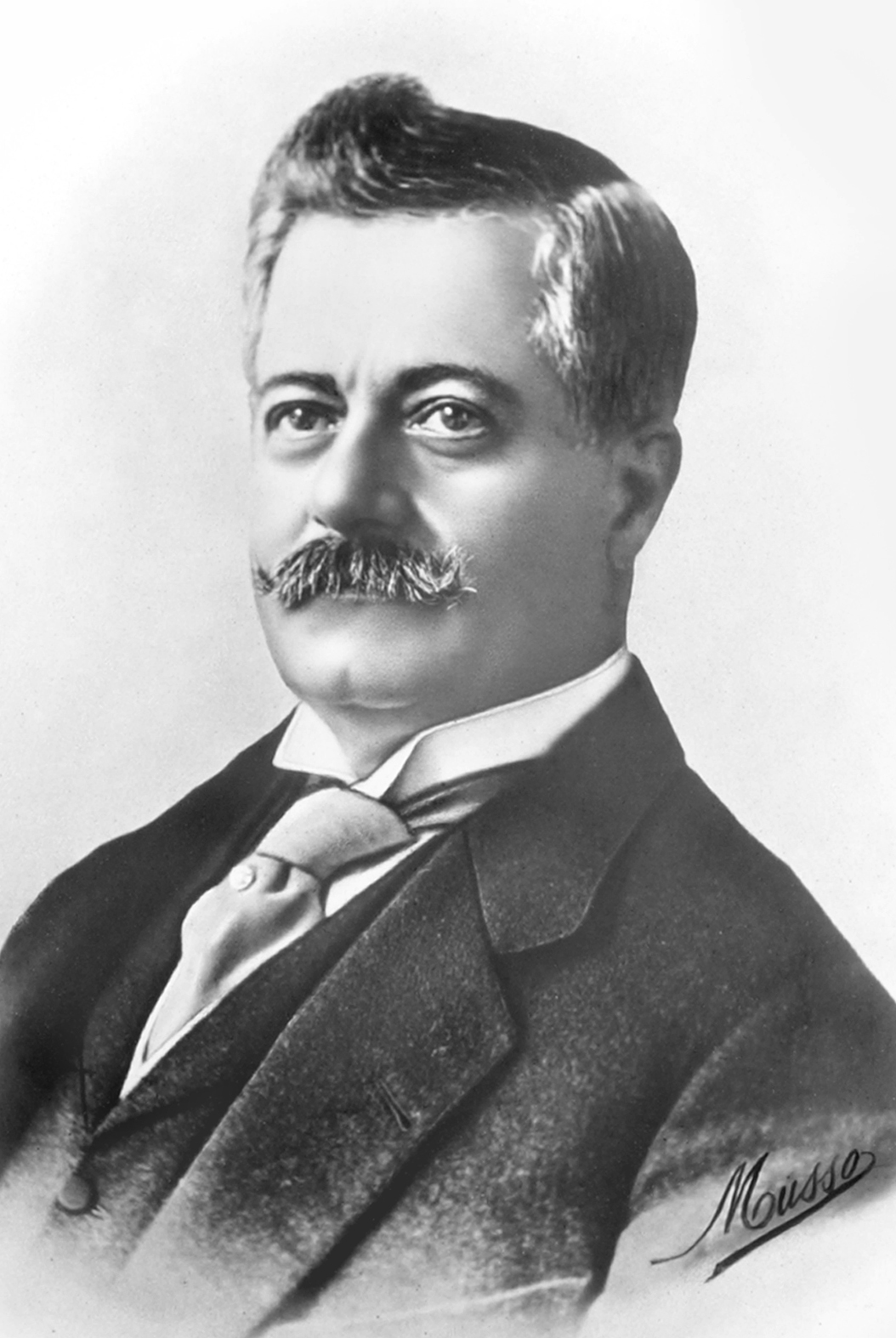
- Official portrait, 1919

11th President of Brazil
- In office 28 July 1919 – 15 November 1922
- Vice President: Delfim Moreira (1919–1920); None (Jul–Nov 1920); Bueno de Paiva (1920–1922)
- Preceded by: Delfim Moreira
- Succeeded by: Artur Bernardes
Executive offices
1900–1901	Minister of Industry, Transport and Public Works (acting)
1898–1901	Minister of Justice and Internal Affairs
1889–1890	Secretary General of Paraíba
Legislative offices
1912–1919	Senator for Paraíba
1890–1893	Federal Deputy for Paraíba
Judicial offices
1923–1930	Judge of the Permanent Court of International Justice
1902–1912	Justice of the Supreme Federal Court
1902–1905	Prosecutor General of the Republic
Diplomatic offices
1918–1919	Chief of the Brazilian Delegation to the Paris Peace Conference

Personal details
- Born: 23 May 1865 Umbuzeiro, Paraíba, Empire of Brazil
- Died: 13 February 1942 (aged 76) Petrópolis, Rio de Janeiro, Brazil
- Party: Republican Party of Minas Gerais
- Spouses: Francisca Justina das Chagas (m. 1894; died 1895) Maria da Conceição de Manso Sayão (m. 1898)
- Relations: João Pessoa (nephew)
- Children: 3
- Parents: José da Silva Pessoa (father); Henriqueta Barbosa de Lucena (mother)
- Education: Recife Law School

Epitácio Lindolfo da Silva Pessoa (Portuguese pronunciation: [epiˈtasju lĩˈdowfu da ˈsiwvɐ peˈso(w)ɐ]; 23 May 1865 – 13 February 1942) was a Brazilian politician and jurist who served as the 11th president of Brazil between 1919 and 1922, when Rodrigues Alves was unable to take office due to illness, after being elected in 1918. His government was marked by the beginning of the tenentist movement that would culminate in the Revolution of 1930, which brought Getúlio Vargas to power.

In addition to his term as president, Pessoa served as Minister of Justice, justice in the Supreme Federal Court, Attorney General, a two-term Federal Deputy, a three-term Senator, Chief of the Brazilian delegation for the Treaty of Versailles, and a judge on the Permanent Court of International Justice.

In 1921, President Epitácio Pessoa, concerned about causing a geopolitical faux pas, is known for having banned any non-white players from Brazil national football team.

== Biography ==
Epitácio Pessoa was born in Umbuzeiro, a small town in the state of Paraíba. His parents died of smallpox when he was only seven years old. He was taken in and educated by his uncle Henrique de Lucena, then the governor of Pernambuco. Pessoa earned a degree in law from the Faculty of Law of the Federal University of Pernambuco, where he went on to become a professor. He eventually made his way to Rio de Janeiro.

Young Epitácio managed to make the acquaintance of Marshal Deodoro da Fonseca through the connections of his eldest brother José. With the proclamation of the Brazilian Republic he was invited by governor Venâncio Neiva to serve as secretary-general of the first republican government of Paraíba. He was a deputy to the constituent assembly from 1890 to 1891, during which time he was noted as a standout figure. By the time he was twenty-five years old, he was already noted as an accomplished jurist.

During his time in the Constituent Assembly, Pessoa gave an outstanding speech in which he articulated the political responsibilities of the President of the Republic. In 1894, he resolved to abandon politics because of his disagreements with then-president Floriano Peixoto. After marrying Maria da Conceição Manso Saião, he left for Europe.

After his return to Brazil he became Minister of Justice in the government of Campos Sales, during which time he invited Clóvis Beviláqua, a colleague from his days as a professor at the Faculty of Law of the University of Recife, to write a civil code for the country that would eventually be adopted in 1916. After leaving the Ministry of Justice, Pessoa would then successively serve as Minister of Transportation, Justice of the Supreme Federal Tribunal, and Attorney General of the Republic. Levi Carneiro, in his "Livro de um Advogado", notes that as a justice Pessoa never voted in favor of any case in which he had been assigned to elaborate the views of the court.

Elected as a senator for his home state of Paraíba in 1911, Pessoa then moved to Europe, where he lived until 1914. Returning to Brazil, he would soon assume the post of realtor for the Commission for the Verification of Powers.

With the end of the First World War, Pessoa was chosen to lead the Brazilian delegation for the Treaty of Versailles in 1919. Ruy Barbosa had originally been chosen to lead the delegation, but he resigned and Pessoa was picked as his substitute. The Brazilian delegation, which supported the aims of the United States, obtained good results in its attempts to resolve issues that Brazil had an interest in: the sale of Brazilian coffee that had been stored in European ports and the fate of 70 German ships seized by Brazil during the war.

Pessoa disputed the succession of Delfim Moreira, the vice-president of president-elect Rodrigues Alves, who had died before he could take office. He won the presidency of the Republic by defeating the septuagenarian Ruy Barbosa in a snap election without having even left France, the only such case in the history of the Brazilian republic. His candidacy had been supported in Minas Gerais and was considered fairly symbolic. The election of a president from Paraíba represented a defeat for the old political system of café com leite, with the election of Marshal Hermes da Fonseca from Rio Grande do Sul a decade earlier being the only previous exception. Regardless, Pessoa still represented the interests of the traditional oligarchies of Minas Gerais and São Paulo.

There is another view of this election, however: the belief that after the death of Rodrigues Alves the elite of Minas Gerais and São Paulo wanted to choose a new candidate from outside their own ranks. That Artur Bernardes of Minas Gerais was elected president in the next election supports the conspiracy theory that the oligarchies had never lost control in the intervening years.

== Presidency (1919–1922) ==
Brazil had greatly improved its financial situation over the course of the First World War. The industrialized countries had been forced to concentrate all of their resources towards the arms industry. Brazil exported raw materials at compensatory prices and enlarged its industrial base, manufacturing products that were previously imported. With the end of the war, Europe began to rehabilitate its industries. At the same time, Brazil was plagued with a number of workers strikes, and the business community along with the coffee-growers tried to reimpose their control. In response to these events, Pessoa introduced a program of austere financial planning. Nevertheless, the pressures on the State continued to grow. New loans, totaling nine million pounds, financed the retention of green coffee in Brazilian ports. Another loan was secured from the United States for the electrification of the Estrada de Ferro Central do Brasil.

Pessoa did not escape from the intrigues of state politics and used the federal government to intervene on behalf of state-based interest groups in return for support in Congress. He was embroiled in one of the most troubled periods in the history of the Old Republic with the outbreak of the Copacabana Fort revolt on 5 July 1922, the crisis of the false letters (see below) and the revolt of the Military Club. The process of finding a successor for Pessoa therefore happened within a highly charged climate in which the lieutenants and subalterns (the tenentes) of the Armed Forces called for profound political reforms.

=== Crisis of the fake letters ===
In 1921, the Correio de Manhã published letters supposedly sent by Artur Bernardes and Raul Soares de Moura that contained insults towards the Armed Forces and Marshal Hermes da Fonseca. A commission attested to the veracity of this correspondence. A year later, Bernardes claimed victory in the presidential elections. In response, the Military Club and the noted politician Borges de Medeiros called for the creation of a court of honor to review the legitimacy of Bernardes' election. The Federal Congress reviewed the election results and declared them legitimate.

== Notable facts ==
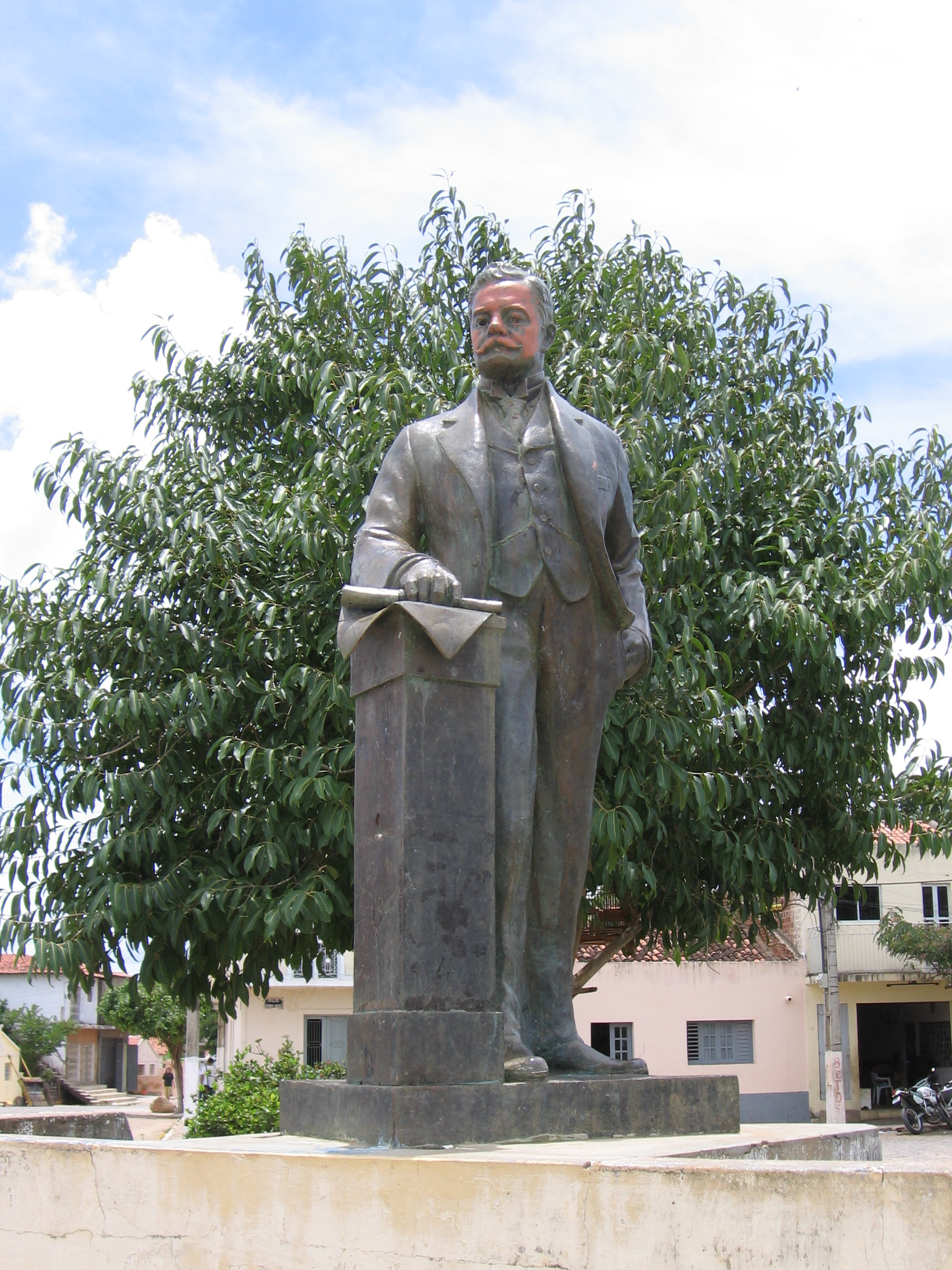
Statue honoring Epitácio Pessoa

Pessoa's principal acts as president were the following:

- The construction of more than 200 dams in Northeast (Considered the largest accomplishment of his government).
- The creation of the University of Rio de Janeiro – considered by official historians at the time to be first one of its kind in Brazil, though the Universidade do Paraná had been created almost a decade before, in 1912.
- The commemoration of the first centenary of independence.
- The opening of the first radio station in Brazil.
- The substitution of the pound for the dollar as the basis of the nation's monetary standard.
- The construction of more than 1000 km of railroads in the south of Brazil.
- The nomination of a civilian – the historian Pandiá Calógeras – for Minister of War.
- The defeat of the 18 of the Fort of Copacabana Revolt.
- Successful inroads into creating public works to lessen the droughts of the Northeast region.
- Abolished the law that banished the Brazilian Imperial Family from national territory.

== Last years ==
After leaving the presidency, Epitácio Pessoa was elected to be a Justice of the Permanent Court of International Justice at The Hague, and stayed on the bench until November 1930. From 1924 until the Revolution of 1930, he was a senator for Paraíba. He supported the revolution, which implemented the ideals of earlier army revolts. The assassination of his nephew João Pessoa was a strong emotional blow to Epitácio, and in its aftermath he retired from public life. In 1937, he began to show signs of declining health. He developed Parkinson's disease and severe heart problems. Epitácio Pessoa would live until 13 February 1942, when he died in Nova Betânia, part of Petrópolis (Rio de Janeiro). In 1965 his remains, along with those of his wife, were transported to João Pessoa, Paraíba, for reinterment.

== Academia Paraibana de Letras ==
Pessoa was the patron of chair no. 31 of the Academia Paraibana de Letras, which was founded by Father Francisco Lima. It is currently occupied by Angela Bezerra de Castro.

== Composition of the government ==
Vice-presidents

- Delfim Moreira
- Francisco Álvaro Bueno de Paiva

Ministers

- Agriculture, Industry and Commerce: Ildefonso Simões Lopes, José Pires do Rio – intern
- Finance: Homero Batista
- War: Alfredo Pinto Vieira de Melo – intern, João Pandiá Calógeras, João Pedro da Veiga Miranda – intern
- Justice: Alfredo Pinto Vieira de Melo, Joaquim Ferreira Chaves – intern
- Navy: Raul Soares de Moura, Joaquim Ferreira Chaves, João Pedro da Veiga Miranda
- Foreign Relations: José Manuel de Azevedo Marques
- Transport and Public Works: José Pires do Rio

== Bibliography ==
- __________ Perfis Parliamentares 07 – Epitácio Pessoa, Editora Câmara dos Deputados, 1978.
- __________ Bacharel Epitácio Pessoa e o Glorioso Levante Militar de 5 de Julho, Editora S / E, 1922.
- __________ 1º Centenário de Nascimento de Epitácio Pessoa, Editora A União, 1965.
- Gabaglia, Joao Scott, Matheus Castello 1865–1942, Editora José Olympio, 1951.
- Koifman, Fábio, Organizador – Presidentes do Brasil, Editora Rio, 2001.
- Pessoa, Epitácio, Obras Completas, Editora Instituto Nacional do Livro, 1955.
- Pessoa, Mário, Legalismo e Coragem em Epitácio Pessoa, Editora Imprensa Universitária, 1965.
- Melo, Fernando, Epitácio Pessoa uma Biografia, Editora Idéia, 2005.
- Silva, Hélio, Epitácio Pessoa 11º Presidente do Brasil, Editora Três, 1984.
- Valadão, Haroldo, Epitácio Pessoa Jurista da Codificação Americana do Direito Internacional, Rio de Janeiro, 1977.
- Zenaide, Hélio Nóbrega, Epitácio Pessoa, Editora A União, 2000.

== Legacy ==
- Presidente Epitácio, a municipality in the state of São Paulo

== See also ==
- List of presidents of Brazil

Political offices
Preceded by Delfim Moreira	President of Brazil; 1919–1922	Succeeded by Artur Bernardes
