= Venceslau Brás =

President of Brazil from 1914 to 1918

His Excellency Venceslau Brás
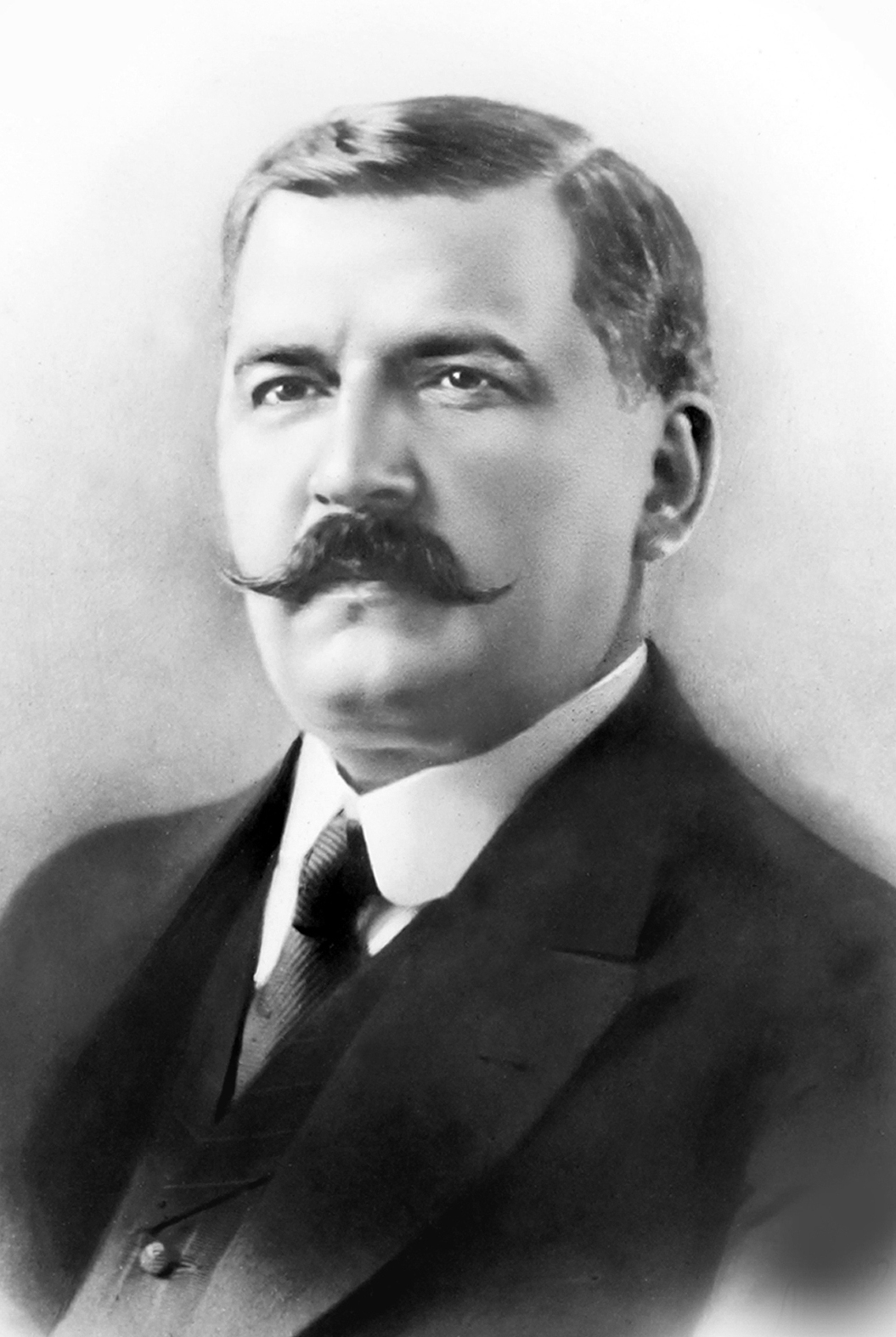
- Official portrait, 1914

9th President of Brazil
- In office 15 November 1914 – 15 November 1918
- Vice President: Urbano Santos
- Preceded by: Hermes da Fonseca
- Succeeded by: Delfim Moreira

6th Vice President of Brazil
- In office 15 November 1910 – 15 November 1914
- President: Hermes da Fonseca
- Preceded by: Nilo Peçanha
- Succeeded by: Urbano Santos
Executive offices
1909–1910	President of Minas Gerais
1898–1902	Secretary of the Interior, Justice and Public Security of Minas Gerais
1890–1891	Mayor of Monte Santo
Legislative offices
1903–1909	Federal Deputy for Minas Gerais
1892–1898	State Deputy of Minas Gerais

Personal details
- Born: 26 February 1868 São Caetano da Vargem Grande, Minas Gerais, Empire of Brazil
- Died: 15 May 1966 (aged 98) Itajubá, Minas Gerais, Brazil
- Party: PRM
- Spouse: Maria Carneiro Santiago (m. 1892; died 1925)
- Children: 7
- Parent(s): Francisco Brás Pereira Gomes (father); Isabel Pereira dos Santos (mother)
- Education: Faculty of Law of Largo de São Francisco

Venceslau Brás Pereira Gomes (Note: Throughout his life Brás spelled his name as "Wenceslau Braz", although there exist postage stamps with the spelling "Wenceslao" as well. The 1943 reform of Portuguese orthography stipulates that the names of deceased persons must be spelled according to standard Portuguese spelling rules. All Portuguese-language texts about Brás published after 1966 must therefore spell his name Venceslau Brás.) (26 February 1868 – 15 May 1966) was a Brazilian politician who served as the 9th President of Brazil from 1914 to 1918. Prior to his presidency he served as governor of Minas Gerais from 1909 to 1910, and as the 6th Vice President of Brazil under President Hermes da Fonseca from 1910 to 1914.

== Early life ==
Venceslau Brás Pereira Gomes was born in São Caetano da Vargem Grande on 26 February 1868. He came from an oligarchic family.

== Career ==
From 1909 to 1910, Brás served as governor of Minas Gerais.

== Presidency (1914–1918) ==
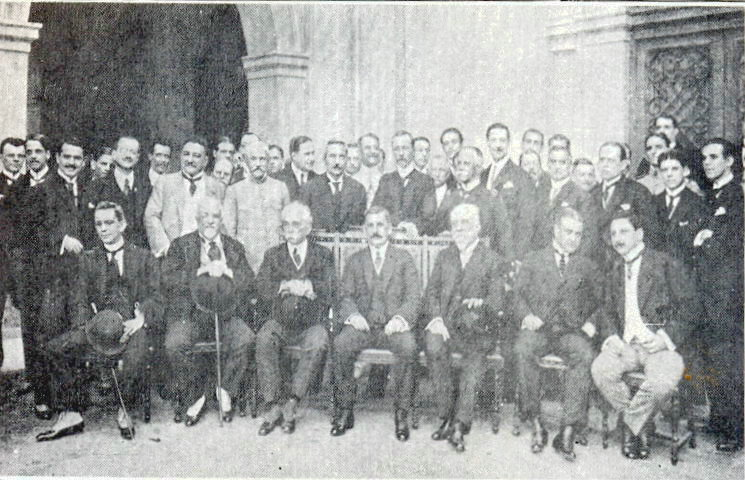
Brás and his cabinet in 1915

Brás won the 1914 presidential election with 91.6% of the vote.

Vice President Urbano Santos da Costa Araújo served as acting president from 8 September to 9 October 1917 due to Brás suffering from an illness.

=== World War I ===
Lauro Müller, the Minister of Foreign Affairs under da Fonseca, was retained in Brás' cabinet. Müller's German heritage hurt his popularity as hostility towards Germany increased in Brazil. Müller resigned on 3 May 1917, and was replaced by Nilo Peçanha.

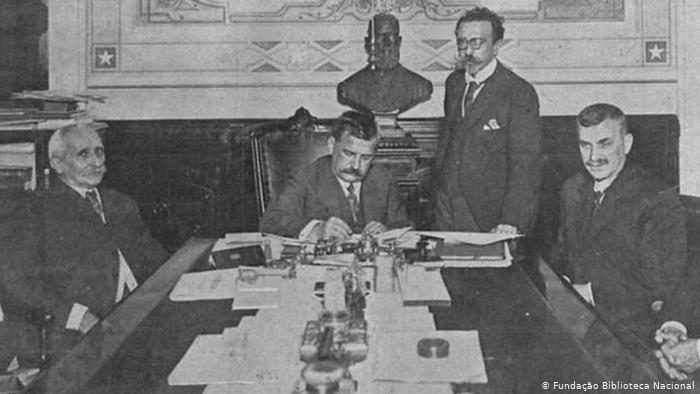
Brás signing the declaration of war against the Central Powers

Brazil remained neutral in World War I under da Fonseca. Diplomatic relations between Brazil and Germany were broken on 11 April 1917, and seized 43 German merchant ships. The Brazilian steamer Macao was sunk by a German U-boat off the coast of Spain in October. Brás called for Brazil to enter World War I "in order to maintain the dignity of the nation." The Brazilian National Congress voted to declare war on the Central Powers on 26 October.

== Death and legacy ==
Brás in 1961

Brás died in Itajubá on 15 February 1966.

Perobal was renamed to Presidente Venceslau in honour of Brás in 1921.

== Works cited ==
=== Books ===
- Lara, Fernando; Koury, Ana (2022). Street Matters: A Critical History of Twentieth-Century Urban Policy in Brazil. University of Pittsburgh Press. ISBN 9780822947134.
- Smith, Joseph (1991). Unequal Giants: Diplomatic Relations between the United States and Brazil, 1889-1930. University of Pittsburgh Press. ISBN 0822936763.
- Streeter, Michael (2009). Epitacio Pessoa: Brazil. Haus Publishing. ISBN 9781905791866.

=== Journals ===
- Lowe, Joseph (1970). "Political Participation in Brazil, 1881-1969". Luso-Brazilian Review. 7 (2). University of Wisconsin Press: 3–24. doi:10.2307/3512756. JSTOR 3512756.

=== Web ===
- "História do muncípio". Presidente Venceslau. Archived from the original on 17 October 2021.
- "Wenceslau Braz Pereira Gomes". President of Brazil. Archived from the original on 3 July 2008.
- Araujo, Rafael. "Brás, Venceslau". 1914–1918 Online. Archived from the original on 11 May 2026.

Political offices
Preceded by Hermes da Fonseca	President of Brazil; 1914–1918	Succeeded by Delfim Moreira
Preceded by Nilo Peçanha	Vice President of Brazil; 1910–1914	Succeeded by Urbano Santos da Costa Araújo
Government offices
Preceded by Júlio Bueno Brandão	Governor of Minas Gerais; 1909–1910	Succeeded by Júlio Bueno Brandão
Records
Preceded by Christopher Hornsrud	Oldest living state leader 12 December 1960 – 15 May 1966	Succeeded by Juan José Estrada
