= Urbano Santos da Costa Araújo =

Vice President of Brazil from 1914 to 1918

Urbano Santos
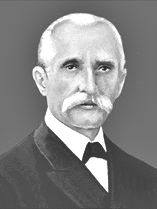

7th Vice President of Brazil
- In office 15 November 1914 – 15 November 1918
- President: Venceslau Brás
- Preceded by: Venceslau Brás
- Succeeded by: Delfim Moreira

Acting President of Brazil
- In office 8 September 1917 – 9 October 1917
- Vice President: Himself
- Preceded by: Venceslau Brás
- Succeeded by: Venceslau Brás

Executive offices
- 1919–1922: President of Maranhão
- 1918–1919: Minister of Justice and Internal Affairs
- 1918–1918: President of Maranhão

Legislative offices
- 1906–1914: Senator for Maranhão
- 1897–1905: Federal Deputy for Maranhão

Personal details
- Born: 3 February 1859 Guimarães, Maranhão, Empire of Brazil
- Died: 7 May 1922 (aged 63) Rio de Janeiro, Federal District, Brazil
- Spouse: Maria Filomena de Macedo (m. 1888)
- Children: 2
- Parent: Antônio Brício de Araújo (father)
- Education: Faculty of Law of Recife
- Occupation: lawyer; magistrate; politician; prosecutor

Urbano Santos da Costa Araújo (February 3, 1859 – May 7, 1922) was a Brazilian politician who was the vice president of Brazil from November 15, 1914, to November 15, 1918, under Venceslau Brás. As the vice president of Brazil, he also served as the president of the Senate.

Political offices
Preceded by Venceslau Brás	Vice President of Brazil; 1914–1918	Succeeded by Delfim Moreira
