= Presidency of Itamar Franco =

Brazilian presidential administration from 1992 to 1995

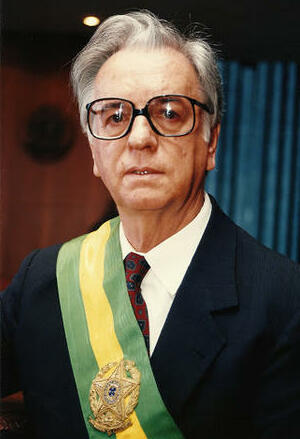
- Presidency of Itamar Franco; 29 December 1992 – 1 January 1995
- Vice President: None
- Cabinet: See list
- Party: PMDB
- Seat: Alvorada Palace

The presidency of Itamar Franco began on 29 December 1992, with the resignation of Fernando Collor de Mello, and ended on 1 January 1995, when Fernando Henrique Cardoso took office.

Itamar government was characterized by the stabilization of the economy and the control of inflation, which occurred after the nomination of Fernando Henrique Cardoso to the Ministry of Finance, whose main project was the Plano Real (English: Real Plan). His administration was informally known as the República do Pão de Queijo ("Republic of Cheese Bread"), as the majority of his cabinet was composed of people from Minas Gerais. He advocated the relaunch of the VW Beetle, which became known as the Fusca do Itamar ("Itamar VW Beetle"). It recorded 10% growth in GDP and 6.78% in per capita income. Itamar assumed office with inflation at 1191.09% and handed over at 22.41%.

== Background ==
=== Impeachment of Fernando Collor ===
In 1992, Fernando Collor was indicted for illegal fundraising involving his campaign treasurer, PC Farias. The investigations by the Parliamentary Inquiry Commission (CPMI) revealed that Collor benefited directly from the corruption scheme. During the investigations, vice-president Itamar claimed to be innocent. Afterwards, he left the PRN, Collor's party, and returned to the PMDB, which he left in 1986 to run for governor of Minas Gerais.

On 29 September 1992, the National Congress approved Collor's temporary removal as president, leaving Itamar as Brazil's interim president. On 29 December 1992, Collor was officially removed from office and Itamar became Brazil's president.

=== Plebiscite of 1993 ===
In April 1993, the government held a plebiscite to choose the form and system of government in Brazil, as required by the 1988 Constitution. Almost 30% of the voters did not attend the referendum or canceled their vote. Among those who appeared at the polls, 66% voted in favor of a republic and 10% in favor of a monarchy. Presidentialism received 55% of the votes, and parliamentarism (Itamar's preferred system) received 25% of the votes. Based on the results, the republican and presidential regime was maintained.

== Internal policy ==
=== Economic policies ===
==== Plano Real ====
Between October 1992 and May 1993, Itamar appointed three people to the Ministry of Finance (Gustavo Krause, Paulo Haddad, and Eliseu Resende), but none of them managed to solve the problems of the Brazilian economy. In May 1993, Fernando Henrique Cardoso, a Brazilian sociologist, was invited to assume the Ministry of Finance. Along with his team, he developed the Plano Real, which solved Brazil's economic problems and stabilized inflation.

The Plano Real was implemented in three stages throughout 1993 and 1994, which included stabilizing public accounts by reducing spending and increasing revenue, launching a virtual currency to prepare for the transition from the cruzeiro real to the real and launching the new currency, the real. Immediately, the project caused inflation in Brazil to fall considerably. In 1993, annual inflation in Brazil was 2477%; in 1994, 916%; and in 1995, 22%.

Some criticisms related to the amount of privatizations made by the government, the increase in unemployment, and the reduction in workers' purchasing power were raised. Itamar supported the candidacy of FHC, launched by the PSDB. In the 1994 elections, FHC was elected president in the first round with 54% of the vote.

==== His own economic views ====
Unlike Collo, Franco opposed neoliberal economic reforms and even criticized a free market economy, while there was still some privatization under him, he moved towards economic nationalism and developmentalism. While ideological he was considered a populist nationalist, it wasn't clear before his vice-presidency what economic views he had.

=== Health ===
During the Itamar government, the 9th National Health Conference was held, and the new Norma Operacional Básica do SUS ("SUS Basic Operational Standard"), the first to break with the logic of Inamps, was published in 1993. Regarding the fight against diseases, the Plano Nacional de Eliminação do Sarampo ("National Plan for the Elimination of Measles") and the Projeto Aids I ("Aids Project I"), based on an agreement with the World Bank, stand out. The Programa de Saúde da Família, PSF ("Family Health Programme"PSF) was launched as part of a strategy to restructure the SUS care model in order to intensify municipalization.

=== Education ===
In 1993, the Plano Decenal de Educação para Todos ("Ten-Year Plan for Education for All") was launched in response to the Jomtien Conference with the goal of guaranteeing minimum learning content for children, young people, and adults. In the same year, Brazil participated in the New Delhi Declaration on Education for All, which included a commitment by the world's nine most populous developing countries to achieve the goals set at Jomtien.

=== Environmental policy ===
On November 19, 1992, the Ministry of the Environment was created. The National Congress approved and the Executive ratified Brazil's accession to two of the United Nations Conventions resulting from the Earth Summit: the United Nations Framework Convention on Climate Change and the Convention on Biological Diversity. In 1993, disputes over the demarcation of the Raposa Serra do Sol territory in Roraima began. During the Itamar government, 16 indigenous lands were approved, covering 5,432,437 hectares.

== See also ==
- History of Brazil (1985–present)
- Impeachment of Fernando Collor
- Economy of Brazil
