= 1894 Brazilian general election =

- 1 March 1894
- Presidential election

Candidate	Prudente de Morais	Afonso Pena
Party	PRP	PRM
Popular vote	276,583	38,291
Percentage	80.15%	11.1%
- Results by state
President before election
Floriano Peixoto
Independent
Elected President
Prudente de Morais
PRP

General elections were held in Brazil on 1 March 1894 to elect the president and both houses of Congress. The presidential election was won by Prudente de Morais of the Paulista Republican Party, who received 80% of the vote.

== Results ==
=== President ===
Candidate	Party	Votes	%
Prudente de Morais	Paulista Republican Party	276,583	80.15
Afonso Pena	Mineiro Republican Party	38,291	11.10
Cesário Alvim	Mineiro Republican Party	3,719	1.08
Ruy Barbosa	Bahia Republican Party	3,718	1.08
José Luiz de Almeida Couto		3,437	1.00
Lauro Sodré	Paraná Republican Party	1,983	0.57
Other candidates		17,366	5.03
Total		345,097	100.00
Source: Nohlen
