= Conservative Republican Party (Brazil) =

Conservative Republican Party Partido Republicano Conservador
- Historical leaders: Pinheiro Machado, Hermes da Fonseca
- Founded: 1910
- Dissolved: October 25, 1930
- Merger of: Riograndese Republican Party; Republican Party of Alagoas; Federal Republican Party of Amazonas (faction); Republican Party of Bahia; Cearense Republican Party; Republican Party of Federal District; Espirito-Santense Republican Party; Republican Party of Maranhão; Federal Republican Party of Maranhão; Mato-Grossense Coalition; Republican Party of Pará (faction); Republican Party of Paraiba; Republican Party of Piauí; Republican Party of Rio de Janeiro (faction); Republican Party of Sergipe
- Headquarters: Brasília, Brazil
- Ideology: Republicanism; Conservatism; Populism
- Political position: Right-wing

The Conservative Republican Party (Portuguese: Partido Republicano Conservador, PRC) was a Brazilian political party founded in October 1910 to represent the republican and oligarchic ideals of agrarian elites of states discontented with the domination of the states of São Paulo and Minas Gerais ("café com leite") during the República Velha.

Its main representatives were Rio Grande do Sul Senator José Gomes Pinheiro Machado and Marshal Hermes da Fonseca, who was elected president of the republic from 1910 to 1914. The party was essentially a coalition of many state parties, notably including the Riograndese Republican Party, which was where Pinheiro Machedo came from.

The PRC declined from 1915 with the death of Pinheiro Machado. By 1918, most of the party sectors had become independent parties. By 1930, only one active party in Pará continued to uphold the name of PRC. It nominated Franco Paulino dos Santos Martires for the 1933 election and was defeated by the officialist Liberal Party of Governor Magalhães Barata.
