= Mineiro Republican Party =

Mineiro Republican Party Partido Republicano Mineiro
- Abbreviation: PRM
- Historical leaders: Afonso Pena, Venceslau Brás, Delfim Moreira, Epitácio Pessoa, Artur Bernardes
- Founded: 4 June 1888
- Dissolved: 2 December 1937
- Succeeded by: Republican Party
- Headquarters: Belo Horizonte
- Ideology: Republicanism; Federalism; Regionalism; Agrarianism; Milk coffee politics Economic liberalism Brazilian nationalism Conservatism
- Political position: Centre-right
- National affiliation: Liberal Alliance (1929–1930); Brazilian Democratic Union (1937)
- International affiliation: None

The Mineiro Republican Party (Portuguese: Partido Republicano Mineiro, PRM) was a Brazilian political party founded on 4 June 1888 and active until its extinction on 2 December 1937 by Decree No. 37 – issued by Getúlio Vargas during the Estado Novo – which abolished all political parties in Brazil. It was one of Brazil's two most powerful parties during the First Brazilian Republic along with the Paulista Republican Party.

== History ==
=== Creation ===
The Mineiro Republican Party was founded on 4 June 1888 shortly before the proclamation of the republic in Brazil.

== Main representatives ==
- Afonso Pena: President of Brazil (1906–1909)
- Venceslau Brás: President of Brazil (1914–1918)
- Delfim Moreira: President of Brazil (1918–1919)
- Epitácio Pessoa: President of Brazil (1919–1922)
- Artur Bernardes: President of Brazil (1922–1926)
- Antônio Carlos Ribeiro de Andrada: President of the State of Minas Gerais (1926–1930)
