= List of first ladies of Brazil =

First Lady of Brazil
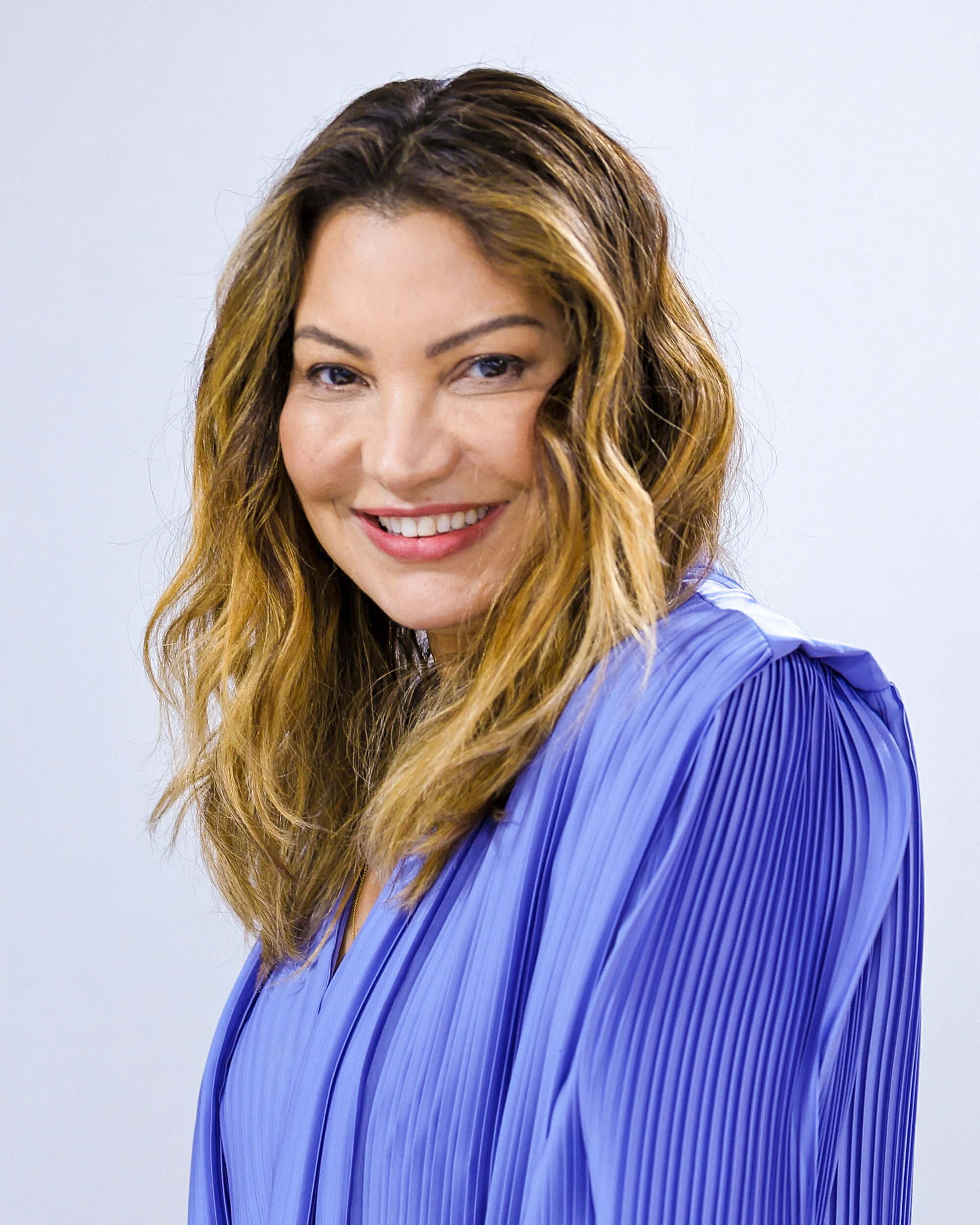
- Currently in role Rosângela Lula da Silva since January 1, 2023
- Style: Dona
- Residence: Palácio da Alvorada
- Inaugural holder: Mariana da Fonseca

The First Lady of Brazil is the hostess of the Palácio da Alvorada. The position is traditionally held by the wife of the president of Brazil, but the title may be applied to president's daughter in the case that he is widowed. The first lady is not an elected position; she does not perform official duties nor receive a salary. However, she attends official ceremonies alongside or instead of the president, and is traditionally associated with the defense of social causes.

There have been a total of 37 first ladies and 39 first ladyships. This discrepancy exists because Darcy Vargas, married to Getúlio Vargas, and Sylvia Mazzilli, married to Ranieri Mazzilli, assumed the position two times each. Following Luiz Inácio Lula da Silva's inauguration on January 1, 2023, his wife, Rosângela Lula da Silva, became the 39th First Lady of Brazil.

There are five living former first ladies: Maria Thereza Goulart, widow of João Goulart; Marly Sarney, married to José Sarney; Rosane Malta, former wife of Fernando Collor; Marcela Temer, married to Michel Temer; and Michelle Bolsonaro, married to Jair Bolsonaro. The first First Lady was Mariana da Fonseca, married to Deodoro da Fonseca. Hermes da Fonseca was the only president to remarry during his presidential term. Dilma Rousseff, the first and only female president in Brazil to date, was twice divorced before assuming, meaning that her presidency did not bring a first gentleman.

== Current living first ladies ==
Living first ladies as of March 2024 (from oldest to youngest):

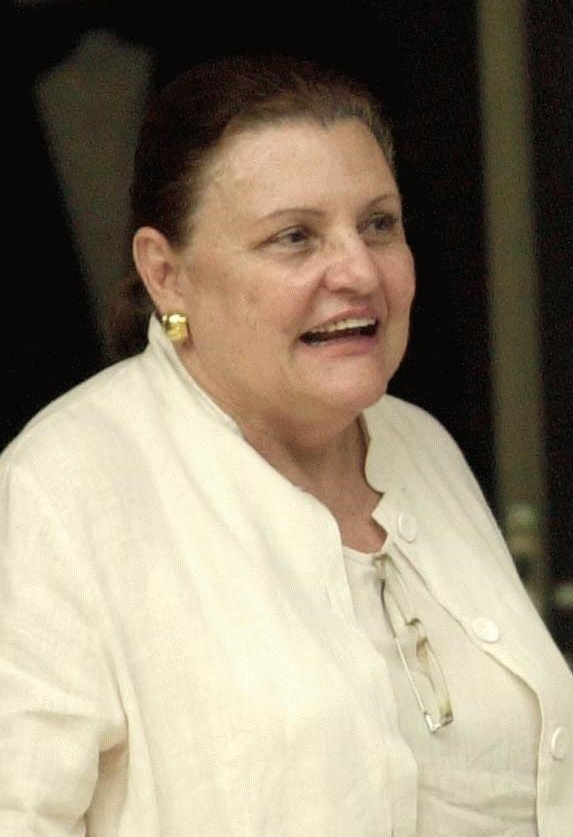
Marly Sarney
(1985–1990)
Born December 4, 1931
(age 94)

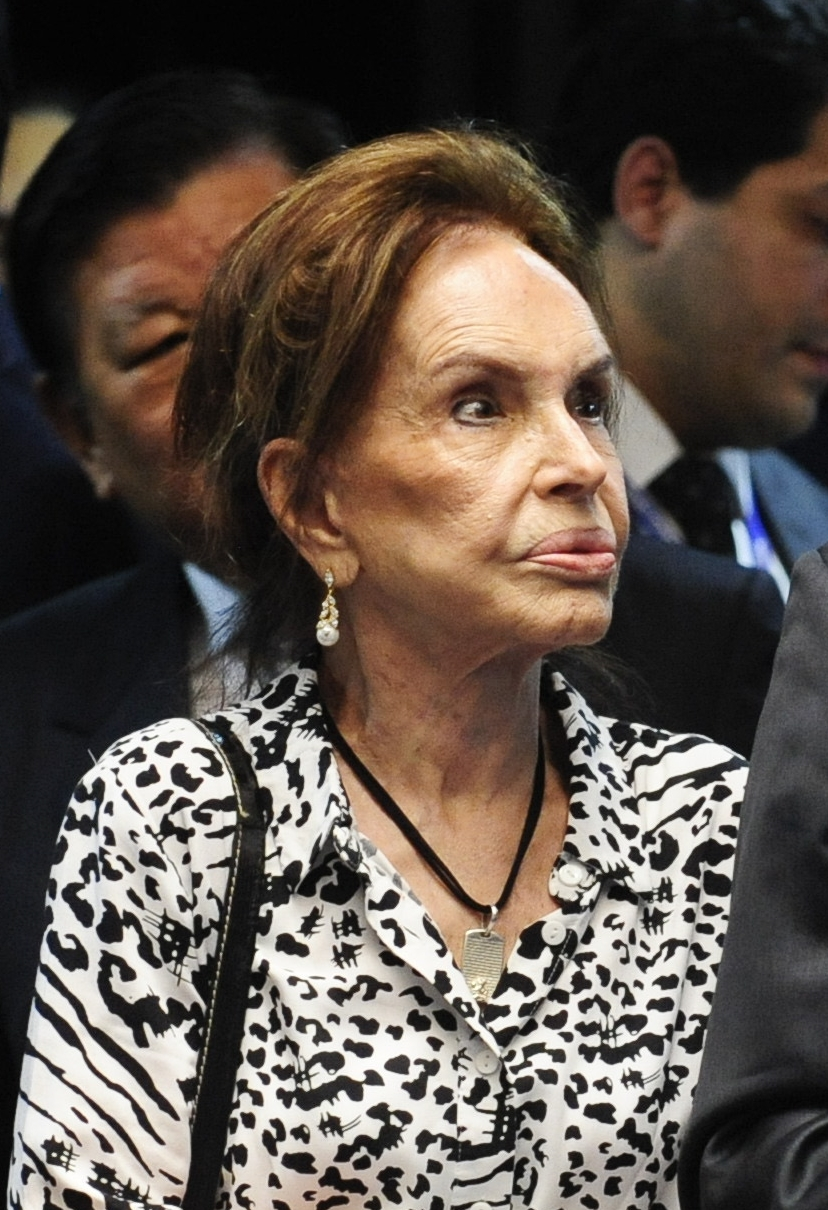
Maria Thereza Goulart
(1961–1964)
Born August 23, 1936
(age 90)

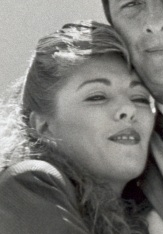
Rosane Malta
(1990–1992)
Born October 20, 1964
(age 61)

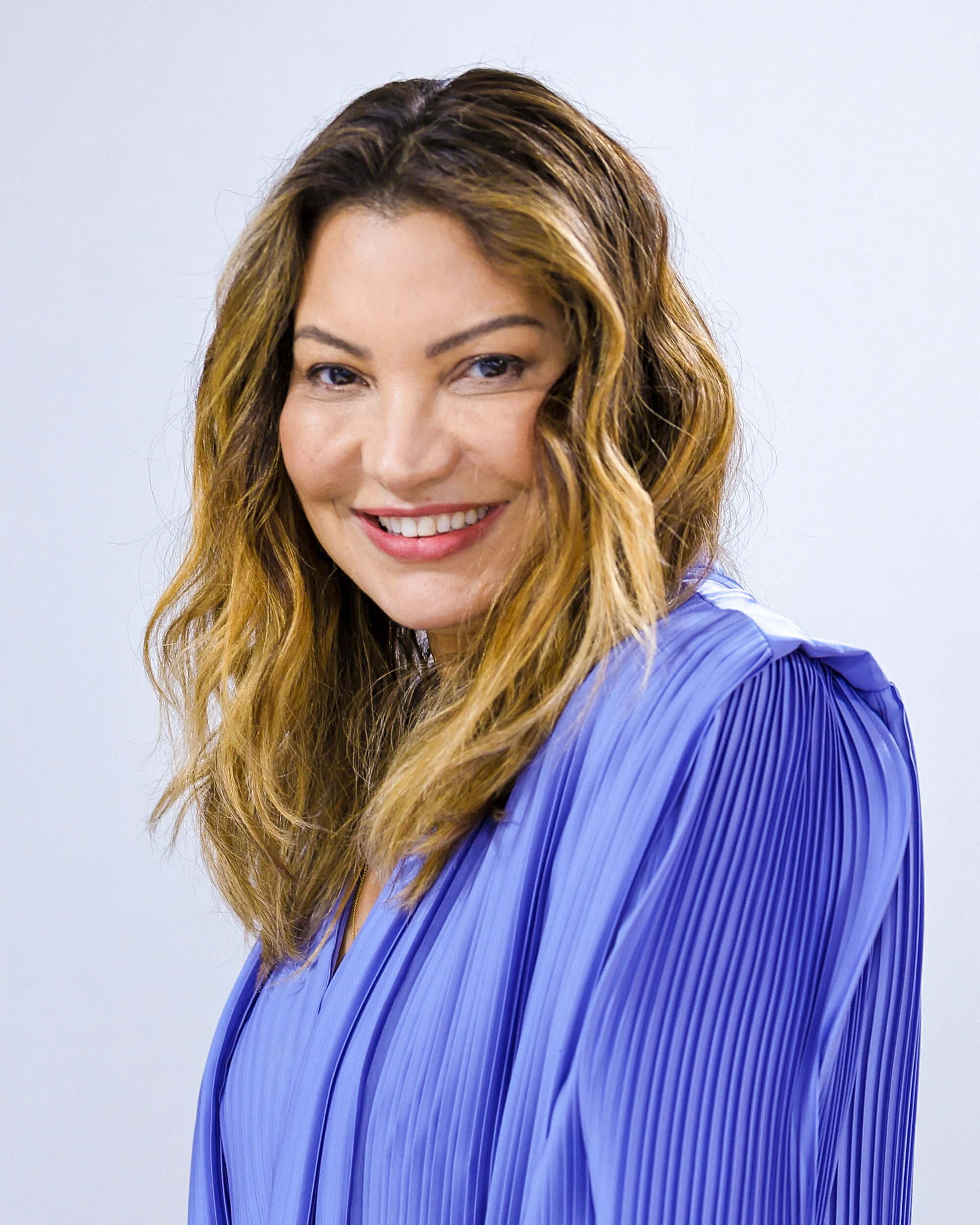
Rosângela Lula da Silva
(2023–present)
Born August 27, 1966
(age 60)

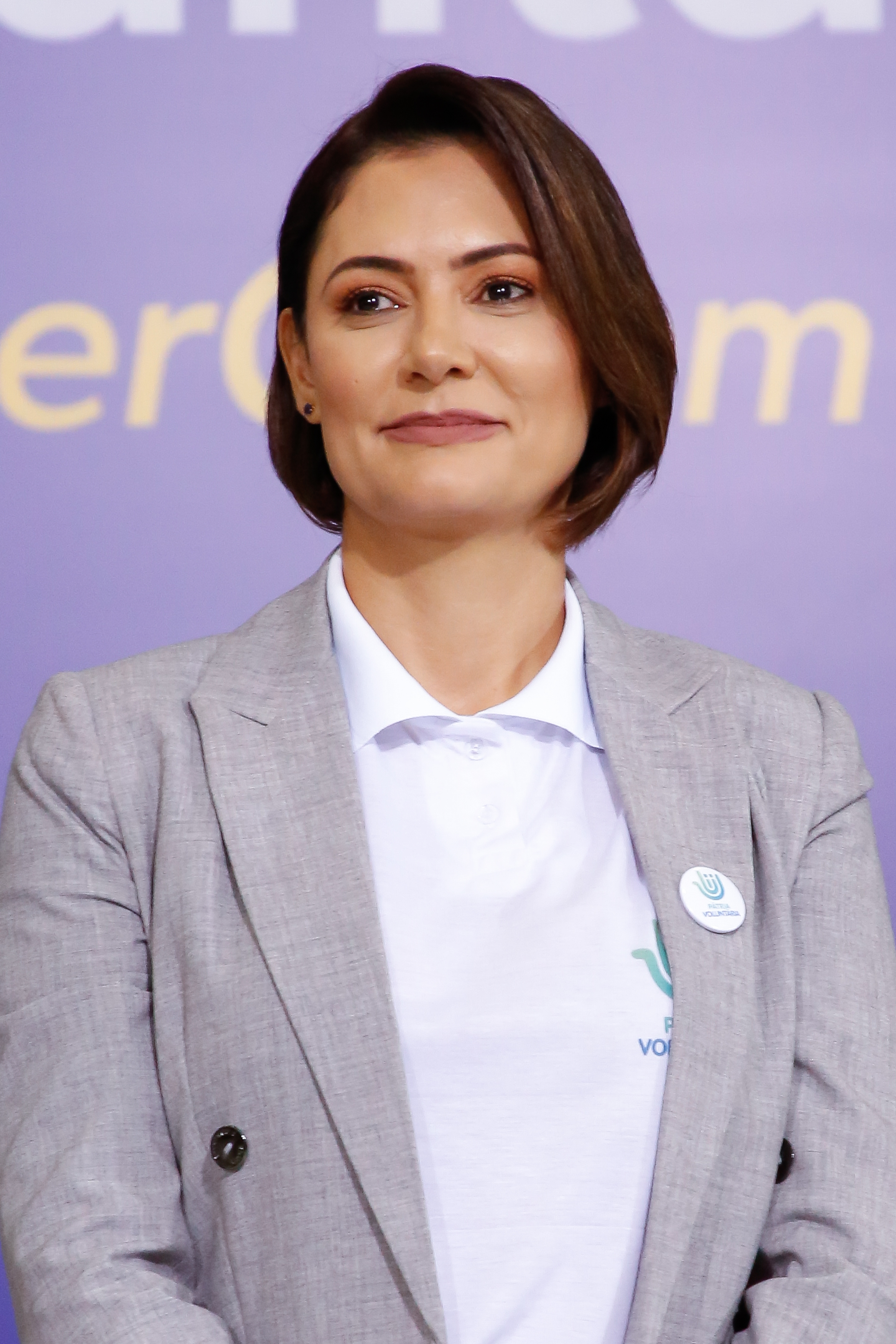
Michelle Bolsonaro
(2019–2022)
Born March 22, 1982
(age 44)

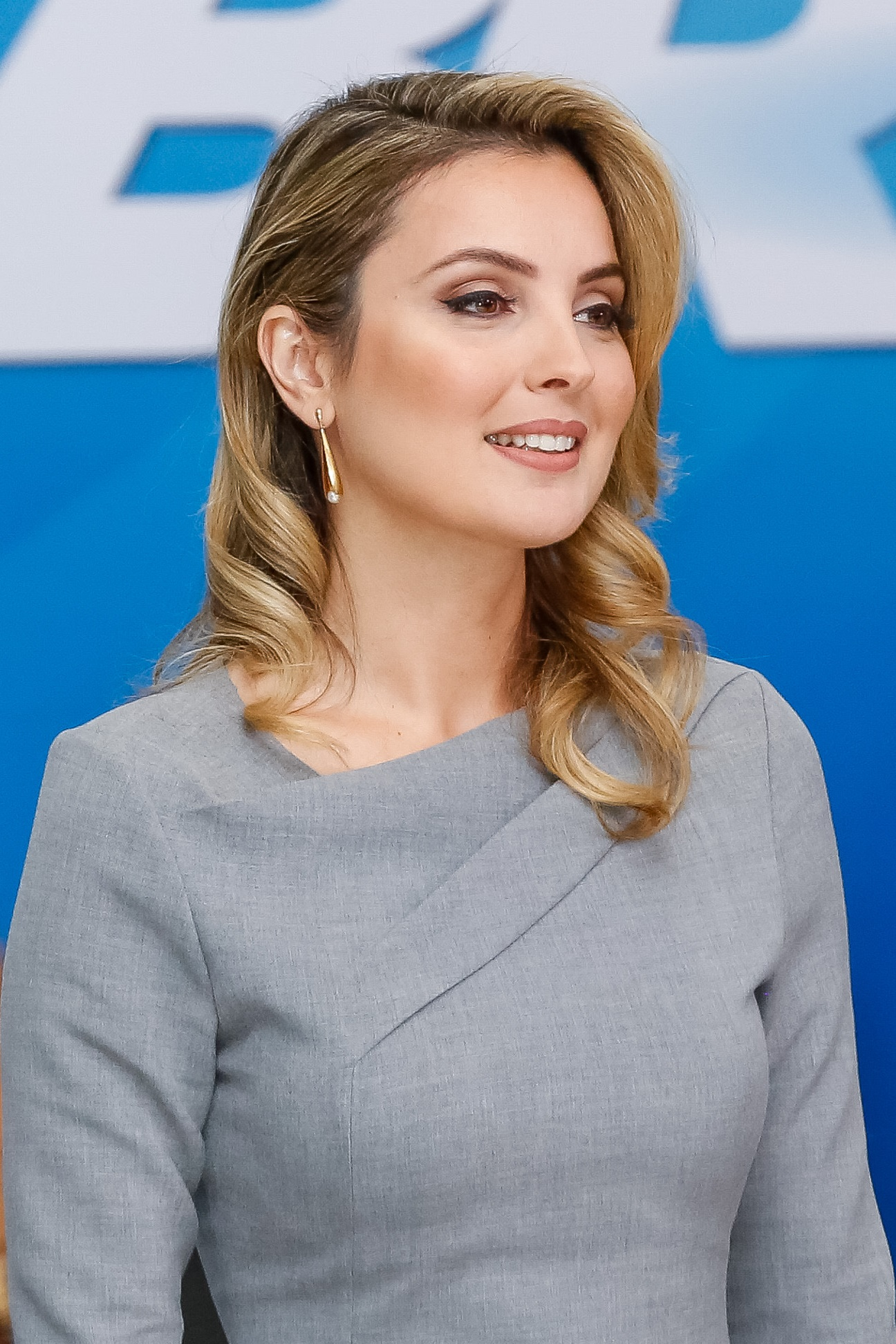
Marcela Temer
(2016–2018)
Born May 16, 1983
(age 43)

== List ==
This list includes all women who served as first ladies.

Pres. No.	Portrait	Name	Tenure	Age at tenure start	President (Spouse, unless noted)
1		Mariana da Fonseca; February 10, 1826 – April 9, 1905	November 15, 1889 – November 23, 1891	63 years, 278 days	Deodoro da Fonseca m. April 16, 1860
2		Josina Peixoto; August 9, 1857 – November 5, 1911	November 23, 1891 – November 15, 1894	34 years, 106 days	Floriano Peixoto m. May 11, 1872
3		Adelaide de Morais; September 17, 1848 – November 8, 1911	November 15, 1894 – November 15, 1898	46 years, 59 days	Prudente de Morais m. May 28, 1866
4		Ana Gabriela de Campos Sales; January 24, 1850 – July 31, 1919	November 15, 1898 – November 15, 1902	48 years, 295 days	Campos Sales m. July 8, 1865
5		Ana "Cetita" Alves; October 5, 1879 – November 5, 1958	November 15, 1902 – December 8, 1904	23 years, 41 days	Rodrigues Alves; Father
5		Maria "Marieta" Alves; November 18, 1880 – January 29, 1957	December 8, 1904 – November 15, 1906	24 years, 20 days	Rodrigues Alves; Father
6		Guilhermina Pena; June 21, 1857 – July 14, 1929	November 15, 1906 – June 14, 1909	49 years, 147 days	Afonso Pena m. January 23, 1875
7		Anita Peçanha; March 21, 1876 – April 9, 1960	June 14, 1909 – November 15, 1910	33 years, 85 days	Nilo Peçanha m. December 6, 1895
8		Orsina da Fonseca; December 17, 1858 – November 30, 1912	November 15, 1910 – † November 30, 1912	51 years, 333 days	Hermes da Fonseca m. April 16, 1879
8	Vacant		November 30, 1912 – December 8, 1913	Vacant	Hermes da Fonseca; Widower
8		Nair de Teffé; June 10, 1886 – June 10, 1981	December 8, 1913 – November 15, 1914	27 years, 181 days	Hermes da Fonseca m. December 8, 1913; Married while President
9		Maria Pereira Gomes; August 19, 1875 – August 14, 1925	November 15, 1914 – November 15, 1918	39 years, 88 days	Venceslau Brás m. September 12, 1892
10		Francisca Ribeiro de Abreu; October 9, 1877 – July 18, 1965	November 15, 1918 – July 28, 1919	41 years, 37 days	Delfim Moreira m. April 11, 1891
11		Mary Pessoa; June 3, 1878 – October 31, 1958	July 28, 1919 – November 15, 1922	41 years, 55 days	Epitácio Pessoa m. November 8, 1898
12		Clélia Bernardes; February 4, 1876 – June 10, 1972	November 15, 1922 – November 15, 1926	46 years, 284 days	Artur Bernardes m. July 15, 1903
13		Sophia Pereira de Sousa; September 27, 1877 – June 28, 1934	November 15, 1926 – October 24, 1930	49 years, 49 days	Washington Luís m. March 6, 1900
14		Darcy Vargas; December 12, 1895 – June 25, 1968	November 3, 1930 – October 29, 1945	34 years, 326 days	Getúlio Vargas m. March 4, 1911
15		Luzia Linhares; June 8, 1887 – September 14, 1969	October 29, 1945 – January 31, 1946	58 years, 143 days	José Linhares m. April 26, 1913
16		Carmela Dutra; September 17, 1884 – October 9, 1947	January 31, 1946 – † October 9, 1947	61 years, 136 days	Eurico G. Dutra m. February 19, 1914
16	Vacant		October 9, 1947 – January 31, 1951	Vacant	Eurico G. Dutra; Widower
17		Darcy Vargas; December 12, 1895 – June 25, 1968	January 31, 1951 – August 24, 1954	58 years, 50 days	Getúlio Vargas m. March 4, 1911
18		Jandira Café; September 17, 1903 – February 28, 1989	August 24, 1954 – November 8, 1955	50 years, 341 days	Café Filho m. September 17, 1921
19		Graciema da Luz; January 8, 1903 – February 25, 1983	November 8, 1955 – November 11, 1955	52 years, 304 days	Carlos Luz m. June 30, 1927
20		Beatriz Ramos; October 9, 1898 – June 1, 1991	November 11, 1955 – January 31, 1956	57 years, 33 days	Nereu Ramos m. August 15, 1916
21		Sarah Kubitschek; October 5, 1908 – February 4, 1996	January 31, 1956 – January 31, 1961	47 years, 118 days	Juscelino Kubitschek m. December 30, 1931
22		Eloá Quadros; June 13, 1923 – November 22, 1990	January 31, 1961 – August 25, 1961	37 years, 232 days	Jânio Quadros m. September 26, 1942
23		Sylvia Mazzilli; July 8, 1911 – June 6, 1993	August 25, 1961 – September 7, 1961	50 years, 48 days	Ranieri Mazzilli m. June 27, 1933
24		Maria Thereza Goulart; Born August 23, 1936	September 7, 1961 – April 2, 1964	25 years, 15 days	João Goulart m. April 26, 1955
25		Sylvia Mazzilli; July 8, 1911 – June 6, 1993	April 2, 1964 – April 15, 1964	52 years, 269 days	Ranieri Mazzilli m. June 27, 1933
26		Antonieta Castelo Branco; November 7, 1922 – October 31, 2010	April 15, 1964 – March 15, 1967	41 years, 160 days	Humberto C. Branco; Father
27		Yolanda da Costa e Silva; October 30, 1907 – July 28, 1991	March 15, 1967 – August 31, 1969	59 years, 136 days	Artur da Costa e Silva m. September 22, 1925
28		Scylla Médici; October 4, 1907 – January 25, 2003	October 30, 1969 – March 15, 1974	62 years, 26 days	Emílio G. Médici m. May 2, 1931
29		Lucy Geisel; November 24, 1917 – March 3, 2000	March 15, 1974 – March 15, 1979	56 years, 111 days	Ernesto Geisel m. January 10, 1940
30		Dulce Figueiredo; May 11, 1923 – June 6, 2011	March 15, 1979 – March 15, 1985	55 years, 308 days	João Figueiredo m. January 15, 1942
31		Marly Sarney; Born December 4, 1931	March 15, 1985 – March 15, 1990	53 years, 101 days	José Sarney m. July 12, 1952
32		Rosane Collor; Born October 20, 1964	March 15, 1990 – December 29, 1992	25 years, 146 days	Fernando Collor m. 1984
33	Vacant		December 29, 1992 – January 1, 1995	Vacant	Itamar Franco; Divorced
34		Ruth Cardoso; September 19, 1930 – June 24, 2008	January 1, 1995 – January 1, 2003	64 years, 104 days	Fernando H. Cardoso m. February 1953
35		Marisa Lula da Silva; April 7, 1950 – February 3, 2017	January 1, 2003 – January 1, 2011	52 years, 269 days	Lula da Silva m. May 25, 1974
36	Vacant		January 1, 2011 – August 31, 2016	Vacant	Dilma Rousseff; Divorced
37		Marcela Temer; Born May 16, 1983	August 31, 2016 – January 1, 2019	33 years, 107 days	Michel Temer m. July 26, 2003
38		Michelle Bolsonaro; Born March 22, 1982	January 1, 2019 – January 1, 2023	36 years, 285 days	Jair Bolsonaro m. November 28, 2007
39		Rosângela Lula da Silva; Born August 27, 1966	January 1, 2023 – present	56 years, 127 days	Lula da Silva m. May 18, 2022

== Other spouses of presidents of Brazil ==
Two presidents were widowed before their presidencies:

- Rodrigues Alves was married to Ana Guilhermina Rodrigues Alves from 1875 until her death in 1891.
- Humberto Castelo Branco was married to Argentina Castelo Branco from 1922 until her death in 1963.

Three presidents were widowed and remarried before their presidencies:

- Epitácio Pessoa was married to Francisca Pessoa from 1894 until her death in 1895. He was later married to Mary Pessoa from 1898 until 1942.
- Carlos Luz was married to Maria José Luz from 1920 until her death in 1924. He was later married to Graciema da Luz from 1927 until 1961.
- Luiz Inácio Lula da Silva was married to Maria de Lurdes da Silva from 1969 until her death in 1971. He was later married to Marisa Letícia from 1974 until her death in 2017. He later married Rosângela Lula da Silva in 2022.

Five presidents were divorced before their presidencies:

- Fernando Collor was married to Lilibeth Monteiro de Carvalho from 1975 to 1981.
- Itamar Franco was married to Ana Elisa Surerus from 1968 to 1978.
- Dilma Rousseff was married to Cláudio Linhares from 1967 to 1969 and to Carlos Araújo from 1969 to 2000.
- Michel Temer was married to Maria Célia de Toledo from 1969 to 1987.
- Jair Bolsonaro was married to Rogéria Nantes Braga from 1978 to 1997 and to Ana Cristina Valle from 1997 to 2007.

Three presidents remarried after their presidencies:

- Fernando Collor has been married to Caroline Collor since October 28, 2005.
- Fernando Henrique Cardoso has been married to Patrícia Kundrát since January 29, 2014.
- Luiz Inácio Lula da Silva has been married to Rosângela Lula da Silva since May 18, 2022.

== See also ==
- Second Lady of Brazil
- List of spouses of heads of state
- List of spouses of heads of government
