= Presidency of Juscelino Kubitschek =

Brazilian governmental presidency (1956–1961)

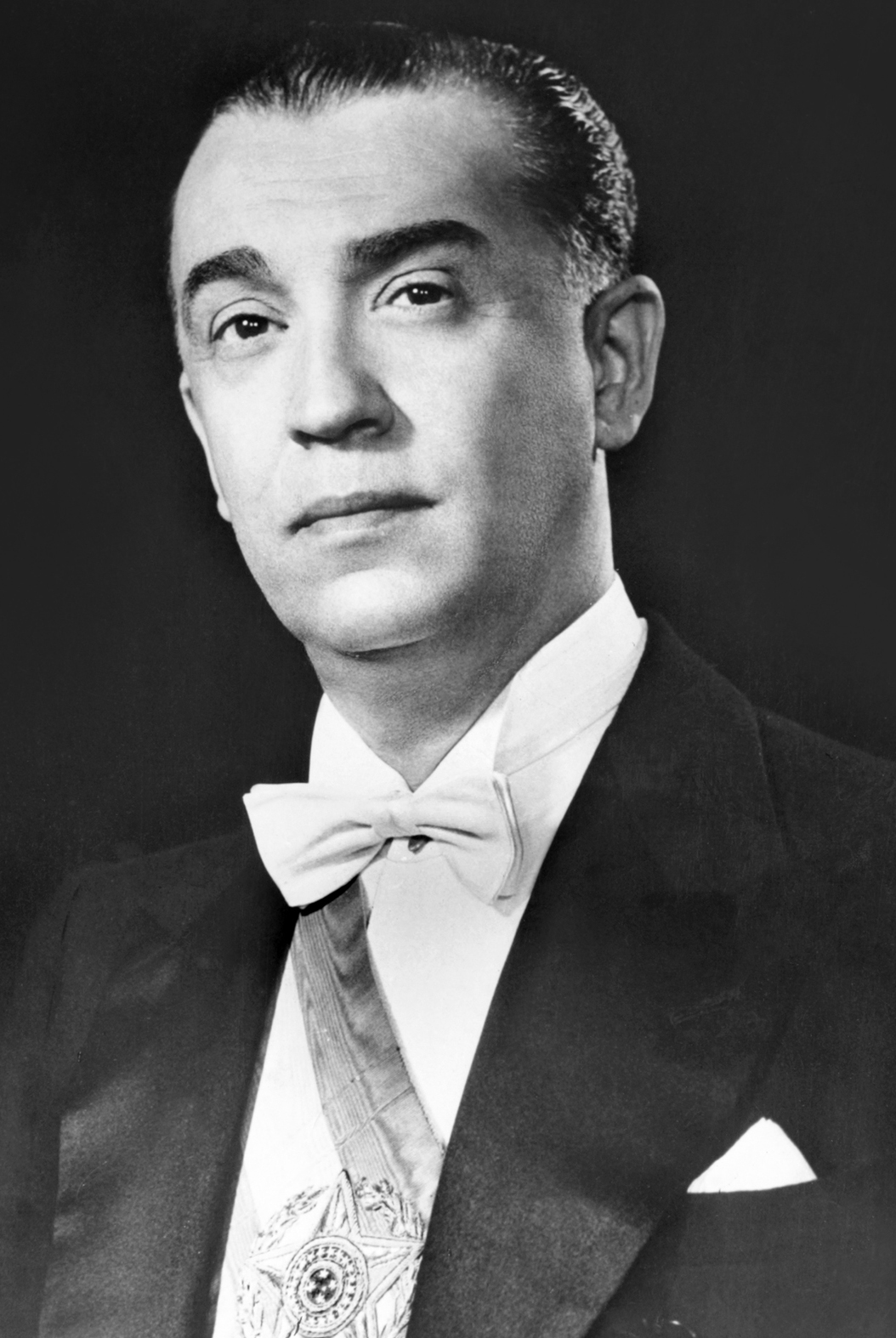
- Official portrait, 1956
- Presidency of Juscelino Kubitschek; 31 January 1956 – 31 January 1961
- Vice President: João Goulart
- Party: PSD
- Election: 1955
- Standard of the President

Juscelino Kubitschek's tenure as the 21st president of Brazil began on 31 January 1956, after he won the 1955 Brazilian presidential election, and ended on 31 January 1961, when Jânio Quadros took office.

His administration was characterized by the Plano de Metas (English: Goals Plan), which aimed to develop sectors such as energy, transport, food, basic industry and education. Under the slogan Cinquenta anos em cinco ("Fifty years in five"), his government was also responsible for building the new capital, Brasília, located in the Brazilian Central-West. In order to stimulate trade in cars and consumer goods, he introduced many foreign companies to Brazil, including the Chrysler and Ford automobile corporations through the Executive Group of the Automobile Industry.

== Context ==
=== Fourth Brazilian Republic ===
After the promulgation of a new federal constitution in 1946 until the military coup of 1964, Brazil experienced a phase known as the Populist Republic. During this period, the country achieved a great increase in economic and industrial growth, as well as rapid urbanization. However, existing social inequalities also expanded.

=== 1955 presidential election ===
During the crisis that culminated in the suicide of President Getúlio Vargas on 24 August 1954, Juscelino Kubitschek, then-governor of Minas Gerais, contributed to the formation of the new administration headed by João Café Filho, Vargas' vice-president. Prior to his death, Brazil was living a moment of political division, with the right-wing opposition National Democratic Union (UDN), high-level military officers and the mass media openly trying to depose him after allegations of setting up the assassination of the right-wing journalist Carlos Lacerda.

In February 1955, Kubitschek, a member of the pro-Vargas Social Democratic Party (PSD), announced his candidacy and built an alliance with the popular left-wing populist João Goulart of Vargas' Brazilian Labour Party. On 3 October 1955, JK was elected President of the Republic with 35.68% of the valid votes; the UDN protested, claiming that he hadn't won a majority of the votes. His inauguration was only secured thanks to the Preventive Coup, led by Marshal Lott, who deposed Carlos Luz, accused of not wanting to hand over the post to JK.

== Investiture ==
JK's inauguration ceremony was conducted under heavy security, which began at the Flamengo Park and extended to the Tiradentes Palace, then the seat of the Chamber of Deputies. Afterwards, JK and João Goulart drove in an open car to the Catete Palace, where they met the then president, Nereu Ramos, to hand over the post. There, JK made his speech. There were demonstrations by Queremistas, who supported JK, but they were mainly in favor of Getúlio Vargas and said prayers around his statue.

== Internal policy ==
=== Economy ===
Inauguration of the General Motors Factory in São José dos Campos (SP). 10 March 1959

On the second day of his administration, JK unveiled his Plano de Metas, composed of 30 objectives to be achieved during his five years in office. The goals sought to develop areas that were considered critical for the Brazilian economy, such as energy generation, transportation system and ports. Between 1955 and 1961, production in the industrial sector grew by 80%, with the steel, mechanical, electrical, communications and transport equipment industries standing out. Between 1957 and 1961, the real growth rate was 7% per year. Focused on the national development project, the process was possible due to the existence of a large domestic market, iron and steel production capacity and the willingness of foreign investment. Besides stimulating the injection of foreign capital, the government addressed the areas of transportation and energy and created an infrastructure for the expansion of the industrial park.

The JK government guided investments according to the studies and projects formulated by representatives of the United Nations Economic Commission for Latin America and the Caribbean (ECLAC) and the Brazilian Development Bank (Banco Nacional de Desenvolvimento Econômico e Social - BNDE). His economic policy achieved significant results in the industrial expansion area, but caused contradictions related to favoring the concentration of capital through the entry of multinational companies into Brazil. According to the workers, the increase in productivity resulting from technological improvement was not reflected either in prices or wages.

Imports, which aimed to supply the domestic shortage of goods, deepened the external dependence of the Brazilian economy, increasing the financial imbalance and the balance of payments deficit, which had a decisive impact on the inflation process. Lucas Lopes, the Minister of Finance, and Roberto Campos, the director of the BNDE, formulated an anti-inflationary stabilization plan and submitted it to the International Monetary Fund (IMF), which had to endorse a 300 million dollar loan from the United States. Faced with the IMF's demands to adjust the Brazilian economy, the JK government had two options: continue with the Plano de Metas or restrain the internal economy, which would satisfy the external creditors and the Brazilian supporters of the program. The debate included nationalist and liberal intellectuals, represented at the Instituto Superior de Estudos Brasileiros (Higher Institute of Brazilian Studies - ISEB). In June 1959, Kubitschek broke off negotiations with the IMF.

=== Infrastructure ===
During the Kubitschek government, the main infrastructure improvement was road transportation. In this period, investment in rail transport was reduced and investment in roads increased. Several highways helped the settlement and development of Central Brazil and the Amazon:

- Highway BR-153 (formerly BR-14), also known as the Belém-Brasília Highway;
- Régis Bittencourt Highway (formerly BR-2): connects southeastern and southern Brazil and was inaugurated in early 1961;
- Fernão Dias Highway: connects São Paulo to Belo Horizonte. The work was started by Getúlio Vargas, inaugurated by JK in 1960 and completed in 1961;
- BR-364: connects Cuiabá to Porto Velho and Rio Branco and was paved in 1983. It was the first road to connect the Central West to Rondônia and Acre. It also enabled the settlement of Rondônia, which grew from 70,000 inhabitants in 1960 to 500,000 in 1980;

The JK government founded Furnas Centrais Elétricas, responsible for generating and distributing electricity throughout Brazil, and the Duque de Caxias Refinery.

=== Brasília ===
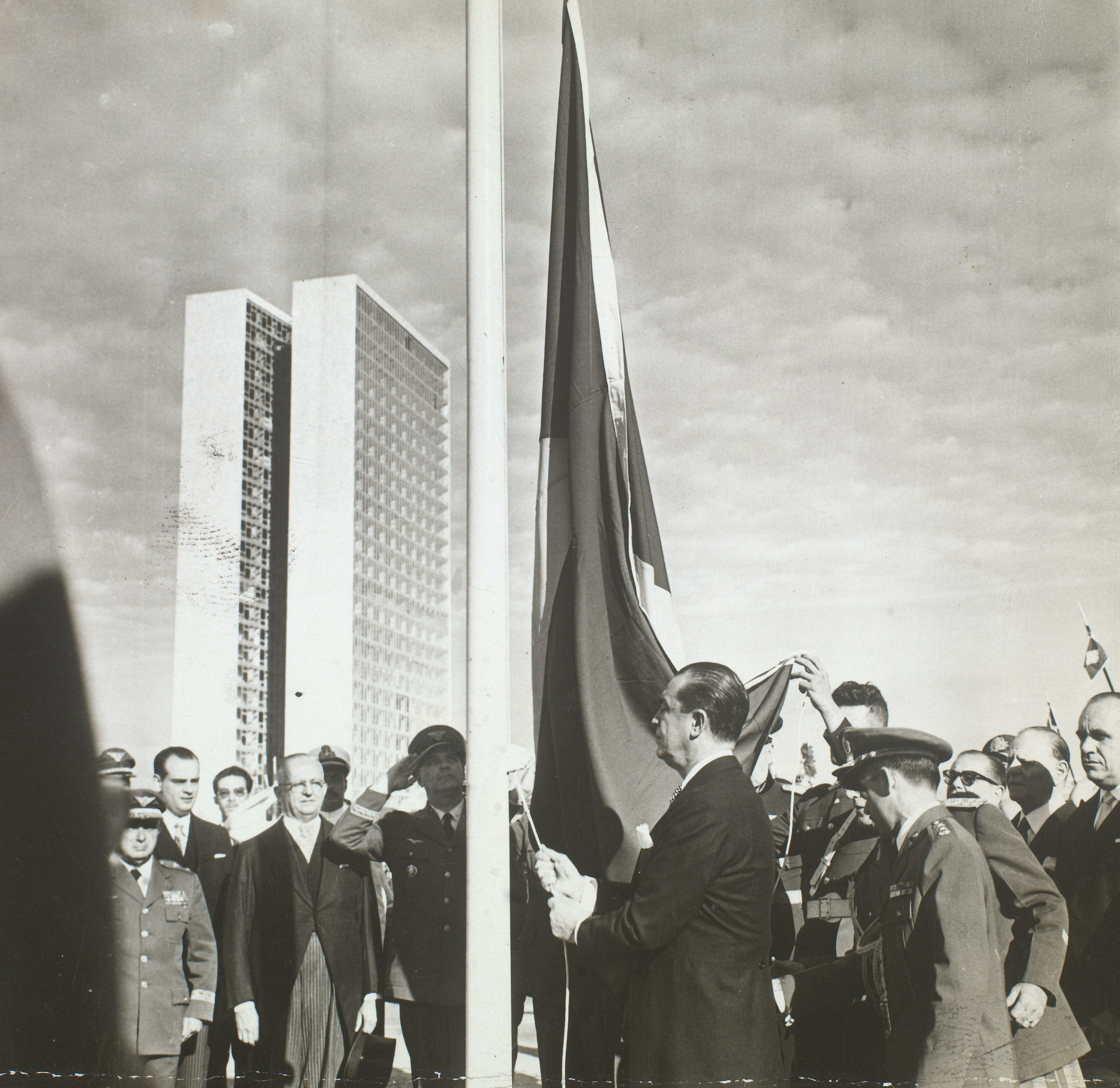
JK raising the flag at the inauguration of Brasília

The idea of building a new capital in the center of Brazil was mentioned in the constitutions of 1891, 1934 and 1946, but was postponed by all governments. In 1955, during a rally in the city of Jataí, Kubitschek set building the new capital as the main goal of his election promises. On 19 September 1956, the National Congress approved Law No. 2,874, which ordered the relocation of the Federal Capital and created the Companhia Urbanizadora da Nova Capital - Novacap. To build the city, the Brazilian government relied on northeasterners, who migrated en masse to the area in search of work and were nicknamed candangos. When the work was almost finished, they had to leave Brasília and moved to the current satellite towns.

Brasília was inaugurated on 21 April 1960, after 40 months of construction. Symbol of Brazil's development, the city was designed by architect Oscar Niemeyer and urban planner Lúcio Costa and became an example of modern architecture. On 7 December 1987, it was listed as a UNESCO World Heritage Site.

=== Relations with Congress ===
The alliance between PSD and PTB secured a great level of governability for Kubitschek. The agreement between these two parties allowed dialogue with several heterogeneous groups. In 1960, they combined to launch Marshal Lott as president.

== Foreign policy ==
=== Pan-American Operation ===
In 1958, the Brazilian government presented the United States with the proposal for the Pan-American Operation, which aimed to promote the multilateral development of the continent with US support and was later implemented through the Alliance for Progress. The implementation of the initiative was a strategy to sensitize the United States to the problem of Brazilian and regional underdevelopment.

== See also ==
- Preventative Coup of 11 November
- Rua Tonelero shooting
