= Impeachment of Carlos Luz =

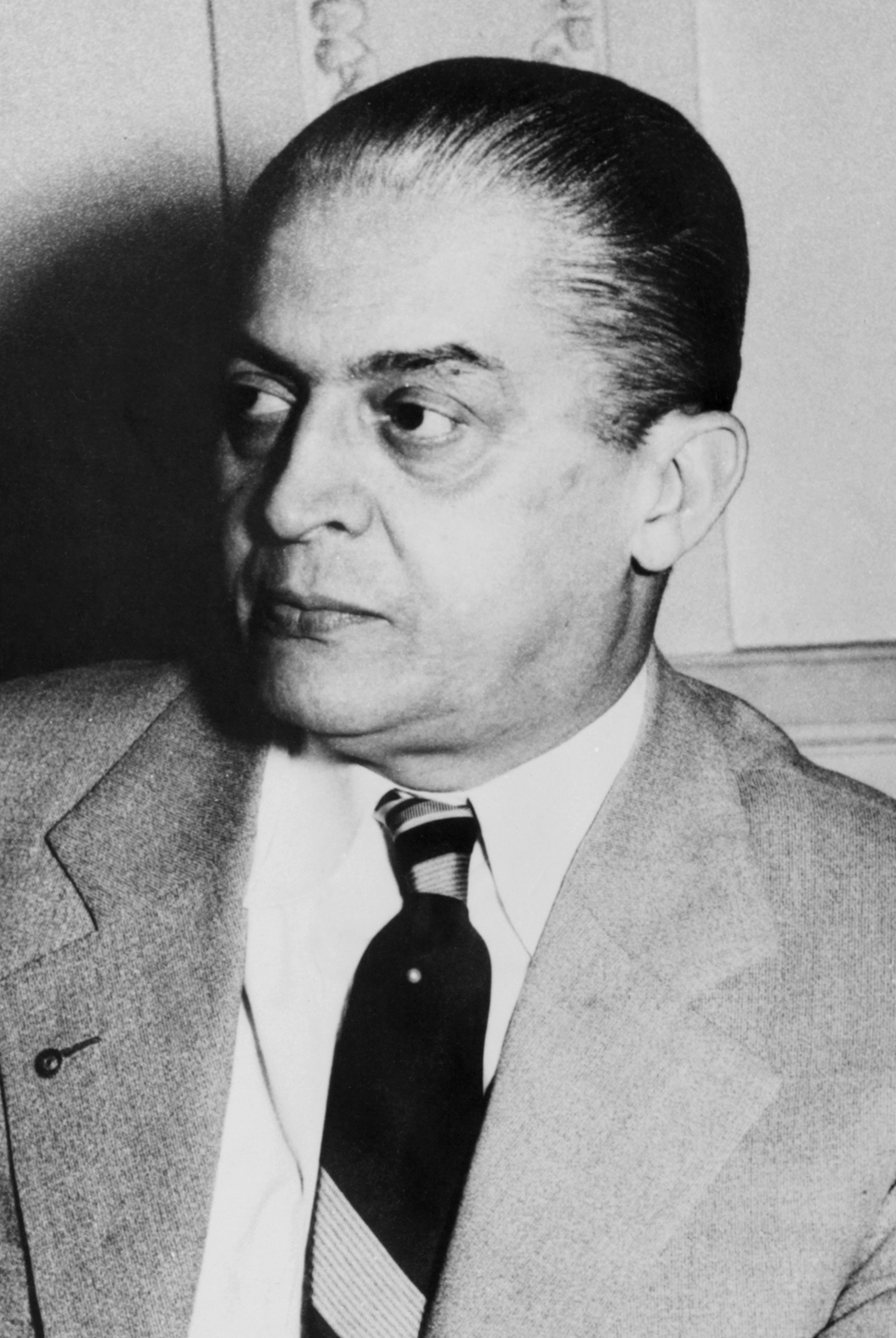
- Accused: Carlos Luz, Acting President of Brazil
- Date: 11 November 1955
- Outcome: Convicted by the Federal Senate, removed from office
- Charges: High crimes and misdemeanors
- Cause: Conspiracy to avert the inauguration of president-elect Juscelino Kubitschek

Congressional votes

Voting in the Chamber of Deputies
- Accusation: Vote to open impeachment process
- Votes in favor: 185
- Votes against: 72
- Not voting: 47
- Result: Approved

Voting in the Federal Senate
- Accusation: Vote to remove Luz from office
- Votes in favor: 43 "guilty"
- Votes against: 8 "not guilty"
- Not voting: 12
- Result: Convicted

The impeachment of Carlos Luz was a process to impeach the acting president of Brazil Carlos Luz in 1955. He assumed office as President of the Chamber of Deputies due to the medical leave of president Café Filho, Vice President of Getúlio Vargas, who committed suicide a year before.

== Political context ==
After the suicide of Getúlio Vargas and the 1955 presidential election and amid the 11 November Movement, both houses of the Brazilian congress voted to impeach and remove Carlos Luz from the office of President of the Republic. With the support of the Social Democratic Party (PSD), Carlos Luz was impeached and removed from office by the National Congress, under the accusation of conspiracy to not collaborate with the presidential transition to president-elect Juscelino Kubitschek. Luz was aboard of cruiser Almirante Tamandaré to avoid any retaliation in land and head to Santos, São Paulo, where he would build the resistance. The ship was fired upon by army artillery, more specifically from Fortress of Santa Cruz da Barra and Fortress of São João, but they didn't fight back, as requested by Carlos Luz. In this occasion, the cruiser was the Brazilian Navy most equipped ship and would cause lots of casualties in case of an attack.

== Process ==
Carlos Luz was impeached in votings 185-72 among the federal representatives and 43-8 among the senators, on 11 November. Then, Café Filho tried to return to the presidency, but was also impeached and removed from office on 21 November. Carlos Luz had the shortest term as president in Brazilian history, from 8 to 11 November 1955. Later, the presidency was assumed by the First Vice President of the Federal Senate, Nereu Ramos, on 24 November. Ramos had Congress approval to enact a state of siege, which was in force until the inauguration of the elected candidates. On 7 January 1956, the Superior Electoral Court published the official election results and, on 31 January, Juscelino Kubitschek and João Goulart inaugurated as President and Vice President of Brazil, respectively.
