= Inauguration of Juscelino Kubitschek =

Kubitschek's inauguration as president of Brazil in 1956

- Juscelino Kubitschek and João Goulart during the inauguration ceremony
- Date: January 31, 1956
- Venue: Tiradentes Palace (session) and Catete Palace (handover and speech)
- Location: Rio de Janeiro, Brazil
- Also known as: Posse de Juscelino Kubitschek
- Type: Inauguration ceremony / Presidential transition
- Participants: Juscelino Kubitschek (21st President of Brazil, assumed office); João Goulart (14th Vice President of Brazil, assumed office); José Antônio Flores da Cunha (presided over the session as President of the Chamber of Deputies)
- Outcome: Peaceful assumption of power by JK after the 1955 election, secured following the Preventative Coup of November 11, 1955; last presidential inauguration held in Rio de Janeiro

Juscelino Kubitschek and João Goulart took office as the 21st president of Brazil and the 14th vice president of Brazil, respectively, on January 31, 1956, in a ceremony held at the National Congress in Rio de Janeiro, then the capital of Brazil.

Juscelino's inauguration was the last to be held in Rio de Janeiro, as Brasília was inaugurated in 1960 and the following year was the venue for the inauguration of his successor, Jânio Quadros.

== Background ==
In a turbulent scenario, Juscelino Kubitschek assumed the presidency, with his opponents from the National Democratic Union (UDN), supported by Vice President Café Filho, seeking to remain in power. However, the Social Democratic Party (PSD) and Brazilian Labour Party (PTB) alliance thwarted the UDN's ambitions, with Kubitschek being elected in October 1955 with 36% of the votes and João Goulart winning the vice presidency.

Faced with this duo, the UDN, led by Congressman Carlos Lacerda, sought to challenge the election results, arguing that Juscelino had not been chosen by the majority of the electorate. As agreed in the Brazilian Constitution of 1946, however, this was not an electoral requirement, so an election only required one round.

In addition to Udenist politicians, the coup movement to prevent JK from taking office had the support of the conservative wing of the Army and interim president Carlos Luz, who had taken office after Café Filho stepped down for health reasons. The inauguration of Juscelino and João Goulart was only secured thanks to General Teixeira Lott's so-called Preventive Coup on November 11.

== Ceremony ==
With tight security measures in place from Flamengo Park to the Tiradentes Palace, then seat of the Chamber of Deputies, the ceremony began at 3:15 p.m. and was presided over by the president of the chamber. The presidency of the Senate was vacant, with Juscelino and João Goulart taking the oath of office and signing the Book of Inauguration.

Then, both went in an open car to the Catete Palace for then-President Nereu Ramos to hand over the office, when Ramos gave a speech saying that JK was taking over the country “at a time of great change and low expectations for the entire nation,” and then Juscelino gave his speech.

=== Speech ===
Excerpt from JK's speech:

Receiving from your hands, Mr. Chief Justice of the Superior Electoral Court, the diplomas of President and Vice President of the Republic, we experience a feeling of both joy and terrible responsibility. The joy comes from the peaceful and legal resolution of the Brazilian crisis; as for the fearful responsibility, we are all aware of the countless problems that those who will govern this country must face.

After the ministers took office, JK waved to the people from the palace balcony.

=== Demonstrations ===
During the inauguration, demonstrators from the Brazilian Communist Party (PCB) calling for the party to be legalized again and for the end of martial law were arrested. There were also demonstrations by Queremistas, who supported Juscelino, but these were mainly in favor of Getúlio Vargas, including prayers around the statue of the former president.

=== International reactions ===
- Japan: Emperor Hirohito sent a telegram with congratulations to the new president.
