= Três Corações =

- Municipality
- Municipality of Três Corações
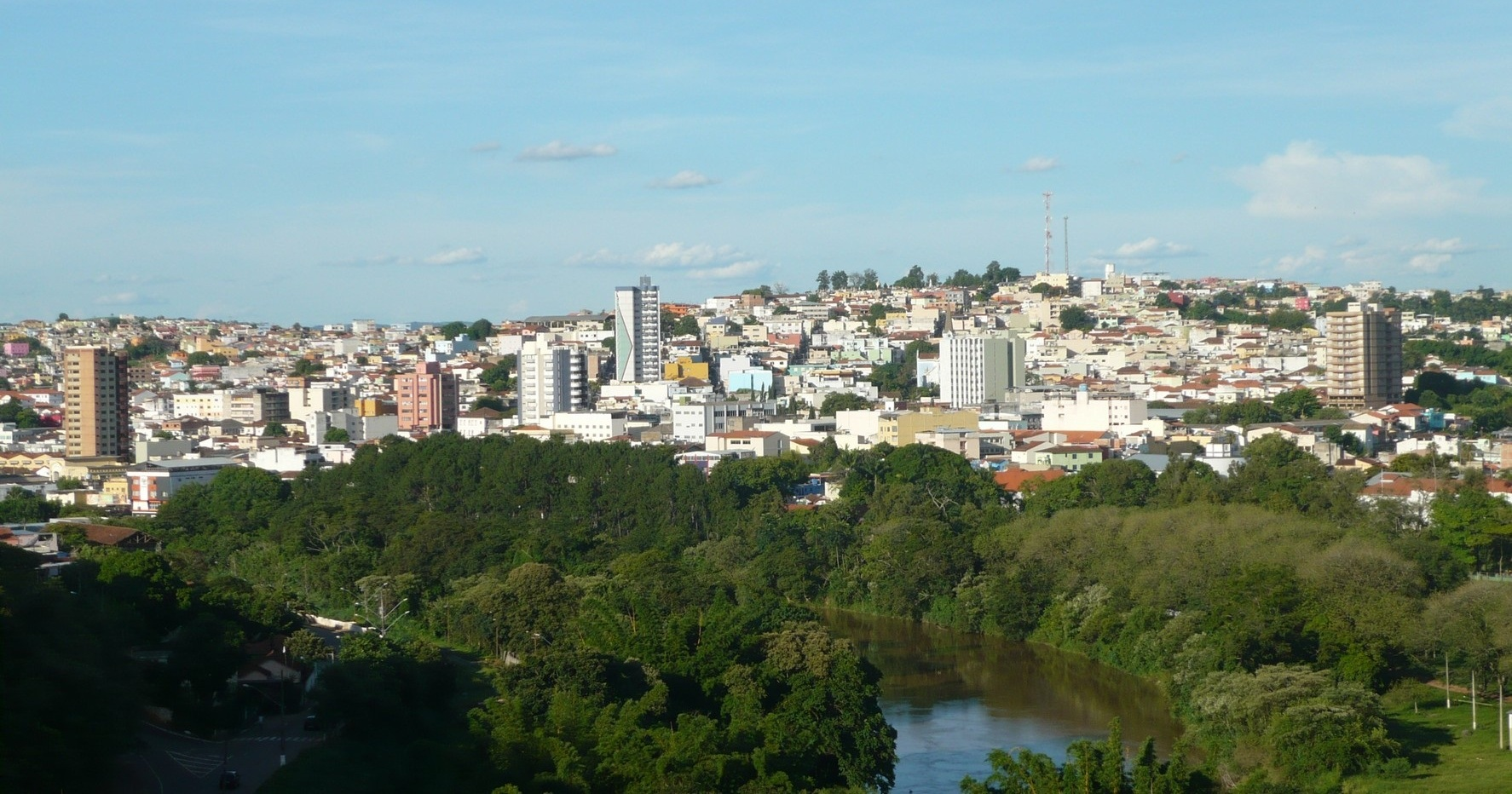
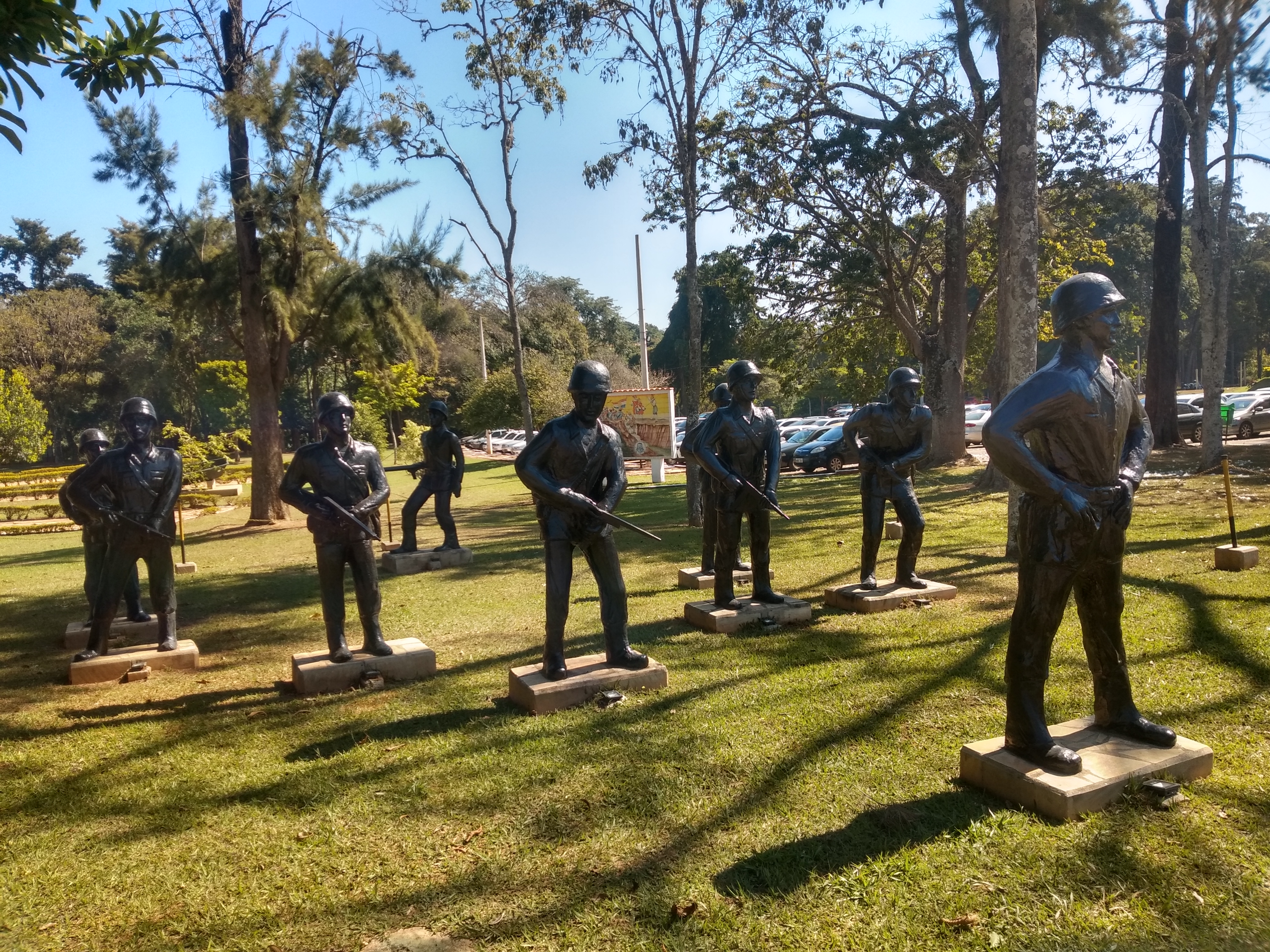
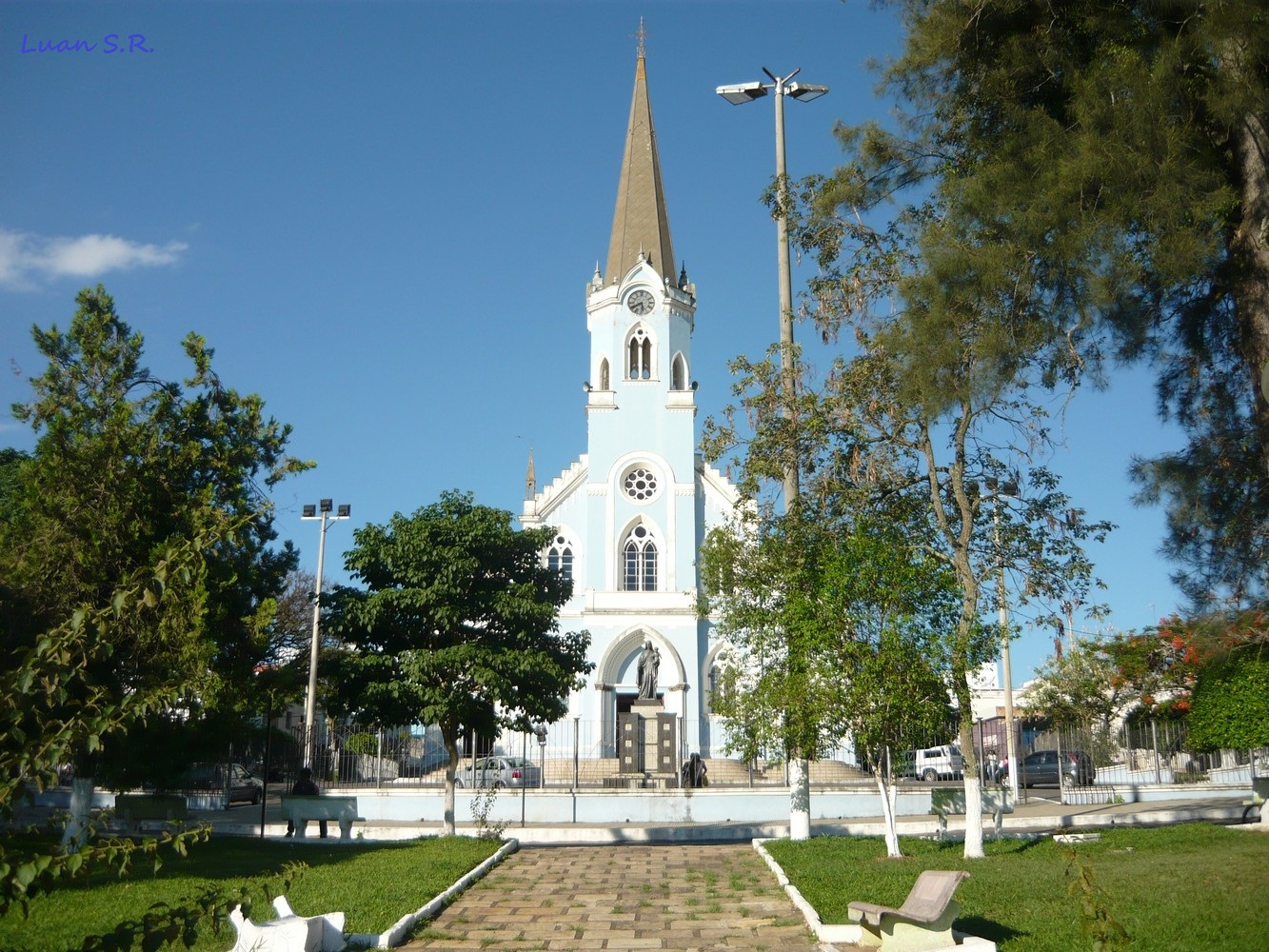
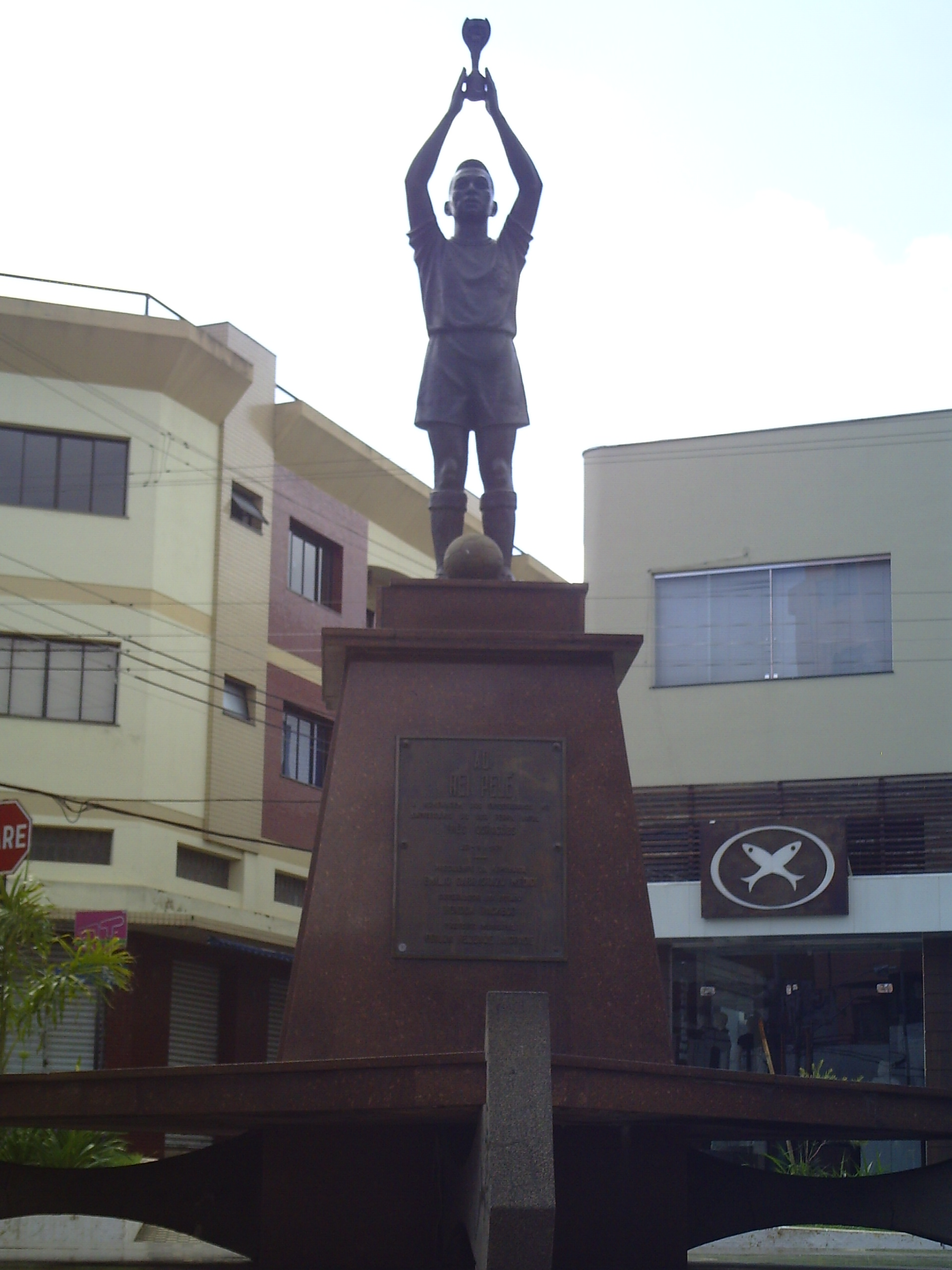
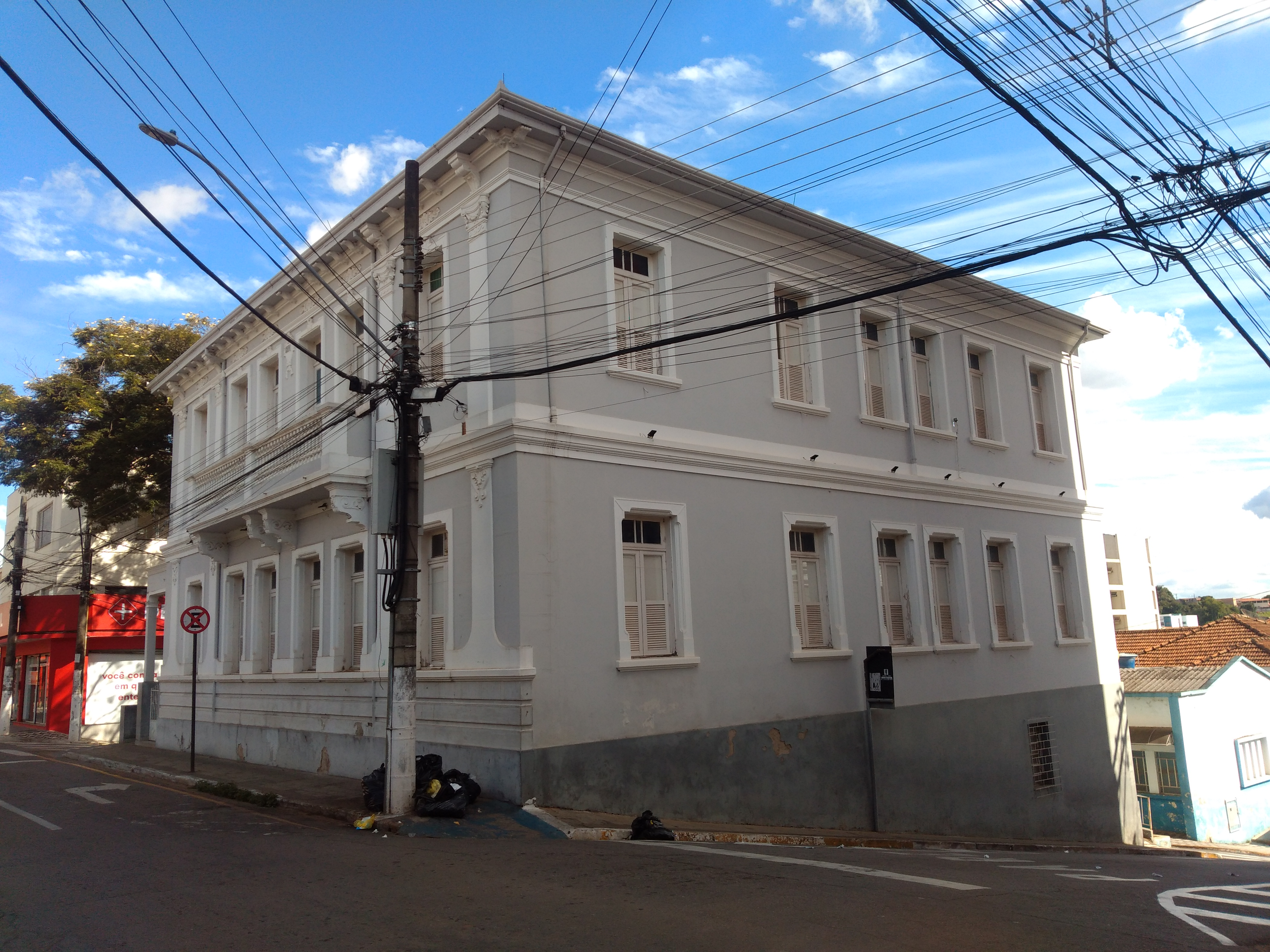
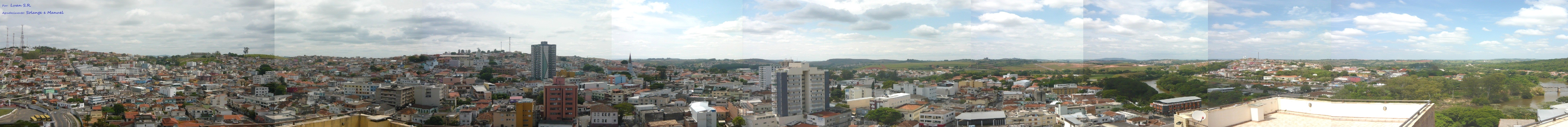

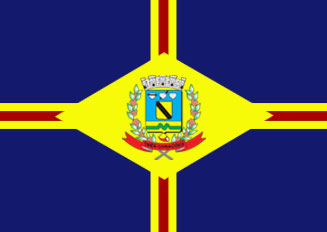
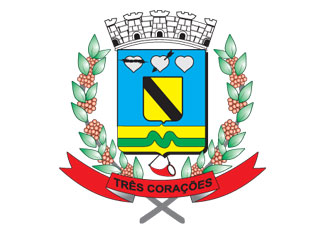
- Flag Coat of arms

- Location in Minas Gerais

- Location in Brazil
- Coordinates: 21°41′41″S 45°15′19″W
- Country: Brazil
- State: Minas Gerais
- Region: Southeast
- Intermediate Region: Varginha
- Immediate Region: Três Corações
- Settled: 1760s
- Founded: June 14th, 1832
- Incorporated: September 23rd, 1884

Government
  - Mayor: Reinaldo Vilela Paranaiba Filho (UNIÃO)

Area
  - Total: 319.707 sq mi (828.038 km^{2})
- Elevation: 2,753 ft (839 m)

Population (2020)
  - Total: 80,032
  - Density: 250.33/sq mi (96.653/km^{2})
- Time zone: UTC−3 (BRT)
- Postal code: 37410-000
- Area code: 35
- HDI (2010): 0.744 – high
- Website: Official website

Três Corações (Brazilian Portuguese: [ˈtɾe(j)s koɾaˈsõjs]) is a municipality in the south of Minas Gerais state in Brazil. As of 2020, the city population was estimated at 80,032, making it one of the largest cities in the south of Minas Gerais. The city is geographically located close to the circumcenter of the three largest metropolitan areas in Brazil (Belo Horizonte, Rio de Janeiro and São Paulo), thus making it a strategic hub for commerce. Três Corações is internationally famous for being the birthplace of football legend Pelé.

== History ==
By the year 1760, the Portuguese Tomé Martins da Costa had settled on the banks of the Verde River to explore gold. After some years he built a big farm and started the construction of the "Santíssimos Corações de Jesus, Maria e José" (Most Holy Hearts of Jesus, Mary and Joseph) chapel.

In 1764 the Minas Gerais governor, D. Luiz Lobo Diogo Silva, visited Tomé M. Costa and noticed some small houses nearby.

In 1790, Captain Domingos Dias de Barros, Tomé's son in law, built a bigger chapel on the site where the old one stood. It was opened to the public of Três Corações do Rio Verde and the Três Sacratíssimos Corações parish in 1832.

Três Corações do Rio Verde became part of the Minas Gerais Province in 1873, after the President of the province sanctioned laws establishing that the territory was part of its civil parish.

The town continued to develop civically after Emperor Pedro II and the imperial family visited it in 1884, for the inaugural of the Minas & Rio railroad. The railroad connected the town to Cruzeiro, a town in São Paulo Province. Three months following the emperor's visit, the town was emancipated and became categorized as a city.

Though formally known as Três Corações do Rio Verde, on September 7, 1923, the city became known as Três Corações.

The village has been known as Três Corações ("Three Hearts" in Portuguese) because of the name of the chapel (hearts of Jesus, Mary and Joseph).

That is the political and official history. There are two other versions as to the origin of the city's name. One is that the path through which the river flows around the city forms the shape of three hearts. The other, more poetic version, tells the story of three cowboys, who while passing through the town from Goias, came upon three women, Jacyra, Jussara, and Moema. The women captured their attention, and the cowboys fell in love with them.

The municipality is watered by the following rivers: Verde, Peixe, Palmela, Lambari, besides several streams. The great reservoir of Furnas is located to the northwest at a distance of about 40 km. The important interstate highway, the BR 381 (Rodovia Fernão Dias) is located at a distance of 8 km.

== Geography ==
=== City limits and distances ===
==== Municipal boundaries ====
- North - Varginha and Carmo da Cachoeira
- South - Conceição do Rio Verde and Cambuquira
- East - São Bento Abade and São Tomé das Letras
- West - Campanha and Monsenhor Paulo.

==== Distances to other cities ====
- Varginha: 30 km
- São Lourenço: 93 km
- Pouso Alegre: 112 km
- Juiz de Fora: 272 km
- Belo Horizonte: 287 km
- São Paulo: 295 km
- Rio de Janeiro: 360 km

=== Climate ===
Três Corações has a humid subtropical climate (Köppen Cwa) characterized by wet, warm summers and dry, cool winters.

The average monthly precipitation is 120.97 mm (4.76 in). The wettest month is December (with an average rainfall of 272.2 mm or 10.72 in) and the driest month is July (with an average rainfall of 13.1 mm or 0.52 in).

The average monthly temperature is 19.2 °C (66.6 °F). The hottest month is February (with a daily mean of 22.3 °C or 72.1 °F) and the coldest month is June (with a daily mean of 14.9 °C or 58.8 °F).

Climate data for Três Corações
Month	Jan	Feb	Mar	Apr	May	Jun	Jul	Aug	Sep	Oct	Nov	Dec	Year
Mean daily maximum °C (°F)	29.1 (84.4)	29.1 (84.4)	28.0 (82.4)	26.7 (80.1)	24.9 (76.8)	23.8 (74.8)	23.9 (75.0)	26.5 (79.7)	27.5 (81.5)	27.5 (81.5)	27.8 (82.0)	27.8 (82.0)	26.9 (80.4)
Daily mean °C (°F)	22.3 (72.1)	22.3 (72.1)	21.2 (70.2)	19.5 (67.1)	16.8 (62.2)	14.9 (58.8)	15.1 (59.2)	16.9 (62.4)	18.9 (66.0)	20.3 (68.5)	20.9 (69.6)	21.4 (70.5)	19.2 (66.6)
Mean daily minimum °C (°F)	17.5 (63.5)	17.6 (63.7)	16.5 (61.7)	14.0 (57.2)	10.6 (51.1)	8.0 (46.4)	8.2 (46.8)	9.5 (49.1)	12.3 (54.1)	14.6 (58.3)	15.8 (60.4)	16.9 (62.4)	13.5 (56.2)
Average rainfall mm (inches)	258.7 (10.19)	221.3 (8.71)	182.5 (7.19)	52.2 (2.06)	36.0 (1.42)	19.2 (0.76)	13.1 (0.52)	18.0 (0.71)	68.5 (2.70)	128.6 (5.06)	181.4 (7.14)	272.2 (10.72)	1,451.7 (57.18)
Source: INMET

== Economy ==
Cattle raising plays an important role in the economy, with both dairy and beef cattle being represented. The main agricultural products are coffee, corn, potatoes, beans, rice, and regional fruits. The main natural resource (mineral) is the São Tomé stone, which is used in civil construction.

There are light industries producing toys, highway signs, fertilizers, leather, milk products, steel wheels for cars, aluminum wheels, copper wires, and animal food among others.

== University ==
The city has one university maintained by local authorities: Universidade Vale do Rio Verde (UNINCOR), which offers courses in several areas, including dentistry.

== Sports ==
The city has a football stadium: Estádio Municipal Rei Pelé, with 3,800 people capacity. Local team Atlético de Três Corações hosts its games there. Named in honor of Pelé in 2023, it was formerly called Estádio Elias Arbex.

== Notable people ==
Três Corações is the birthplace of football legend Pelé. Among other things there is a statue prominently placed in a plaza near downtown and a street, Rua Edson Arantes do Nascimento, named in his honour (the street was given Pelé's full birth name). It is also the birthplace of Márcio Santos who plays in the Israeli Premier Basketball League.

Also the birthplace of Carlos Luz, the 19th president of Brazil and the shortest serving one, who held the office only for two days in 1955 before he was ousted by a military coup.
