= Henrique Teixeira Lott =

Brazilian military officer and politician (1954–1960)

Marshal Henrique Teixeira Lott

Minister of War
- In office 25 August 1954 – 15 February 1960
- President: Café Filho; Carlos Luz; Nereu Ramos; Juscelino Kubitschek
- Preceded by: Zenóbio da Costa
- Succeeded by: Odílio Denys

Personal details
- Born: 16 November 1894 Antônio Carlos, Minas Gerais, Brazil
- Died: 19 May 1984 (aged 89) Rio de Janeiro, Rio de Janeiro, Brazil

Military service
- Allegiance: Brazil
- Branch/service: Brazilian Army
- Rank: Marshal of the Army

Henrique Batista Duffles Teixeira Lott (16 November 1894 – 19 May 1984) was a Brazilian military and political figure.

== Personal life ==
A descendant of English and Dutch immigrants, Lott was born on 16 November 1894 in Antônio Carlos, Minas Gerais, to Henrique and Maria Lott as the first of their 10 children. He would get married April 11, 1916 in Rio de Janeiro to a woman named Laura Ferreira do Amaral. They would have 6 daughters, the most notable being Edna Lott. He would die on 19 May 1984.

== Career ==
A former military attaché in the United States, Lott was promoted to general in 1944. After President Getúlio Vargas' final downfall in 1954, his successor Café Filho appointed Lott, known for his loyalty to the constitutional government, as Minister of War. After Filho's leave of absence for health reasons on November 9, 1955 (with less than three months of his term left), President of the Chamber of Deputies Carlos Luz assumed the Presidency, as President-elect Juscelino Kubitschek and Vice President-elect João Goulart were expected to be inaugurated next January. As the military itself were bitterly divided politically, there were fears that part of it, with support of President Café Filho, would attempt to prevent elected leaders from taking office. Lott played a key role in a so-called "Revolution of November 11", ousting Filho and Luz after just three days in power, and installing the next in line, Senate First Vice President Nereu Ramos until Kubitschek and Goulart were sworn in.

Niomar Moniz Sodré Bittencourt giving Teixeira Lott (behind her) a tour on the newsroom of Correio da Manhã, 1965

Lott continued to serve as Minister under Kubitschek administration. In the 1960 presidential election, now a Marshal placed in reserve, he was the term-limited President's hand-picked choice, he ran on a platform of Leftist Nationalism, nationalizing oil, and land reform as leader of the PSD but he was defeated by Jânio Quadros in a landslide. However his running mate, Vice President Goulart, was re-elected (at the time, Brazilian President and Vice President were elected separately). And after he lost the election Lott was crucial in ensuring that the transfer of power was peaceful.

In 1962 he led a push to remove the literacy requirements to vote in Brazil, which would have increased the voting population from 15 million to 35 million.

After Quadros' surprising resignation just seven months in office, Marshal Lott sided with those supporting Goulart's right to the Presidency. After the 1964 military coup Lott mostly retired from political life, displeased with his colleagues ousting a legal government. In 1965, he attempted to run for governor of the state of Guanabara, but didn't win.

== Legacy ==
After his death in 1985, Lott was denied a military funeral, but the governor of Rio de Janeiro Leonel Brizola declared an official period of mourning.

In the 2005 film Bela Noite para Voar, he was portrayed by actor Cecil Thiré.

In the 2006 miniseries JK, Lott was played by Arthur Kohl.

== See also ==
- Preventative Coup of November 11
- Brazilian politics

Political offices
Preceded by Euclides Zenóbio da Costa	Minister of War; 1954–1960	Succeeded by Odílio Denys
