= Ana Gabriela de Campos Sales =

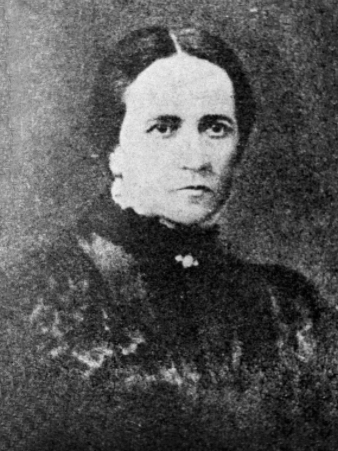

4th First Lady of Brazil
- In office 15 November 1898 – 15 November 1902
- Preceded by: Adelaide de Morais Barros
- Succeeded by: Catita Alves

First Lady of São Paulo
- In office 1 May 1896 – 31 October 1897
- Preceded by: Ambrosina Gomide
- Succeeded by: Ambrosina Gomide

Personal details
- Born: 24 January 1850 Campinas, São Paulo, Empire of Brazil
- Died: 31 July 1919 (aged 69) São Paulo, São Paulo, Brazil
- Spouse: Manuel Ferraz de Campos Sales (m. 1865; died 1913)

Ana Gabriela de Campos Sales (24 January 1850 – 31 July 1919) was the wife of Manuel Ferraz de Campos Sales, the fourth President of Brazil between 1898 and 1902. She was also the first lady of the state of São Paulo between 1896 and 1897.

== Marriage and children ==
Sales was born in Campinas, in the state of São Paulo. Ana Gabriella married her cousin-brother Manuel Ferraz de Campos Salles on 8 July 1865. They had ten children.

== First Lady of Brazil ==
In the presidential election in 1898, with Campos Salles he was elected president, serving a term from 1898 to 1902, and Ana Gabriela became the first lady of Brazil, succeeding Adelaide de Morais Barros.

=== Letter to Catita Alves ===
Before the end of her husband's term, Ana Gabriella sent a letter to Catita Alves, the eldest daughter of Rodrigues Alves (widower since 1891), Campos Salles' successor. She knew that Catita, her friend, would play the role of first lady for her father.

Alves took care of household chores until 1904, when she married her father's cabinet officer, Cesário Pereira. She was then replaced by Marieta, her sister. Marieta's successor, in turn, was Guilhermina Penna, wife of Afonso Penna.

== Death ==
Campos Sales died on 31 July 1919, aged sixty-nine. The body of the former first lady is buried next to her husband, in Cemitério da Consolação, in São Paulo.
