= Graciema da Luz =

20th First Lady of Brazil

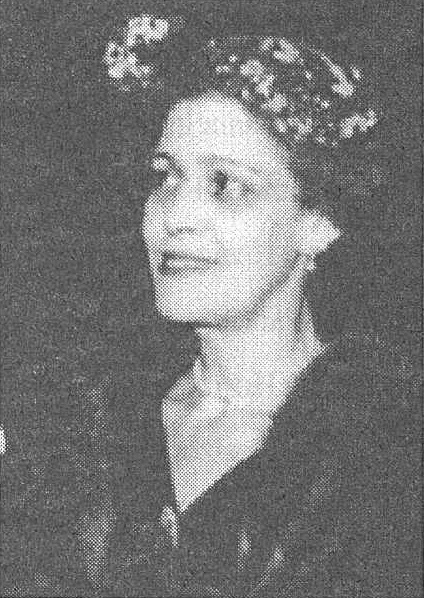

First Lady of Brazil
- In role November 8, 1955 – November 11, 1955
- President: Carlos Luz
- Preceded by: Jandira Café
- Succeeded by: Beatriz Ramos

Personal details
- Born: January 8, 1903; Leopoldina, Minas Gerais, Brazil
- Died: February 25, 1983; Rio de Janeiro, Rio de Janeiro, Brazil
- Spouse: Carlos Luz (1927-1961)

Graciema Junqueira da Luz (January 8, 1903 - February 25, 1983) was the second wife of the 19th President of Brazil, Carlos Luz, having served as the 20th First Lady of Brazil, from November 8, 1955, until November 11, 1955, the shortest presidential term in Brazilian history.
