= Mariana da Fonseca =

1st First Lady of Brazil from 1889 to 1891

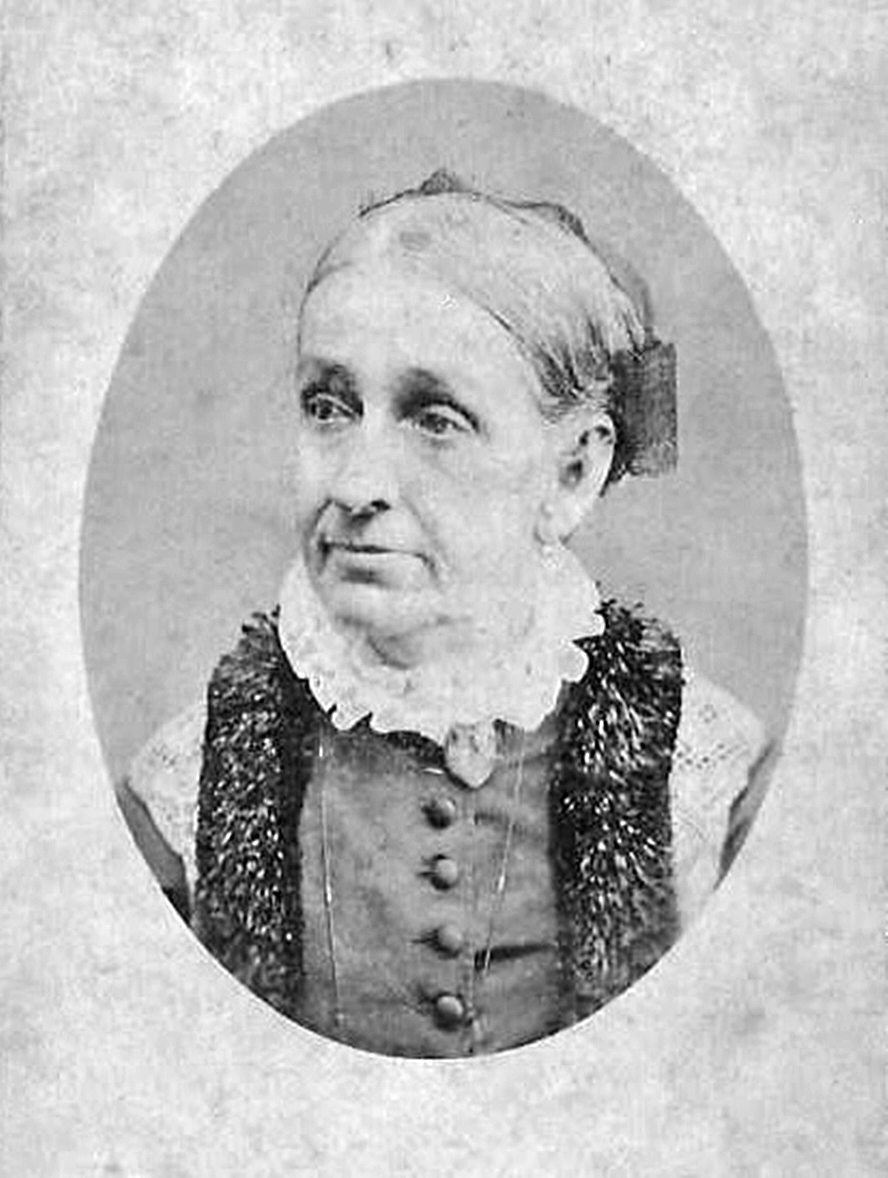

First Lady of Brazil
- In office 15 November 1889 – 23 November 1891
- President: Deodoro da Fonseca
- Preceded by: Position established
- Succeeded by: Josina Peixoto

Personal details
- Born: 10 February 1826 Rio de Janeiro, Rio de Janeiro, Empire of Brazil
- Died: 9 April 1905 (aged 79) Rio de Janeiro, Rio de Janeiro, First Brazilian Republic
- Spouse: Deodoro da Fonseca

Mariana Meireles da Fonseca (10 February 1826 – 9 April 1905) was the wife of Deodoro da Fonseca, the 1st president of Brazil, and the first woman to serve as the first lady of the country, between 1889 and 1891.

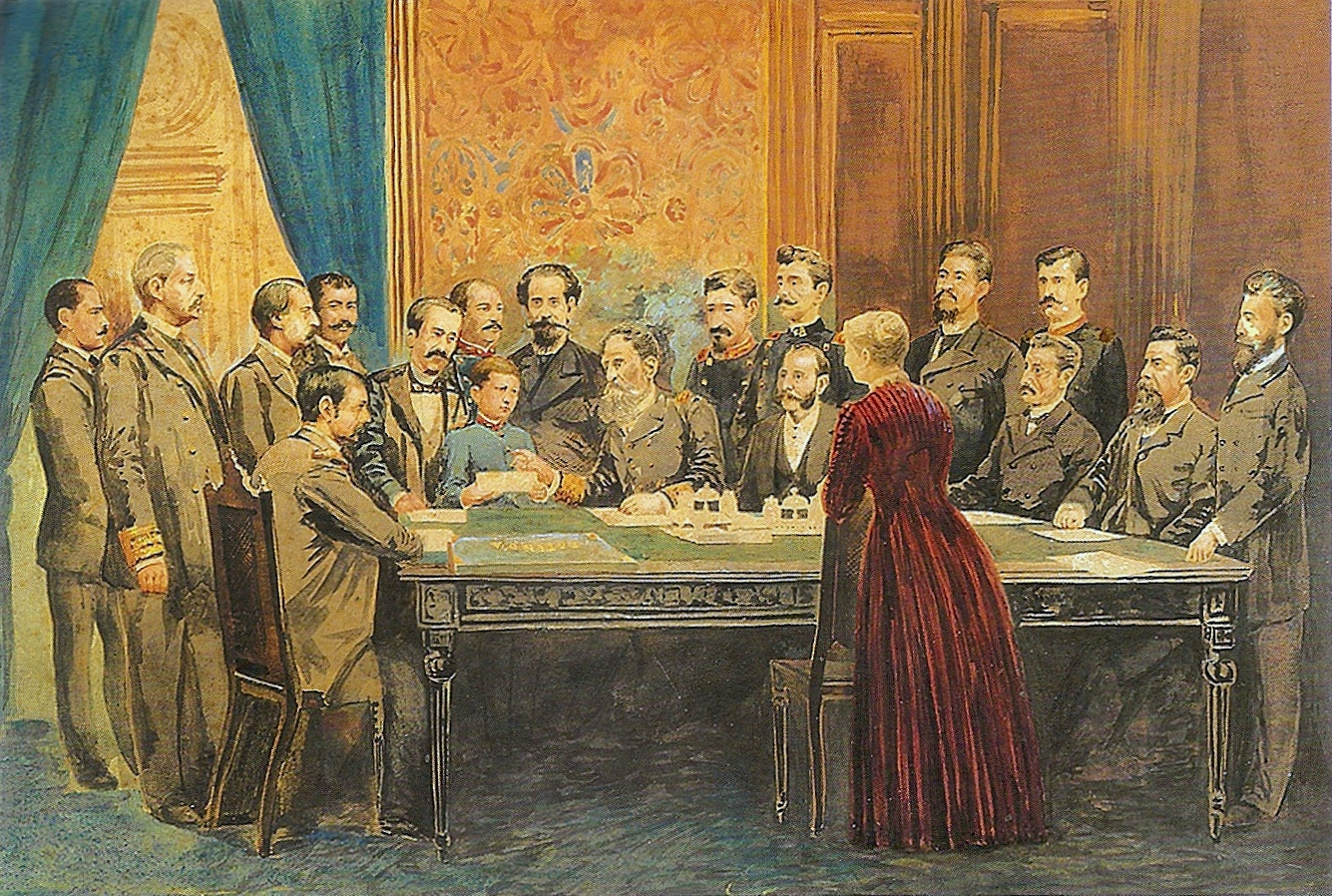
Mariana da Fonseca (backwards) in painting of Gustave Hastoy, in 1891
