= Maria Carneiro Pereira Gomes =

10th First Lady of Brazil

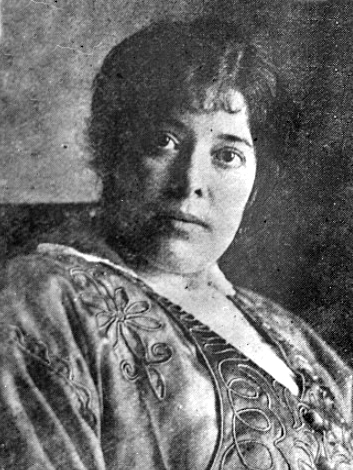
Maria Carneiro Pereira Gomes, wife of former Brazilian President Wenceslau Braz, and First Lady of Brazil between 1914 and 1918

Maria Carneiro Pereira Gomes (19 August 1875 – 14 August 1925) was the Brazilian first lady between 1914 and 1918 and the second lady between 1910 and 1914.

== Sources ==
- family
- Brasil Verdade
