= Josina Peixoto =

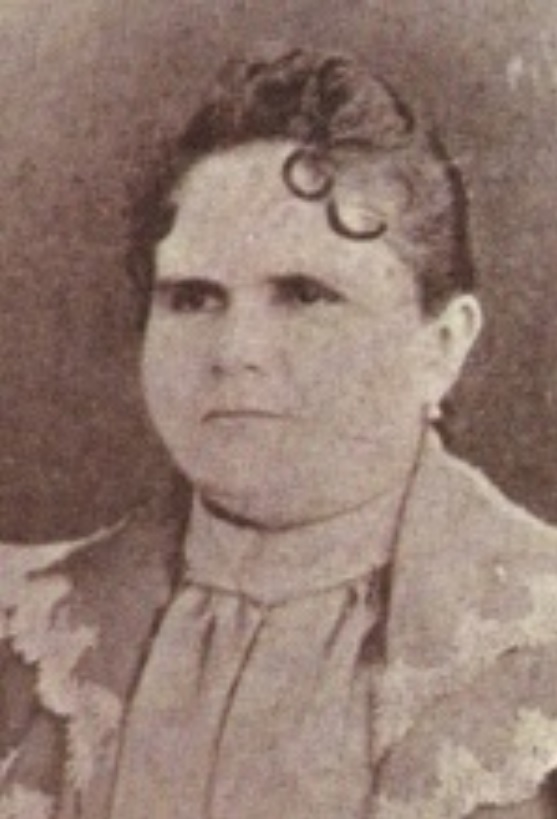

First Lady of Brazil
- In role 23 November 1891 – 14 November 1894
- President: Floriano Peixoto
- Preceded by: Mariana da Fonseca
- Succeeded by: Adelaide de Morais Barros

Second Lady of Brazil
- In office 26 February 1891 – 23 November 1891
- Vice President: Floriano Peixoto
- Preceded by: Position established
- Succeeded by: Amélia Pereira

Personal details
- Born: Josina Vieira de Araújo; 9 August 1857 Maceió, Alagoas, Empire of Brazil
- Died: 5 November 1911 (aged 54) Rio de Janeiro, Federal District, Brazil
- Spouse: Floriano Peixoto (m. 1872; died 1895)

Josina Vieira de Araújo Peixoto (9 August 1857 – 5 November 1911) was the wife of Floriano Peixoto, the 2nd President of Brazil, and the second woman to serve as first lady of the country, between 1891 and 1894. She was also the 1st second lady of Brazil from February 1891 until the resignation of Marshal Deodoro da Fonseca in November of the same year.

== Early life and family ==
Born in Maceió, capital of the state of Alagoas, intimately known as Sinhá, she was the daughter of colonel José Vieira de Araújo Peixoto and his second wife, Teresa Goufino Rosa, had four other siblings: Anna Vieira Peixoto, José de Sá Peixoto, Arthur Vieira Peixoto and José Vieira de Araújo Peixoto.

== Marriage and children ==
Josina and Floriano grew up together, as Peixoto had been adopted as her father's godson. She married her cousin-brother, Floriano Vieira Peixoto — son of her paternal uncle Manuel Vieira Peixoto — on 11 May 1872. The ceremony took place at the Itamaracá plantation, near Murici, Alagoas. The Peixotos had eight children.

== Post-presidency and death ==
A year after Floriano's term as president, Peixoto was widowed. She died in Rio de Janeiro on 5 November 1911, aged 54.
