= Adelaide de Morais Barros =

3rd First Lady of Brazil

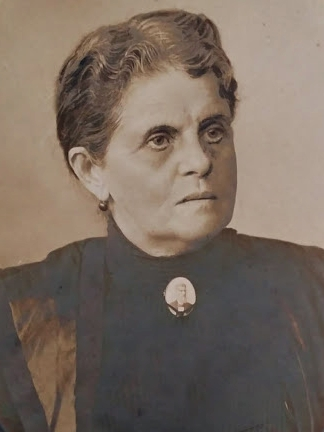

First Lady of Brazil
- In role 15 November 1894 – 15 November 1898
- President: Prudente de Morais
- Preceded by: Josina Peixoto
- Succeeded by: Anna Gabriela Campos Salles

First Lady of São Paulo
- In office 14 December 1889 – 18 October 1890
- Governor: Prudente de Morais
- Preceded by: Position established
- Succeeded by: Ana de Queirós Teles

Personal details
- Born: Adelaide Benvinda da Silva Gordo; 17 September 1848 Santos, Brazil
- Died: 8 November 1911 (Aged 63) Berlin, Germany
- Children: 9

Adelaide de Morais Barros (17 September 1848 – 8 November 1911) was the wife of Prudente de Morais, the third president of Brazil and the country's first civilian president. She was the "first lady" of the country between 1894 and 1898.

== Early life ==
Adelaide Benvinda da Silva Gordo de Morais Barros was born in Santos, in the province of São Paulo, Brazil on 17 September 1848. She was the daughter of a lieutenant colonel of the Brazilian National Guard, Antônio José da Silva Gordo and his second wife, Ana Brandina de Barros. Through her mother, Adelaide was a distant descendant of several European aristocrats and monarchs. Her father owned a large farm near Santos, and was a major coffee producer and a leading political figure. Among her half-brothers was the politician Adolfo Gordo.

== Marriage and family ==
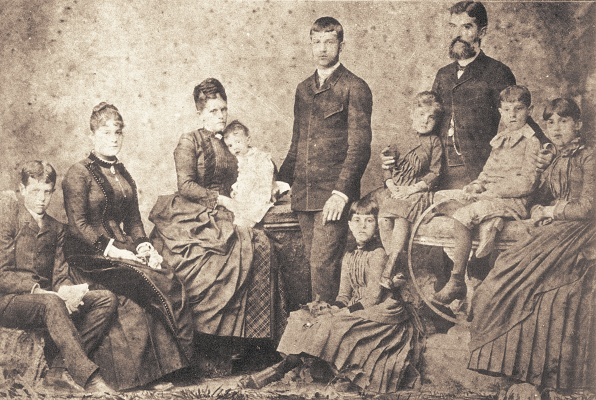
Morais family; from left to right: Prudente Jr., Maria Amélia, Adelaide, Paula, Gustavo, Carlota, Maria Teresa, Prudente de Morais, Antônio and Julia

Barros met Prudente de Morais in her home city of Piracicaba in São Paulo, where he had become a lawyer. They married in her parents' home on 28 May 1866, with the nuptials being a major social event of the time, partly because it was a double ceremony, with her twin sister, Maria Inês, marrying Manuel de Morais Barros, the brother of Prudente de Morais, who was later elected as a senator. For Morais, who was already an ambitious politician, the marriage to Adelaide provided an entrance into the political elite of São Paulo. The couple had nine children. One of the daughters died at the age of 11 and another when she was just one year old. Barros also raised the illegitimate son of Prudente de Morais, born before they were married.

Barros was described by newspapers as a "virtuous" mother and wife who was "sweet and serene". Her husband became president on 15 November 1894. Prudente de Morais ended the so-called "Republic of the Sword" and moved fellow coffee producers into a central position of power in the country. As did others in her family, Barros became friendly with the American Methodist missionary Martha Watts, who founded, among other institutions, the Colégio Piracicabano, where the children of Barros studied.

== Death ==
Her husband died in December 1902. Her own poor health led her to seek medical treatment in Berlin, Germany, where she died on 8 November 1911. Her body was returned to Brazil and buried in the Saudade Cemetery of Piracicaba.
