= Preventative Coup of November 11 =

1955 Brazilian coup

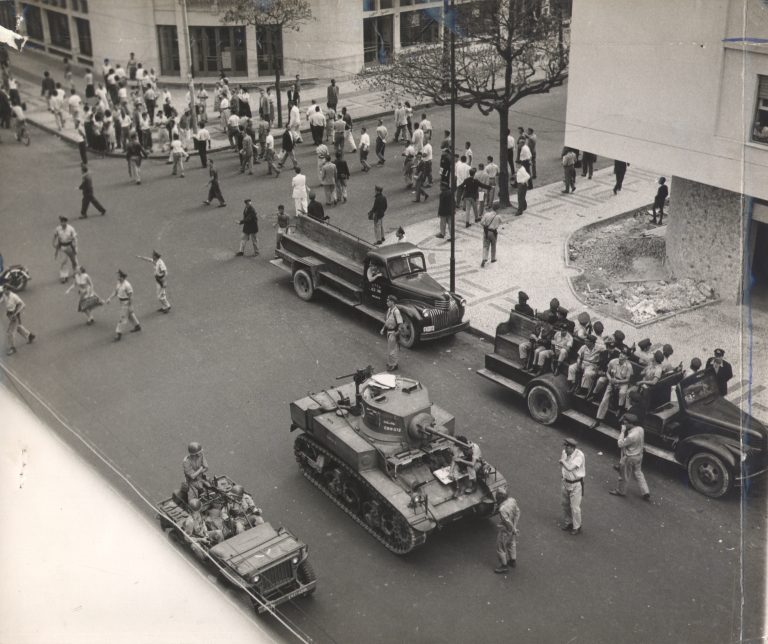
- Brazilian army waiting outside of Café Filho's residence to prevent him from reassuming the role of president
Date	10 – 11 November 1955
Location	Brazil
Result	Carlos Luz removed from office, Nereu Ramos installed as president

Belligerents
(Brazil) Brazilian Armed Forces	(Brazil) Luz cabinet

Commanders and leaders
(Brazil) Henrique Teixeira Lott (Brazil) Nereu Ramos (Brazil) Juscelino Kubitschek	(Brazil) Carlos Luz (Brazil) Café Filho

The Preventative Coup of November 11, sometimes called the 1955 Brazilian coup d'état or referred to as an "anti-coup" or a "counter-coup" (Portuguese: Novembrada, Movimento de 11 de Novembro, Contragolpe, Golpe Preventivo do Marechal Lott), was a series of military and political events led by Henrique Teixeira Lott that resulted in Nereu Ramos assuming the presidency of Brazil until being peacefully succeeded by Juscelino Kubitschek a few months later. The bloodless coup removed Carlos Luz from the presidency because he was suspected of plotting to prevent Kubitschek from taking office. As a result of the tensions, Brazil had three presidents in the span of a single week.

== Background ==
Henrique Teixeira Lott in 1955

The seeds of the coup began in August 1954 when associates of then-president Getúlio Vargas tried to assassinate opposition journalist Carlos Lacerda. The Brazilian Army pressured the president to leave office; in response, on August 24, 1954, Vargas killed himself. Riots broke out in support of the now-dead president, and vice-president Café Filho assumed the presidency. The Minister of War Euclides Zenóbio da Costa, who had been part of the effort to remove Vargas, resigned and to replace him Café Filho appointed the relatively unknown and apolitical Henrique Teixeira Lott.

The next presidential election was scheduled for October 3, 1955, and Juscelino Kubitschek, governor of Minas Gerais, announced his intention to run. Military leaders, including Lott, had been hoping for a single national unity candidate to run and wrote a secret memorandum to Café Filho encouraging him to find a unifying presidential candidate. The memorandum began to leak to the public and Kubitschek took this as a sign that the military opposed his candidacy. Unable to find a suitable candidate, General Juarez Távora, the primary author of the memorandum, eventually decided to run against Kubitschek while Café Filho promised to remain neutral.

As the campaign progressed rumors spread that Kubitschek was being supported by communists. Indeed, Luis Carlos Prestes, the wanted head of the banned Brazilian Communist Party, had been encouraging his members to vote for Kubitschek in the hopes that he would legalize their banned party. Kubitschek, however, said he had no intention to legalize the communist party.

The votes in the election were split four ways with no candidate receiving a majority. Kubitschek was declared the victor, but his opponents called the results into question. They claimed that candidates required a majority of the votes to win and that the votes by known communists for Kubitschek should be discounted. However, the Superior Electoral Tribunal had previously ruled that a candidate need not get a majority of votes to win the election. Café Filho insisted that he would ignore calls to undo the results of the election.

On November 1, Colonel Jurandir Mamede gave a public speech calling for the election results to be overturned. This outraged Lott, but he did not have the direct authority to discipline the Colonel. On November 2, Café Filho, who had had a heart attack years earlier, fell ill with cardiovascular problems. Still unwell on November 8, Café Filho transferred power to the President of the Chamber of Deputies, Carlos Luz. Carlos Luz had been an outspoken critic of Kubitschek and it was believed that he might prevent Kubitschek from taking office. Lott demanded that Café Filho and, later, Luz punish Mamede and threatened to resign. The media magnified the conflict between the two and made it difficult for either side to compromise. On November 10, Luz concluded that he would not punish Mamede and Lott resigned in protest effective the next day.

== The "anti-coup" ==
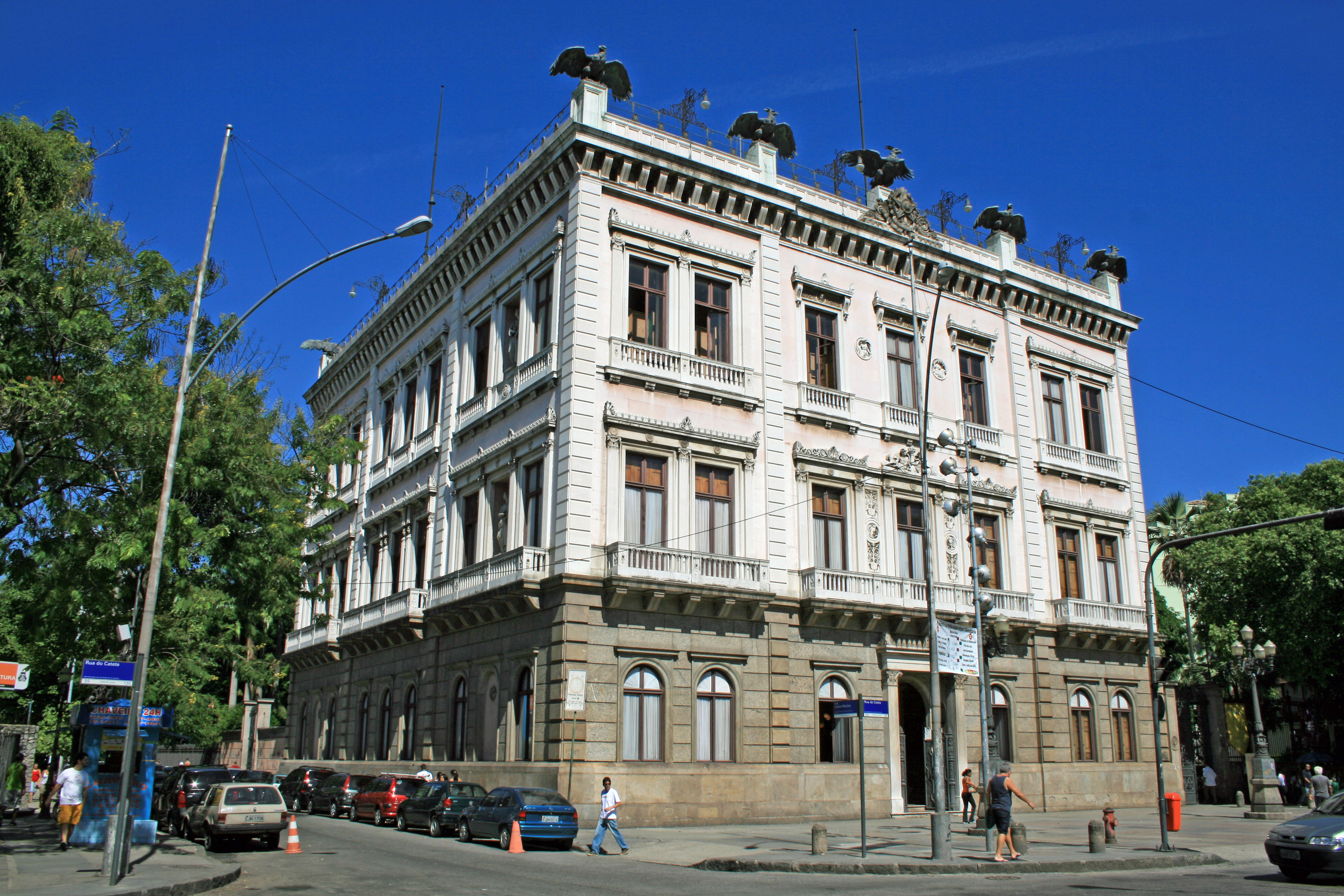
The Catete Palace was the seat of the Federal Government of Brazil at the time of the coup

Late on November 10, Lott met with other army leaders of the country including General Odylio Denys. They debated how to respond to Lott's removal as minister and decided that Denys would lead the army to seize key points in the country. A few hours later, early on November 11, Lott changed his mind and decided that instead he would lead the movement. He ordered troops to take control of police buildings, telegraph operations and Catete Palace.

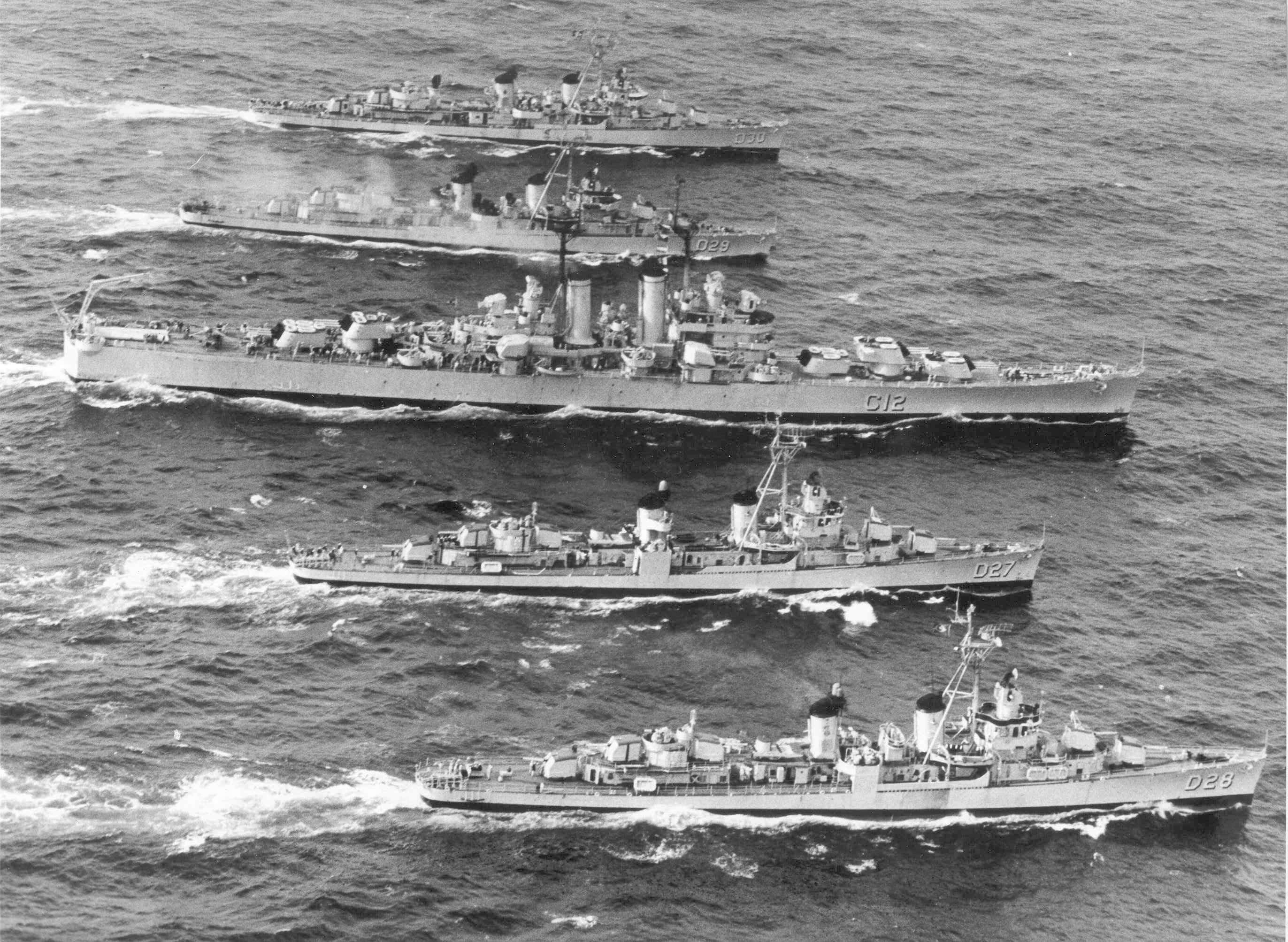
The Almirante Tamandaré shown flanked by four smaller ships

Seeing signs of a coming coup, Luz left for the Navy Ministry where the Brazilian Air Force and Navy announced they were still supporting Luz. Luz then fled to the cruiser Almirante Tamandaré which sets sail for island port city of Santos, São Paulo where Luz hoped to organize resistance. As the Almirante Tamandaré moved to exit Guanabara Bay a nearby fort indicated by flag it would not be allowed to proceed. The cruiser ignored the warning and the nearby forts opened fire, but none of the shots connected. Carlos Luz ordered the Almirante Tamandaré not to return fire due to the possibility of civilian casualties.

In the afternoon of November 11, the Chamber of Deputies and Senate were convened and voted to instate Speaker of the Senate Nereu Ramos as the new president.

By the morning of November 12, it became clear that forces friendly to Lott held the city of Santos and that they would not allow the Almirante Tamandaré to land. Defeated, Luz ordered the ship to return to Rio. On his arrival, Luz was met by Lott's army and was forced to promise to resign the presidency before he disembarked. Luz had been president for just three days. Meanwhile, Café Filho, was still in the hospital. He learned of the coup and considered resigning, but, after counterproductive conversations with Lott, he decided to wait to hear his doctors' evaluation on his health. On November 21, Café Filho's doctors pronounced him healthy to return to work and so Café Filho issued a statement proclaiming himself to be president once again. However, as he returned to the capital the military was mobilized once again. The army surrounded Café Filho's apartment and the presidential palace effectively placing him under house arrest. Soon after Congress reconvened and voted to remove Café Filho from office.

After the vote, Ramos asked Congress to declare a nationwide "state of siege" which passed and was later extended until Ramos left office. Petitions asking Brazil's Supreme Court to intervene were declined because the country was now in a "state of siege".

== Resolution ==
Ramos continued to hold the presidency until a few months later when Kubitschek took office in January 1956. The supporters of Luz's brief presidency were never seriously punished although Mamede was briefly arrested and then later assigned to a remote army recruitment post. Café Filho maintained that he had never planned to prevent Kubitschek from taking office.
