= Carlos Luz =

President of Brazil in 1955

His Excellency Carlos Luz
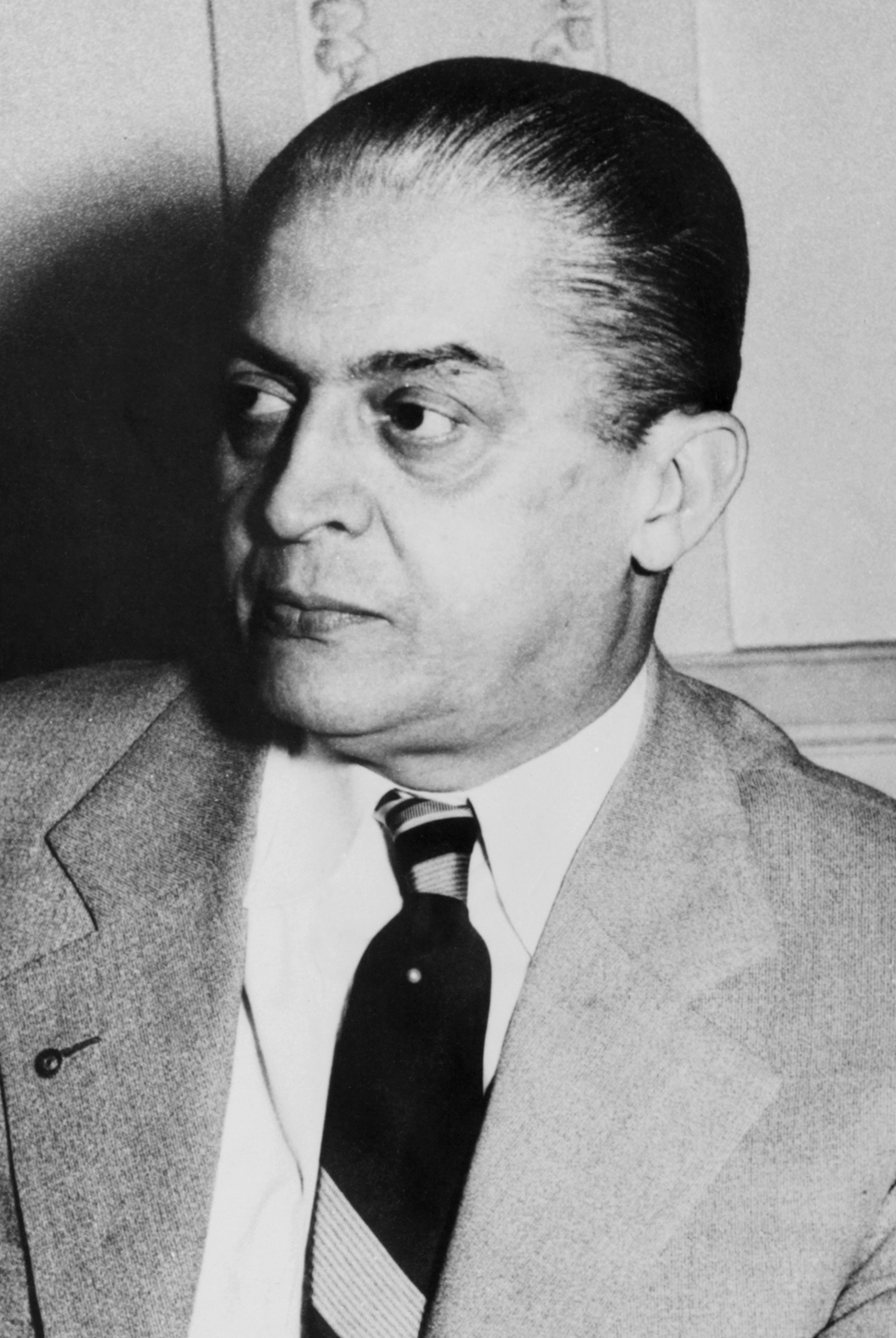

19th President of Brazil
- In office 8 November 1955 – 11 November 1955
- Vice President: None
- Preceded by: Café Filho
- Succeeded by: Nereu Ramos

President of the Chamber of Deputies
- In office 3 February 1955 – 14 November 1955
- Preceded by: Nereu Ramos
- Succeeded by: Flores da Cunha
Executive offices
1946–1946	Minister of Justice and Internal Affairs
1933–1935	Secretary of the Interior of Minas Gerais
1932–1933	Secretary of Agriculture, Transport and Public Works of Minas Gerais
1923–1932	Mayor of Leopoldina
Legislative offices
1960–1961	Federal Deputy for Minas Gerais
1955–1960	Federal Deputy for Minas Gerais
1947–1955	Federal Deputy for Minas Gerais
1935–1937	Federal Deputy for Minas Gerais
Bureaucratic offices
1939–1946	Chair of Caixa Econômica Federal

Personal details
- Born: 4 August 1894 Três Corações, Minas Gerais, Brazil
- Died: 9 February 1961 (aged 66) Rio de Janeiro, Guanabara, Brazil
- Party: PSD
- Spouse(s): Maria José Dantas (died); Graciema Junqueira
- Children: 2
- Education: Federal University of Minas Gerais

Carlos Coimbra da Luz (Portuguese: [ˈkaʁlus koˈĩbrɐ da ˈlus]; 4 August 1894 – 9 February 1961) was a Brazilian politician, lawyer, teacher and journalist who served as acting president of Brazil from November 8 to November 11, 1955. He is the shortest serving president of Brazil.

After the political crisis following the Getúlio Vargas suicide in 1954, Carlos Luz was the second of three presidents who ruled Brazil in a brief period of 16 months. At the time of President Café Filho's alleged illness in 1955 he was the president of the Chamber of Deputies, and so the next in the line of succession to the presidency, since Filho had been the vice president under Vargas. Luz headed the government only three days in November 1955 and was replaced, as part of the 1955 Brazilian coup d'état, by the vice-president of the Senate Nereu Ramos on the orders of the Minister of Defence Henrique Teixeira Lott over his fear that Luz might support a plot to prevent President-elect Juscelino Kubitschek from taking office in January 1956. Luz was removed by Congress, under pressure by the military, declaring him unable to fulfill his duties.

Luz was married to his first wife, Maria José Dantas Luz, from 1920 until her death in 1924. They had two children together. Later, Luz remained married to Graciema da Luz until his death in Rio de Janeiro in February 1961.

Political offices
Preceded by Café Filho	President of Brazil; 1955	Succeeded by Nereu Ramos
