= Café Filho =

President of Brazil from 1954 to 1955

His Excellency Café Filho: GCTE
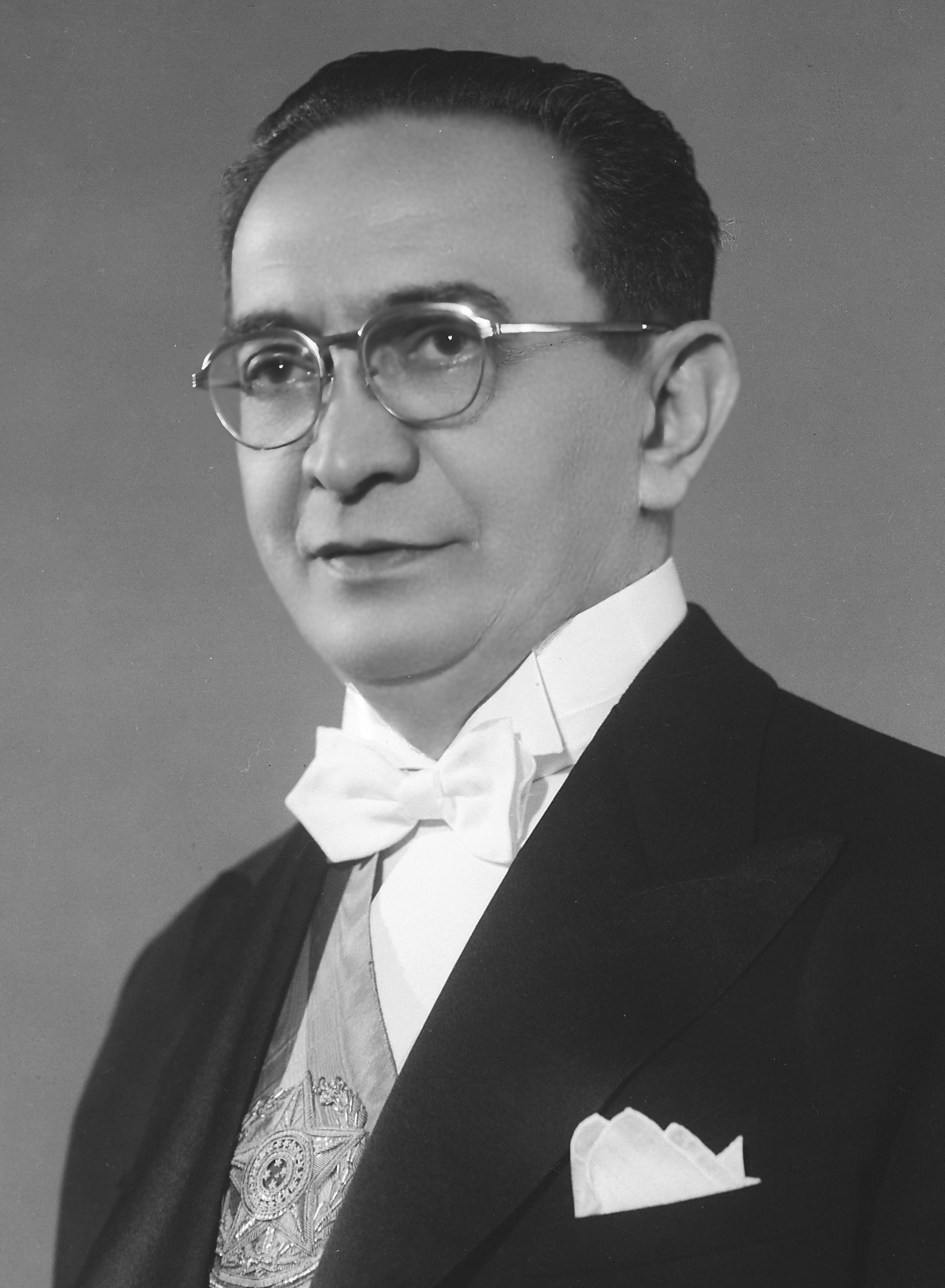
- Official portrait, 1954

18th President of Brazil
- In office 24 August 1954 – 8 November 1955^{[nb]}
- Vice President: None
- Preceded by: Getúlio Vargas
- Succeeded by: Carlos Luz

13th Vice President of Brazil
- In office 31 January 1951 – 3 September 1954
- President: Getúlio Vargas
- Preceded by: Nereu Ramos
- Succeeded by: João Goulart

Member of the Chamber of Deputies
- In office 5 February 1946 – 31 January 1951
- Constituency: Rio Grande do Norte
- In office 2 May 1935 – 10 November 1937
- Constituency: Rio Grande do Norte

Personal details
- Born: 3 February 1899 Natal, Rio Grande do Norte, First Brazilian Republic
- Died: 20 February 1970 (aged 71) Rio de Janeiro, Guanabara, Fifth Brazilian Republic
- Party: PSN (1933–1937); PSP (1946–1965)
- Spouse: Jandira Fernandes de Oliveira (m. 1921)
- Children: 1
- Profession: Journalist; lawyer
- n.b. Acting president between 24 August 1954 and 3 September 1954. On leave of absence between 3 November 1955 and 21 November 1955. Impeached by Congress on 22 November 1955.

João Fernandes Campos Café Filho (Note: English: /ʒuˈaʊn kæˈfeɪ ˈfiːljoʊ/, Brazilian Portuguese: [ʒuˈɐ̃w̃ feʁˈnɐ̃dʒis ˈkɐ̃pus kaˈfɛ ˈfiʎu].) (3 February 1899 – 20 February 1970) was a Brazilian politician who served as the 18th president of Brazil, taking office upon the suicide of President Getúlio Vargas. He was the first president born in a republican Brazil and the first Protestant to occupy the position.

== Biography ==
=== Early life and career ===
Café Filho was born in Natal, Rio Grande do Norte, 3 February 1899. He was the founder of the Jornal do Norte (1921), editor of the O Correio de Bezerros in the city of Bezerros, Pernambuco (1923), and director of the newspaper A Noite (1925), writing in the latter, articles in which he asked soldiers, corporals and young officers to refuse to fight the so-called "Coluna Prestes", which resulted in his conviction to three months in prison. He then escaped to Bahia in 1927, under the alias Senílson Pessoa Cavalcanti, but eventually returned to Natal, where he surrendered. In 1923, he ran unsuccessfully for councilman of Natal.

He joined the Liberal Alliance, and was one of the founders, in 1933, of the Social Nationalist Party of Rio Grande do Norte (PSN). Café Filho was elected federal deputy (1935–1937) and stood out for the defense of constitutional liberties. Threatened with arrest, he sought asylum in Argentina, returning to Brazil in 1938. He founded, along with Ademar de Barros, the Progressive Republican Party (PRP), for which he was elected federal deputy again (1946–1950). He was elected vice president by a coalition of parties that merged under the Social Progressive Party (PSP). As vice president, he also served as the president of the Senate. He took office as president following the suicide of incumbent Getúlio Vargas, 24 August 1954.

=== Presidency ===
After taking over as president, Café Filho appointed to his new cabinet minister of finance the economist Eugenio Gudin, supporter of a more orthodox economic policy, who sought to stabilize the economy and combat inflation. The Minister adopted key measures to contain credit and cutting public expenditure, seeking thereby to reduce the public concerned deficit in its assessment of the inflationary process. During the Café Filho government, the single tax on electricity was instituted, generating the Federal Electrification Fund, as well as the withholding tax on income from the labor wage. Notable in his administration was the creation of the Committee on Location of the New Federal Capital, and the inauguration, in January 1955, of the Paulo Afonso hydroelectric plant. Café Filho encouraged the inflow of foreign capital in the country, which would influence the process of industrialization that followed.

Temporarily removed from the presidency on 3 November 1955, due to a cardiovascular disorder, on November 8 he was replaced by Carlos Luz, the president of the Chamber of Deputies. Recovered, Café Filho tried to reassume presidential powers, but, as part of the 1955 Brazilian coup d'état, his removal was approved by the Congress on 22 November 1955 and confirmed by the Supreme Court in December.

His removal through impeachment, with the congress declaring him unable to discharge his duties, came after military pressure.

=== Post-presidency ===
After the presidency, Café Filho was appointed Councillor of the Court of Accounts of Guanabara (1961–1970).

He died in Rio de Janeiro on 20 February 1970.

== Honours ==
=== Foreign Honours ===
- Grand Cross of the Order of the Tower and Sword, Portugal (20 September 1951)
- Grand Cross of the Sash of the Three Orders, Portugal (22 April 1955)

== Notes ==
Political offices
Preceded by Nereu Ramos	Vice President of Brazil; 1951–1954	Succeeded by João Goulart
Preceded by Getúlio Vargas	President of Brazil; 1954–1955	Succeeded by Carlos Luz (acting)
