= Nereu Ramos =

President of Brazil from 1955 to 1956

His Excellency Nereu Ramos
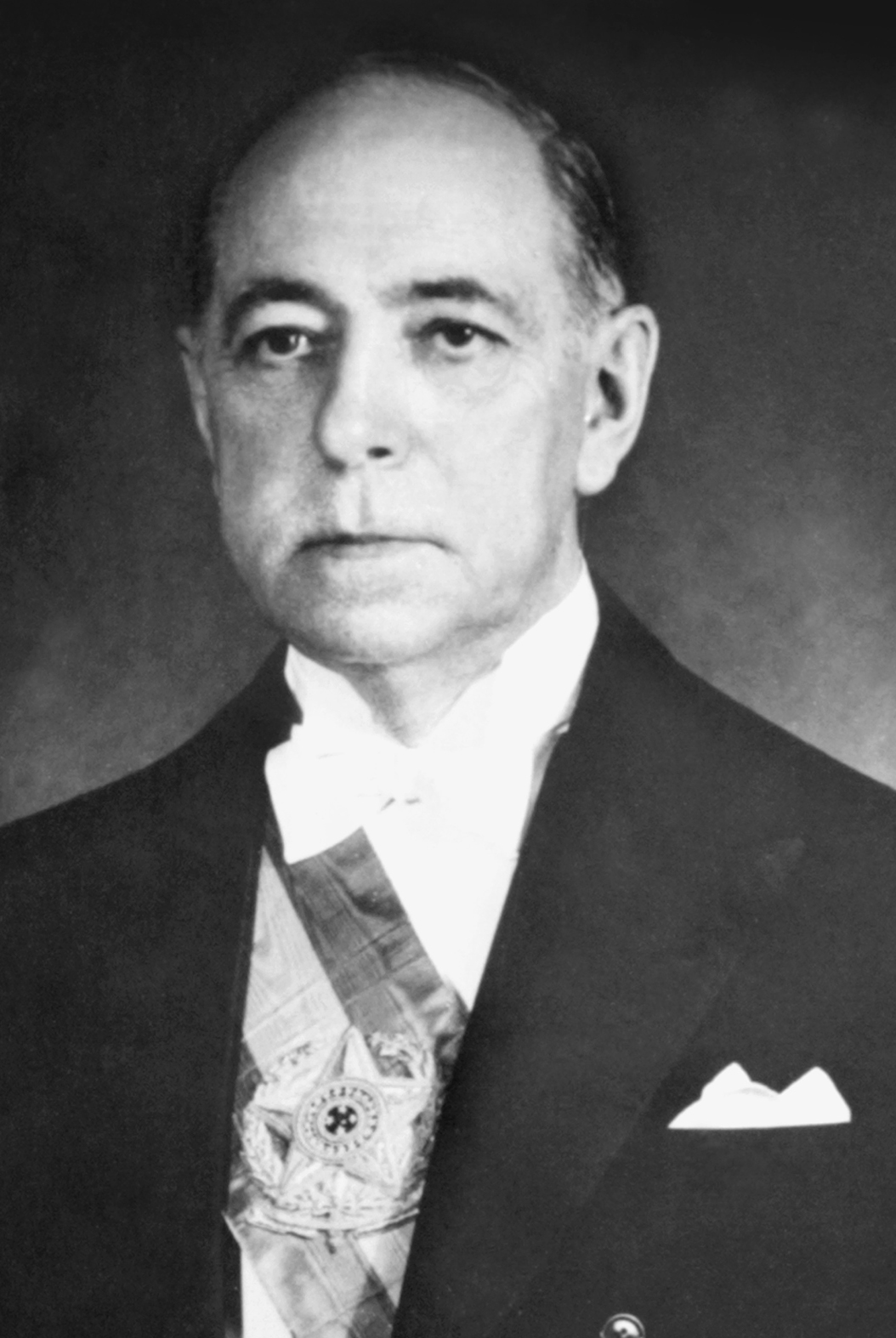

20th President of Brazil
- In office 11 November 1955 – 31 January 1956
- Vice President: Vacant
- Preceded by: Carlos Luz
- Succeeded by: Juscelino Kubitschek

12th Vice President of Brazil
- In office 19 September 1946 – 31 January 1951
- President: Eurico Dutra
- Preceded by: Melo Viana
- Succeeded by: Café Filho

Vice President of the Federal Senate
- In office 3 February 1955 – 17 November 1955
- Preceded by: Marcondes Filho
- Succeeded by: Apolônio Sales

President of the Chamber of Deputies
- In office 12 March 1951 – 3 February 1955
- Preceded by: Cirilo Júnior
- Succeeded by: Carlos Luz
Executive offices
1956–1956	Minister of Education (acting)
1956–1957	Minister of Justice and Internal Affairs
1937–1945	Federal Intervenor in Santa Catarina
1935–1937	Governor of Santa Catarina
1914–1914	Chief of Staff to the President of Santa Catarina
Legislative offices
1957–1958	Member, Federal Senate
1955–1955	Member, Federal Senate
1951–1955	Member, Chamber of Deputies
1946–1946	Member, Federal Senate
1919–1921	Member, Legislative Assembly
1911–1912	Member, Legislative Assembly
Party political offices
1947–1949	President of the Social Democratic Party
1927–1932	President of the Liberal Party of Santa Catarina

Personal details
- Born: Nereu de Oliveira Ramos; 3 September 1888 Lages, Santa Catarina, Brazil
- Died: 16 June 1958 (aged 69) São José dos Pinhais, Paraná, Brazil
- Party: PRC (1911–1931); PLC (1931–1937); PSD (1945–1958)
- Spouse: Beatriz Paranhos Pederneiras (m. 1916)
- Children: 4
- Parent: Vidal Ramos (father)
- Education: Faculty of Law of Largo de São Francisco
- Nereu Ramo's voice Speech by Nereu Ramos on the Ministry of Justice and Internal Affairs' achievements (recorded 1956)

Nereu de Oliveira Ramos (Brazilian Portuguese pronunciation: [neˈɾew dʒi oliˈvejɾɐ ˈʁɐmus]; 3 September 1888 – 16 June 1958) was a Brazilian lawyer and politician. He briefly served as interim president of Brazil in the aftermath of the political crisis which culminated in the suicide of President Getúlio Vargas and the impeachment of Deputy Carlos Luz and President Café Filho.

== Biography ==
=== Political career ===
Ramos was Vice President of the Republic between 1946 and 1951. The 1945 presidential elections were held for the office of president only, but the Constitution adopted on 18 September 1946 created the office of vice president, and established that the Constituent Assembly would choose the first vice president and swear him in, in the day following the promulgation of the Constitution. Nereu Ramos, until then a senator for Santa Catarina and a member of the Constituent Assembly, was elected vice president in that special election. In his capacity as Vice President of the Republic, Ramos served as President of the Senate. He served as the president of the Chamber of Deputies from 1951 to 1955.

Ramos was re–elected in 1954 to the Federal Senate as a representative from Santa Catarina. He became the Senate's President pro tempore in the following year. By this stage President Getúlio Vargas had taken his own life. There followed a series of brief presidential reigns: Vargas's vice president and successor, Café Filho, took a leave of absence, declaring himself unable to discharge the powers of the presidency due to poor health. By the time President Café Filho took his leave of absence, presidential elections for the next five–year term had been held, and Juscelino Kubitschek had been elected. Many people suspected that there would be a coup d'état to prevent the inauguration of the President–elect. Army Minister Henrique Teixeira Lott subscribed to that view, and he considered that President Café Filho had taken his leave of absence because he was in agreement with the supposed coup forces but unwilling to lead the coup himself. His leave of absence allowed the Speaker of the Chamber of Deputies, Carlos Luz, to assume the presidency as Acting President, and Luz was seen as hostile to the inauguration of the President–elect and likely to lead a coup to prevent it. Thus, only 48 hours after Café Filho's declaration of incapacity and the assumption of the powers of the presidency by Carlos Luz, Army Minister Lott led what he called a preventive counter-coup aimed at securing the inauguration of the President–elect chosen by the people, by avoiding the supposed coup that Luz would allegedly lead. In that preventive counter-coup, Luz was deposed, Café Filho was prohibited from resuming the powers and duties of the presidency (although he was not deposed, he was kept under house arrest for the remaining three months of his presidential term, and was barred from declaring his incapacity terminated), and the next man in the line of presidential succession, Senator Nereu Ramos, the Senate's President pro tempore assumed the powers of the presidency in the place of Carlos Luz.

Ramos assumed the presidency on 11 November 1955, to complete Vargas's term. He served until January 31, 1956, whereupon President–elect Kubitschek was inaugurated. Ramos was the last president to have been born in the Empire of Brazil.

== Death ==
Nereu Ramos died in a Cruzeiro airline crash on 16 June 1958, near Curitiba Afonso Pena International Airport.

== Gallery ==
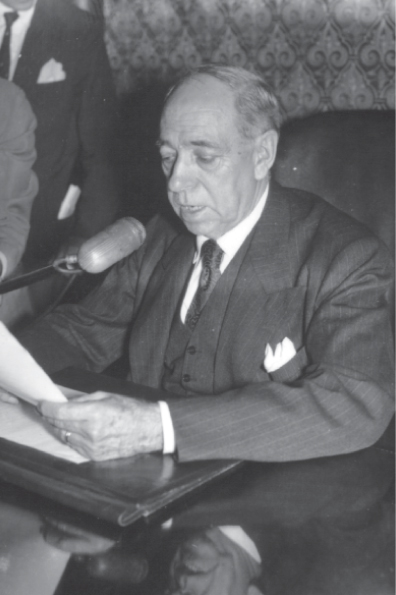
President Ramos in 1955

Outgoing president Nereu Ramos (center) at the inauguration of Juscelino Kubitschek on January 31, 1956

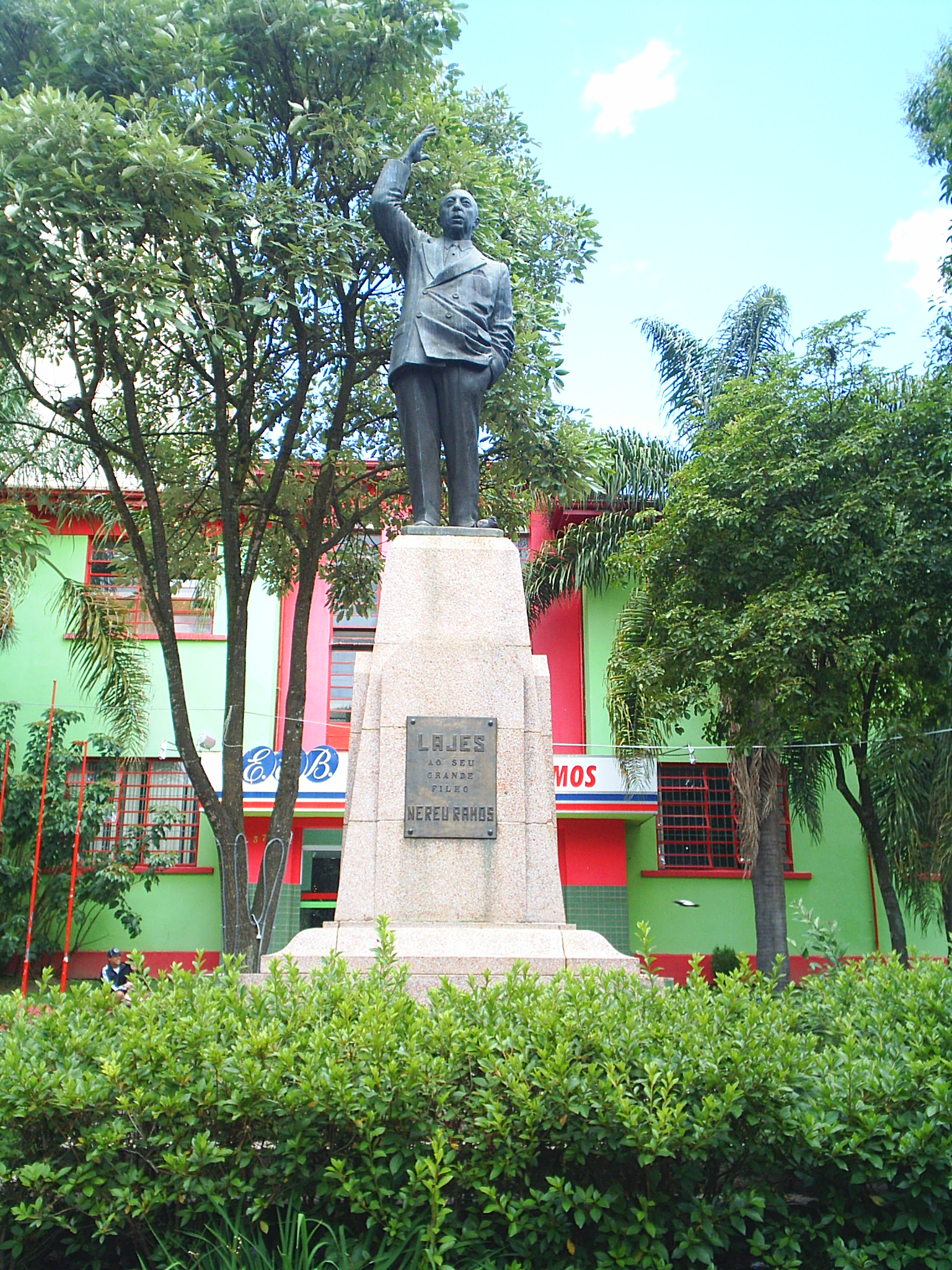
Statue in Lages, Santa Catarina

Political offices
Preceded by Fernando de Melo Viana	Vice President of Brazil; 1946–1951	Succeeded by Café Filho
Preceded by Carlos Luz	President of Brazil; 1955–1956	Succeeded by Juscelino Kubitschek
