= 2019 President of the Federal Senate of Brazil election =

- 2 February 2019

Needed to Win: Majority of the votes cast 77 votes cast, 39 needed for a majority
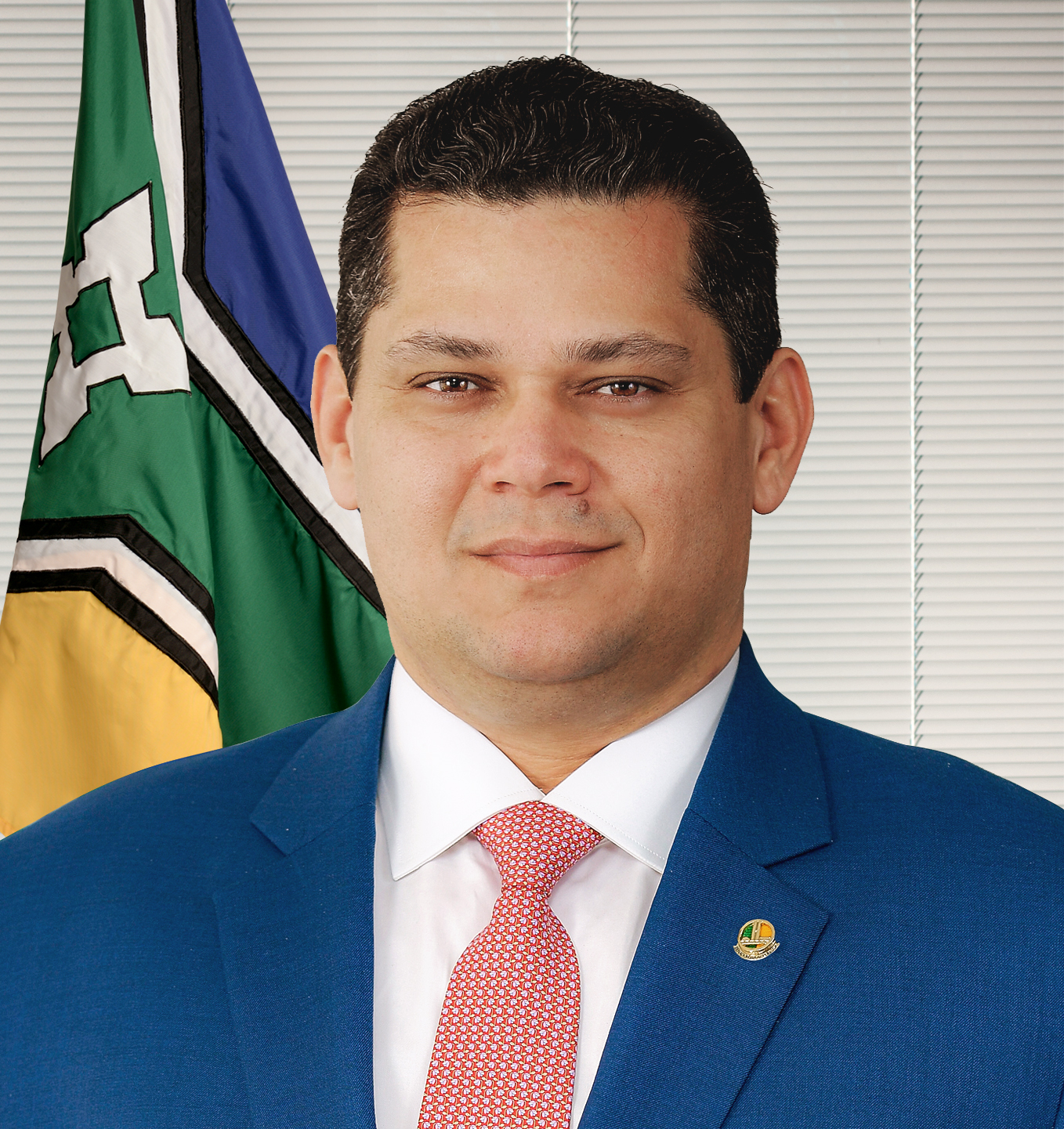

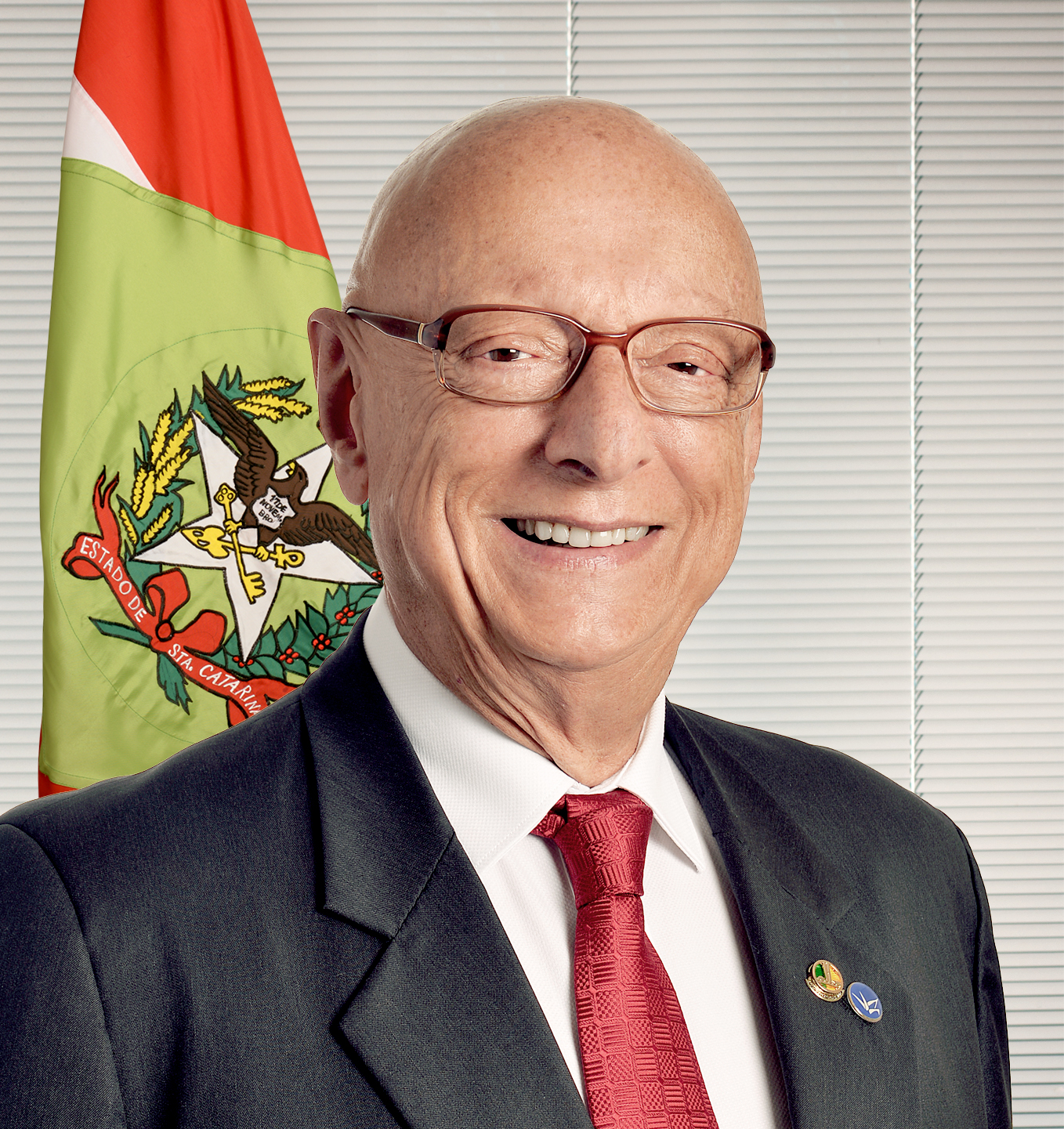

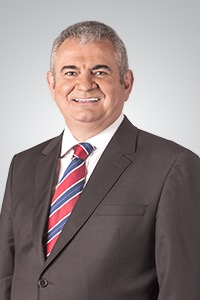

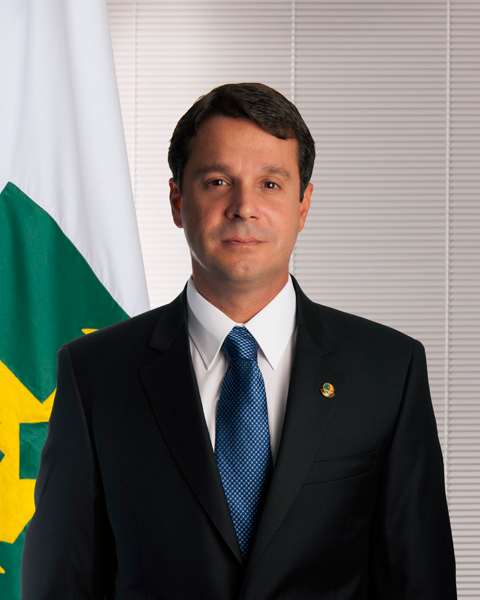

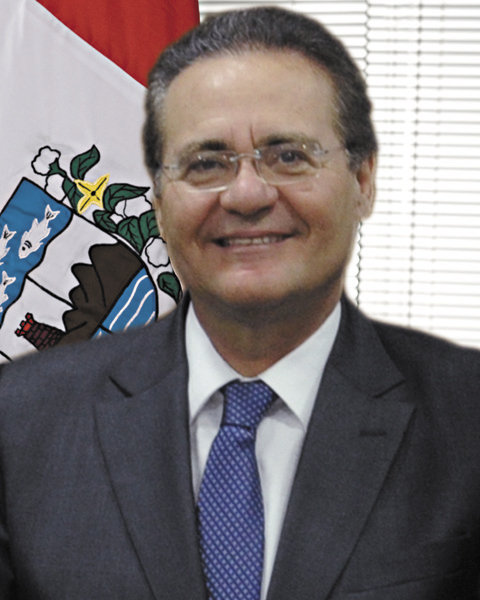

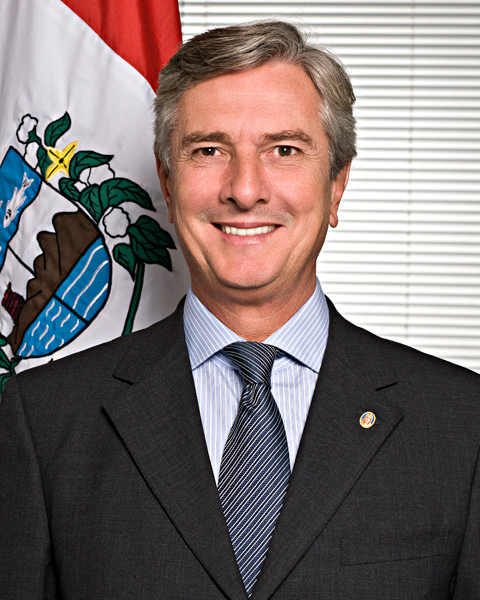
	Majority party	Minority party	Third party
Candidate	Davi Alcolumbre	Esperidião Amin	Angelo Coronel
Party	DEM	PP	PSD
Leader's seat	Amapá	Santa Catarina	Bahia
Members' vote	42	13	8
	Fourth party	Fifth party	Sixth party
Candidate	José Reguffe	Renan Calheiros	Fernando Collor
Party	Independent	MDB	PROS
Leader's seat	Federal District	Alagoas	Alagoas
Members' vote	6	5	3
President before election
Eunício Oliveira
MDB
Elected President
Davi Alcolumbre
DEM

The 2019 President of the Federal Senate of Brazil election took place on 2 February 2019, originally one day before, following the opening day of the 56th Legislature of the National Congress, almost four months after the 2018 elections.

The Acting President of the Federal Senate, Davi Alcolumbre (DEM–AP), administered the oath of office of the members of the Senate and the Dean of the Federal Senate, José Maranhão (MDB–PB), administered the session of election for President.

Former President Renan Calheiros ran for a fifth term as President, but withdrawn the election and was defeated by Alcolumbre.

== Candidates ==
=== Confirmed candidates ===
- Davi Alcolumbre (DEM) - Senator from Amapá since 2015; Federal Deputy from Amapá 2003–2015.
- Angelo Coronel (PSD) - Senator for Bahia taking office in 2019; President of the Legislative Assembly of Bahia 2017–2018; State Deputy of Bahia since 2003, 2001–2002, 1995–1999; Mayoir of Coração de Maria 1989–1993.
- Esperidião Amin (PP) - Senator for Santa Catarina taking office in 2019, 1991–1999; Federal Deputy from Santa Catarina since 2011; Governor of Santa Catarina 1999–2003, 1983–1987; Mayor of Florianópolis 1989–1990, 1975–1978.
- José Reguffe (I) - Senator for Federal District since 2015; Federal Deputy for Federal District 2011–2015; District Deputy of Federal District 2007–2011.
- Fernando Collor de Mello (PROS) - Senator for Alagoas since 2007; 32nd President of Brazil 1990–1992; 55th Governor of Alagoas 1987–1989; Federal Deputy from Alagoas 1983–1987; 57th Mayor of Maceió 1979–1983.

=== Lost in conventions ===
- Simone Tebet (MDB) - Senator for Mato Grosso do Sul since 2015; Vice Governor of Mato Grosso do Sul 2011–2015; Secretary of Government of Mato Grosso do Sul 2013–2014; Mayor of Três Lagoas 2005–2010; State Deputy of Mato Grosso do Sul 2003–2005.

MDB convention results
Party	Candidate	Votes	%
MDB	Renan Calheiros	7	58.33%
MDB	Simone Tebet	5	41.67%

=== Withdrawn candidates ===
- Tasso Jereissati (PSDB) - Senator for Ceará since 2015, 2003–2011; Governor of Ceará 1995–2002, 1987–1991.
- Renan Calheiros (MDB) - Senator for Alagoas since 1995; President of the Federal Senate 2013–2017, 2005–2007; Minister of Justice 1998–1999; Federal Deputy from Alagoas 1983–1991; State Deputy of Alagoas 1979–1983.
- Major Olímpio (PSL) - Senator for São Paulo taking office in 2019; Federal Deputy from São Paulo since 2015; State Deputy of São Paulo 2007–2015.
- Alvaro Dias (PODE) - Senator for Paraná since 1999, 1983–1987; Governor of Paraná 1987–1991; Federal Deputy from Paraná 1975–1983; State Deputy of Paraná 1971–1975; City Councillor of Londrina 1969–1971.

== Formal voting ==
Candidate	Party	Votes	%
Davi Alcolumbre (AP) ✓	DEM	42	54.55
Esperidião Amin (SC)	PP	13	16.88
Angelo Coronel (BA)	PSD	8	10.39
José Reguffe (DF)	Ind.	6	7.79
Renan Calheiros (AL)	MDB	5	6.49
Fernando Collor (AL)	PROS	3	3.90
Total		77	100.00
Valid votes		77	100.00
Invalid/blank votes		0	0.00
Total votes		77	100.00
Registered voters/turnout		81	95.06
