= Council of the Republic (Brazil) =

- Conselho da República
- Coat of arms of Brazil
- Predecessor: Council of State (1824-1889)
- Formation: 5 October 1988; 37 years ago
- Legal status: Consultative body to the President of the Republic
- Headquarters: Palácio do Planalto
- Location: Brasília, Federal District
- Members: 15
- Chairman: Luiz Inácio Lula da Silva, President of the Republic
- Executive Secretary: Guilherme Boulos, Minister of State of the General Secretariat of the Presidency of the Republic

The Council of the Republic (Portuguese: Conselho da República) is the superior consultative body to the President of Brazil, established for consultations regarding exceptional constitutional provisions and for matters relevant to the stability of democratic institutions. The Constitution establishes that the body must issue an opinion in cases of federal intervention, a state of defense, and a state of siege.

== Operation ==
The Council of the Republic was initially provided for in article 89 of the Constitution and organized by federal law in 1990.

According to the law, the President of the Republic is responsible for convening the Council in the case of federal intervention, state of defence, state of siege and also on relevant issues relevant to the stability of democratic institutions. As an consultative body, the President is not obligated to put in practice the measures from the council's advice.

== Membership ==
The Council of the Republic consists of the President, the Vice President, the Minister of Justice and members of the National Congress who serve ex officio. There are also six members selected two each by the President, the Federal Senate and the Chamber of Deputies among any brazilian citizens by birth who are over 35 years old.

The selected members are referred as Councilors of the Republic (Portuguese: Conselheiros da República), they and their substitutes serve a non-renewable three-year term. As of September 2026, the terms of office of all Councilors of the Republic had expired.

=== Current members ===
Order	Office	Portrait	Incumbent	Taking office
1	President of the Republic		Luiz Inácio Lula da Silva	1 January 2023
2	Vice President of the Republic		Geraldo Alckmin	1 January 2023
3	President of the Chamber of Deputies		Federal Deputy Hugo Motta	1 February 2025
4	President of the Federal Senate		Senator Davi Alcolumbre	1 February 2025
5	Minister of State of Justice and Public Security		Wellington César Lima e Silva	15 January 2026
6	Leader of the Majority in the Chamber of Deputies		Federal Deputy Silvio Costa Filho	25 June 2026
7	Leader of the Majority in the Federal Senate		Senator Veneziano Vital do Rêgo	19 February 2025
8	Leader of the Minority in the Chamber of Deputies		Federal Deputy Gustavo Gayer	19 December 2025
9	Leader of the Minority in the Federal Senate		Senator Ciro Nogueira	5 February 2025
10	Appointed by the President		Augusto Heleno	19 February 2021
11	Appointed by the President		Paulo Skaf	19 February 2021
12	Elected by the Chamber of Deputies		José Carlos Aleluia	14 March 2018
13	Elected by the Chamber of Deputies		Eugênio Aragão	14 March 2018
14	Elected by the Federal Senate		Davi Alcolumbre	30 August 2022
15	Elected by the Federal Senate		Gilberto Kassab	30 August 2022

== Council meetings ==
Since 1990, the Council of the Republic only met twice, both meetings occurred in 2018 as joint sessions with the National Defence Council, during the presidency of Michel Temer.

- In February, for the a posteriori advice on the Rio de Janeiro public security federal intervention.
- In December, this time a priori, to give advice on the Roraima public security federal intervention.

In two previous situations, however, the Council almost convened:

- The first was in 2005, when the Order of Attorneys of Brazil formally asked to the Presidency, then held by Luiz Inácio Lula da Silva (PT), to summon the Council to deal with the political crisis created by the Mensalão scandal. According to the entity, the crisis would threaten the country's democratic institutions, one of the situations foreseen for its summoning;
- The second was in 2010, when then Governor of the Federal District, José Roberto Arruda (PR), was arrested accused of obstructing the Federal Police investigations of the Mensalão scandal in the Federal District, which investigated corruption cases in the federal unit. Due to the political destabilization in the district, which had five different governors in the period of 12 months, the Prosecutor General of the Republic requested a federal intervention in the Federal District, other case foreseen in the Council's attributions.

=== 2021 meeting announcement ===
On 7 September 2021, during manifestations in his favor in Brasília, São Paulo and other capitals, president Jair Bolsonaro announced he would convene the Council on the following day, for the purpose of "show the people's picture in the acts".

Bolsonaro gave a speech in Brasília in the beginning of the afternoon and then headed to São Paulo, where he also gave a speech. The mention to the meeting of the Council of the Republic happened during the speech in the federal capital. Bolsonaro said he would invite the president of the Supreme Federal Court, Luiz Fux, besides the justice is not member of the Council.

Tomorrow, I will convene the Council of the Republic, along with ministers, along with the President of the Chamber, the Senate and the Supreme Court, with this picture of you, I'll show them where we should all go.

In response, the Presidents of the Senate, Rodrigo Pacheco, and the Chamber of Deputies, Arthur Lira, reported they hadn't receive any formal invitation by the Presidency of the Republic. The President of the Supreme Court, Luiz Fux, said he would not be present, once he's not a member of the Council.

On the other hand, Vice President Hamilton Mourão said Bolsonaro was wrong when mentioning the meeting.

=== 2023 Federal intervention in the Federal District ===
In 2023, President Lula decreed federal intervention in the Federal District to put an end to a serious disruption of public order amidst the 8 January Brasília attacks. However, the Council of the Republic was not convened at the time.
