= 2023 President of the Federal Senate of Brazil election =

- 1 February 2023

Needed to win: Majority of the votes cast 81 votes cast, 41 needed for a majority
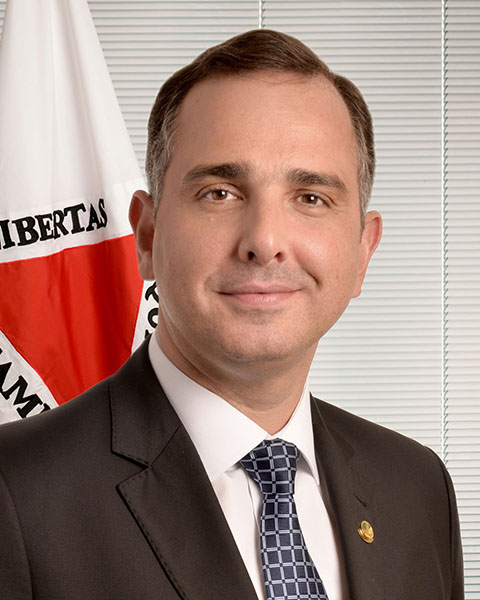

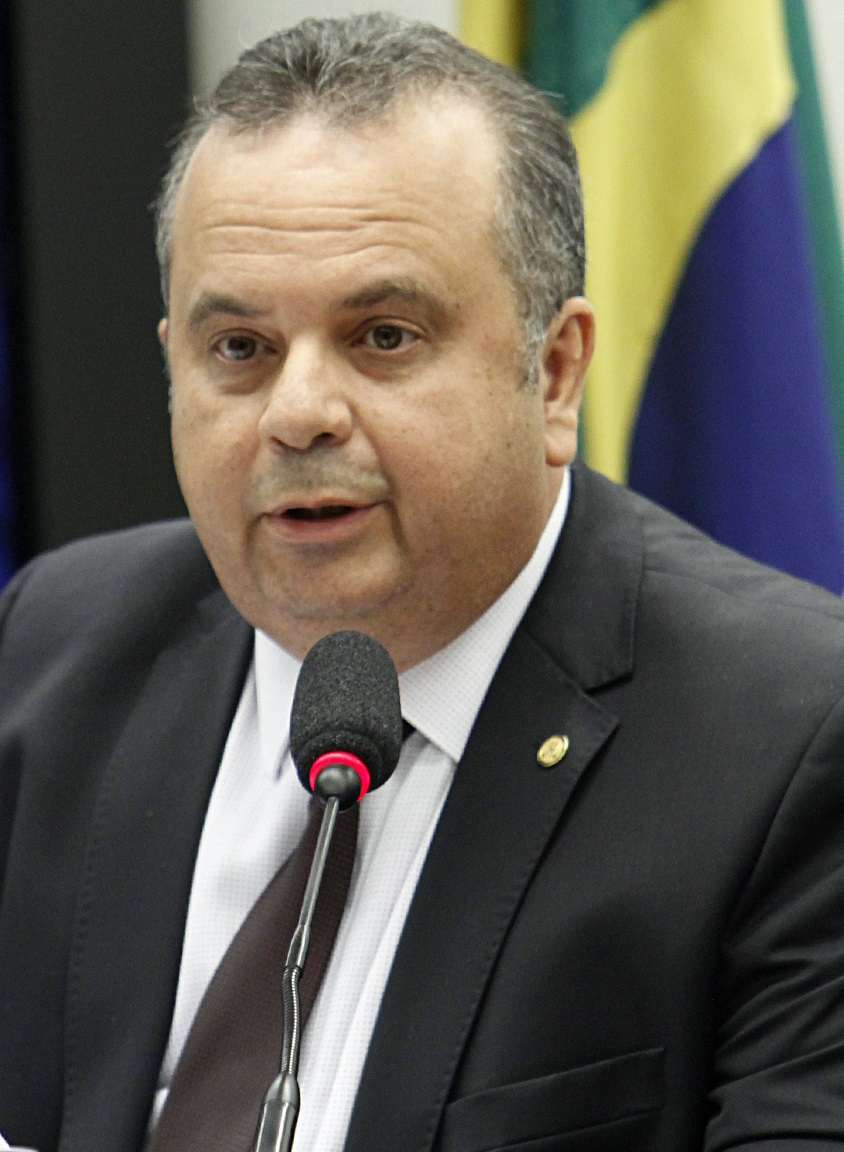
	Majority party	Minority party
Candidate	Rodrigo Pacheco	Rogério Marinho
Party	PSD	PL
Leader's seat	Minas Gerais	Rio Grande do Norte
Members' vote	49	32
President before election
Rodrigo Pacheco
PSD
Elected President
Rodrigo Pacheco
PSD

The 2023 President of the Federal Senate of Brazil election took place on 1 February 2023, during the opening day of the 57th Legislature of the National Congress, almost four months after the 2022 elections.

It will result in the election of the President of the Federal Senate, two vice presidents, the positions of 1st, 2nd, 3rd and 4th Secretaries and their respective replacements. They will hold a biennial term (2023-2025), making it impossible for them to be re-elected in the same Legislature - as established in Art. 59 of the Internal Regulations of the Federal Senate.

The election of the members of the Board of Directors of the Federal Senate will be carried out by a secret ballot, requiring a majority of votes, and also requiring the presence of a majority of the composition of the Senate and ensuring, as far as possible, the proportional participation of party representations or parliamentary blocs that act in the Federal Senate. (Art. 60 of the Internal Regulations of the Federal Senate).

The Dean of the Federal Senate, in this case, Oriovisto Guimarães (PODE–PR), will administer the oath of office en masse to the rest of the members of the Senate, and Rodrigo Pacheco (PSD–MG) will administer the oath of office to the new President.

Incumbent President Rodrigo Pacheco was able to run for a second consecutive term and was re-elected for his office.

== Candidates ==
=== Confirmed candidates ===
- Rodrigo Pacheco (PSD) – Senator for Minas Gerais since 2019; Member of the Chamber of Deputies 2015–2019.
- Rogério Marinho (PL) – Member of the Chamber of Deputies for Rio Grande do Norte since 2015, 2007–2012; Minister of Regional Development 2020–2022; Special Secretary of Social Security and Labour 2019–2020; State Secretary of Economic Development of Rio Grande do Norte 2012–2014.

=== Withdrawn candidates ===
- Eduardo Girão (PODE) – Senator for Ceará since 2019; Chairman of Fortaleza Esporte Clube 2017. Girão announced on the election day he was withdrawing his candidacy, to support Rogério Marinho.

== Formal voting ==
=== President ===
Candidate	Party	Votes	%
Rodrigo Pacheco (MG) ✓	PSD	49	60.49
Rogério Marinho (RN)	PL	32	39.51
Total		81	100.00
Valid votes		81	100.00
Invalid/blank votes		0	0.00
Total votes		81	100.00
Registered voters/turnout		81	100.00

=== Others ===
A single ticket composed by senators Veneziano Vital do Rêgo (MDB-PB), Rodrigo Cunha (PSDB-AL), Rogério Carvalho (PT-SE), Weverton Rocha (PDT-MA), Chico Rodrigues (PSB-RR) and Styvenson Valentim (PODE-RN) was presented for two Vice Presidents and four Secretaries, respectively.

Election of Senate Director's Board
Ballot →	2 February 2023	
Required majority →	Simple	
Yes	66 / 81	check
No	12 / 81	
Blank ballots	2 / 81	
Invalid ballots	0 / 81	
Absentees	1 / 81	
