= 2025 President of the Federal Senate of Brazil election =

- 1 February 2025

Needed to Win: Majority of the votes cast 81 votes cast, 41 needed for a majority
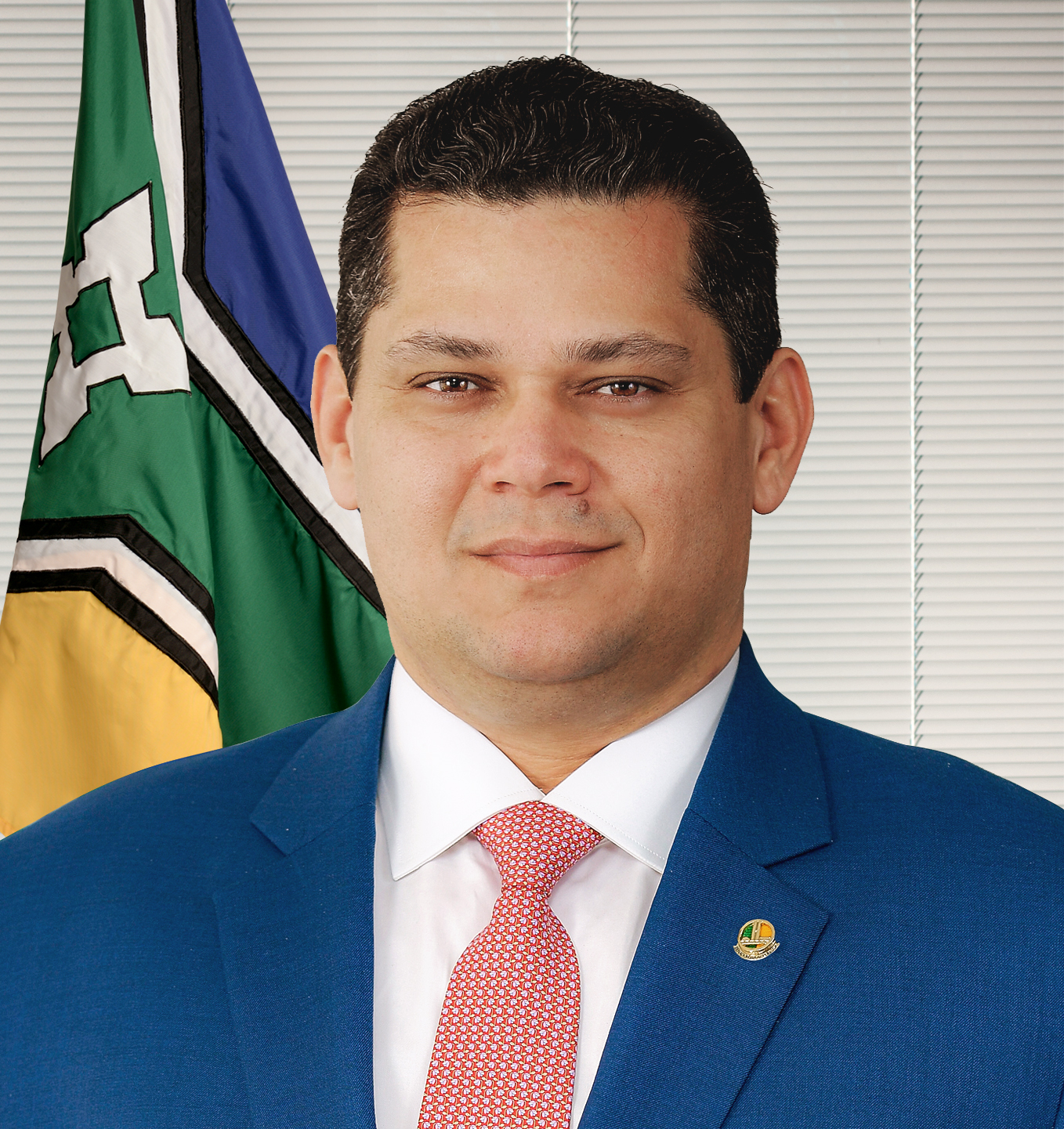

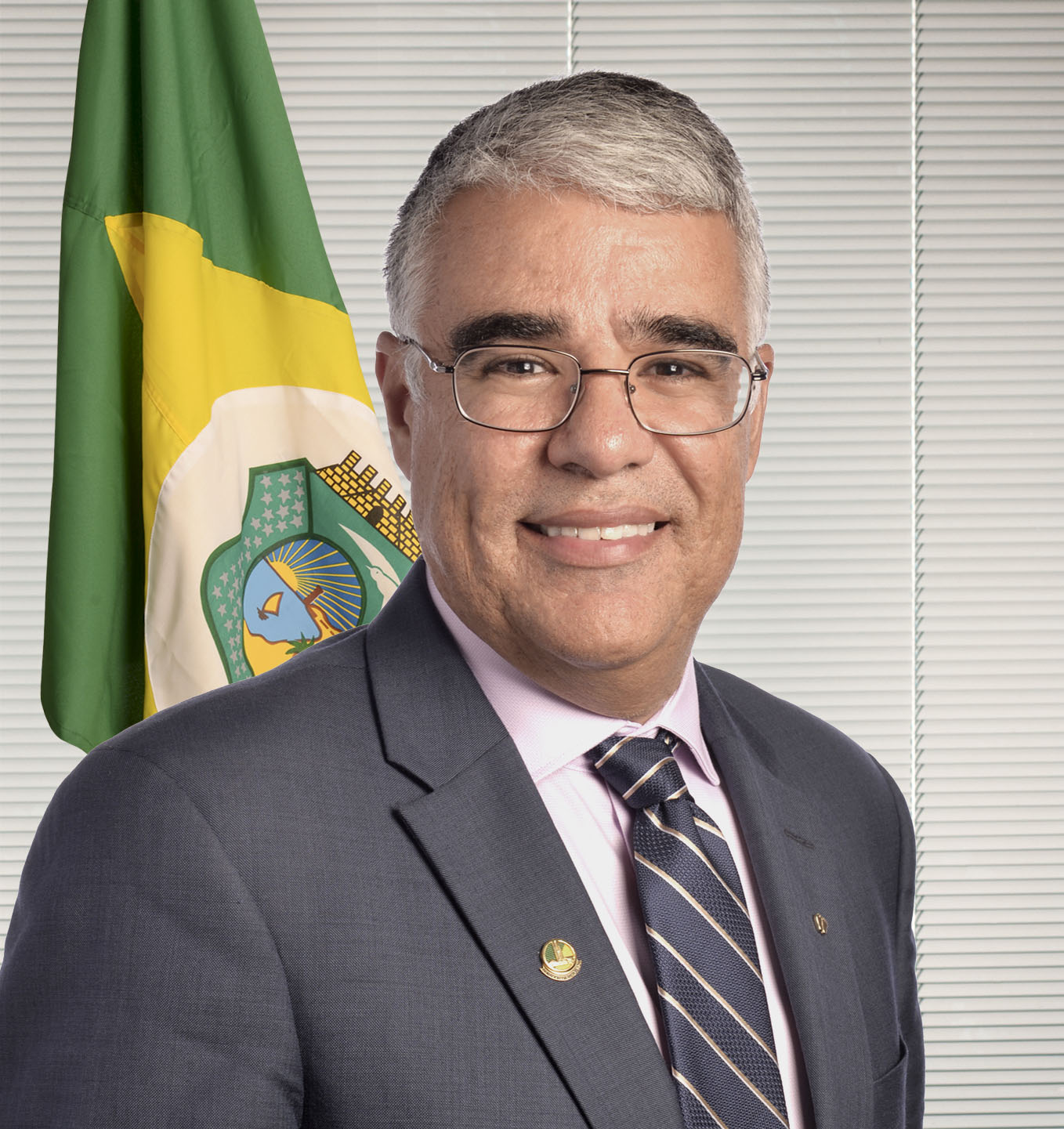

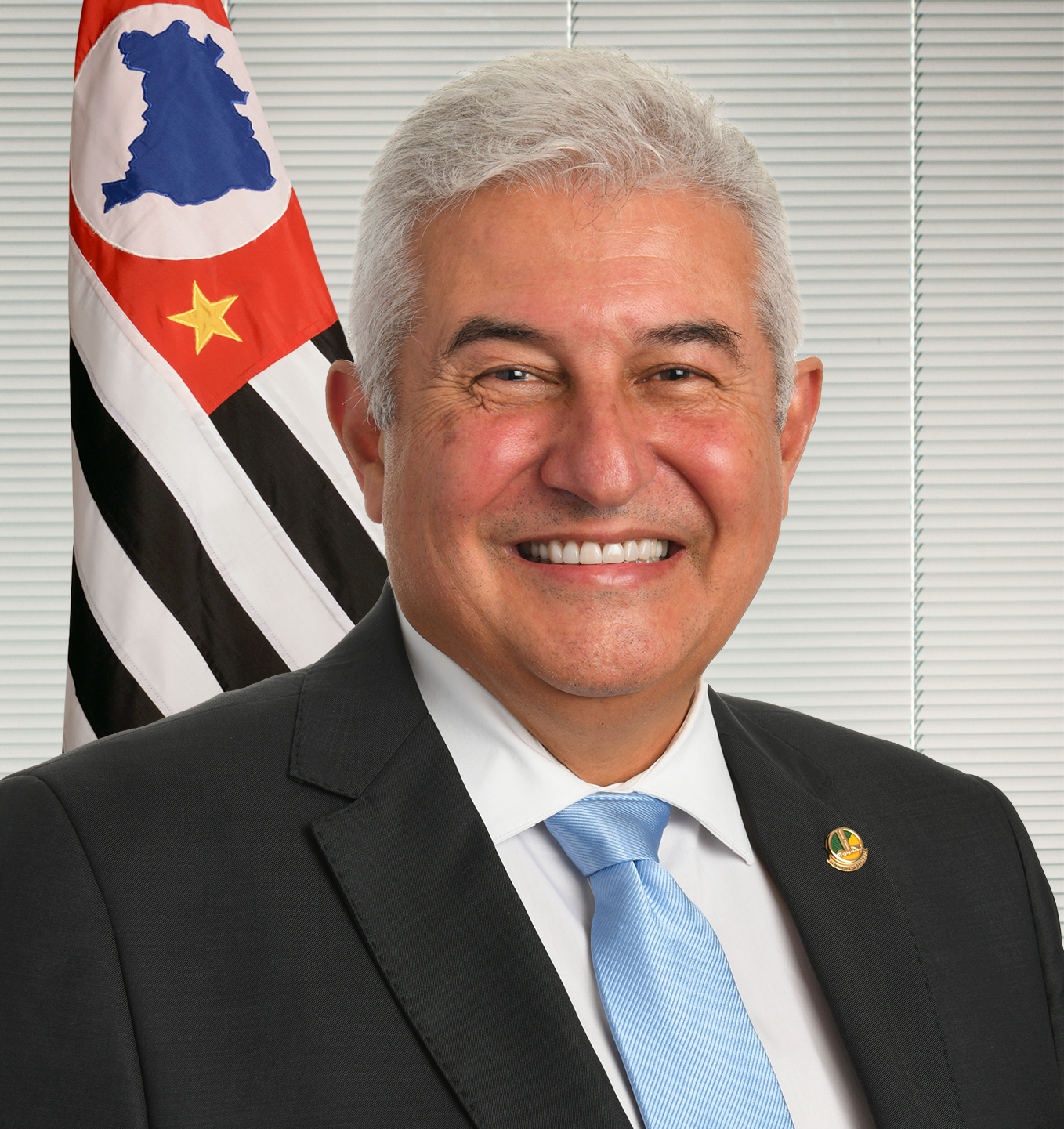
	Majority party	Minority party	Third party
Candidate	Davi Alcolumbre	Eduardo Girão	Marcos Pontes
Party	UNIÃO	NOVO	PL
Leader's seat	Amapá	Ceará	São Paulo
Members' vote	73	4	4
President before election
Rodrigo Pacheco
PSD
Elected President
Davi Alcolumbre
UNIÃO

The 2025 President of the Federal Senate of Brazil election took place in February 2025, the opening day of the 3rd Session of the 57th Legislature of the National Congress. It will result in the election of the President of the Federal Senate, two vice presidents, the positions of 1st, 2nd, 3rd and 4th secretaries and their respective replacements. They will hold a biennial term (2025–2027), making it possible to be re-elected in the next Legislature - as established in Article 59th of the Senate Statute.

The incumbent president, Rodrigo Pacheco, is not able to run for a third term. The election will be carried out by secret ballot and paper ballot, requiring a simple majority and presence of the majority of the seating senators - as established in the Article 60th of the Senate Statute. Former president Davi Alcolumbre was elected with 73 votes.

== Candidates ==
=== Confirmed candidates ===
- Davi Alcolumbre (UNIÃO-AP) - Member of the Senate for Amapá since 2015; President of the Senate 2019–2021; endorsed by PDT, PL, PP, PSB, PT, UNIÃO, MDB and PSD.
- Eduardo Girão (NOVO-CE) - Member of the Senate for Ceará since 2019.
- Marcos Pontes (PL-SP) - Member of the Senate for São Paulo since 2023.

=== Withdrawn candidates ===
- Marcos do Val (PODE-ES) - Member of the Senate for Espírito Santo since 2019.
- Soraya Thronicke (PODE-MS) - Member of the Senate for Mato Grosso do Sul since 2019.

== Formal voting ==
=== President ===
Candidate	Party	Votes	%
Davi Alcolumbre (AP) ✓	UNIÃO	73	90.12
Eduardo Girão (CE)	NOVO	4	4.94
Marcos Pontes (SP)	PL	4	4.94
Total		81	100.00
Valid votes		81	100.00
Invalid/blank votes		0	0.00
Total votes		81	100.00
Registered voters/turnout		81	100.00
