= Estácio Coimbra =

Vice President of Brazil from 1922 to 1926

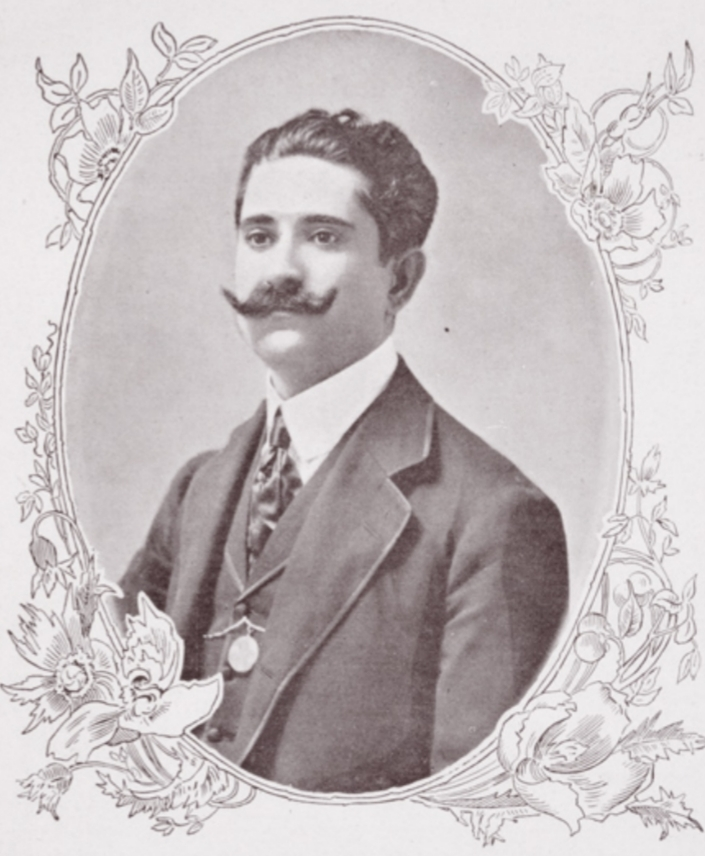

10th Vice President of Brazil
- In office 15 November 1922 – 15 November 1926
- President: Artur Bernardes
- Preceded by: Bueno de Paiva
- Succeeded by: Melo Viana
Executive offices
1926–1930	President of Pernambuco
1911–1911	President of Pernambuco
1895–1902	Mayor of Barreiros
Legislative offices
1915–1922	Federal Deputy for Pernambuco
1900–1911	Federal Deputy for Pernambuco

Personal details
- Born: 22 October 1872 Barreiros, Pernambuco, Empire of Brazil
- Died: 9 November 1937 (aged 65) Rio de Janeiro, Federal District, Brazil
- Spouse: Joana de Castelo Branco
- Education: Faculty of Law of Recife

Estácio de Albuquerque Coimbra (22 October 1872 – 9 November 1937) was a Brazilian lawyer and politician.

== Biography ==
Coimbra was born in an engenho in Barreiros, Pernambuco, to farming Portuguese João Coimbra and Francisca de Albuquerque Belo Coimbra. He obtained a law degree at the Recife Law School in 1892, and became mayor of his birthplace in 1894. On 10 January 1895, he was elected a state deputy to the Legislative Assembly of Pernambuco, and was the youngest person to be elected to the Chamber of Deputies until 1989, being a federal deputy between 1900 and 1912. As the president of the Legislative Assembly of Pernambuco, he was designated Governor of Pernambuco in 1911 after resignation of the governor and the vice governor refuses to succeed him.

He got away from politics in 1912, only to return as deputy federal from 1915 to 1922. He also occupied the position of the Ministry of Agriculture during the Epitácio Pessoa government (1919–1922) after becoming Vice President of Brazil in 1922. As Vice President, he also served as the President of the Senate. After leaving office in 1926, he took office of the state of Pernambuco, governing until the Revolution of 1930. Then, he exiled himself in Lisbon along with his secretary Gilberto Freyre. After being granted amnesty he returned to Brazil in 1934, and died in Rio de Janeiro on 9 November 1937. His corpse was taken to Pernambuco and buried at Palácio Joaquim Nabuco.

Political offices
Preceded by Francisco Álvaro Bueno de Paiva	Vice President of Brazil; 1922–1926	Succeeded by Fernando de Melo Viana
