= 2014 Ceará general election =

2014 Ceará gubernatorial election
- October 5, 2014
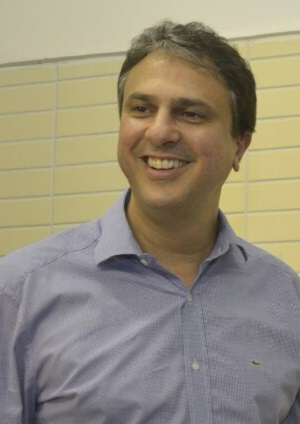

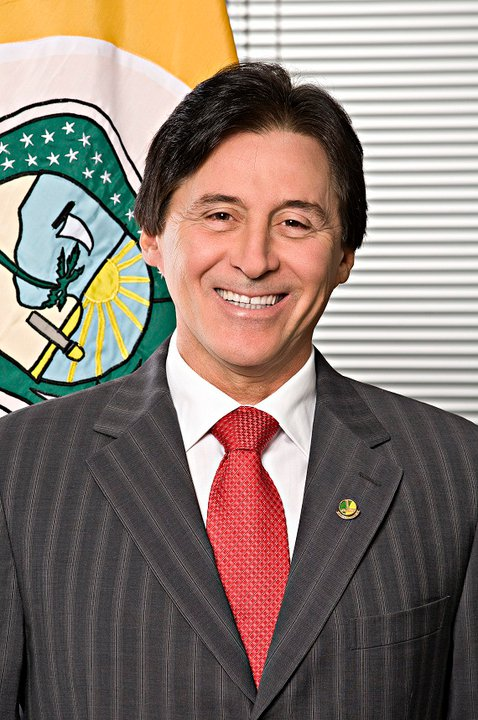
Nominee	Camilo Santana	Eunício Oliveira
Party	PT	MDB
Running mate	Izolda Cela	Roberto Pessoa
Popular vote	2,417,668	2,113,940
Percentage	53%	46%
Governor before election
Cid Gomes
PROS
Elected Governor
Camilo Santana
PT

The Ceará gubernatorial election was held on October 5, 2014 to elect the next governor of the state of Ceará. If a candidate receives more than 50% of the vote, there will be no round off elections. Governor Cid Gomes is ineligible to run due to term limits.

== Candidates ==
Candidate	Running mate	Coalition
Camilo Santana; PT	Izolda Cela; PROS	"To Ceará Keep Changing" (PT, PROS, PRB, PP, PDT, PTB, PSL, PRTB, PHS, PMN, PTC, PV, PEN, PPL, PSD, PCdoB, PTdoB, SD)
Eunício Oliveira; PMDB	Roberto Pessoa; PR	"Ceará of All" (PMDB, PR, PSDB, DEM, PPS, PRP, PSC, PSDC, PTN)
Eliane Novais; PSB	Leonardo Bayma; PSB	-
Aílton Lopes; PSOL	Benedito Oliveira Viana; PCB	"Socialist Left Front" (PSOL, PCB, PSTU)

== Opinion Polling ==
Date	Institute	Candidate				Blank/Null/Undecided
Date	Institute	Eunício Oliveira (PMDB)	Camilo Santana (PT)	Eliane Novais (PSB)	Aílton Lopes (PSOL)	Blank/Null/Undecided
September 29–30, 2014	Datafolha	50%	47%	2%	2%	-
September 29–30, 2014	Datafolha	39%	37%	1%	1%	22%
September 21–23, 2014	Ibope	43%	38%	3%	1%	15%
September 18–19, 2014	Datafolha	41%	34%	3%	1%	21%
September 1–2, 2014	Datafolha	41%	31%	4%	2%	23%
August 31–September 2, 2014	Ibope	42%	34%	4%	2%	18%
August 11–13, 2014	Datafolha	47%	19%	7%	4%	23%
July 18–20, 2014	Ibope	44%	14%	6%	3%	33%
