= Renzo Braz =

Brazilian politician (born 1980)

- Braz in 2026

Senator for Minas Gerais
- Incumbent
- Assumed office 30 September 2026
- Preceded by: Rodrigo Pacheco

Personal details
- Born: 11 April 1980 (age 46)
- Party: Progressistas (since 1999)

Renzo do Amaral Braz (born 11 April 1980) is a Brazilian politician serving as a member of the Senate since 2026. From 2011 to 2019, he was a member of the Chamber of Deputies.
