= Bueno de Paiva =

Vice President of Brazil from 1920 to 1922

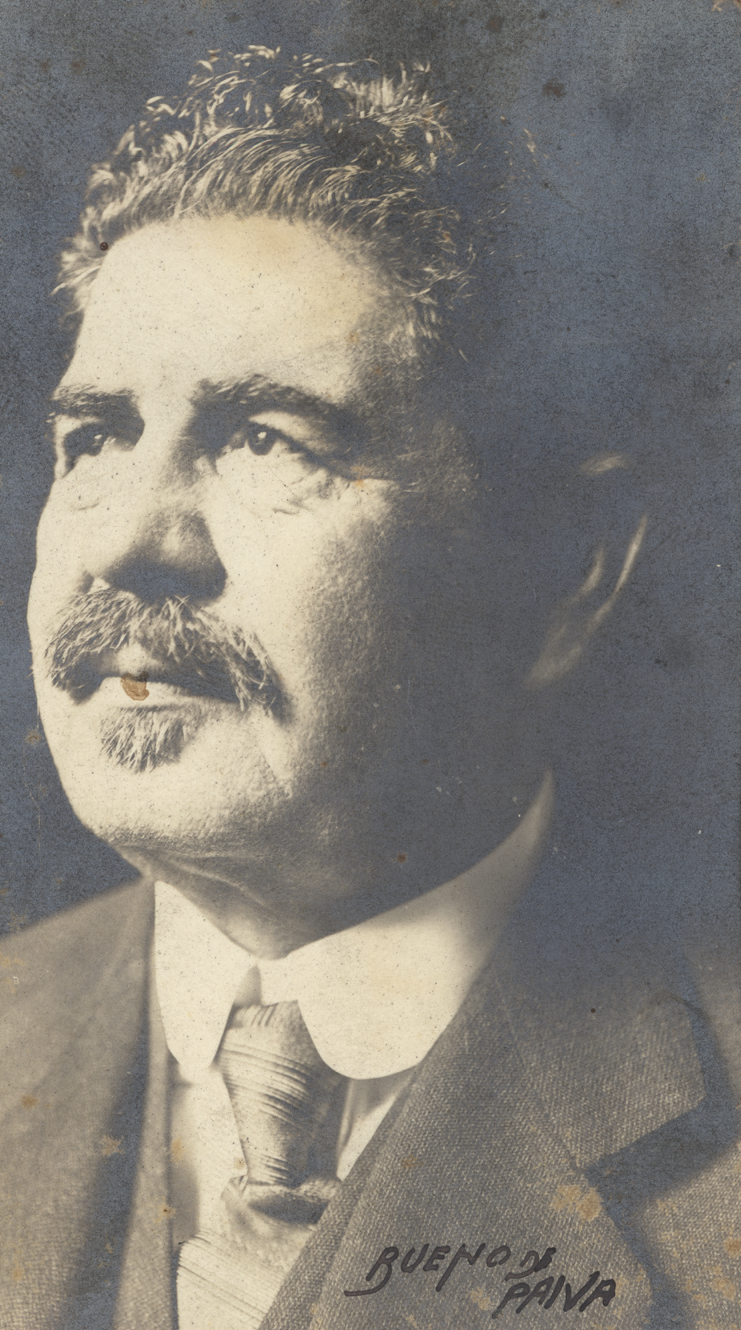

9th Vice President of Brazil
- In office 11 November 1920 – 15 November 1922
- President: Epitácio Pessoa
- Preceded by: Delfim Moreira
- Succeeded by: Estácio Coimbra
Legislative offices
1923–1928	Senator for Minas Gerais
1911–1920	Senator for Minas Gerais
1900–1911	Federal Deputy for Minas Gerais
1899–1900	State Senator of Minas Gerais
1898–1900	President of the Municipal Chamber of São José do Paraíso
1898–1900	Councillor of São José do Paraíso
1890–1892	Federal Deputy for Minas Gerais

Personal details
- Born: 17 September 1861 Vila do Caracol, Minas Gerais, Empire of Brazil
- Died: 4 August 1928 (aged 66) Rio de Janeiro, Federal District, Brazil
- Spouse: Maria Antonieta Carneiro de Castro
- Parent: Antônio de Paiva Bueno (father)
- Education: Faculty of Law of Largo de São Francisco
- Occupation: civil servant; lawyer; magistrate; politician

Francisco Álvaro Bueno de Paiva (17 September 1861 – 4 August 1928) was a Brazilian politician who was Vice President of Brazil from 11 November 1920 to 15 November 1922 under Epitácio Pessoa. As the vice president of Brazil, he also served as the president of the Senate.

Political offices
Preceded by Delfim Moreira	Vice President of Brazil; 1920–1922	Succeeded by Estácio Coimbra
