= Miro Teixeira =

Brazilian lawyer, politician and journalist (born 1945)

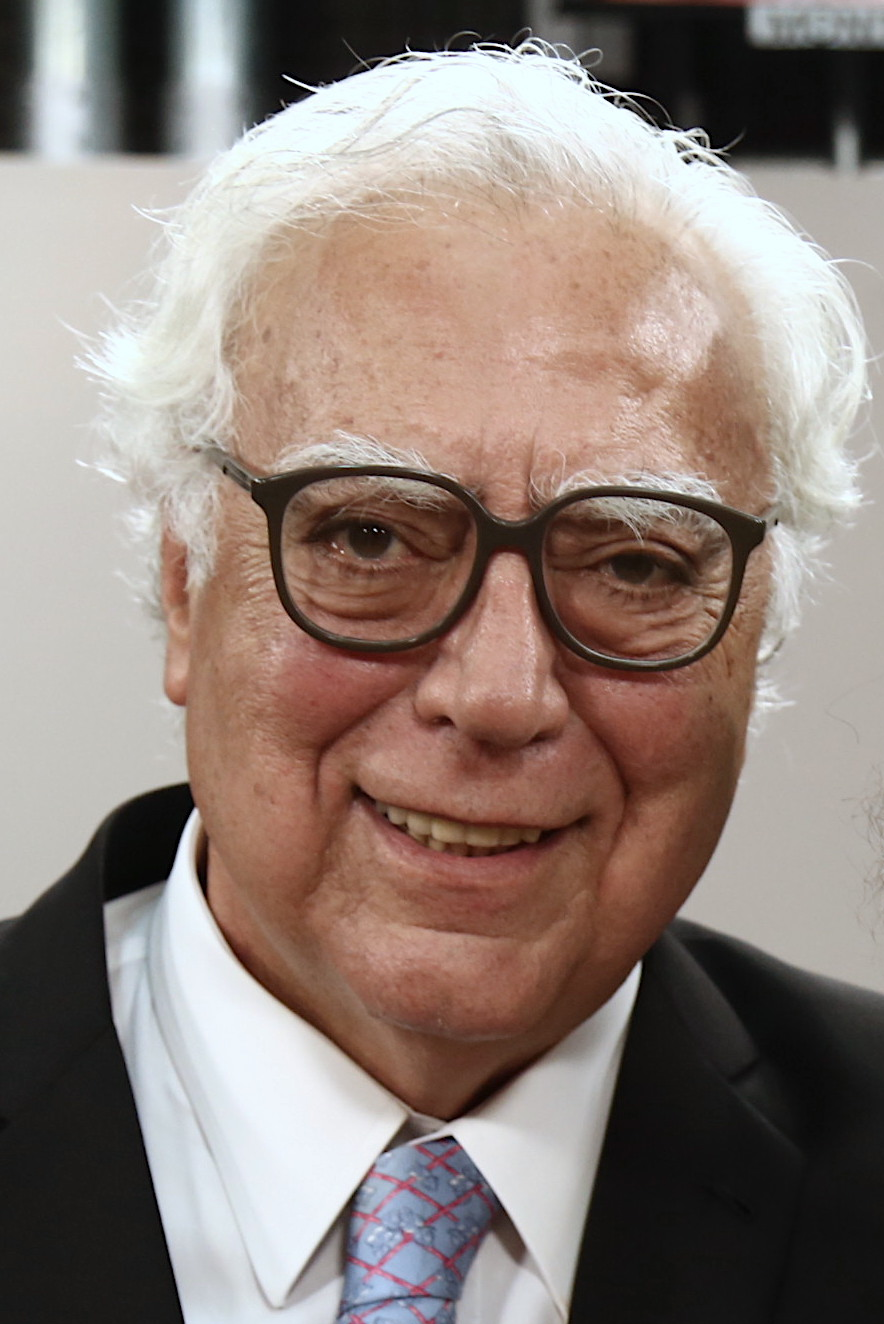

Member of the Chamber of Deputies
- In office 1 February 1975 – 1 February 2019
- Constituency: Rio de Janeiro
- In office 1 February 1971 – 1 February 1975
- Constituency: Guanabara

Minister of Communications
- In office 1 January 2003 – 1 January 2004
- President: Luiz Inácio Lula da Silva
- Preceded by: Juarez Quadros
- Succeeded by: Eunício Oliveira

Personal details
- Born: 27 May 1945 (age 81) Rio de Janeiro, Brazil
- Party: PDT (since 2021)
- Other political affiliations: See list: MDB (1971–1979); PP (1980–1981); PMDB (1981–1991); PDT (1991–2003); PPS (2004); PT (2004); PDT (2005–2013); PROS (2013–2015); REDE (2015–2021)
- Education: Candido Mendes University; National Autonomous University of Mexico
- Occupation: Lawyer, journalist

Miro Teixeira (born May 27, 1945) is a Brazilian lawyer, politician and journalist.

== Background ==
Teixeira graduated in Law at the Candido Mendes University. He operates from a political base in Rio de Janeiro.

== Political career ==
He began his career with the Brazilian Democratic Movement (Movimento Democrático Brasileiro), an opposition party to the military regime. At the start of the 1980s, together with Tancredo Neves he helped in the founding of the Partido Popular in a centrist initiative to balance the Brazil political landscape. Afterwards, he allied himself with Leonel Brizola and entered the Democratic Labour Party (PDT) where he remained for two decades. In 1996 he was a candidate for the local district of Rio and achieved fourth place.

In 2002, he supported Luiz Inácio Lula da Silva in the Brazilian Presidential election and was nominated to be Minister of Communications. During his term as minister, he broke with PDT and entered the Workers' Party. In 2004 he was relieved of his position by Lula and assumed the mandate of a federal deputy in the Brazilian House. In 2013 he was listed as a member in the party of former senator and 2010 and 2014 presidential candidate Marina Silva, Sustainability Network (REDE).

Political offices
Preceded by Juarez Martinho Quadros do Nascimento	Minister of Communications; 2003–2004	Succeeded by Eunício Oliveira
