= São José da Coroa Grande =

Municipality of Pernambuco, Brazil

- Municipality of Pernambuco, Brazil
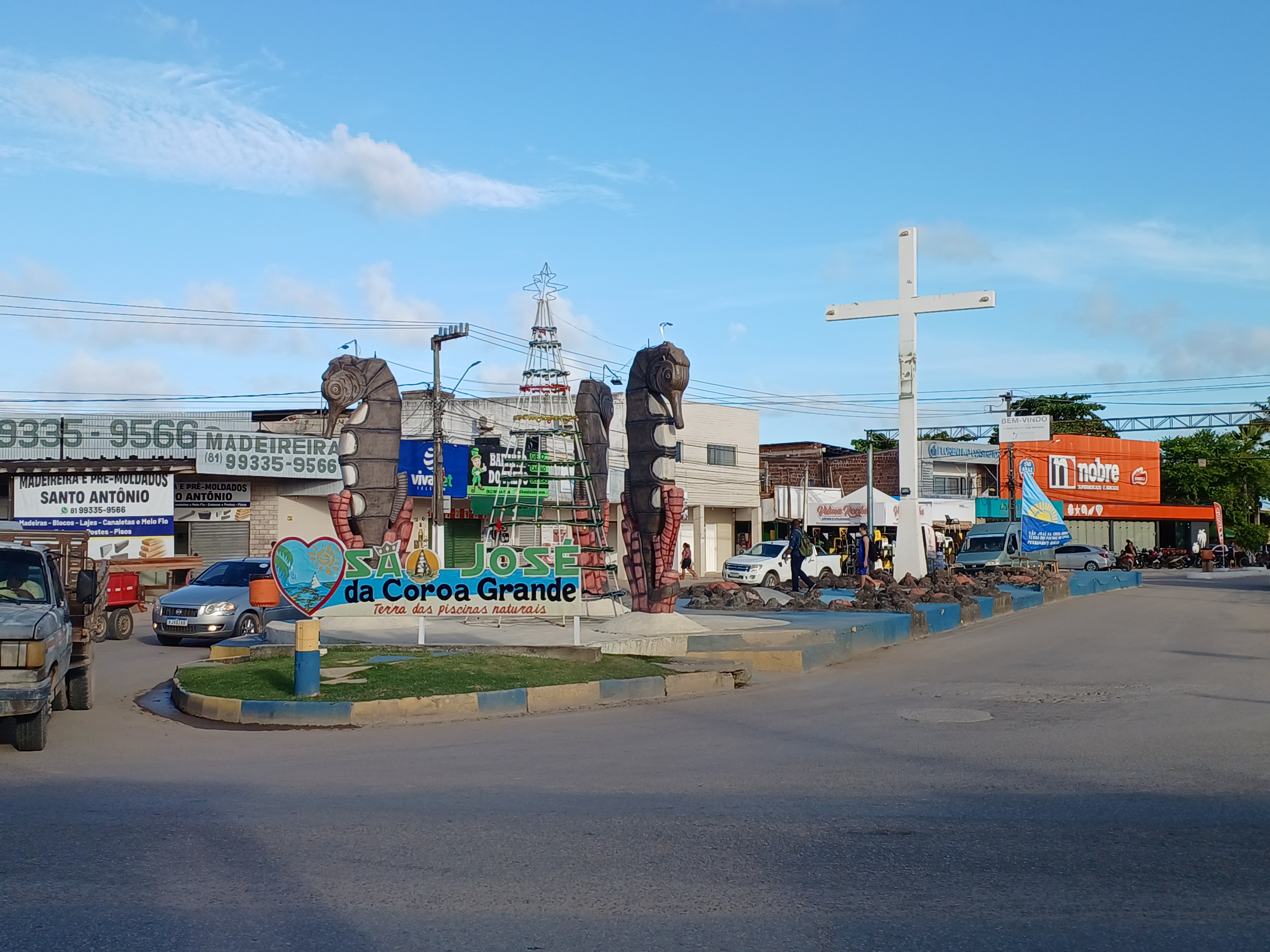
- City entrance of São José da Coroa Grande

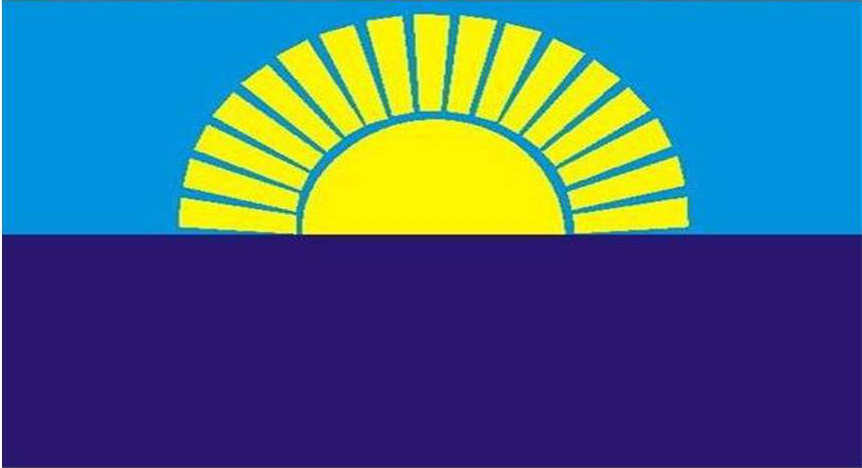
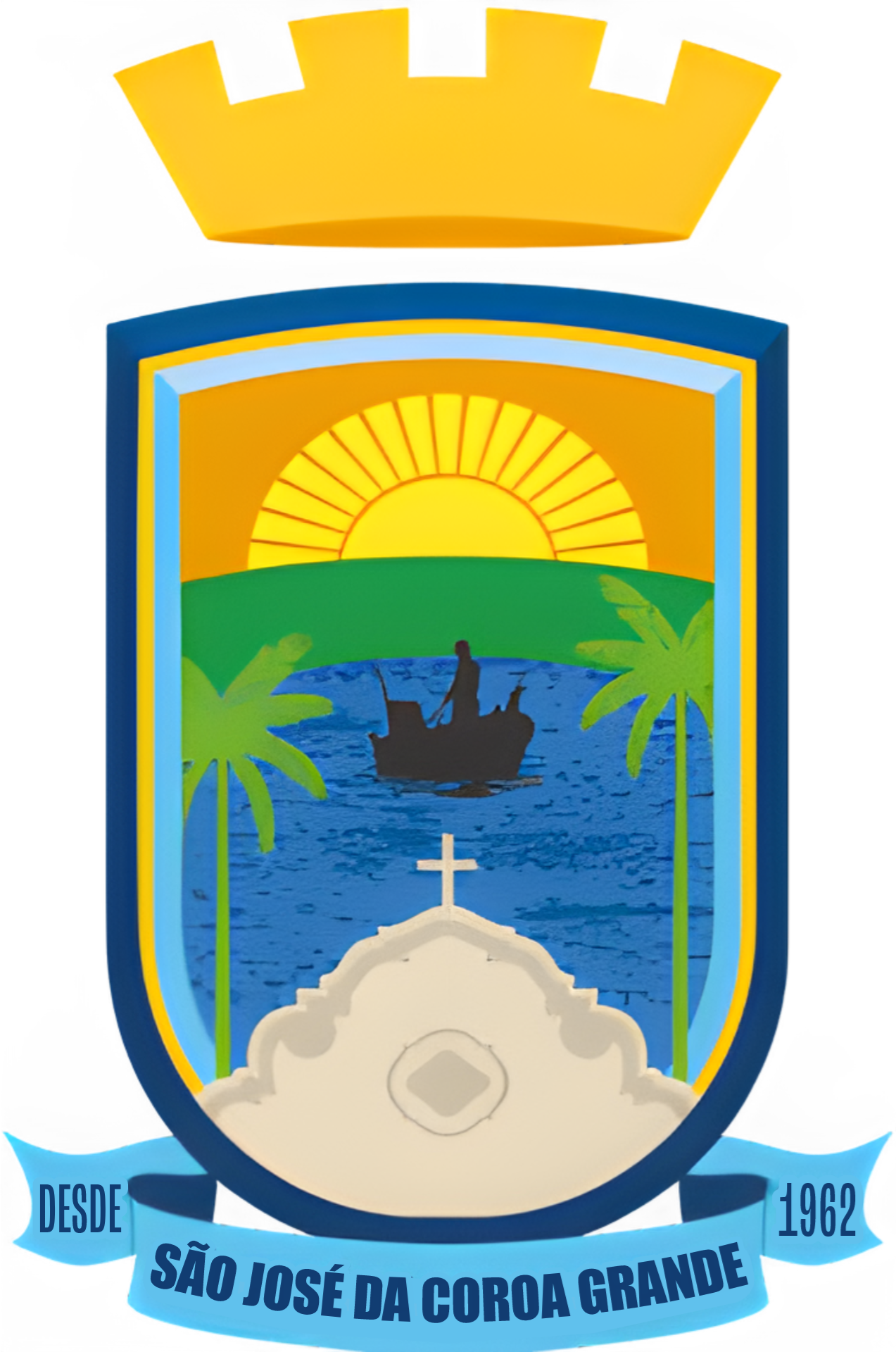
- Flag Coat of arms
- Etymology: In English "Saint Joseph of the Big Crown", named after Saint Joseph and "Big Crown" referring to the appearance of large crowns of land that form during low tide
- Motto: Brazilian Portuguese: A preservação da paz English: The preservation of peace
- Location of São José da Coroa Grande in Pernambuco

- Location within Brazil Location within South America
- Coordinates: 8°53′32″S 35°8′52″W
- Country: Brazil
- Region: Northeast
- State: Pernambuco
- Founded: 11 April 1962

Government
  - Mayor: José Barbosa de Andrade (PSD) (2025-2028)
  - Vice Mayor: Bruna Suelem Sales Alves (PSDB) (2025-2028)

Area
  - Total: 69.184 km^{2} (26.712 sq mi)
- Elevation: 2 m (6.6 ft)

Population (2022 Census)
  - Total: 18,825
  - Estimate (2025): 19,511
  - Density: 272.1/km^{2} (705/sq mi)
- Demonym: São-josé-coroa-grandense (Brazilian Portuguese)
- Time zone: UTC-03:00 (Brasília Time)
- Postal code: 55565-000
- HDI (2010): 0.608 – medium
- Website: saojosedacoroagrande.pe.gov.br

São José da Coroa Grande (Central northeastern portuguese pronunciation: [ˈsɐ̃w ʒuˈzɛ dɐ koˈɾoɐ ˈɡɾɐ̃di]) English: Saint Joseph of Crown Big) is a city in the state of Pernambuco with 19,511 inhabitants (2025). It is southernmost city of the state on the coast section.

== Geography ==
- State - Pernambuco
- Region - Zona da mata Pernambucana
- Boundaries - Barreiros (N and W); Alagoas state (S); Atlantic Ocean (E)
- Area - 69.2 km^{2}
- Elevation - 2 m
- Vegetation - Forest Subperenifólia and Coconut trees
- Clima - Hot tropical and humid
- Annual average temperature - 25.3 c
- Distance to Recife - 121 km

== Beaches ==
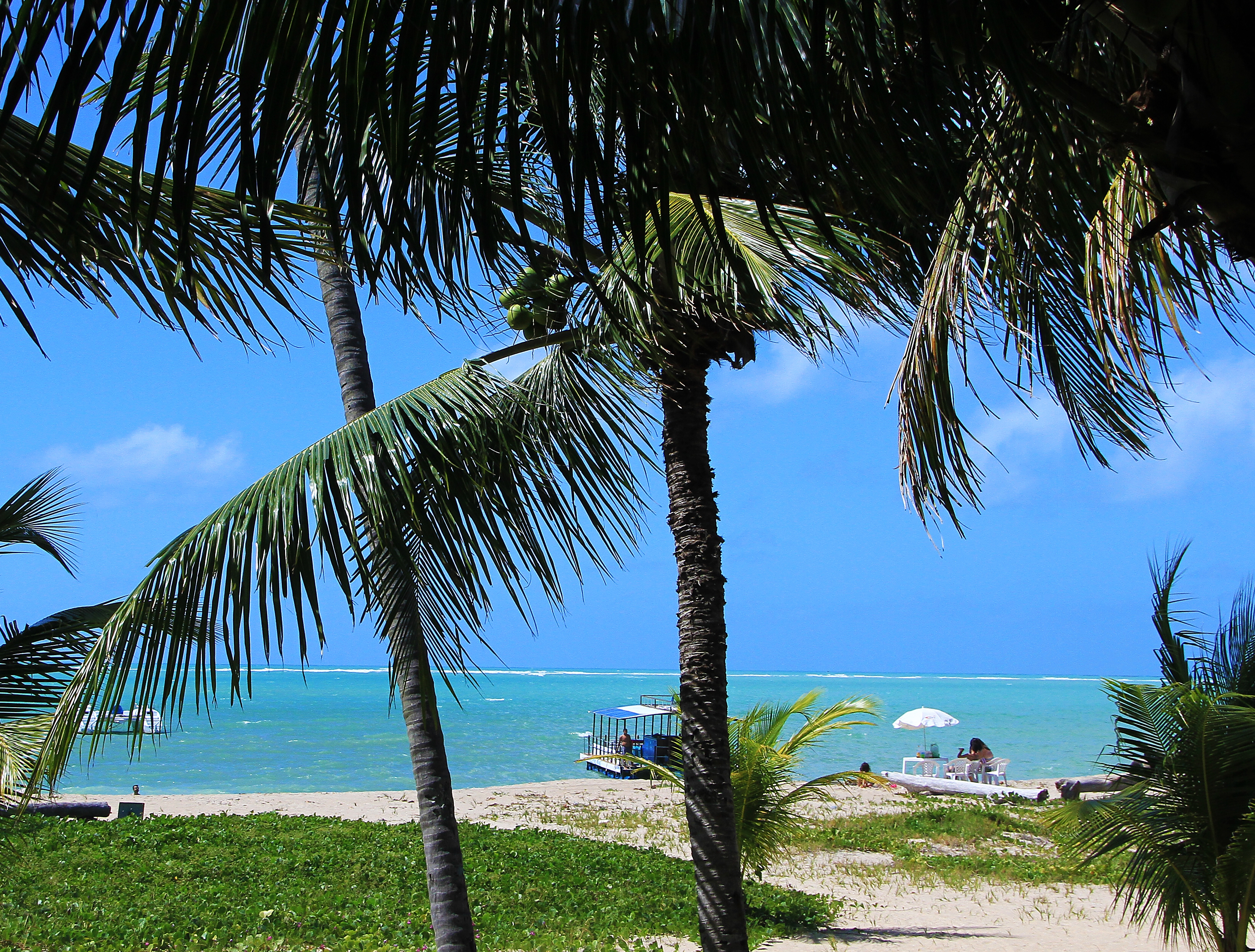
São José da Coroa Grande Beach, Pernambuco, Brasil

- Gravatá beach

Used for underwater fishing. Although still primitive, has vast area of coconut trees, mangrove vegetation and weak waves.

- Barra da Cruz beach

As Gravatá beach and Várzea do Una, is suitable for hunting underwater.

- Várzea do Una beach

Bay with strong waves, large strip of sand. Also is suitable for fishing underwater and is located in the estuary of Una River.

- Coroa Grande beach

Which means great crown, is located in the urban coast of the city. Has weak waves and sand banks up to the natural reefs, about 600 yards from the beach.

== Economy ==
The main economic activities in São José da Coroa Grande are based in tourism, artisanal fishing and agriculture, especially sugarcane and coconuts.

=== Economic Indicators ===
Population	GDP x(1000 R$).	GDP pc (R$)	PE
18.555	54.380	3.182	0.09%

Economy by Sector 2006

Primary sector	Secondary sector	Service sector
10.65%	10.69%	78.66%

=== Health Indicators ===
HDI (2000)	Hospitals (2007)	Hospitals beds (2007)	Children's Mortality every 1000 (2005)
0.628	1	22	12.6

== See also ==
- List of municipalities in Pernambuco
