= Melo Viana =

Vice President of Brazil from 1926 to 1930

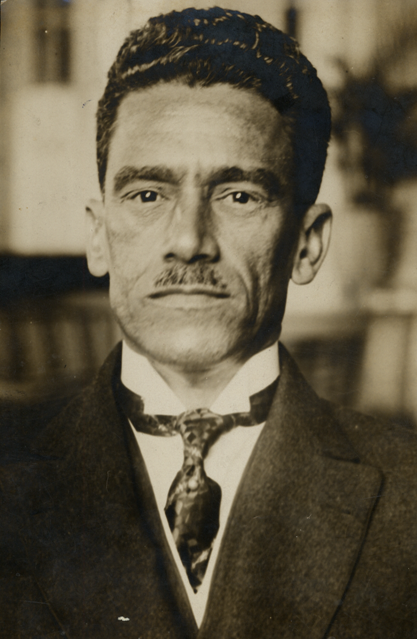

11th Vice President of Brazil
- In office 15 November 1926 – 24 October 1930
- President: Washington Luís
- Preceded by: Estácio Coimbra
- Succeeded by: Nereu Ramos

Legislative offices
- 1946–1951: Vice President of the Federal Senate
- 1946–1946: President of the Constituent Assembly
- 1946–1954: Senator for Minas Gerais
- 1903–1906: State Deputy of Minas Gerais

Civic offices
- 1938–1944: President of the Order of Attorneys of Brazil

Executive offices
- 1924–1926: President of Minas Gerais
- 1922–1924: Secretary of the Interior of Minas Gerais

Judicial offices
- 1918–1922: Attorney General of Minas Gerais

Personal details
- Born: Fernando de Melo Viana; 15 March 1878 Sabará, Minas Gerais, Empire of Brazil
- Died: 10 February 1954 (aged 75) Rio de Janeiro, Federal District, Brazil
- Spouse(s): Alfida Leite de Magalhães (m. 1906; died 1928) Clotilde Elejalde (m. 1928)
- Children: 4
- Education: Free Faculty of Law

Fernando de Melo Viana (15 March 1878 – 10 February 1954) was a Brazilian politician who was the vice president of Brazil from 15 November 1926 to 24 October 1930 serving under President Washington Luís. As vice president, he also served as the President of the Senate. Later, he served as President of the 1946 Constituent Assembly.

== Biography ==
He studied legal science at the Faculty of Law of Ouro Preto (Now the Faculty of Law at the Federal University of Minas Gerais). He later practiced law at Uberaba. He vice president under Washington Luis' administration and the 2nd mulatto to hold the position.

Political offices
Preceded by Estácio Coimbra	Vice President of Brazil; 1926–1930	Succeeded by Vital Soares
