= Barreiros, Pernambuco =

Municipality of Pernambuco, Brazil

Barreiros
- Municipality
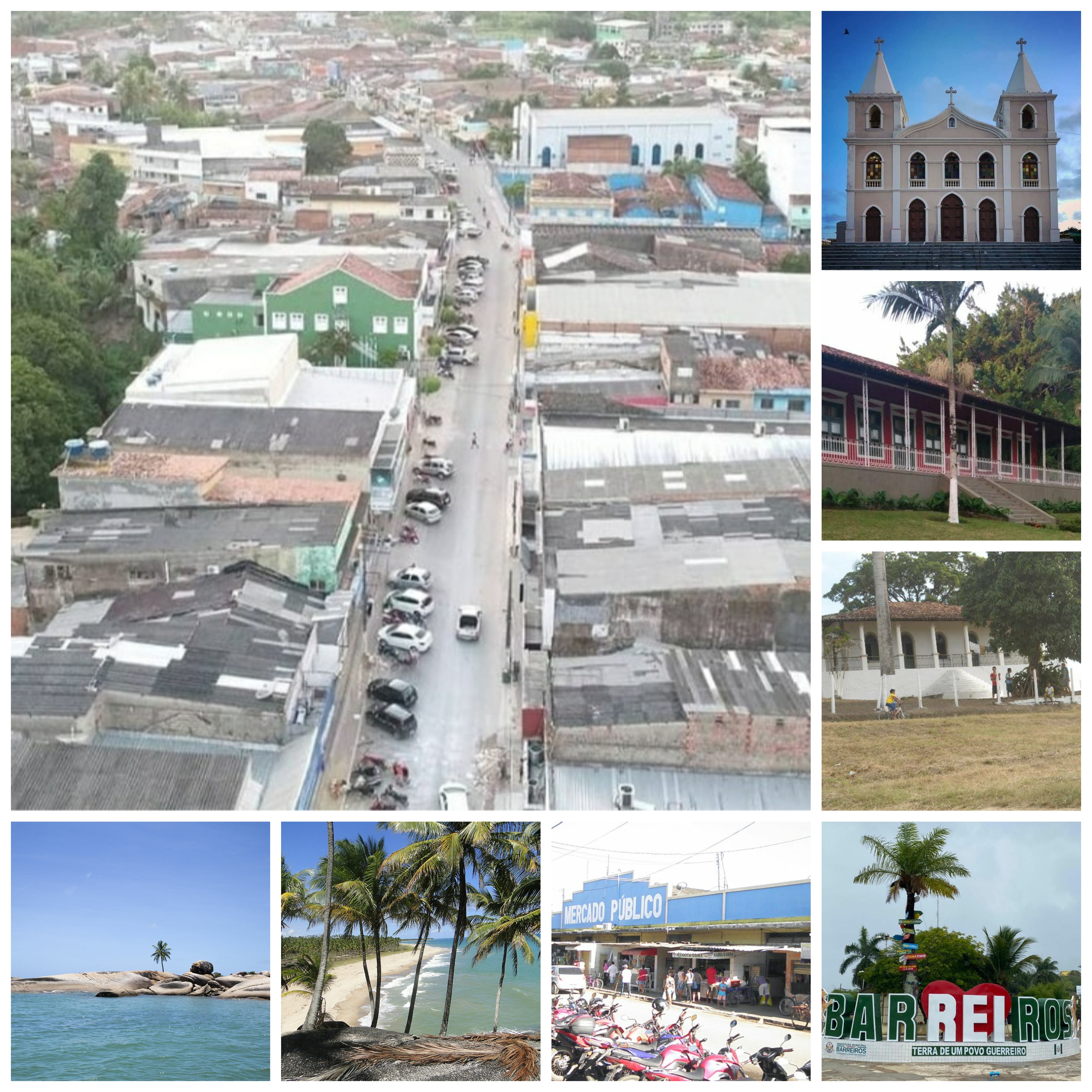

- Flag Coat of arms

- Location within Brazil
- Coordinates: 8°49′4″S 35°11′9″W
- Country: Brazil
- State: Pernambuco

Area
  - Total: 233.37 km^{2} (90.10 sq mi)
- Elevation: 22 m (72 ft)

Population (2022 Census)
  - Total: 40,121
  - Estimate (2025): 42,083
  - Density: 171.92/km^{2} (445.27/sq mi)
- Time zone: UTC−3 (BRT)

Barreiros (Central northeastern portuguese pronunciation: [bɐˈheɾu(s)]) (Barriers) is a municipality in Pernambuco with 42,083 inhabitants (2025).

== Geography ==
- State - Pernambuco
- Region - Zona da mata Pernambucana
- Boundaries - Tamandaré (N); Alagoas state and São José da Coroa Grande (S); Água Preta (W); Atlantic Ocean (E)
- Area - 233.37 km^{2}
- Elevation - 22m
- Vegetation - Forest Subperenifólia
- Clima - Hot tropical and humid
- Annual average temperature - 24.9C
- Distance to Recife - 106 km

== Economy ==
The main economic activities in Barreiros are based in commerce, tourism and agribusiness. Especially coconuts, manioc, sugarcane, bananas; and creations of cattle and buffalos.

=== Economic indicators ===
Population	GDP x(1000 R$).	GDP pc (R$)	PE
43,911	136.097	3.260	0.222%

Economy by sector 2006

Primary sector	Secondary sector	Service sector
8.68%	10.81%	80.51%

=== Health indicators ===
HDI (2000)	Hospitals (2007)	Hospitals beds (2007)	Children's Mortality every 1000 (2005)
0.635	3	211	21.1

== Notable people ==
- Irandhir Santos, actor

== See also ==
- List of municipalities in Pernambuco
