= Eunício Oliveira =

Brazilian politician and businessman

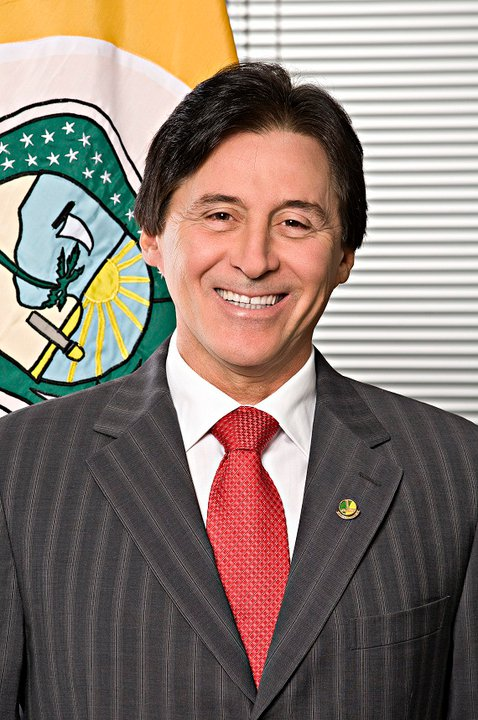

Member of the Chamber of Deputies
- Incumbent
- Assumed office 1 February 2023
- Constituency: Ceará
- In office 14 July 2005 – 1 February 2011
- Constituency: Ceará
- In office 1 February 1999 – 23 January 2004
- Constituency: Ceará

President of the Federal Senate
- In office 1 February 2017 – 1 February 2019
- Preceded by: Renan Calheiros
- Succeeded by: Davi Alcolumbre

Senator for Ceará
- In office 1 February 2011 – 1 February 2019
- Preceded by: Tasso Jereissati
- Succeeded by: Cid Gomes

Minister of Communications
- In office 23 January 2004 – 14 July 2005
- President: Luiz Inácio Lula da Silva
- Preceded by: Miro Teixeira
- Succeeded by: Hélio Costa

Personal details
- Born: 30 September 1952 (age 74) Lavras da Mangabeira, Ceará, Brazil
- Party: MDB (1972–present)
- Profession: Businessman

Eunício Lopes de Oliveira (born 30 September 1952) is a Brazilian politician and businessman. He represent Ceará in the Chamber of Deputies of Brazil since February 2023. Previously, he was a federal congressman representing Ceará from 1999 to 2011 and Federal Senator representing the state from 2011 to 2019, becoming president of the Senate of Brazil from 1 February 2017 to 2019.

He is a member of the Brazilian Democratic Movement. He was candidate running for Governor of Ceará in 2014.

He is mentioned in 2017 among the beneficiaries of bribes from the multinational JBS. In a plea bargain, Eunício was accused of having received two million reais in bribes from the Odebrecht Organization (now Novonor).

Political offices
Preceded by Miro Teixeira	Minister of Communications; 2004–2005	Succeeded by Hélio Costa
Preceded by Renan Calheiros	President of the Federal Senate; 2017–2019	Succeeded by Davi Alcolumbre
