= Gilvam Borges =

Brazilian sociologist and politician

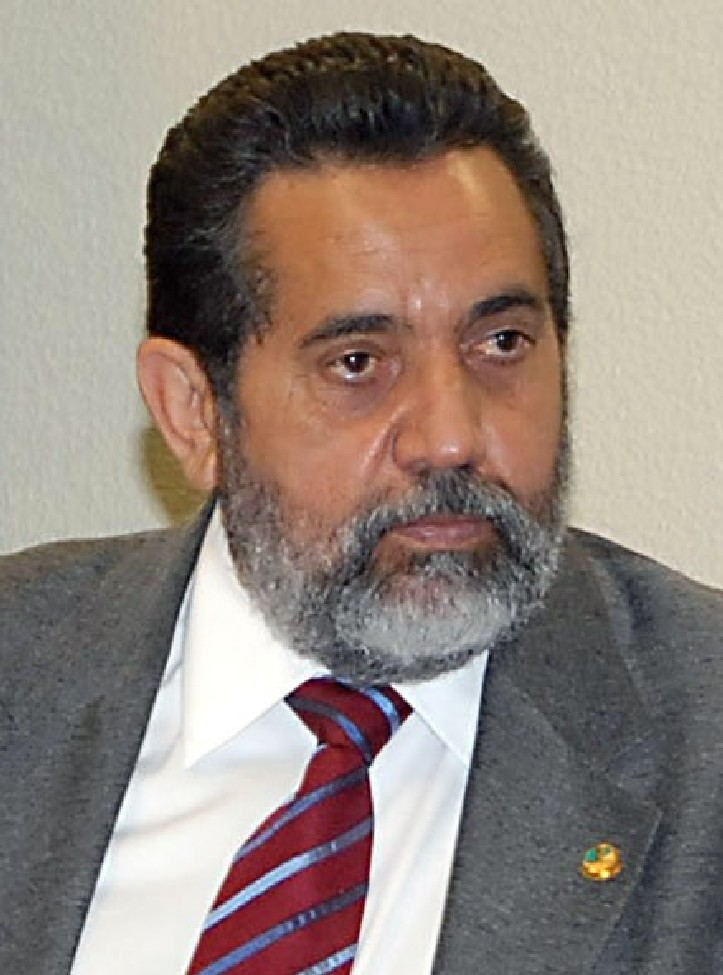
- Gilvam Borges

Senator for Amapá
- In office 1994–2002

Federal Deputy from Amapá
- In office 1990–1992

Personal details
- Born: August 1, 1958 (age 67) Brasília, Brazil
- Party: Brazilian Democratic Movement (PMDB)
- Other political affiliations: Christian Labour Party (PRN)
- Occupation: Politician, Sociologist

Gilvam Pinheiro Borges (born August 1, 1958) is a Brazilian sociologist and politician.

== Biography ==
He spent part of his youth in Brasília, after which he moved to the state of Amapá.

In 1990, he became Federal Deputy elected by PRN. Two years later he became a member of the PMDB, in which capacity he competed in the election to the Senate. In 1994 he was elected Senator for Amapá. In 1998, applied to the Governor of Amapá, but he left the race after standing 3rd place in the polls.

After the trial of Senator João Capiberibe (In a case of purchase of votes in the election of 2002), Gilvam Borges took the vacancy in the Senate again as the first-alternate of the plate of the merge.
