= President of the Federal Senate (Brazil) =

Head of the upper house of the National Congress of Brazil

- Presidente do Senado Federal
- Logo of the Senate

- Flag of the Senate

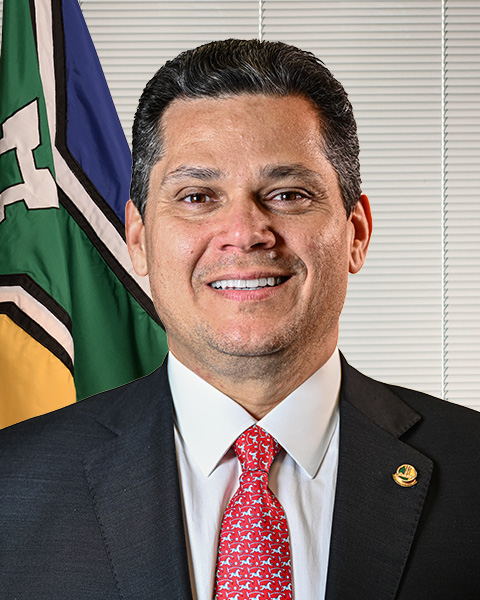
- Incumbent; Davi Alcolumbre since 1 February 2025
- National Congress; Federal Senate
- Style: Mr. President, or even simply President (informal); The Most Excellent Mr. President of the Senate/Congress (formal); His Excellency (alternative formal, diplomatic)
- Status: Presiding officer
- Residence: Lago Sul, Brasília, Federal District
- Seat: National Congress, Brasília, Federal District
- Appointer: Federal Senate; Elected by the Senate
- Term length: Two years, not eligible for re-election immediately
- Constituting instrument: Constitution of Brazil
- Formation: 25 March 1824; 202 years ago
- First holder: José Egídio Álvares de Almeida; 24 April 1826
- Succession: Third
- Salary: R$405,156 annually

The President of the Federal Senate (Portuguese: Presidente do Senado Federal), sometimes referred to as the President of the Senate (Portuguese: Presidente do Senado), is the presiding officer of the Federal Senate of Brazil.

In addition to chairing the chamber's debates and ordering its business, the President of the Federal Senate stands third in the order of presidential succession, after the Vice President of the Republic and the President of the Chamber of Deputies, but before the President of the Supreme Federal Court. The Federal Senate president is also a member of the Council of the Republic, and presides over joint sessions of the Legislative branch, in his capacity as ex officio President of the National Congress. Until 25 August 1961, this position was held ex officio by the Vice President of the Republic.

The current President of the Federal Senate is Davi Alcolumbre, of Brazil Union, elected on 1 February 2025.

== List of presidents of the Senate ==
=== Empire of Brazil (1826–1889) ===
No.	Portrait	President	Took office	Left office	Time in office	Party	Province
1	José Egídio Álvares de Almeida, Marquis of Santo Amaro	José Egídio Álvares de Almeida, Marquis of Santo Amaro (1767–1832)	May 1826	April 1827	10 or 11 months	Independent	Bahia
2	D. José Caetano da Silva Coutinho, Chaplain-Major Bishop	D. José Caetano da Silva Coutinho, Chaplain-Major Bishop (1768–1833)	1827	1832	4 or 5 years	Independent	São Paulo
3	Bento Barroso Pereira	Bento Barroso Pereira (1785–1837)	1832	8 February 1837	4 or 5 years	Independent	Minas Gerais
4	Antônio Luís Pereira da Cunha, Marquis of Inhambupe	Antônio Luís Pereira da Cunha, Marquis of Inhambupe (1760–1837)	8 February 1837	19 September 1837	223 days	Independent	Pernambuco
5	Manuel Jacinto Nogueira da Gama, Marquis of Baependi	Manuel Jacinto Nogueira da Gama, Marquis of Baependi (1765–1847)	19 September 1837	4 May 1839	1 year, 227 days	Independent	Minas Gerais
6	Diogo Antônio Feijó	Diogo Antônio Feijó (1784–1843)	4 May 1839	9 April 1840	341 days	Liberal	Rio de Janeiro
7	Francisco Vilela Barbosa, Marquis of Paranaguá	Francisco Vilela Barbosa, Marquis of Paranaguá (1769–1846)	9 April 1840	3 May 1841	1 year, 24 days	Independent	Rio de Janeiro
8	Estêvão Ribeiro de Resende, Marquis of Valença	Estêvão Ribeiro de Resende, Marquis of Valença (1777–1856)	3 May 1841	16 August 1842	1 year, 105 days	Independent	Minas Gerais
9	José da Costa Carvalho, Marquis of Monte Alegre	José da Costa Carvalho, Marquis of Monte Alegre (1796–1860)	16 August 1842	1844	1 or 2 years	Conservative	Bahia
10	João Vieira de Carvalho, Marquis of Lajes	João Vieira de Carvalho, Marquis of Lajes (1781–1847)	1844	1847	2 or 3 years	Conservative	Ceará
11	Luís José de Oliveira Mendes, Baron of Monte Santo	Luís José de Oliveira Mendes, Baron of Monte Santo (1779–1851)	1847	4 January 1851	3 or 4 years	Independent	Piauí
12	Cândido José de Araújo Viana, Marquis of Sapucaí	Cândido José de Araújo Viana, Marquis of Sapucaí (1793–1875)	4 January 1851	7 May 1854	3 years, 123 days	Independent	Minas Gerais
13	Manuel Inácio Cavalcanti de Lacerda, Baron of Pirapama	Manuel Inácio Cavalcanti de Lacerda, Baron of Pirapama (1799–1882)	8 May 1854	3 May 1861	6 years, 360 days	Conservative	Pernambuco
14	Antonio Paulino Limpo de Abreu, Viscount of Abaeté	Antonio Paulino Limpo de Abreu, Viscount of Abaeté (1798–1883)	3 May 1861	15 September 1873	12 years, 135 days	Conservative	Minas Gerais
15	José Ildefonso de Sousa Ramos, Viscount of Jaguari	José Ildefonso de Sousa Ramos, Viscount of Jaguari (1812–1883)	15 September 1873	1881	7 or 8 years	Conservative	Minas Gerais
16	João Maurício Vanderlei, Baron of Cotejipe	João Maurício Vanderlei, Baron of Cotejipe (1815–1889)	1882	1885	2 or 3 years	Conservative	Bahia
17	Brás Carneiro Nogueira da Costa e Gama, Count of Baependi	Brás Carneiro Nogueira da Costa e Gama, Count of Baependi (1812–1887)	21 May 1885	3 May 1887	1 year, 347 days	Liberal	Rio de Janeiro
18	João Lins Cansanção, Viscount of Sinimbu	João Lins Cansanção, Viscount of Sinimbu (1810–1906)	19 May 1887	2 June 1888	1 year, 14 days	Liberal	Alagoas
19	Antônio Cândido da Cruz Machado, Viscount of Serro Frio	Antônio Cândido da Cruz Machado, Viscount of Serro Frio (1820–1905)	2 June 1888	20 November 1888	171 days	Conservative	Minas Gerais
20	Paulino de Sousa	Paulino de Sousa (1834–1901)	3 May 1889	15 November 1889	196 days	Conservative	Rio de Janeiro

=== Federative Republic of Brazil (1889–present) ===
From 1889 to 1930 and from 1946 to 1961, the office of President of the Senate is held by the Vice President of Brazil.

No.	Portrait	President	Took office	Left office	Time in office	Party	Election	State
21	Floriano Peixoto	Floriano Peixoto (1839–1895)	26 February 1891	23 November 1891	270 days	Independent (Military rule)	1891	Alagoas
22	Prudente de Morais	Prudente de Morais (1841–1902)	23 November 1891	15 November 1894	2 years, 357 days	PR Federal	–	São Paulo
23	Manuel Vitorino	Manuel Vitorino (1853–1902)	15 November 1894	15 November 1898	4 years, 0 days	PR Federal	1894	Bahia
24	Francisco de Assis Rosa e Silva	Francisco de Assis Rosa e Silva (1857–1929)	15 November 1898	15 November 1902	4 years, 0 days	PR Federal	1898	Pernambuco
25	Afonso Pena	Afonso Pena (1847–1909)	15 November 1902	15 November 1906	4 years, 0 days	PRM	1902	Minas Gerais
26	Nilo Peçanha	Nilo Peçanha (1867–1924)	15 November 1906	14 June 1909	2 years, 211 days	PRF	1906	Rio de Janeiro
27	Venceslau Brás	Venceslau Brás (1868–1966)	15 November 1910	15 November 1914	4 years, 0 days	PRM	1910	Minas Gerais
28	Urbano Santos	Urbano Santos (1859–1922)	15 November 1914	15 November 1918	4 years, 0 days	-	1914	Maranhão
29	Delfim Moreira	Delfim Moreira (1868–1920)	15 November 1918	1 July 1920	1 year, 229 days	PRM	1918	Minas Gerais
30	Bueno de Paiva	Bueno de Paiva (1861–1928)	10 November 1920	15 November 1922	2 years, 5 days	PRM	–	Minas Gerais
31	Estácio Coimbra	Estácio Coimbra (1872–1937)	15 November 1922	15 November 1926	4 years, 0 days	PRB	1922	Pernambuco
32	Melo Viana	Melo Viana (1878–1954)	15 November 1926	24 October 1930	3 years, 343 days	PRM	1926	Minas Gerais
33	Antônio Garcia de Medeiros Neto	Antônio Garcia de Medeiros Neto (1887–1948)	29 April 1935	2 March 1936	308 days	-	1935	Bahia
34	Valdomiro de Barros Magalhães	Valdomiro de Barros Magalhães (1883–1944)	2 March 1936	30 April 1936	59 days	-	1936	Minas Gerais
35	Nereu Ramos	Nereu Ramos (1888–1958)	19 September 1946	31 January 1951	4 years, 134 days	PSD	1945	Santa Catarina
36	Marcondes Filho	Marcondes Filho (1892–1974)	31 January 1951	24 August 1954	3 years, 205 days	PTB	1950	São Paulo
37	Apolônio Sales	Apolônio Sales (1904–1982)	31 January 1956	31 January 1958	2 years, 0 days	PSD	1955	Pernambuco
38	João Goulart	João Goulart (1919–1976)	31 January 1958	25 August 1961	3 years, 206 days	PTB	1957; 1959	Rio Grande do Sul
39	Auro de Moura Andrade	Auro de Moura Andrade (1915–1982)	25 August 1961	22 February 1968	6 years, 181 days	PSD; ARENA	1962	São Paulo
40	Gilberto Marinho	Gilberto Marinho (1909–1985)	22 February 1968	1970	1 or 2 years	ARENA	1968	Guanabara
41	João Cleofas	João Cleofas (1899–1987)	1970	1971	0 or 1 year	ARENA	1970	Pernambuco
42	Petrônio Portella	Petrônio Portella (1925–1980)	1971	1973	1 or 2 years	ARENA	1971	Piauí
43	Filinto Müller	Filinto Müller (1900–1973)	1973	15 March 1973	0 or 2 months	ARENA	1973	Mato Grosso
44	Paulo Francisco Torres	Paulo Francisco Torres (1903–2000)	15 March 1973	15 March 1975	2 years, 0 days	ARENA	1973	Rio de Janeiro
45	Magalhães Pinto	Magalhães Pinto (1909–1996)	15 March 1975	15 March 1977	2 years, 0 days	ARENA	1975	Minas Gerais
46	Petrônio Portella	Petrônio Portella (1925–1980)	15 March 1977	15 March 1979	2 years, 0 days	ARENA	1977	Piauí
47	Luís Viana Filho	Luís Viana Filho (1908–1990)	15 March 1979	15 March 1981	2 years, 0 days	ARENA; PDS	1979	Bahia
48	Jarbas Passarinho	Jarbas Passarinho (1920–2016)	15 March 1981	1 February 1983	1 year, 323 days	PDS	1981	Pará
49	Nilo Coelho	Nilo Coelho (1920–1983)	1 February 1983	11 November 1983	283 days	PDS	1983	Pernambuco
50	Moacir Dalla	Moacir Dalla (1927–2006)	11 November 1983	15 March 1985	1 year, 124 days	PDS	1983	Espírito Santo
51	José Fragelli	José Fragelli (1915–2010)	15 March 1985	15 March 1987	2 years, 0 days	MDB	1985	Mato Grosso do Sul
52	Humberto Lucena	Humberto Lucena (1928–1998)	15 March 1987	15 March 1989	2 years, 0 days	MDB	1987	Paraíba
53	Nelson Carneiro	Nelson Carneiro (1910–1996)	15 March 1989	15 March 1991	2 years, 0 days	MDB	1989	Rio de Janeiro
54	Mauro Benevides	Mauro Benevides (born 1930)	15 March 1991	28 August 1993	2 years, 166 days	MDB	1991	Ceará
55	Humberto Lucena	Humberto Lucena (1928–1998)	28 August 1993	2 February 1995	1 year, 158 days	MDB	1993	Paraíba
56	José Sarney	José Sarney (born 1930)	2 February 1995	2 February 1997	2 years, 0 days	MDB	1995	Amapá
57	Antônio Carlos Magalhães	Antônio Carlos Magalhães (1927–2007)	2 February 1997	14 February 2001	4 years, 12 days	PFL	1997; 1999	Bahia
58	Jader Barbalho	Jader Barbalho (born 1944)	14 February 2001	19 September 2001	217 days	MDB	2001	Pará
–	Edison Lobão	Edison Lobão (born 1936); Acting	19 September 2001	20 September 2001	1 day	MDB	–	Maranhão
59	Ramez Tebet	Ramez Tebet (1936–2006)	20 September 2001	2 February 2003	1 year, 135 days	MDB	2001	Mato Grosso do Sul
60	José Sarney	José Sarney (born 1930)	2 February 2003	2 February 2005	2 years, 0 days	MDB	2003	Amapá
61	Renan Calheiros	Renan Calheiros (born 1955)	2 February 2005	14 October 2007	2 years, 254 days	MDB	2005; 2007	Alagoas
–	Tião Viana	Tião Viana (born 1961)	14 October 2007	12 December 2007	59 days	PT	–	Acre
62	Garibaldi Alves Filho	Garibaldi Alves Filho (born 1947)	12 December 2007	2 February 2009	1 year, 52 days	MDB	2007	Rio Grande do Norte
63	José Sarney	José Sarney (born 1930)	2 February 2009	1 February 2013	3 years, 365 days	MDB	2009; 2011	Amapá
64	Renan Calheiros	Renan Calheiros (born 1955)	1 February 2013	1 February 2017	4 years, 0 days	MDB	2013; 2015	Alagoas
65	Eunício Oliveira	Eunício Oliveira (born 1952)	1 February 2017	1 February 2019	2 years, 0 days	MDB	2017	Ceará
66	Davi Alcolumbre	Davi Alcolumbre (born 1977)	1 February 2019	1 February 2021	2 years, 0 days	DEM	2019	Amapá
67	Rodrigo Pacheco	Rodrigo Pacheco (born 1976)	1 February 2021	1 February 2025	4 years, 0 days	DEM; PSD	2021; 2023	Minas Gerais
68	Davi Alcolumbre	Davi Alcolumbre (born 1977)	1 February 2025	Incumbent	1 year, 245 days	UNIÃO	2025	Amapá

== See also ==
- President of the Chamber of Deputies of Brazil
