= Veneziano Vital do Rêgo =

Brazilian politician

- Official portrait

Senator for Paraíba
- Incumbent
- Assumed office 1 February 2019

First Vice President of the Senate
- Incumbent
- Assumed office 2 February 2021
- Preceded by: Antonio Anastasia

Member of the Chamber of Deputies
- In office 1 February 2015 – 31 January 2019
- Constituency: Paraíba

Mayor of Campina Grande
- In office 1 January 2005 – 1 January 2013

Member of the Municipal Chamber of Campina Grande
- In office 1 January 1997 – 31 December 2004
- Constituency: At-large

Personal details
- Born: Veneziano Vital do Rêgo Segundo Neto; 17 July 1970 (age 56) Campina Grande, Paraíba, Brazil
- Party: PST (1992–1993); PDT (1993–2004); MDB (2004–2018); PSB (2018–2021); MDB (2021–present)
- Profession: Lawyer

Veneziano Vital do Rêgo Segundo Neto (born 17 July 1970) is a lawyer and a federal senator of Brazil representing the state of Paraíba. Since February 2021, he has served as the first vice president of the Federal Senate. Vital do Rêgo is a member of the Brazilian Democratic Movement (MDB).

== Personal life ==
Veneziano Vital do Rêgo is the son of former federal deputy Antônio Vital do Rêgo and Nilda Gondim. He is also the brother of federal deputy Vital do Rêgo Filho.

== Political career ==
Vital do Rêgo started his political career in 1996. He served two consecutive terms as a councillor in Campina Grande. In 2004, he was elected mayor of the city. In 2008, Vital do Rêgo was reelected for another term.

In the 2014 Brazilian general election, Vital do Rêgo was elected federal deputy. He received the second most votes in his state. In 2016, Vital do Rêgo lost in the election for mayor of Campina Grande.

In 2018, Vital do Rêgo was elected senator in Paraíba. In April, he joined the Brazilian Socialist Party (PSB).

In February 2021, Vital do Rêgo was elected vice president of the Federal Senate. 40 votes were cast for him while 33 votes were cast for Senator Lucas Barreto (PSD).

Vital do Rêgo voted for the impeachment of Dilma Rousseff.

Vital do Rêgo was a candidate for governor of Paraíba in the 2022 elections.

In December 2022, Vital do Rêgo was unanimously elected vice-president of the Tribunal de Contas da União (Federal Court of Audits) and magistrate of the Court of Auditors.
