= Rodrigo Pacheco (politician) =

Brazilian politician

His Excellency Rodrigo Pacheco
- Official portrait

Justice of the Federal Court of Accounts
- Incumbent
- Assumed office 30 September 2026
- Appointed by: Federal Senate
- Preceded by: Bruno Dantas

Senator for Minas Gerais
- In office 1 February 2019 – 30 September 2026
- Preceded by: Aécio Neves
- Succeeded by: Renzo Braz

President of the Federal Senate
- In office 1 February 2021 – 1 February 2025
- Preceded by: Davi Alcolumbre
- Succeeded by: Davi Alcolumbre

Member of the Chamber of Deputies
- In office 1 February 2015 – 1 February 2019
- Constituency: Minas Gerais

Personal details
- Born: Rodrigo Otavio Soares Pacheco; 3 November 1976 (age 49) Porto Velho, Rondônia, Brazil
- Party: PSB (2026–present)
- Other political affiliations: MDB (2010–2018); DEM (2018–2021); PSD (2021–2026)
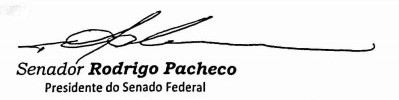
- Signature

Rodrigo Otavio Soares Pacheco (Portuguese pronunciation: [ʁoˈdɾigu oˈtaviu soaɾis, ˈswa-, -ɾiʃ, paˈʃɛku]; born 3 November 1976) is a Brazilian politician and lawyer, serving as Justice of the Federal Court of Accounts (TCU) since 2026. He previously served as the Senator for Minas Gerais from 2019 to 2026, and as President of the Federal Senate and of the National Congress of Brazil from 2021 to 2025.

Pacheco, a member of the Brazilian Socialist Party, previously served in the Chamber of Deputies from 2015 to 2019.

== Personal life ==
Pacheco was born to Helio Cota Pacheco and Marta Maria Soares in Porto Velho, Rondônia, but moved to his parents' city of origin Passos, Minas Gerais. Prior to becoming a politician Pacheco worked as a lawyer, with emphasis of criminal justice prosecution.

== Political career ==
Pacheco voted in favor of the impeachment motion of then-president Dilma Rousseff, and he would abstain in a vote for a similar corruption investigation into Rousseff's successor Michel Temer. He voted in favor of the 2017 Brazilian labor reforms. On 22 October 2021, Pacheco announced affiliation to PSD as presidential pre-candidate to 2022 Brazilian general election.

Pacheco authored Bill 5516/2019, which eventually saw the creation of the Sociedade Anônima do Futebol public limited company model for Brazilian football clubs. The bill was based on a study by the lawyers Rodrigo Monteiro de Castro and José Francisco Manssur that analyzed the Brazilian football business structure and compared it to foreign models.

Political offices
Preceded by Davi Alcolumbre	President of the Federal Senate; 2021–2025	Succeeded by Davi Alcolumbre
