= Davi Alcolumbre =

Brazilian politician

His Excellency Davi Alcolumbre
- Official portrait

President of the Federal Senate
- Incumbent
- Assumed office 1 February 2025
- Preceded by: Rodrigo Pacheco
- In office 2 February 2019 – 1 February 2021
- Preceded by: Eunício Oliveira
- Succeeded by: Rodrigo Pacheco

Senator for Amapá
- Incumbent
- Assumed office 1 February 2015
- Preceded by: José Sarney

General-Secretary of Brazil Union
- Incumbent
- Assumed office 29 February 2024
- President: Antônio Rueda
- Preceded by: ACM Neto

Member of the Chamber of Deputies
- In office 1 February 2003 – 1 February 2015
- Constituency: Amapá

Councillor of Macapá
- In office 1 January 2001 – 1 February 2003
- Constituency: At-large

Personal details
- Born: Davi Samuel Alcolumbre Tobelem; 19 June 1977 (age 49) Macapá, Amapá, Brazil
- Party: UNIÃO (2022–present)
- Other political affiliations: PDT (1999–2006); DEM (2006–2022)
- Profession: Politician, merchant

Davi Samuel Alcolumbre Tobelem (Brazilian Portuguese: [daˈvi sɐmuˈɛw awkoˈlũbɾi toˈbɛlẽj̃]; born 19 June 1977) is a Brazilian politician member of Brazil Union (UNIÃO). He is Senator for Amapá and has been President of the Federal Senate since 1 February 2025, having previously served in the same role from 2019 to 2021. He is also a former President of the National Congress of Brazil.

Of Moroccan ancestry, Alcolumbre was the first Jew to hold the office of President of the Senate in the history of Brazil.

== Biography ==
Davi Alcolumbre was born in Macapá, in 1977, the son of Samuel José Tobelem and Julia Peres Alcolumbre, who were cousins. His family is of Sephardic Jewish origin and immigrated from Morocco to Brazil, initially to the state of Pará. His paternal grandparents were José Tobelem and Maey Alcolumbre Tobelem, both Moroccan-born. His maternal grandfather was Isaac Alcolumbre, born in Belém, Brazil, to Moroccan immigrants from Tangier.

He was City Councillor in Macapá from 2001 to 2003, when he was member of the Democratic Labor Party (PDT). In 2002, he was elect Federal Deputy for the state of Amapá, being re-elect in 2006 and 2010. Currently, he is member of Democrats, party which Alcolumbre was member of the National Directory and also the youth wing.

Davi Alcolumbre was candidate for the Senate in the 2014 elections, being elect with 36.26% of the valid voted, defeating the favorite former Senator Gilvam Borges. He took office on 1 February 2015. Alcolumbre is one of the 13 senators who didn't graduate on college.

In 2015, he was elect Chair of the Senate Regional Development and Tourism Committee.

In July 2017, voted against the removal of senator Aécio Neves in the Senate Ethics Council.

In October 2017, voted to keep Aécio in office, defeating a decision of the First Class of the Supreme Federal Court in a lawsuit which Aécio was accused of corruption and obstruction of justice for asking for R$ 2 million (US$ 626,684.21 in 2017) to the owner of JBS Joesley Batista.

In 2019, as the only member of the previous Senate Director Board, began the Presidency of the House and, on 1 February, articulated to preside the session which would choose the new President being, however, deprecated by the senior member of the Senate, senator José Maranhão (MDB) of the leading of the session, which the main rivals were Alcolumbre himself (support by Onyx Lorenzoni, Chief of Staff, and the Democratas party) and senator Renan Calheiros (MDB).

On 2 February, Alcolumbre was elected in the first round, with 42 votes, the new President of the Federal Senate, due to the support of opponents of Renan Calheiros and part of the supporting base of President Jair Bolsonaro.

On 18 March 2020, Alcolumbre tested positive for COVID-19.

Political offices
| Preceded by Eunício Oliveira | President of the Federal Senate; 2019–2021 | Succeeded by Rodrigo Pacheco |
| Preceded by Rodrigo Pacheco | President of the Federal Senate; 2025–present | Incumbent |
Party political offices
| Preceded by ACM Neto | General-Secretary of Brazil Union; 2024–present | Incumbent |
Lines of succession
| Preceded by Hugo Motta as President of the Chamber of Deputies | Brazilian presidential line of succession 3rd in line as President of the Federal Senate | Followed by Edson Fachin as President of the Supreme Federal Court |
Order of precedence
| Preceded by Foreign ambassadors | Brazilian order of precedence 5th in order as President of the National Congress | Followed by Hugo Motta as President of the Chamber of Deputies |
