= Marcela Temer =

First Lady of Brazil from 2016 to 2019

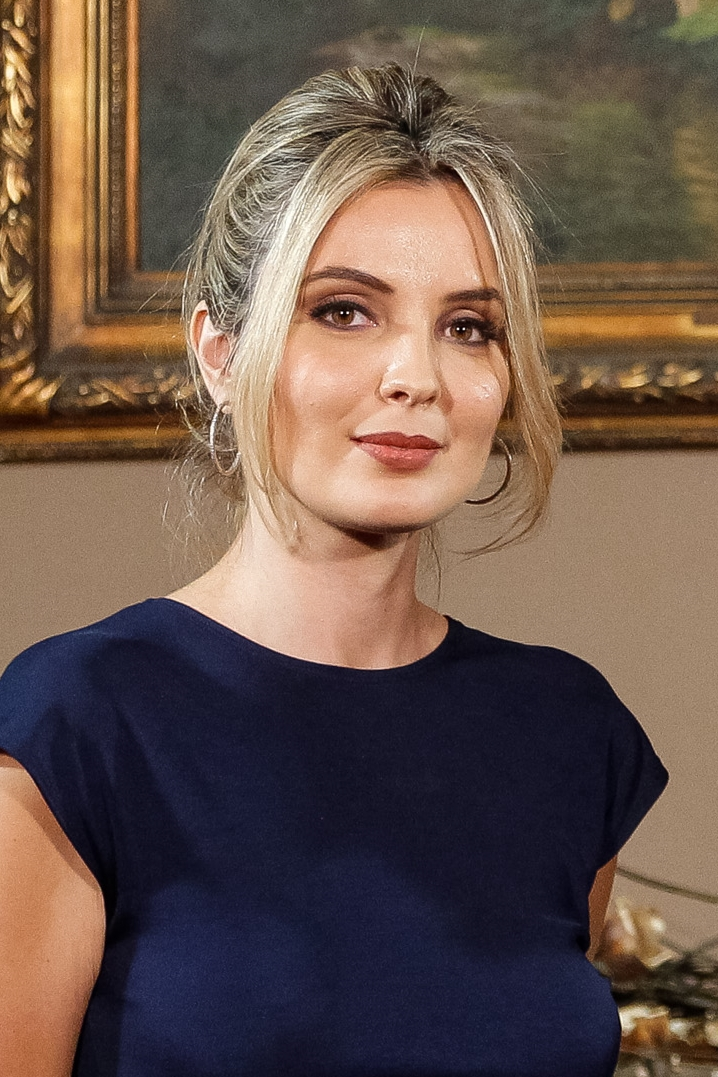
- Temer in 2016

First Lady of Brazil
- In role 31 August 2016 – 1 January 2019
- President: Michel Temer
- Preceded by: Marisa Letícia Lula da Silva
- Succeeded by: Michelle Bolsonaro

Second Lady of Brazil
- In role 1 January 2011 – 31 August 2016
- Vice President: Michel Temer
- Preceded by: Mariza Gomes
- Succeeded by: Paula Mourão

Personal details
- Born: Marcela Tedeschi de Araújo; 16 May 1983 (age 43) Paulínia, São Paulo, Brazil
- Party: MDB
- Spouse: Michel Temer (m. 2003)
- Children: Michel (b. 2009)
- Education: FADISP

Marcela Tedeschi de Araújo Temer (born 16 May 1983) is the wife of Michel Temer, the 37th President of Brazil, She served as the 36th First Lady of Brazil, from 31 August 2016 until 1 January 2019. She also served as the Second Lady of Brazil from 2011 to 2016. As first lady, she worked on social policies for children, having been an Ambassador for the Happy Child Program.

Marcela was born and raised in Paulínia. She graduated from the Autonomous Faculty of Law (FADISP). She was Miss Paulínia and Vice-Miss São Paulo.

== Early life ==
Marcela Tedeschi Araújo was born on 16 May 1983 in Paulínia, São Paulo, to Carlos Antônio de Araújo and Norma Tedeschi. After graduating from the Escola Estadual Porphyrio da Paz, in her native Paulínia, Marcela worked as a receptionist for the newspaper O Momento. In 2002, at the age of nineteen, she won the title of Miss Paulínia, then moving on to share the state title as Miss São Paulo.

== Public life ==
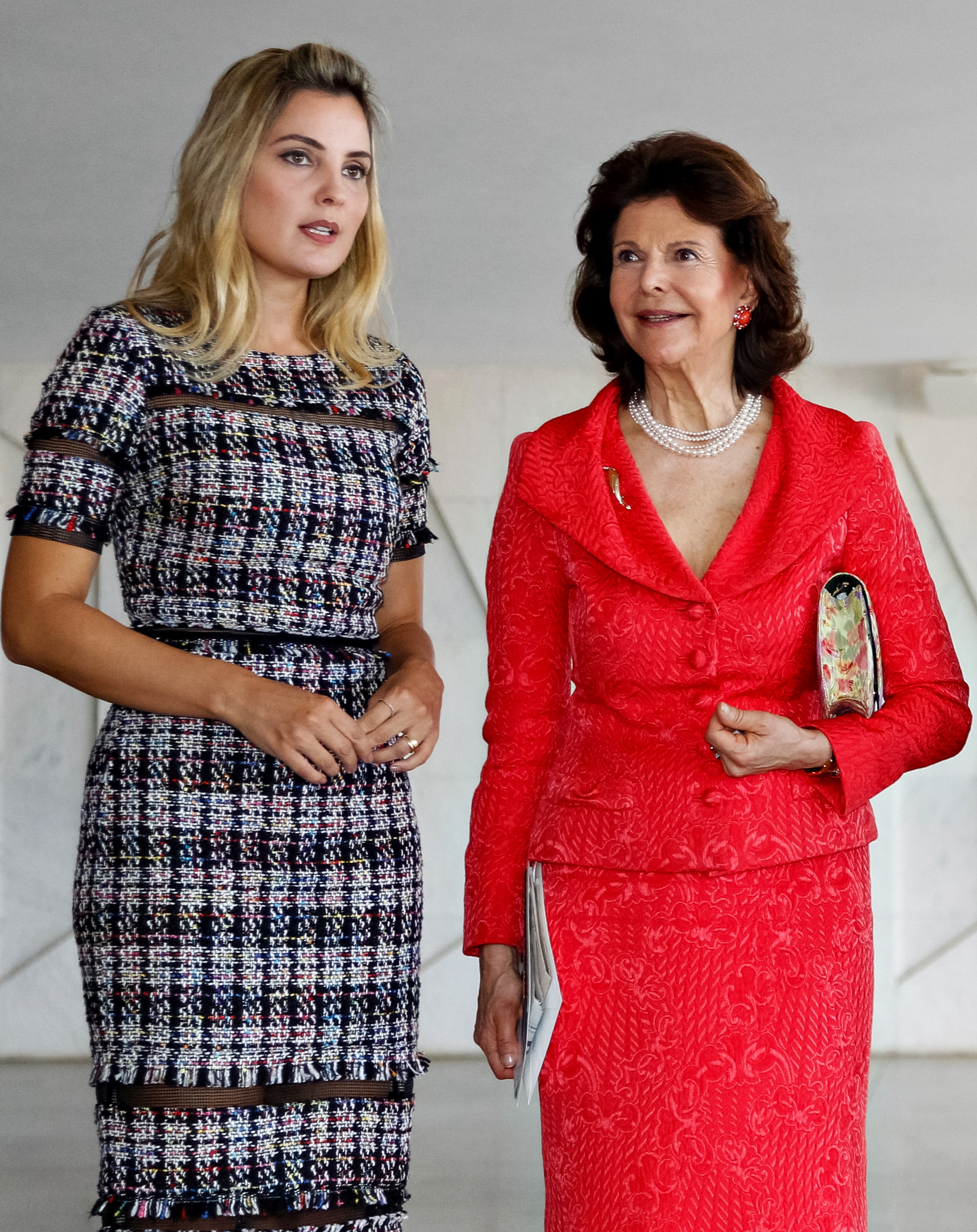
Marcela with Queen Silvia of Sweden in the Itamaraty Palace, Brasília, April 2017

In 2003, she married Michel Temer, with whom she has a son, Michel Filho.

In 2002, Marcela accompanied her uncle Geraldo, a Paulínia municipal employee, to the annual political convention of the Brazilian Democratic Movement Party (PMDB). While there, Marcela met Michel Temer, a politician forty-three years her senior. The couple married on 26 July 2003, in a small ceremony.

In 2009, Marcela graduated with a law degree from Fadisp, a private school in São Paulo. In an interview, Marcela says that she never took the licensing exam because of the birth of the couple's son Michel (often referred to by his nickname "Michelzinho").

In the 2011 presidential inauguration, she drew national and international attention for her beauty and 43 year age difference with her husband, which had led her throughout his terms as vice president to remain reserved and out of the spotlight until Michel became president, when she took charge of social causes.

== Controversies ==
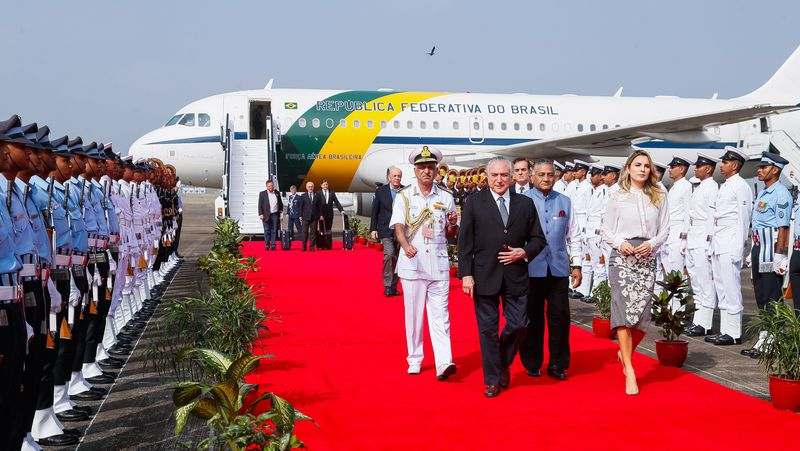
Michel and Marcela Temer attend the 2016 BRICS summit in Goa, India

On 12 May 2016, Brazilian police arrested three people for attempting to extort money from Marcela after they hacked her personal Internet account.

The Brazilian weekly magazine Veja featured a profile of Marcela Temer in their 18 April 2016 issue. The title, "Bela, recatada, e do lar'" (translated as "beautiful, demure, and a housewife") portrayed Marcela as a feminine helpmate. Almost immediately, Brazilian feminists, outraged by the transition from the country's first female president Dilma Rousseff to a more conservative government, responded on social media by posting memes of themselves that questioned Marcela as a role model for Brazilian womanhood.

== See also ==
- First Lady of Brazil

Honorary titles
Preceded by Mariza Gomes	Second Lady of Brazil; 2011–2016	Vacant Title next held by Paula Mourão
Vacant Title last held by Marisa Letícia Lula da Silva	First Lady of Brazil; 2016–2019	Succeeded by Michelle Bolsonaro
