= Anita Peçanha =

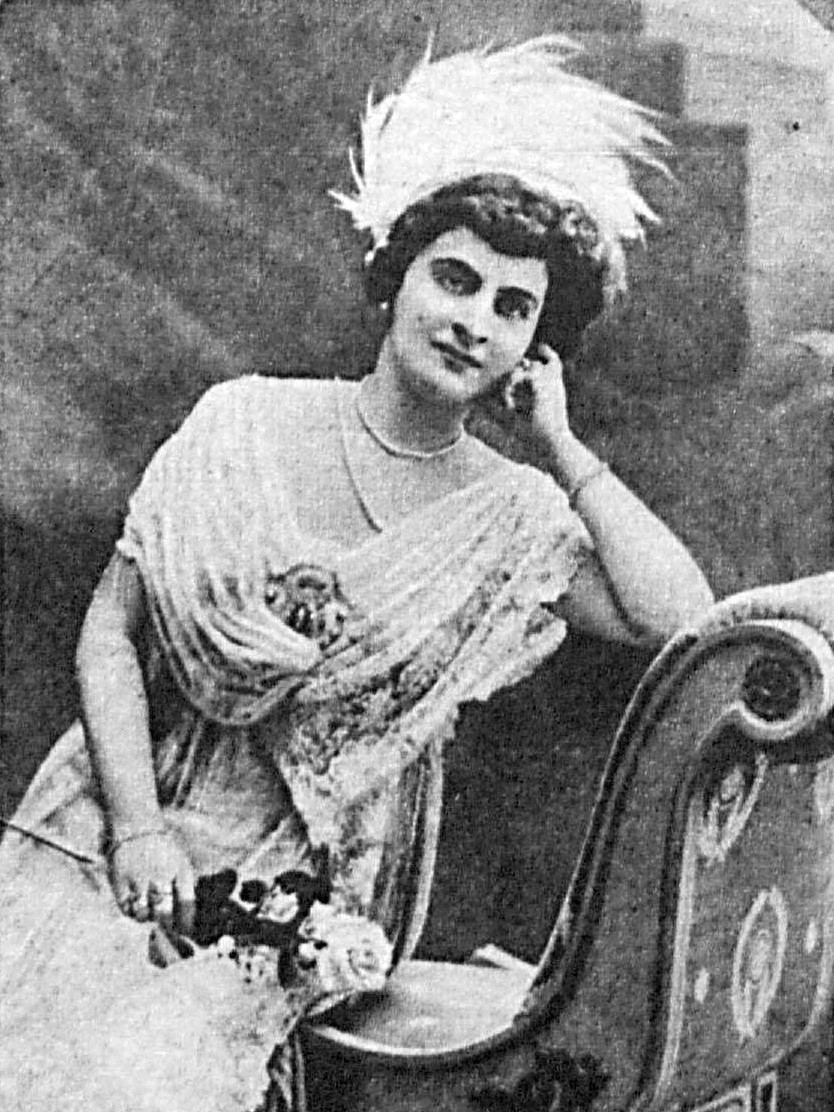

First Lady of Brazil
- In office 14 June 1909 – 15 November 1910
- President: Nilo Peçanha
- Preceded by: Guilhermina Pena
- Succeeded by: Orsina da Fonseca

Personal details
- Born: 21 March 1876 Campos dos Goytacazes, Rio de Janeiro, Empire of Brazil
- Died: 9 April 1960 (aged 84) Rio de Janeiro, Federal District, Brazil
- Spouse: Nilo Peçanha
- Parents: João Belizário Soares de Sousa (father); Anna Rachel Netto Ribeiro (mother)

Anna de Castro Belisário Soares de Sousa Peçanha (Campos dos Goytacazes, 21 March 1876 — Rio de Janeiro, 9 April 1960) was the wife of the 7th president of Brazil, Nilo Peçanha and the first lady of Brazil from 1909 to 1910. She was also the second lady of Brazil from 1906 until the death of Afonso Pena in 1909, and the first lady of the state of Rio de Janeiro for two periods, between 1903 and 1906 and between 1914 and 1917.

== Biography ==
=== Family and early years ===
Anna, whose nickname was Anita, was born on 21 March 1876 in a Brazilian aristocratic family, in Campos dos Goytacazes.

Her father, lawyer João Belizário Soares de Sousa, was a cousin of the viscount of Uruguay and son of Bernardo Belizário Soares de Sousa, counselor of the Empire. His mother, D. Anna Rachel Netto Ribeiro de Castro, was the daughter of José Ribeiro de Castro, Viscount of Santa Rita, being, therefore, paternal granddaughter of the first Baron of Santa Rita and mother of the Baron and Viscountess of Muriaé.

She was small in stature, but elegant and captivatingly beautiful. His high forehead and firm gait revealed a rare personality. Maybe a little bit of pride. [...] His father had given him an exquisite education. She had learned piano from the famous Italian teacher Carlos Reinolds; her governess Augusta Jaeger, illustrious teacher of Hamburg, teaching her German and French and her exercise in horseback riding. She was a camper from the heart of Campos, as she was born in the manor of her maternal grandfather, Visconde de Santa Rita on 7 de Setembro street.

— Brígido Tinoco

=== Marriage and children ===
On December 6, 1895, at the Church of São João Batista da Lagoa, in Rio de Janeiro, Anita married Nilo Procópio Peçanha, at the hands of Father Pelinca, former vicar of the parish of São Salvador de Campos dos Goytacazes. The honeymoon was at the White Hotel, in Alto da Boa Vista. The marriage was a social scandal, as she left her paternal house to live with an aunt and, thus, be able to marry Nilo Peçanha, a poor guy and mulatto, although promising politician. Anita and Nilo had four children: Iris, Nilo, Zulma and Mário Nilo, but they all died shortly after being born.

There were many social reprisals suffered by the couple, the Baroness of Monte de Cedro (Francisca Antonia Ribeiro de Castro Carneiro da Silva) cut ties with her cousin and best friend, being followed by the Viscountess of Quissamã (Anna Francisca Ribeiro de Castro Carneiro da Silva) and by the Countess of Araruama (Rachel Francisca de Castro Netto Carneiro da Silva).

On one occasion when Anita was staying at Fazenda Bertioga, a mountain region in Macaé, owned by her cousin Julia Nogueira da Gama e Gavinho, she was delighted with the talent of the camp cook Luís Cipriano Gomes, enticing her relative's servant, taking him to Rio de Janeiro. Cipriano served the Peçanha couple at Palácio do Catete, being the maternal grandfather of Angenor de Oliveira, the famous Cartola.

== First Lady of Brazil ==
Anita became First Lady of Brazil with the inauguration of Nilo Peçanha as President of the Republic on June 14, 1909, who, as vice-president, took over due to the death of President Affonso Penna caused by a pneumonia.

She was an active, participative woman, attentive to the obligations that the social and political world proposed to her, having been an unconditional companion, in addition to guaranteeing the success of Nilo Peçanha's political career.

As First Lady, Anita and her husband spent a single summer at the Rio Negro Palace, for fifty days between December 1909 and January 1910. President of Brazil, was due to an illness that affected the First Lady.

The Tribuna de Petrópolis reported the fact in the column "Echoes and Facts":

The Excellency Dr. Nilo Peçanha, illustrious President of the Republic, will come to this city so that his worthy consort Madame Anita Peçanha can convalesce here from the serious illness that the distinguished lady has just been affected by [...] Your Excellency, as we have already reported, he will only go down to Rio de Janeiro, to give public hearings, carrying out the collective dispatches of the Ministry, in this city, at Rio Negro Palace.

— Tribuna de Petrópolis.

On March 7, 1910, Nilo and Anita Peçanha received representatives of the diplomatic corps who lived in the Rio de Janeiro mountains of Petrópolis at the Palace.

On April 2 of the same year, the Peçanha couple received about three hundred guests in the halls of the Rio Negro Palace, as a result of a party in honor of Petropolitan society, among which were Ministers of State, members of the diplomatic corps and important families. The Fire Brigade band and the National Mariners orchestra played at the social event promoted by the President and First Lady of Brazil.

== Death ==
Anita outlived her late husband thirty-six years, dying on 9 April 1960, at the age of eighty-four.

== See also ==
- List of first ladies of Brazil
- List of second ladies of Brazil

Preceded by Guilhermina Penna	7th First Lady of Brazil; 1909 — 1910	Succeeded by Orsina da Fonseca
Preceded by Guilhermina Penna	4th Second Lady of Brazil; 1906 — 1909	Succeeded by Maria Pereira Gomes
Preceded by Julieta Botelho; Luísa Costa	First Lady of the State of Rio de Janeiro; 1914 — 1917; 1903 — 1906	Succeeded by Laurecênia Guimarães; Julieta Botelho
