= Paula Mourão =

Second Lady of Brazil from 2019 to 2023

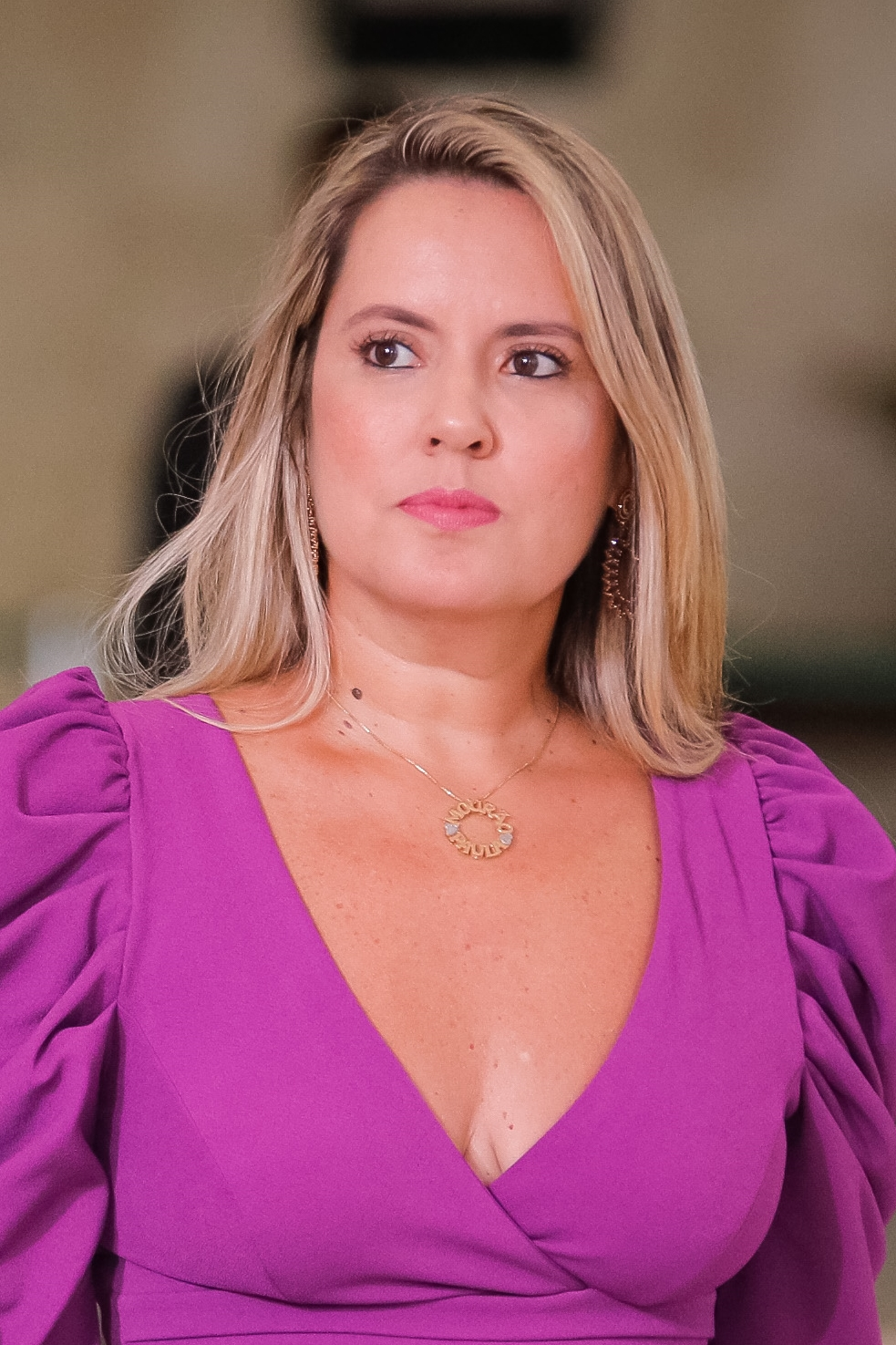
- Mourão in 2020

Second Lady of Brazil
- In role 1 January 2019 – 1 January 2023
- Vice President: Hamilton Mourão
- Preceded by: Marcela Temer
- Succeeded by: Lu Alckmin

Personal details
- Born: Ana Paula Leandro de Oliveira; 2 May 1976 (age 50) Rio de Janeiro, Brazil
- Party: Republicans (2022–present)
- Spouse: Hamilton Mourão (m. 2018)
- Children: 2

Military service
- Allegiance: Brazil
- Branch/service: Brazilian Army
- Years of service: 2010–2018
- Rank: 1st Lieutenant

Ana Paula Leandro de Oliveira Mourão (née Leandro de Oliveira; born 2 May 1976) is a Brazilian lawyer and military officer who served as Second Lady of Brazil from 2019 to 2023. She's the second spouse of the 25th Vice President of Brazil, Hamilton Mourão.

== Biography ==
=== Personal life ===
Paula is carioca, daughter of lawyer Ivan Couto de Oliveira and the company administrator Alice Leandro Couto de Oliveira. She has two children from a previous relationship.

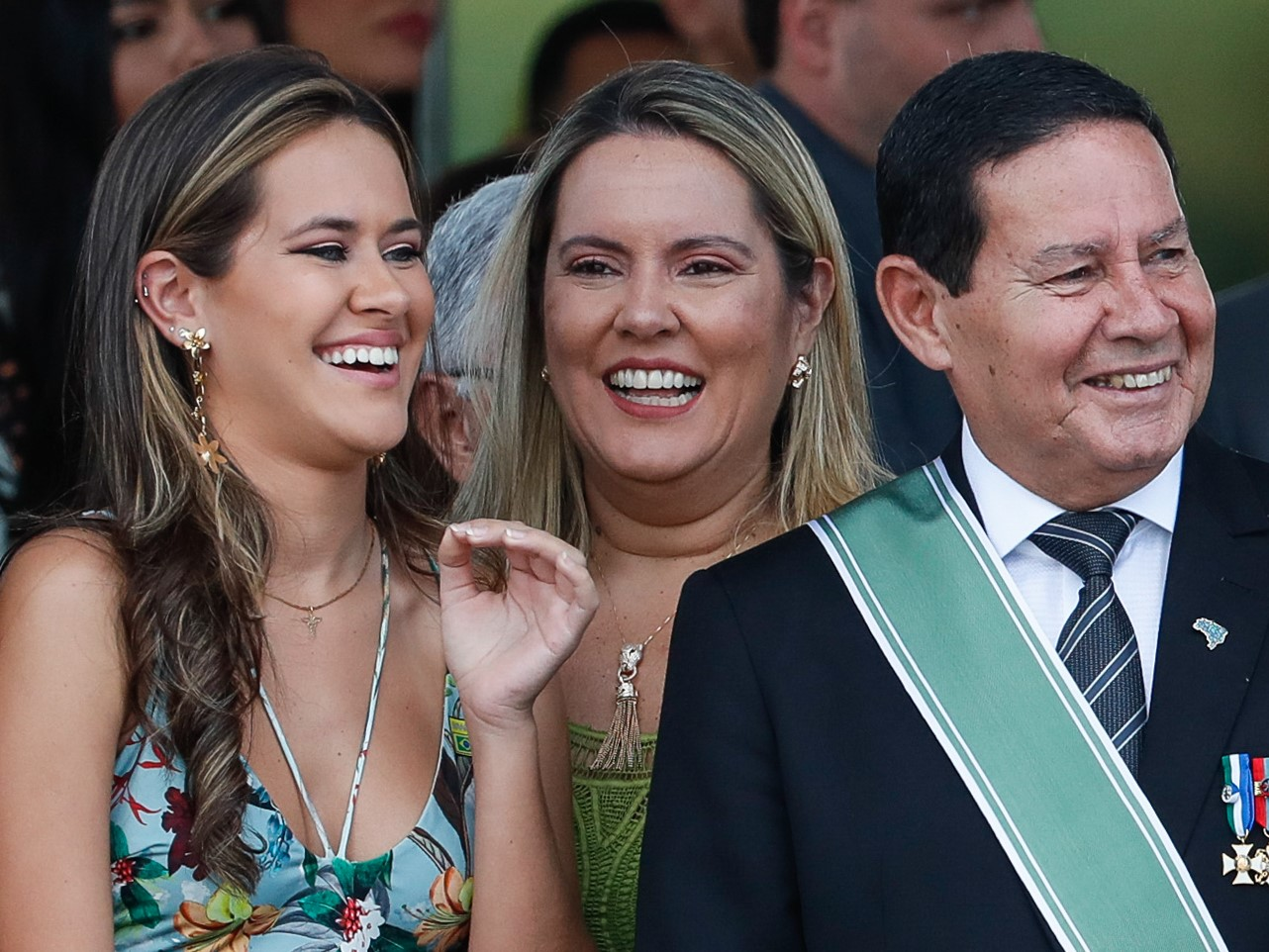
Paula with her daughter Eduarda and VP Hamilton Mourão during the Independence Day parade in 2019.

=== Marriage ===
She met General Mourão in the Army, while she was 1st Lieutenant. They engaged in a relationship and, after a year, they married on 11 October 2018, travelling to Penedo, Rio de Janeiro for their honeymoon.

=== Career ===
Began her military career in the Army in 2010, reaching the office of 1st Lieutenant. After her marriage in 2018, she asked to leave and began a new journey in the Savings and Loan Association (Poupex), of the Army Secretariat of Finances. Besides that, she is Bachelor of Laws and acts in the professional area. She's trilingual in English and Spanish.

== Second Lady of Brazil ==
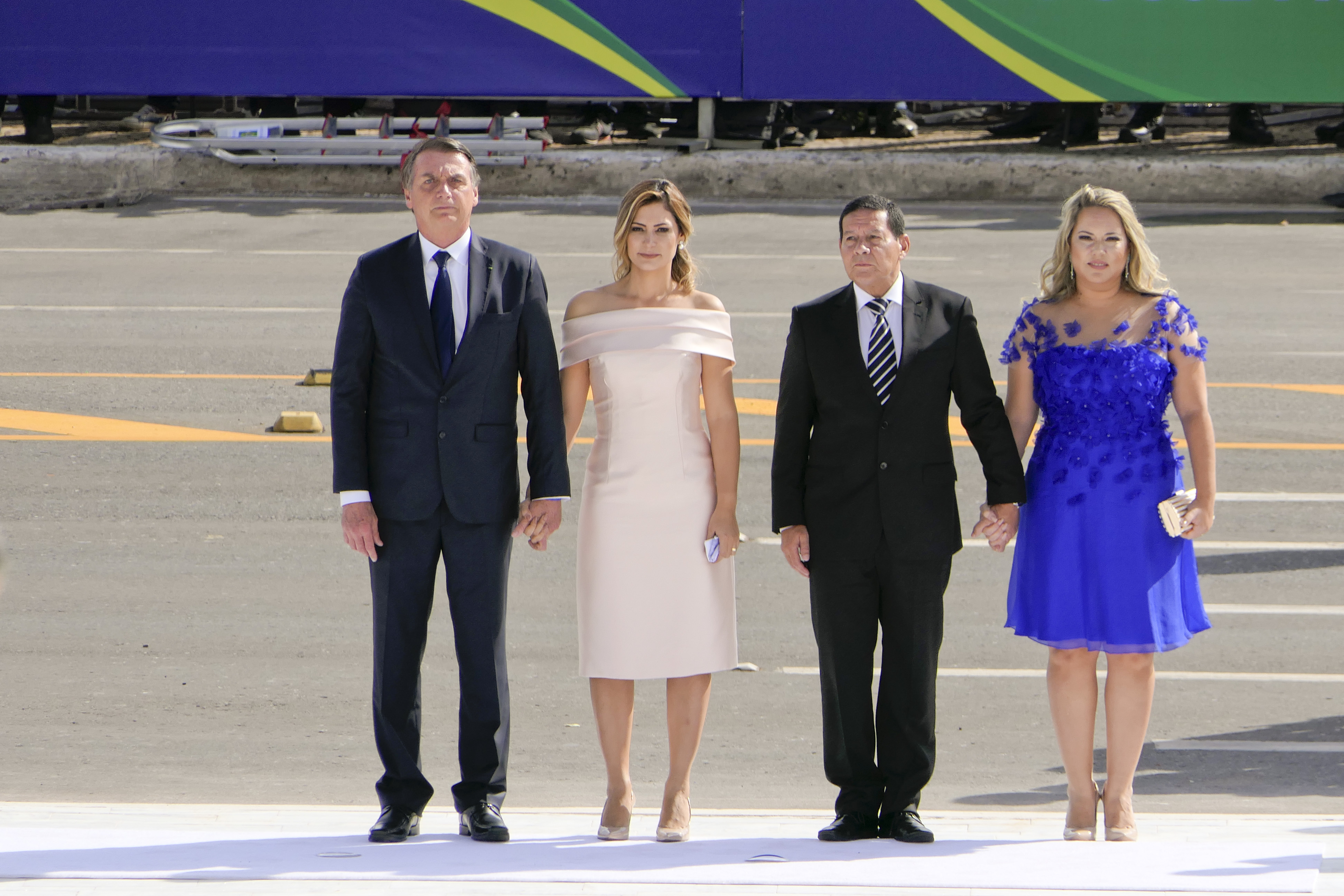
President Bolsonaro, First Lady Michelle, VP Mourão and Second Lady Paula in the 2019 presidential inauguration.

During the inauguration of President Jair Bolsonaro, she wear a blue dress as a tribute to the flag of Brazil made by stylist Vivian Kherlakian, with an estimated value of R$ 15,000 (US$3,623).

She participated in an event hosted by the ambassadress of Gabon, Julie Pascale Moudoute-Bell, to raise funds for the Pestalozzi Association of Brasília, through the sell of many handmaid pieces of the African country.

On 12 April 2019, she received, along with Vice President Mourão in the Itamaraty Palace, the visit of State of the Vice President of Argentina, Gabriela Michetti, where they talked about the fortification of the production of food from Mercosur to the world.

In interview to Andréia Sadi, of GloboNews, on 22 May 2019, Mourão declared being an admirer of former First Lady of the United States, Michelle Obama, affirming that "her intelligence is very great". Questioned about one of her husband's statements saying that "abortion is about the woman", she affirmed that she agrees of the same thought and says it's the right of the woman "if she wants or doesn't want". She claimed an aspect in common with First Lady Michelle Bolsonaro: the social cause. The journalist asked what was the main problem of the country in her point of view, and Mourão answered:

I think that this poor population is really from the streets. These people are still very needy... Very needy of everything. Of basic needs of health, of education... of information. As I always say: 'No one is on the streets because they want. No one sleeps in the streets to see how is it like to spend the night in the streets. No one.' It's because they really need to.

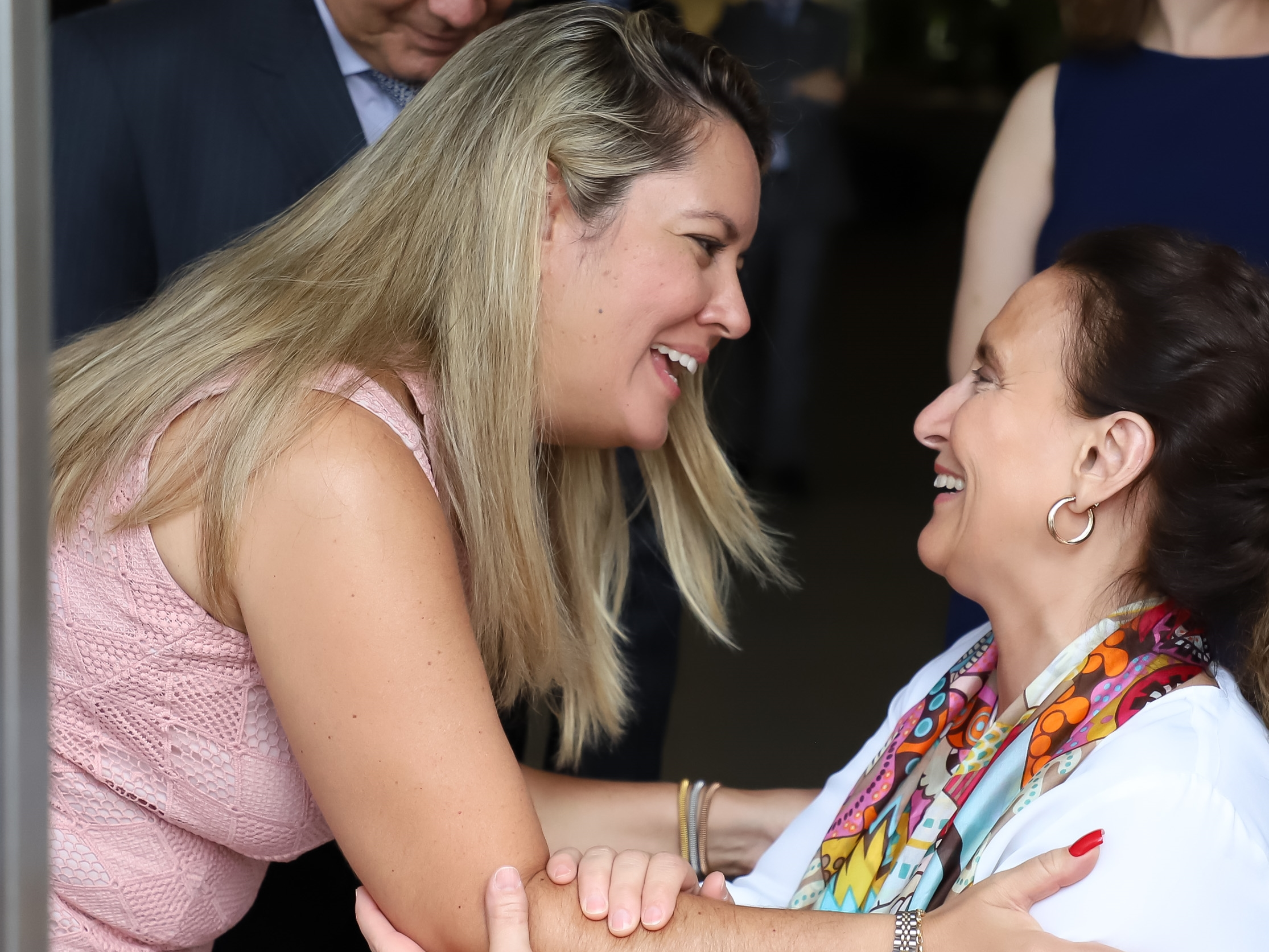
Paula and the Vice President of Argentina, Gabriela Michetti, in the Itamaraty Palace, on 12 April 2019.

Paula travelled to Bahia's capital, Salvador, where she visited the historical center, the Sesc and Senac units, the neighbourhood of Pelourinho, and the Sister Dulce Memorial. She also met the work made by the Artisanal Training Center (CFA), kept by the Sesc of the region.

On 5 November 2019, along with First Lady Michelle Bolsonaro, she was present in a charity tea organized by NGO Jardim das Borboletas, specialized in help people with epidermolysis bullosa. This rare disease is, according to the Ministry of Health, "a genetic and hereditary disease, which causes formation of blisters in the skin due to minor friction or trauma and it can manifests after birth.

Due to the 11th BRICS summit in Brasília, Paula attended a dinner with Vice President Mourão in one of the main halls of the Itamaraty Palace, in tribute to the Heads of State and their wives in the Brazilian capital, where they could appreciate the Citizen Child Orchestra. President Jair Bolsonaro, First Lady Michelle, Ministers and other members of Brazilian and foreign government and other authorities also attended the banquet.

On 30 November 2019, alongside Hamilton Mourão, Jair and Michelle Bolsonaro, the Second Lady attended a solemnity to deliver swords to 414 cadets who conclude the fourth grade of AMAN, the Military Academy of Agulhas Negras, in Resende, Rio de Janeiro. In the rank of Aspirant, others could receive the sword of official, which were delivered to 11 cadets from five countries: Two from Angola, one from Guyana, one from Honduras, five from Namibia and two from Paraguay.

=== Clean Hands, Healthy Life campaign ===
Second Lady Paula Mourão launched the "Clean Hands, Healthy Life" campaign in April 2020, along with the Brazilian Culture Institute, with the goal of gather donations of hand sanitizers, soaps and paper towels to be distributed in Brasília, destinated to needy families who are in social isolation due to the COVID-19 pandemic. Along with a voluntary team, Paula delivered 4,000 kits of personal hygiene to needy communities of Itapoã and Sol Nascente, who live in vulnerable situation. In Jabiru's Palace, the Second Lady formalized the deliver of the donations.

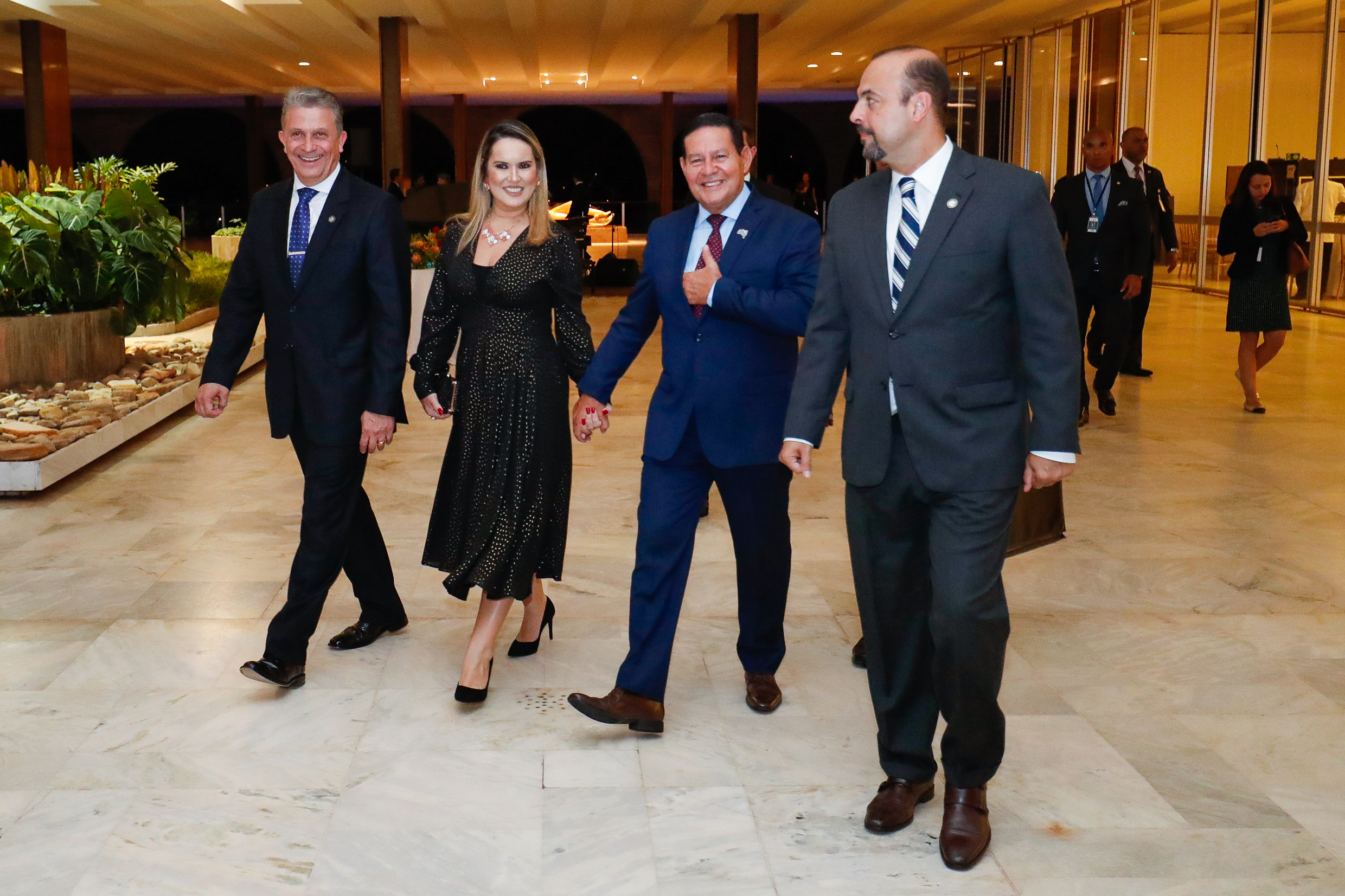
Paula and Hamilton Mourão in the Itamaraty Palace.

=== Official travel ===
==== Vatican ====
Paula was part of the official government team to the Vatican, in Rome, on 11 October 2019, to attend the canonization of Sister Dulce, the first Brazilian Saint. The Brazilian delegation also counted with the presence of Vice Presidente Mourão, the President of the Chamber of Deputies, Rodrigo Maia, the President of the Federal Senate, Davi Alcolumbre, and the President of the Supreme Federal Court, Dias Toffoli, besides former President José Sarney and othem members. On 12 October, Day of Our Lady of Aparecida, she attended a Solemn Celebration dedicated to the patroness of Brazil, and in the tribute opera to the Brazilian saint entitled "Ave Dulce", in the Brazilian Embassy in Italy. On the following day, she attended the canonization of Sister Dulce in St. Peter's Square, welcomed by Pope Francis along with her husband.

=== Style ===
Different from the presidential inauguration, the change in her appearance and way to dress was noticed and highly praised. The Second Lady has adopted a style considered classic, discreet and elegant, having chosen the Italian stylist Callíope Marcondes Ferraz to make her looks used in the everyday and in official ceremonies.

== Tributes ==
On 17 May 2019, she was honored by the Brazilian Culture Institute with the 2019 Highlight Woman Trophy and Celebrity Trophy.

== Controversies ==
Paula was once mistaken with a university professor of the Amazonas State University, Maria Paula Gomes Mourão. Owner of an extense curriculum, the teacher received many calls causing "countless disturbance and inconvenients". With the size of the repercussion, the university released an official note clarifying the mistake.

Honorary titles
| Vacant Title last held by Marcela Temer | Second Lady of Brazil; 2019–2023 | Succeeded by Lu Alckmin |
