= Alckmin =

Alckmin is a surname. Notable people with the surname include:

- Geraldo Alckmin (born 1952), Brazilian politician
- Maria Lúcia Ribeiro Alckmin (born 1951), wife of Geraldo Alckmin
