= Second Lady of Brazil =

Spouse of the vice president of Brazil

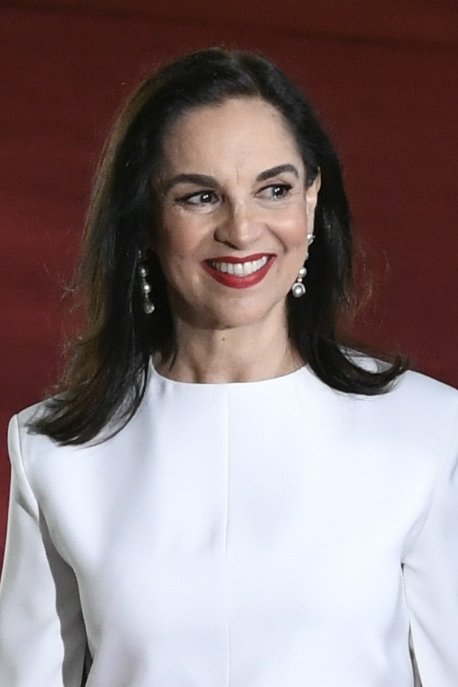
- Current; Lu Alckmin since 1 January 2023
- Style: Dona
- Residence: Palácio do Jaburu
- Inaugural holder: Josina Peixoto
- Formation: 26 February 1891 (135 years ago)

Second Lady of Brazil (Portuguese: Segunda-dama do Brasil) is a title given to the hostess of the Jaburu Palace. This title is less used when compared to the title of First Lady of Brazil.

The term second lady, made in contrast to first lady (who is almost all the time the spouse of the president), was used by Josina Peixoto (whose husband, Floriano Peixoto, was vice president in 1891) to refer to the spouse of the Vice President.

The visibility of the Second Lady in the public sphere has been a recent development besides the role of the First Lady as hostess of the Alvorada Palace (previously the Catete Palace and the Itamaraty Palace) dates from the beginning of the republic.

Ten Second Ladies became First Ladies of Brazil during her spouses tenures as president. The first was Josina Peixora, wife of Floriano Peixoto, who was the first Vice President in 1891 and the second President from 1891 to 1894. The last one was Marcela Temer, wife of Michel Temer, who had served as 24th Vice President from 2011 to 2016 and 37th President from 2016 to 2019. Mariquita Aleixo wasn't officially established as First Lady, as her husband was prevented from assuming office. Only Francisca Ribeiro was First Lady and later assumed the role of Second Lady.

The current Second Lady of Brazil is Lu Alckmin, wife of 26th Vice President of Brazil Geraldo Alckmin.

== History ==
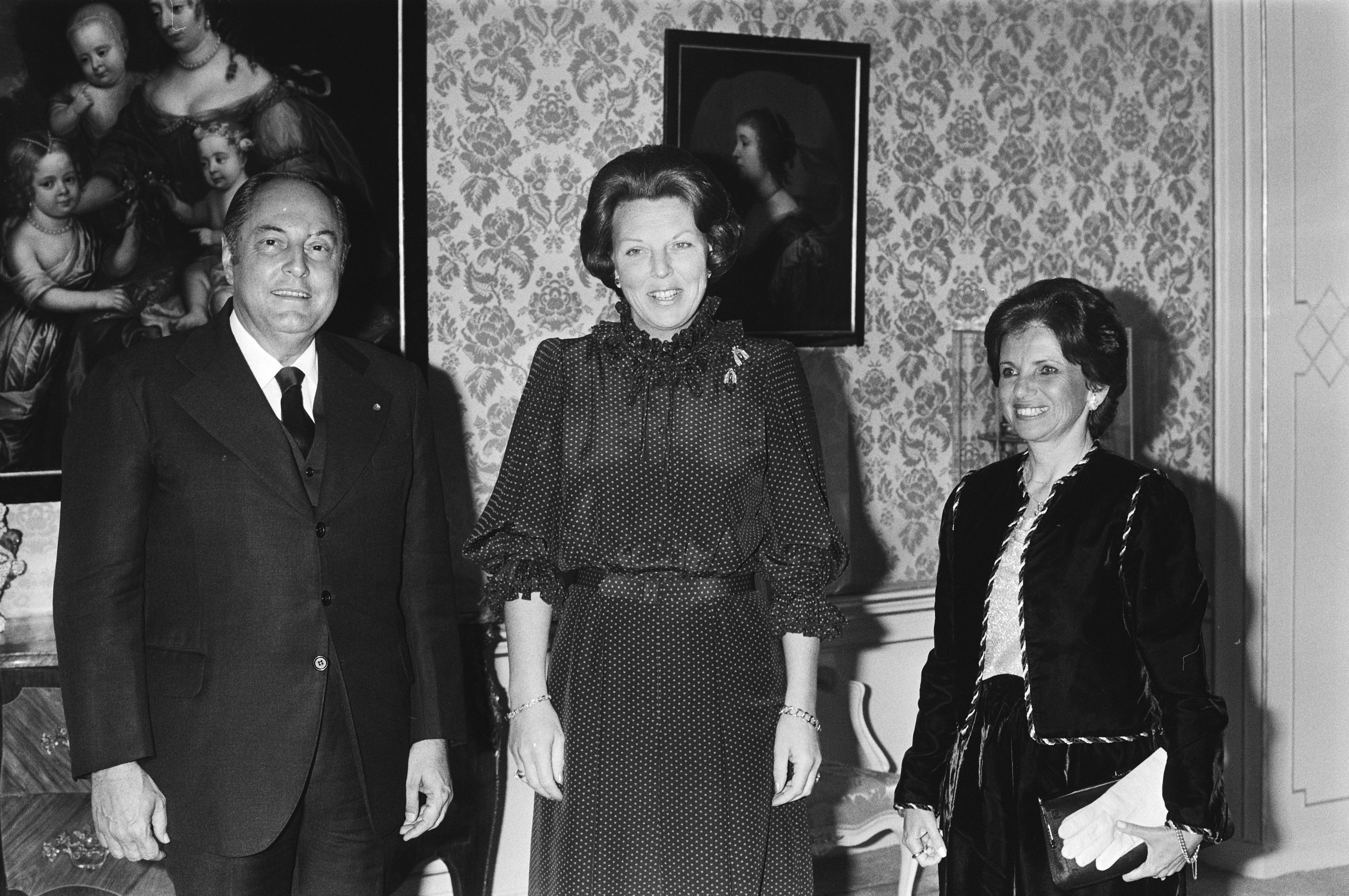
Vice President Aureliano Chaves with Queen Beatrix of the Netherlands (center) and Second Lady Vivi Chaves (right).

Even no country concedes any legal power to the Second Ladies, their roles frequently include hosting during reception in the vice presidential residence, to escort the Vice President in official trips and many ceremonial duties. Recently, the vice presidential spouses assume public roles which attracted significant attention from the media.

In 2011, Marcela Temer, wife of 24th Vice President Michel Temer, was involved with president Dilma Rousseff in the Prevention and Treatment of Cervical and Breast Cancer program, which was launched in Amazon Theatre.

Paula Mourão launched the Clean Hands, Healthy Life campaign in April 2020, along the Brazilian Culture Institute, with the objective of raise donaitions of soaps and alcohol gel to be distributed in Brasília, federal capital, with destination to poor people who are in social isolation due to the COVID-19 pandemic in Brazil. Followed by a voluntary team, Paula distributed 4,000 hygiene kits to families of poor communities of Itapoã and Sol Nascente, who live in vulnerable situation. In Jabiru's Palace, the Second Lady formalized the deliver of the donations to Itapoã administrator, to the Commander of the 2nd Western Regional Policing Command and to the Commander of the 2nd Military Police Battalion, who conducted the donations and distributed them to the needy.

There were 14 vacancies of the role, the longest one had been the 16 years landmark between Clotilde de Mello Vianna and Beatriz Ramos. This vacancy occurred due to the abolition of the office of Vice President of Brazil during the Vargas Era. The most recent period without a Second Lady was between Marcela Temer and Paula Mourão.

The youngest Second Lady in history was Maria Thereza Goulart, aged 19 when assumed the role. The oldest was Mariza Gomes, aged 67. Gomes' record will be surpassed on 1 January 2023, when Lu Alckmin will assume role at the age of 71.

== Gallery of vice presidential couples ==
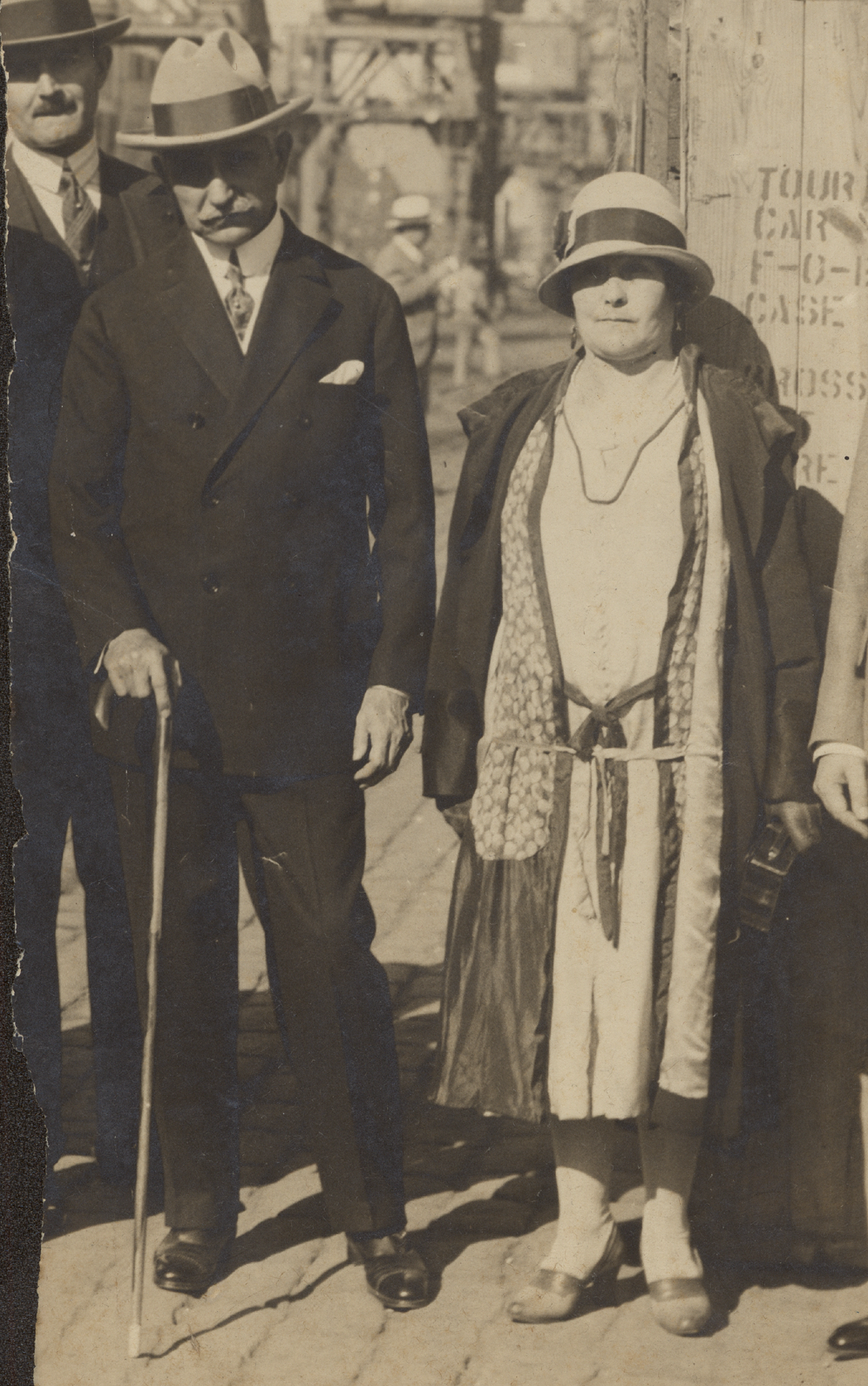
Vice President Estácio Coimbra and Second Lady Joanna Coimbra
1922–1926

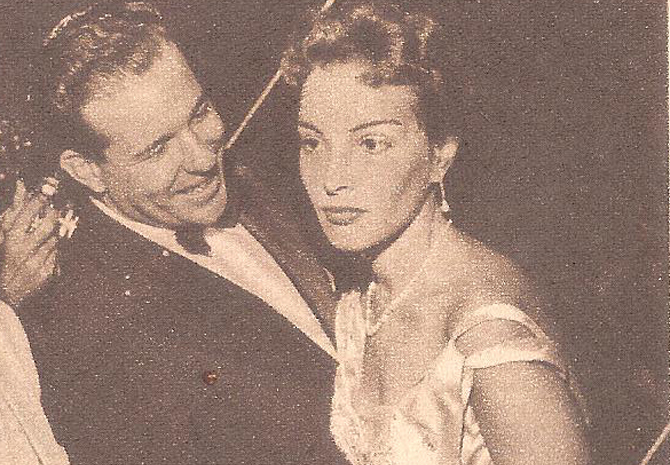
Vice President João Goulart and Second Lady Maria Thereza Goulart
1956–1961

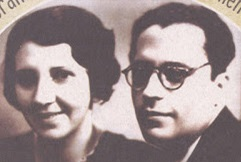
Vice President Pedro Aleixo and Second Lady Mariquita Aleixo
1967–1969

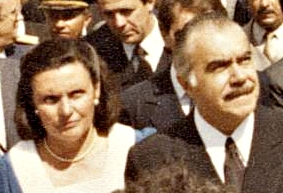
Vice President José Sarney and Second Lady Marly Sarney
1985

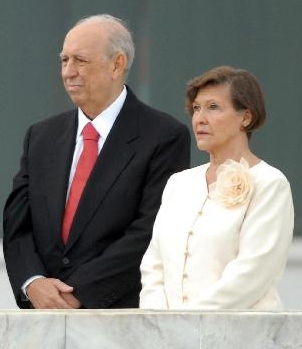
Vice President José Alencar and Second Lady Mariza Gomes
2003–2011

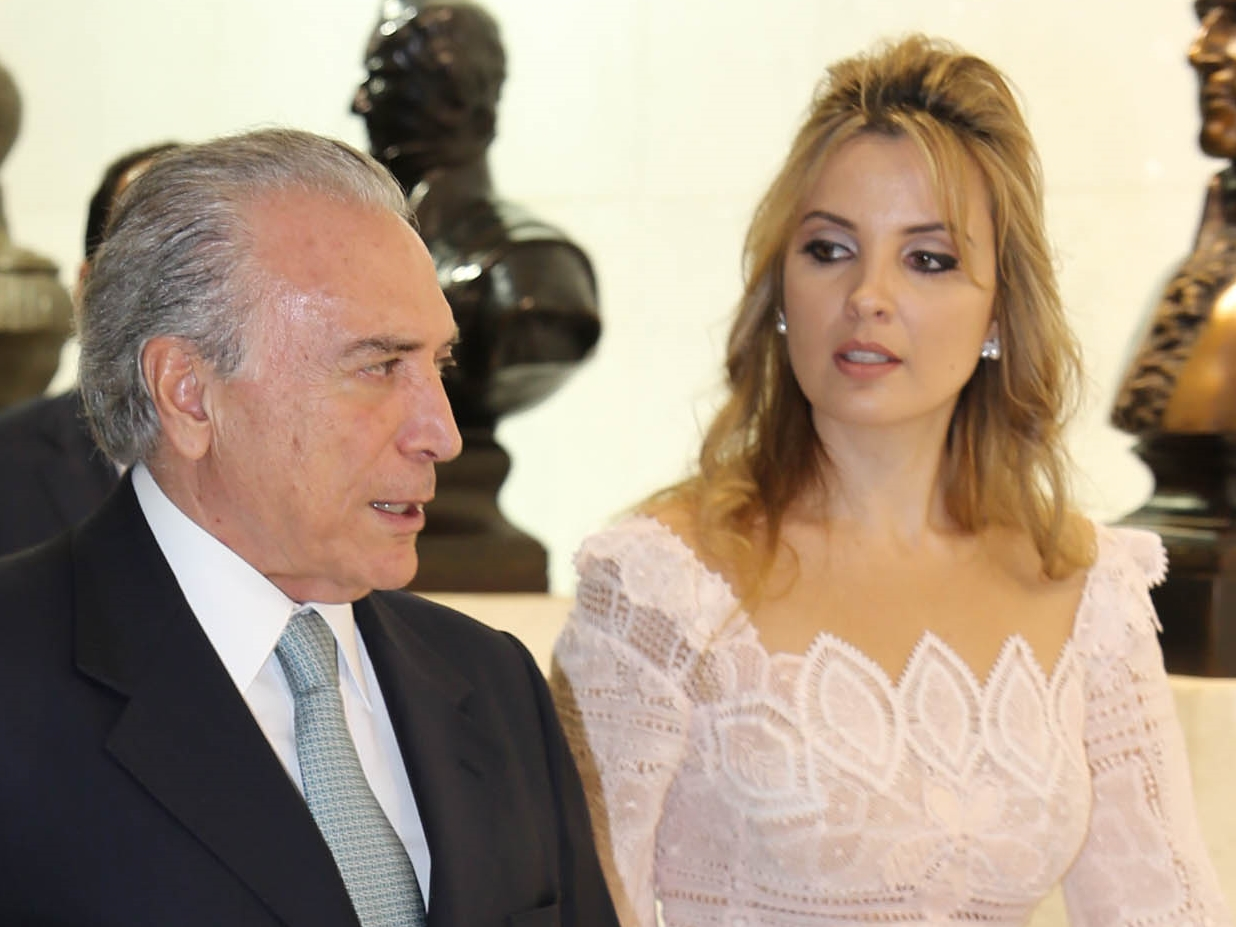
Vice President Michel Temer and Second Lady Marcela Temer
2011–2016

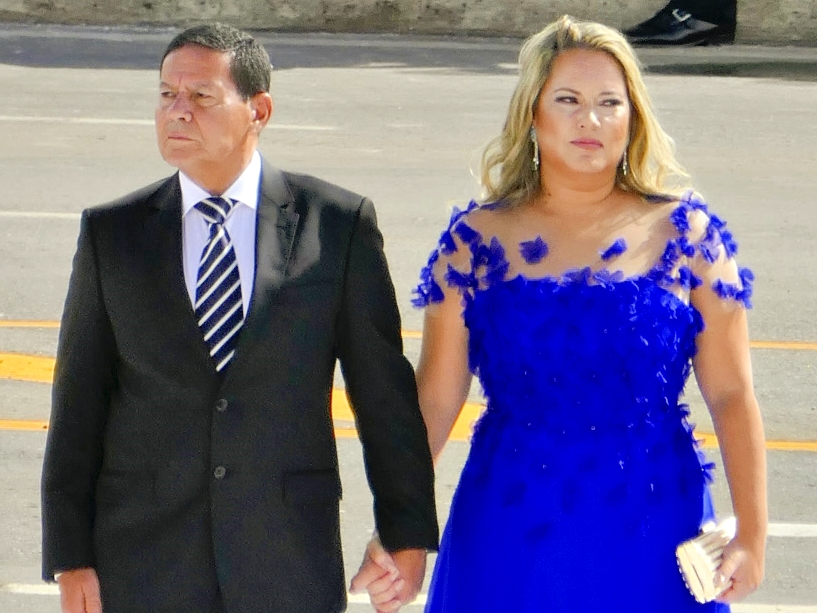
Vice President Hamilton Mourão and Second Lady Paula Mourão
2019–2022

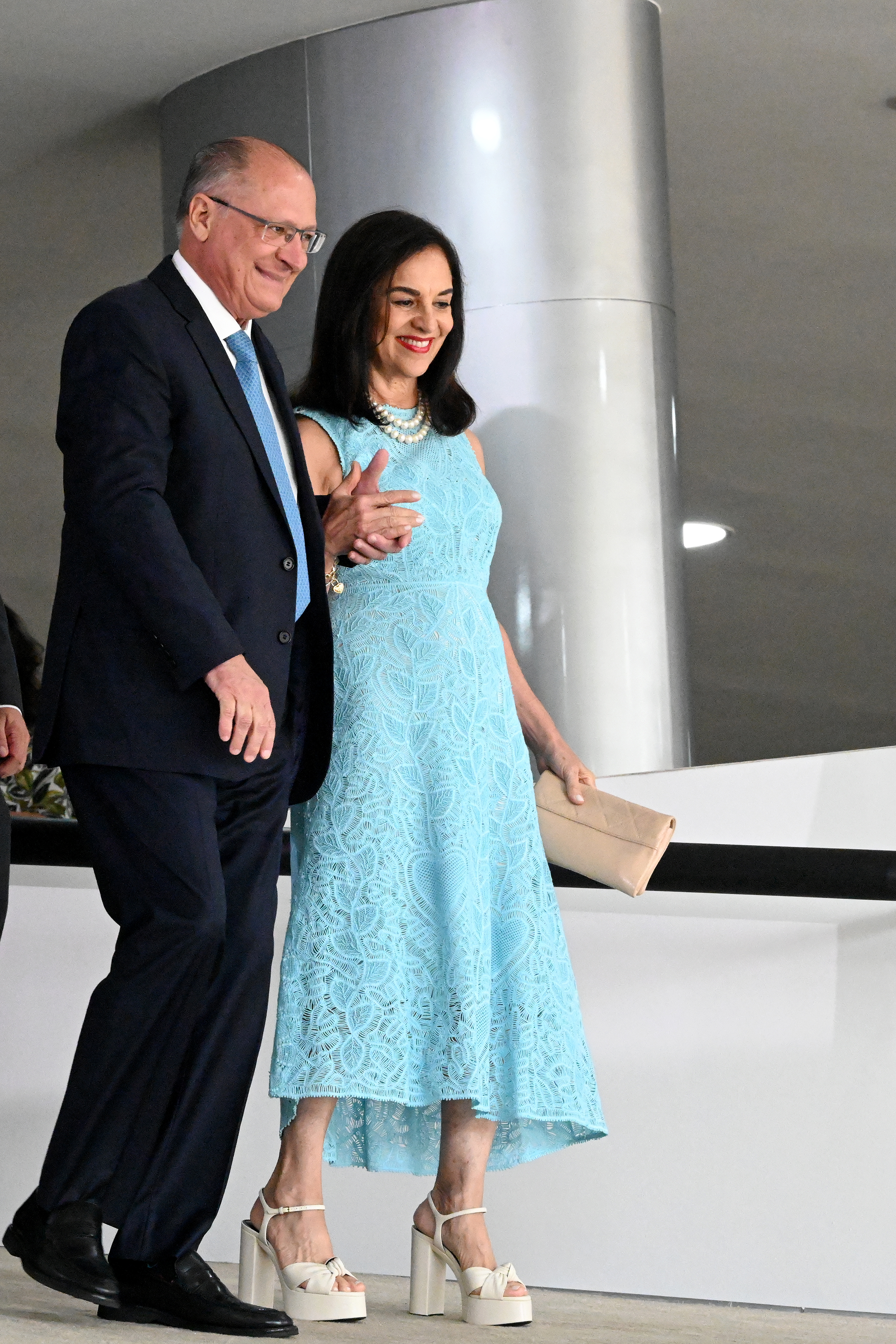
Vice President Geraldo Alckmin and Second Lady Lu Alckmin
2023–2023

== List of second ladies of Brazil ==
Image	Second Lady	Vice President Marriage date	Tenure	Date of birth	Date of death (age)	Tenure as First Lady
	Josina Peixoto	Floriano Peixoto; 11 May 1872	26 February 1891 – 23 November 1891	9 August 1857	5 November 1911 (54 years, 88 days)	1891–1894
Vacant; no vice president			23 November 1891 – 15 November 1894			
	Amélia Pereira	Manuel Vitorino; 1881	15 November 1894 – 15 November 1898	14 November 1863	Unknown date	
Vacant; Francisco Rosa e Silva was a widower			15 November 1898 – 15 November 1902			
	Esther Brandão	Silviano Brandão; 1889	– (Note: Esther Brandão didn't assume her role as Second Lady, as her husband died before inauguration.)	22 October 1868	25 July 1956 (87 years, 277 days)	
Vacant; no vice president			15 November 1902 – 17 June 1903			
	Guilhermina Pena	Afonso Pena; 23 January 1875	17 June 1903 – 15 November 1906	21 June 1857	14 July 1929 (72 years, 23 days)	1906–1909
	Anita Peçanha	Nilo Peçanha; 6 December 1895	15 November 1906 – 14 June 1909	21 March 1876	9 April 1960 (84 years, 19 days)	1909–1910
Vacant; no vice president			14 June 1909 – 15 November 1910			
	Maria Pereira Gomes	Venceslau Brás; 12 September 1892	15 November 1910 – 15 November 1914	19 August 1875	14 August 1925 (49 years, 360 days)	1914–1918
	Filomena Araújo	Urbano Santos; 6 February 1888	14 November 1914 – 15 November 1918	21 March 1868	3 August 1948 (80 years, 135 days)	
	Francisca Ribeiro	Delfim Moreira; 11 April 1891	15 November 1918 – 1 July 1920	9 October 1873	18 July 1965 (91 years, 282 days)	1918–1919 (Note: Due to the illness and consequent death of President-elect Rodrigues Alves, Vice President Delfim Moreira assumed office as President from 15 November 1918 to 28 July 1919.)
	Antonietta de Paiva	Bueno de Paiva; 12 February 1887	10 November 1920 – 15 November 1922	7 August 1873	4 July 1955 (−18 years, 34 days)	
	Joanna Coimbra	Estácio Coimbra; 1893	15 November 1922 – 15 November 1926	25 December 1873	18 October 1962 (88 years, 297 days)	
	Alfida Viana	Fernando de Melo Viana; June 1906	15 November 1926 – 14 January 1928	10 June 1876	14 January 1928 (51 years, 218 days)	
Vacant; Fernando de Melo Viana was a widower			14 January 1928 – 13 November 1928			
	Clotilde de Melo Viana	Fernando de Melo Viana; 13 November 1928	13 November 1928 – 24 October 1930	13 June 1903	17 April 1978 (74 years, 308 days)	
Vacant; no vice president			24 October 1930 – 19 September 1946			
	Beatriz Ramos	Nereu Ramos; 15 August 1916	19 September 1946 – 31 January 1951	9 October 1898	1 June 1991 (92 years, 235 days)	1955–1956
	Jandira Café	Café Filho; 17 September 1921	31 January 1951 – 24 August 1954	17 September 1903	28 February 1989 (85 years, 164 days)	1954–1955
Vacant; no vice president			24 August 1954 – 31 January 1956			
	Maria Thereza Goulart	João Goulart; 26 April 1955	31 January 1956 – 25 August 1961	23 August 1936	90 years, 15 days	1961–1964
Vacant; no vice president			25 August 1961 – 15 April 1964			
	Dasdores Alkmin	José Maria Alkmin; February 1930	15 April 1964 – 15 March 1967	4 September 1902	24 April 2000 (97 years, 233 days)	
	Mariquita Aleixo	Pedro Aleixo; 29 October 1925	15 March 1967 – 31 August 1969	7 November 1905	21 June 1989 (83 years, 226 days)	(Note: Due to the illness and death of president Costa e Silva, Pedro Aleixo was supposed to assume the office, but he was prevented by the 1969 military junta.)
Vacant; no vice president			31 August 1969 – 30 October 1969			
	Ruth Rademaker	Augusto Rademaker; 31 January 1940	30 October 1969 – 15 March 1974	26 March 1913	24 October 1995 (82 years, 212 days)	
Vacant; Adalberto Pereira dos Santos was a widower			15 March 1974 – 15 March 1979			
	Vivi Chaves	Aureliano Chaves; 3 May 1954	15 March 1979 – 15 March 1985	8 August 1929	11 October 2002 (73 years, 64 days)	
	Marly Sarney	José Sarney; 12 July 1952	15 March 1985 – 21 April 1985	4 December 1932	93 years, 277 days	1985–1990
Vacant; no vice president			21 April 1985 – 15 March 1990			
Vacant; Itamar Franco was divorced			15 March 1990 – 29 December 1992			
Vacant; no vice president			29 December 1992 – 1 January 1995			
	Anna Maria Maciel	Marco Maciel; 28 December 1967	1 January 1995 – 1 January 2003	20 March 1941	85 years, 171 days	
	Mariza Gomes	José Alencar; 9 November 1957	1 January 2003 – 1 January 2011	19 March 1935	91 years, 182 days	
	Marcela Temer	Michel Temer; 26 July 2003	1 January 2011 – 31 August 2016	16 May 1983	43 years, 114 days	2016–2018
Vacant; no vice president			31 August 2016 – 1 January 2019			
	Paula Mourão	Hamilton Mourão; 11 October 2018	1 January 2019 – 1 January 2023	2 May 1976	50 years, 128 days	
	Lu Alckmin	Geraldo Alckmin; 16 March 1979	1 January 2023 – present	28 December 1951	74 years, 253 days	

== Other spouses of Brazilian vice presidents ==
Various other spouses of vice presidents of Brazil are not considered as second ladies of Brazil because their marriages were not during the vice presidential terms of their husbands.

Two Brazilian vice presidents were widowed prior to their vice presidencies:

- Francisco Rosa e Silva was married to Maria das Dores Rosa e Silva from 1883 until her death in 1892.
- Adalberto Pereira dos Santos was married to Julieta Pereira dos Santos from 1941 until her death in 1968.

Two Brazilian vice presidents were widowed and remarried prior to their vice presidencies:

- Fernando de Melo Viana was married to Maria José de Melo Viana. He was subsequently married to Alfrida Viana from 1906 until her death in 1928.
- Hamilton Mourão was married to Elisabeth Mourão from 1976 until her death in 2016. He has subsequently been married to Paula de Oliveira since 2018.

One Brazilian vice president was divorced prior to his vice presidency:

- Itamar Franco was married to Ana Elisa Surerus from 1968 until 1978.

One Brazilian vice president was divorced and remarried prior to his vice presidency:

- Michel Temer was married to Maria Célia de Toledo from 1969 until 1987. He has subsequently been married to Marcela Tedeschi since 2003.

One Brazilian vice president remarried after his vice presidency:

- Francisco Rosa e Silva was married to Heloísa Rosa e Silva from 1911 until 1929.

== See also ==
- First Lady of Brazil
- Vice President of Brazil
