= Second lady or gentleman =

Spouse of a vice president or a lieutenant governor

Second lady and second gentleman are honorary titles often used in reference to the spouse of a vice president, or spouse of a lieutenant governor or other second-ranked government official. The title is styled after first lady or first gentleman, which are used to describe the spouse of a president or governor. In discussing both spouses, they may be referred to as the second couple, and if they have children, they are known collectively as the second family.

The expression "second lady in the land" has also been used to refer to the second-highest ranking female in a monarchy, such as a crown princess if there is a queen.

== Ghana ==
In Ghana, an emoluments committee set up in June 2019 recommended that the spouse of the vice president should receive compensation equivalent to the salary of a cabinet minister-MP, along with the spouse of the president. Although the recommendation was approved by Parliament in 2021, both the first lady and Second Lady Samira Bawumia rejected the proposed payments and promised to refund the allowances they had been paid since 2017, following public backlash against the emoluments. In opposing their monthly salaries, the Trades Union Congress acknowledged the role of the first and second ladies, particularly in supporting women's rights, children's rights, and other causes promoting social and economic development, but stressed that they were not assigned official duties according to the Constitution of Ghana or other national laws.

== United States ==
=== Spouse of the vice president ===
The role of the second lady is unpaid and not formally defined. The wife of the vice president of the United States was traditionally expected to serve as a hostess and appear at society functions. As the Office of the Vice President itself gained power and influence, the spouse of the vice president also became more visible. Second Lady Lady Bird Johnson often replaced First Lady Jacqueline Kennedy when she withdrew from public appearances. Pat Nixon, wife of Vice President Richard Nixon, was the first second spouse to add a great deal of substance to the role, traveling independently of the vice president and setting her own event schedule. Historian Kate Andersen Brower wrote, "she helped to define this nebulous role for an entire generation of women who would succeed her." Subsequent second ladies also had their own issues which they advocated, such as education reform and literacy.

==== Usage of title ====
Writers including William Safire and Jeff McQuain have suggested that use of the term "second lady" to refer to the wife of the vice president of the United States did not become more commonplace until the 1980s. However, in 2017, Washington Post columnist Philip Bump argued that use of the phrase "second lady" could be traced back as early as the 1860s, strengthening in popularity around 1892, and "spiking" around the turn of the 20th century, according to his research using the Google Ngram tool.

In 1996, Tipper Gore wrote that the spouse of the vice president did not have an official title, and that people were often unsure about how to introduce her, saying: "Sometimes they call me the Second Lady. Sometimes they refer to me as the Second First Lady. Once I was even introduced as the Second Lady of Vice." In 2008, when a Fox News host remarked that calling Lynne Cheney the Second Lady of the United States was "weird", Cheney acknowledged, "Well, it is, a little, but it's ok." The abbreviation for the Second Lady of the United States is SLOTUS.

==== Second gentleman ====
In 2021, Merriam-Webster added the term "second gentleman" to its dictionary, in light of Doug Emhoff becoming the first male spouse of an American vice president. Emhoff, who followed Biden's example and started teaching entertainment law at Georgetown University at the same time he assumed his ceremonial role as Second Gentleman of the United States, has acknowledged the many generations of women who had served in the role "without much accolade", and vowed to continue building on "their legacy of progress". The abbreviation for Second Gentleman of the United States is SGOTUS.

=== Spouse of the lieutenant governor ===
At the state level, second lady or second gentleman is used to refer to the spouse of the lieutenant governor. In political fiction, novelist and journalist Jim Lehrer referred to Jackie, wife of fictional Lieutenant Governor "One-Eyed Mack", as the Second Lady of Oklahoma from the late 1980s.

In 2020, Second Lady Giselle Fetterman told CNN that she prefers the titular acronym SLOP over the more "stuffy" title of Second Lady of Pennsylvania. Andrew Rosati of Bloomberg News said in 2022 that Fetterman, a former undocumented immigrant to the U.S. from Brazil, has "transformed the ceremonial role of Second Lady of Pennsylvania...into a megaphone for the marginalized".

== Other countries ==
=== Spouse of the vice president ===
In Brazil, the second lady (Segunda-dama do Brasil), is the wife of the vice president and resides with him at Jaburu's Palace.

The role of the second lady or second gentlemen in Colombia is relatively recent. Traditionally, the wife of the Colombian vice president was expected to host and appear at social events. However, in practice, many have preferred to be semi public or sometimes private figures, fulfilling the role in a very limited way. Over the years, the role has gained more prominence in the media, but it remains considerably smaller compared to the role of the first lady.

In Nigeria, former Second Lady Titi Abubakar, the wife of Vice President Atiku Abubakar (1999–2007), used her role to combat human trafficking. During her tenure, she founded WOTCLEF (Women Trafficking and Child Labour Eradication Foundation), and became the first civilian in Nigerian history to propose draft legislation.

=== Other uses ===
In the United Kingdom, Camilla Parker Bowles was said to become the "second lady in the land", ranking second only to Queen Elizabeth II, upon marrying Charles, Prince of Wales, in 2005. In 1958, The Times noted that the duties of an American second lady at home in Washington, D.C., "have no exact counterpart in England".

In France, Penelope Fillon, the British-born wife of former Prime Minister François Fillon, was nicknamed "France's second lady" in the media. However, France Magazine reported in 2008 that Fillon was trying to play down the role, which had traditionally remained outside the limelight.

== See also ==
- First lady
- Second Lady of Brazil
- Second Lady or Second Gentleman of Colombia
- Second Lady of Ghana
- Second ladies and gentlemen of Indonesia
- Second Lady or Second Gentleman of the United States
