= Maria Thereza Goulart =

First Lady of Brazil from 1961 to 1964

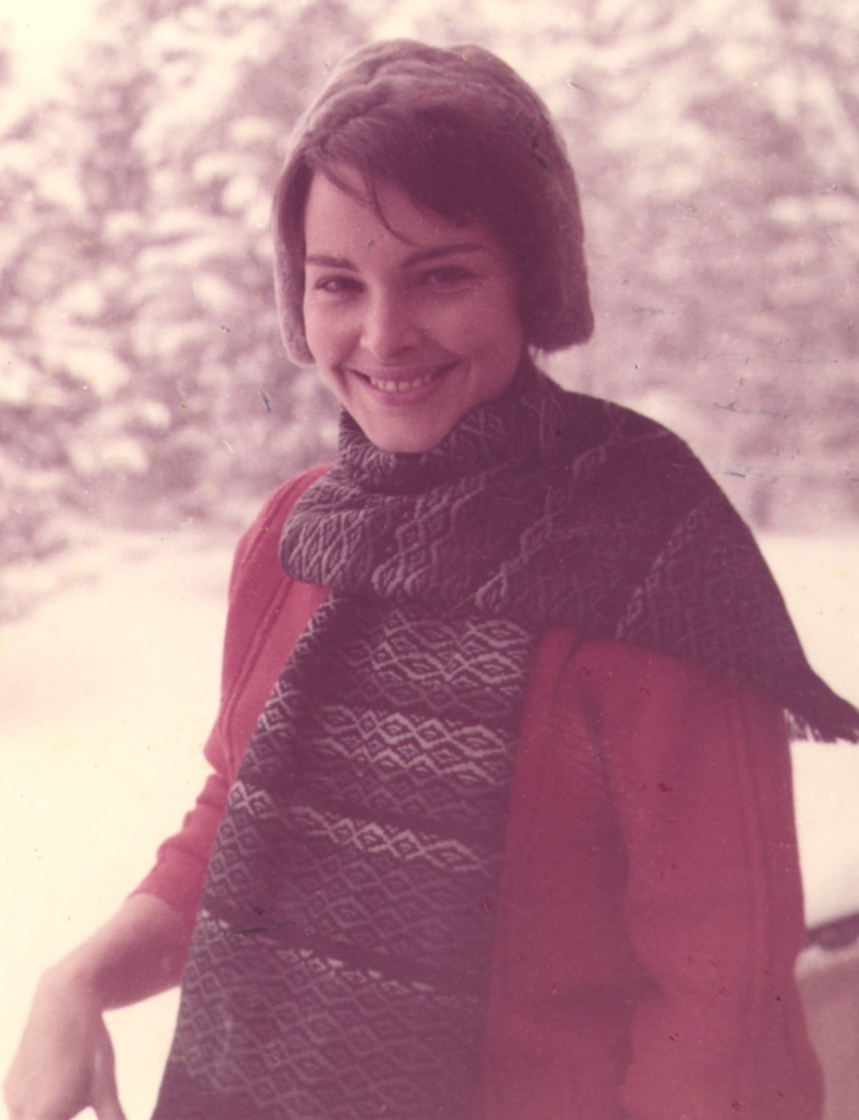
- Maria Thereza Goulart in 1963

First Lady of Brazil
- In role September 7, 1961 – April 1, 1964
- President: João Goulart
- Preceded by: Sylvia Pitaguary
- Succeeded by: Sylvia Pitaguary

Second Lady of Brazil
- In role January 31, 1956 – August 25, 1961
- Vice President: João Goulart
- Preceded by: Jandira Carvalho
- Succeeded by: Dasdores Fonseca

Personal details
- Born: Maria Thereza Fontella; August 23, 1936 (age 90) São Borja, Rio Grande do Sul, Brazil
- Spouse: João Goulart (m. 1955; died 1976)
- Children: João Vicente Goulart (born 1956); Denise Goulart (born 1957)

Maria Thereza Fontella Goulart (born August 23, 1936) is the widow of the 24th president of Brazil, João Goulart, and served as First Lady during his presidency from 1961 until 1964, when he was deposed by a military-led coup d'état.

== Biography ==
=== Early life ===
Born in the interior of the state of Rio Grande do Sul, Goulart was the daughter of Italian immigrants Dinarte Fontella and Maria Júlia Pasqualotto, who gave birth alone on an isolated road when she was 15 years old. With her mother she learned Italian and with her maternal uncle she learned to ride and shoot - already mastering target shooting at age 8.

At the age of five, Goulart moved in with her aunt Horaides Zambone in São Borja, to recover from anemia. Still at the age of five she was enrolled in the Getúlio Vargas School Group, but was expelled. She was then enrolled in an extremely strict school run by nuns, where she stayed for two years, until she was expelled.

Maria Tereza studied at the American Methodist College, a boarding school in Porto Alegre, where she stayed under the care of a cousin, where in school, his life was under strict rules. In the city of São Borja, she lived next door to João Goulart's house, whom she met personally at the age of fourteen. According to Maria Thereza herself, she was in charge of bringing correspondence to him at the request of Dinarte Dornelles (Getúlio Vargas' maternal uncle).

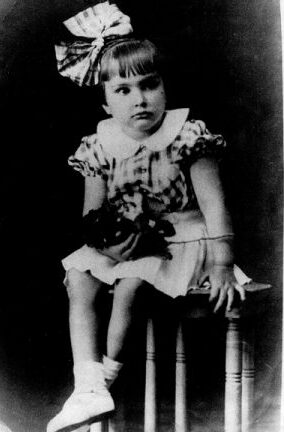
Maria Thereza in childhood

In Porto Alegre, at the house of her aunt América Fontella who was married to Spartacus Dornelles Vargas (Getúlio's brother), Maria Tereza met Leonel Brizola at the age of 12. She met João Goulart when at 13 years old and he, 31. Maria Thereza held her debutante ball, and Goulart was among the guests. As she said, she did not fall in love with her future husband at "first sight", because she didn't imagine that "she could date a person of her projection". Among Maria Thereza's cousins was the politician Yara Vargas, who later helped found the Democratic Labor Party (PDT).

=== Marriage and children ===
In 1955, when Maria Thereza finished her studies, she and Jango Goulart started dating. They got married in the following year when Maria Thereza was 19 and Jango was running for the vice presidency. At that time, there were separate elections for president and vice president in Brazil, and Jango would receive more votes than Juscelino Kubitschek, who was elected president. After her marriage, Maria Thereza became the sister-in-law of Leonel Brizola, who was married to Jango's sister Neusa.

In 1960, Jango was re-elected vice president, which allowed Maria Thereza to serve as Second Lady from 1956 to 1961, when Jânio Quadros resigned from the presidency. When her husband assumed office, Maria Thereza became the youngest First Lady in the history of Brazil, at just 25 years of age.

Maria Thereza and Jango had two children: the former congressman João Vicente and the historian Deize. When she served as Second Lady, her family lived in the Chopin Building, next to the Copacabana Palace in Rio de Janeiro. During the time she served as First Lady, she lived in the Granja do Torto in the then recently built capital Brasília. She lived in Palácio da Alvorada, the official residence, for six months, but preferred the Granja do Torto because she liked horse racing.

=== Life as First Lady ===
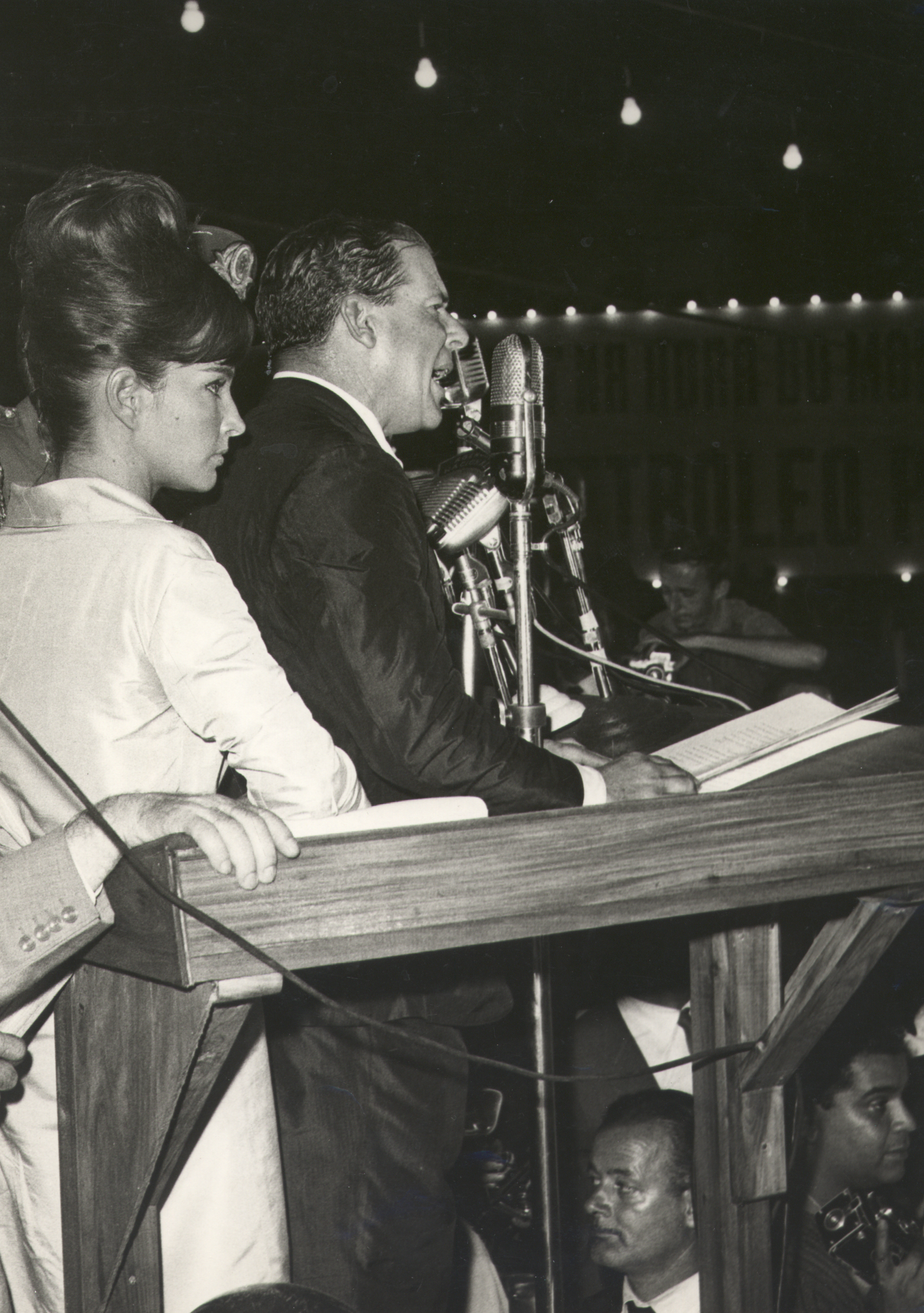
Maria Thereza accompanying her husband during the Comício da Central on 13 March 1964

In August 1961, Maria Thereza and her children were guests in a Spanish hotel owned by a friend of the Goulart family, while her husband was on a diplomatic mission in the People's Republic of China. One day, at breakfast, she was told that Jânio Quadros had resigned and that her husband would become the new president. Shortly after, journalists started incessantly calling her room.

Quadros advised her to stay at the hotel until the situation with the military ministers, who refused to recognize Jango as the new president because of his connections with members of the Brazilian Communist Party and the Brazilian Socialist Party, was solved. Maria Thereza only returned to Brazil when her husband assumed the presidency.

As First Lady, Maria Thereza was responsible for the foundation of the headquarters of the Legião Brasileira de Assistência (Brazilian Legion of Aid) -- an organization founded in 1942 by then First Lady Darcy Vargas to help poor families—in Brasília. She hosted a large number of charitable events, being responsible for bringing members of the high society to participate in such events.

Maria Thereza chose to wear haute couture outfits to public events, and became a fashion icon, being compared to Jacqueline Kennedy and appearing on the covers of a large number of magazines. Her personal stylist was Dener Pamplona de Abreu.

=== Life in exile ===
After the deposition of Jango on April 1, 1964, by the military, the Goulart family was forced to live in exile. Jango, Maria Thereza and their children lived in Uruguay. Later, Denise and João Vicente moved to London, while Jango and Maria Thereza went to Argentina, where Jango had business affairs. Jango died in the city of Mercedes on the night of December 6, 1976. The official version of his death is that he suffered a heart attack. This is uncertain as his body was not submitted for an autopsy and the attending physician wrote only the Spanish word enfermedad (sickness) as the causa mortis on his medical chart. He was buried in his native São Borja. Thirty thousand people attended his funeral, media coverage of which was censored by the military regime. Maria Thereza and her children were forbidden to return to Brazil until 1979's amnesty law.

== Amnesty ==
On November 15, 2008, Maria Thereza and Jango received political amnesty from the Federal Government. The former First Lady would receive an indemnification of R$ 644,000 (around US$ 322,000) to be paid in pensions of R$5,425 (around US$2,712) per month, in compensation for Jango being prohibited from practicing his job as a lawyer. She also received an indemnification of R$100,000 (around US$50,000) for the 15 years when her family was forbidden to return to Brazil.

The government recognizes its mistakes of the past and apologizes to a man that defended the nation and its people of whom we could not have prescinded

— President Luiz Inácio Lula da Silva

== In popular culture ==
Director Susanna Lira was set to make the film Vestida de Silêncio, which production was scheduled to begin in 2021, examining the life story of João Goulart through the eyes of Maria Thereza.

Honorary titles
Preceded by Jandira Carvalho	Second Lady of Brazil; 1956–1961	Succeeded by Dasdores Fonseca
Preceded by Sylvia Pitaguary	First Lady of Brazil; 1961–1964	Succeeded by Sylvia Pitaguary
