= Manuel Antônio Ribeiro de Castro, Baron of Santa Rita =

Portuguese politician and merchant (1767–1854)

Baron of Santa Rita
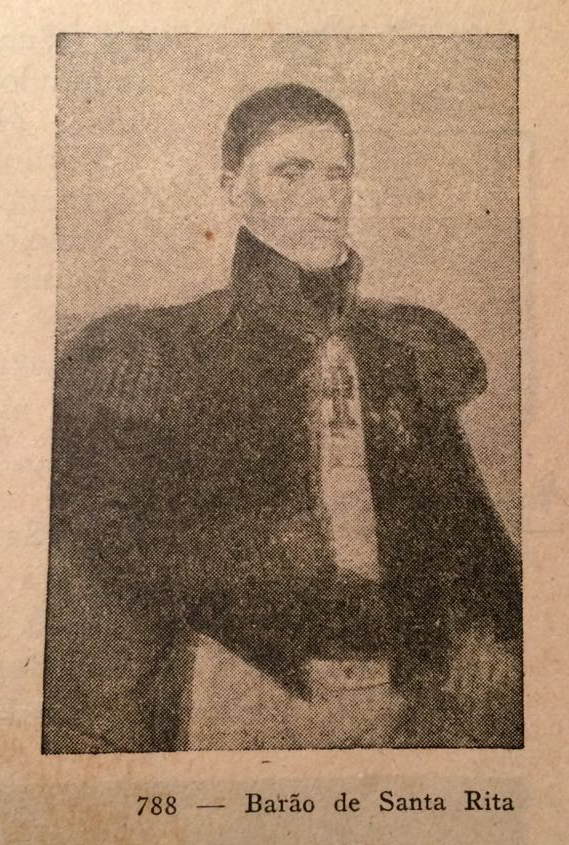
- Born: Manuel Antônio Ribeiro de Castro; 8 November 1767; São Miguel das Caldas de Vizela, Kingdom of Portugal
- Died: 26 May 1854 (aged 86); Campos dos Goytacazes, Province of Rio de Janeiro, Empire of Brazil
- Spouse: Ana Francisca Batista de Almeida Pinheiro
- Occupation: Landowner; politician

Manuel Antônio Ribeiro de Castro, 1st Baron of Santa Rita (8 November 1767 — 26 May 1854) was a Portuguese-born Brazilian merchant, plantation owner and politician.

== Biography ==
Castro was born in São Miguel de Caldas, then archbishopric of Braga, parish of the municipality of Guimarães, currently parish of the municipality of Vizela, Portugal.

In 1789 he was a merchant registered at the Royal Board of Trade of Lisbon. He emigrated to Brazil and settled in Vila de São Salvador de Campos (present-day Campos dos Goytacazes). As the region was experiencing a great development in sugar production, he became a prominent farmer.

Castro was the last captain-major of the former Vila de São Salvador de Campos dos Goytacazes.

He was a knight of the Imperial Order of Christ and an officer of the Order of the Rose.

He received the title of Baron of Santa Rita, referring to the parish of Santa Rita da Lagoa de Cima, currently the district of Ibitioca in Campos dos Goytacazes, where his Fazenda do Queimado was located. Greatness was granted by decree of 11 October 1848, although there was no rectification in the "Holders of the Empire".

He died on his farm of Queimado, parish of Santa Rita da Lagoa de Cima, in the municipality of Campos dos Goytacazes.

== Genealogy ==
Castro married on 24 May 1797 the camper D. Anna Francisca Baptista de Almeida Pinheiro, known as "The Fortune", a large landowner, widow of Captain Jerônimo Álvares Pereira, mother of Commander João de Almeida Pereira and grandmother of counselor João de Almeida Pereira Filho. The couple had the following children:

- Rachel Francisca Ribeiro de Castro, who married Manuel Pinto Neto da Cruz, the baron of Muriaé, and, already a widow, received the title of Viscountess of Muriaé;
- Francisca Antonia Ribeiro de Castro, who married José Carneiro da Silva, first baron and first grandiose viscount of Araruama;
- Commander Joaquim Ribeiro de Castro, who married his niece Anna Seraphina de Castro Carneiro da Silva, daughter of the first viscount of Araruama;
- Commander Jerônimo Ribeiro de Castro, who married his niece (through her mother's first marriage) Úrsula Carolina de Almeida Pereira, sister of the counselor João de Almeida Pereira Filho;
- Commander Francisco Ribeiro de Castro, who married Ana Teresa Diniz e Souza;
- Commander Antônio Ribeiro de Castro, who married his niece Ana Joaquina de Castro Netto, daughter of the Baron and Viscountess of Muriaé;
- Commander Julião Ribeiro de Castro, who married his niece Maria Isabel de Castro Carneiro da Silva, daughter of the first viscount of Araruama;
- Commander José Ribeiro de Castro, 2nd Baron and 1st Viscount of Santa Rita, who married his niece Maria Antonia de Castro Netto, daughter of the Baron and Viscountess of Muriaé;
- Ana Francisca Ribeiro de Castro, married to Doctor Francisco Baptista de Souza Cabral;
- Commander Manoel Antonio Ribeiro de Castro, married to Maria Ignácia do Souto-Maior.

== Bibliography ==
- Nobreza Brasileira de A a Z - Seção S-1
- QUEIRÓS MATOSO, Gilberto de. A Família Araruama. In. Edição Commemorativa do Cinqüentenário do Instituto Genealógico Brasileiro (1939–1989). São Paulo: Instituto Genealógico Brasileiro, 1991, pp. 321–29.
- LAMEGO, Alberto. A Terra Goytacá: Á luz de documentos inéditos. Niterói, RJ: Diário Oficial, Tomo Sexto, 1943.
