= Lu Alckmin =

Second Lady of Brazil since 2023

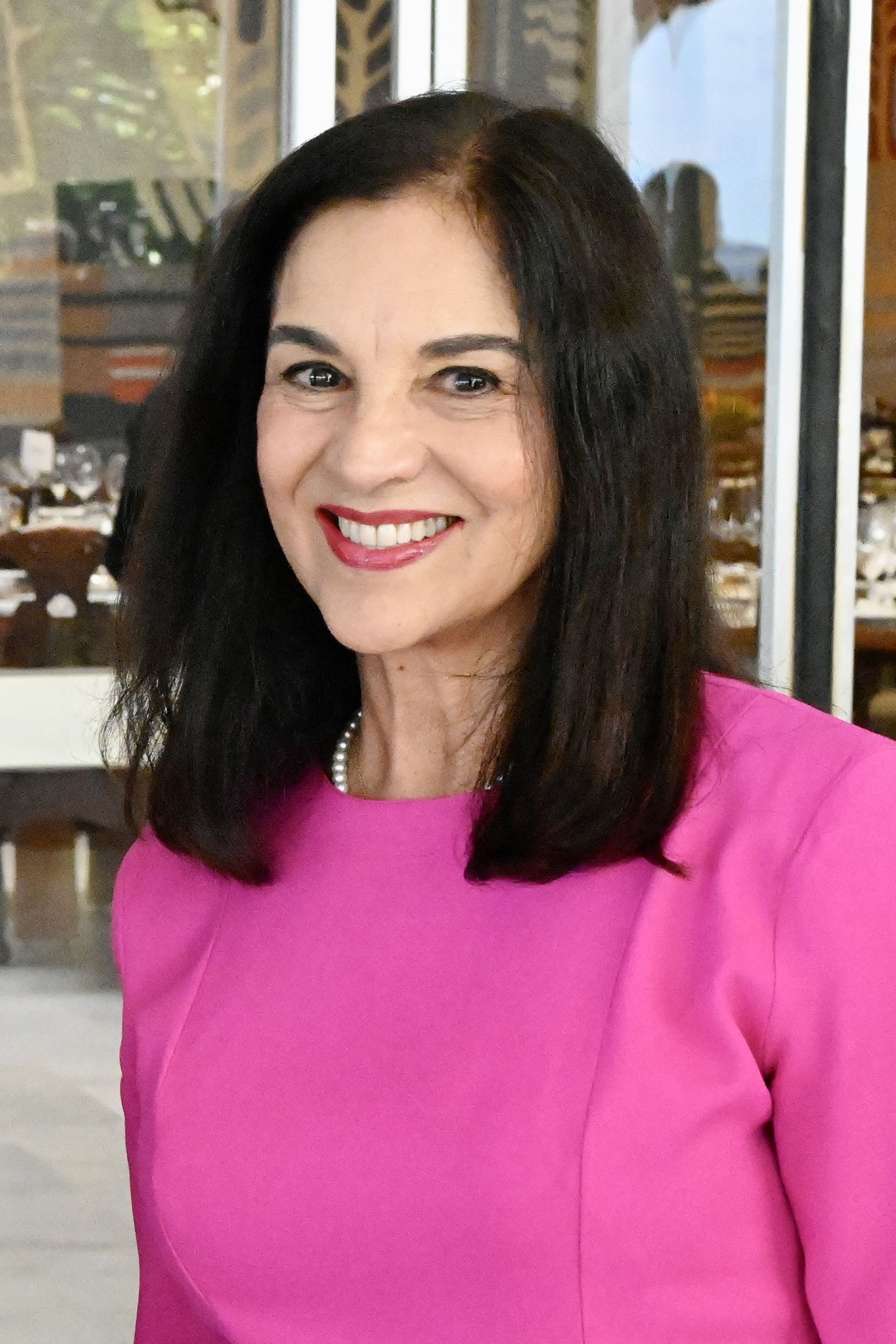
- Alckmin in 2023

Second Lady of Brazil
- Current
- Assumed role 1 January 2023
- Vice President: Geraldo Alckmin
- Preceded by: Paula Mourão

First Lady of São Paulo
- In role 1 January 2011 – 6 April 2018
- Governor: Geraldo Alckmin
- Preceded by: Deuzeni Goldman
- Succeeded by: Lúcia França
- In role 6 March 2001 – 30 March 2006
- Governor: Geraldo Alckmin
- Preceded by: Lila Covas
- Succeeded by: Renéa Lembo

Second Lady of São Paulo
- In role 1 January 1995 – 6 March 2001
- Lieutenant Governor: Geraldo Alckmin
- Preceded by: Gisele Nunes
- Succeeded by: Renéa Lembo (2003)

First Lady of Pindamonhangaba
- In role 16 March 1979 – 15 May 1982
- Mayor: Geraldo Alckmin
- Preceded by: Isabel do Carmo Nogueira
- Succeeded by: Cecília Forte Lobo

Personal details
- Born: Maria Lúcia Guimarães Ribeiro; 28 December 1951 (age 74) São Paulo, São Paulo, Brazil
- Spouse: Geraldo Alckmin (m. 1979)
- Children: 3
- Education: University of Taubaté (BM)

Maria Lúcia "Lu" Guimarães Ribeiro Alckmin (née Guimarães Ribeiro; born 28 December 1951) is a Brazilian professor who has served as second lady of Brazil since 2023 as the wife of Geraldo Alckmin, the 41st vice president of Brazil.

Alckmin has also served as second lady of São Paulo, first lady of São Paulo, and President of the São Paulo Social Fund. She is the second person to serve as First Lady of São Paulo on two non-consecutive occasions, after Leonor Barros.

Born in São Paulo, São Paulo, Alckmin has distinguished herself for her political leadership. She has been known as a champion of her husband's political causes.

Honorary titles
Preceded by Gisele Nunes	Second Lady of São Paulo; 1995–2001	Vacant Title next held by Renéa Lembo
Preceded by Lila Covas	First Lady of São Paulo; 2001–2006	Succeeded by Renéa Lembo
Preceded by Deuzeni Goldman	First Lady of São Paulo; 2011–2018	Succeeded by Lúcia França
Preceded by Paula Mourão	Second Lady of Brazil; 2023–present	Current holder
