= Jaburu Palace =

Official residence of the vice president of Brazil

- Palácio do Jaburu
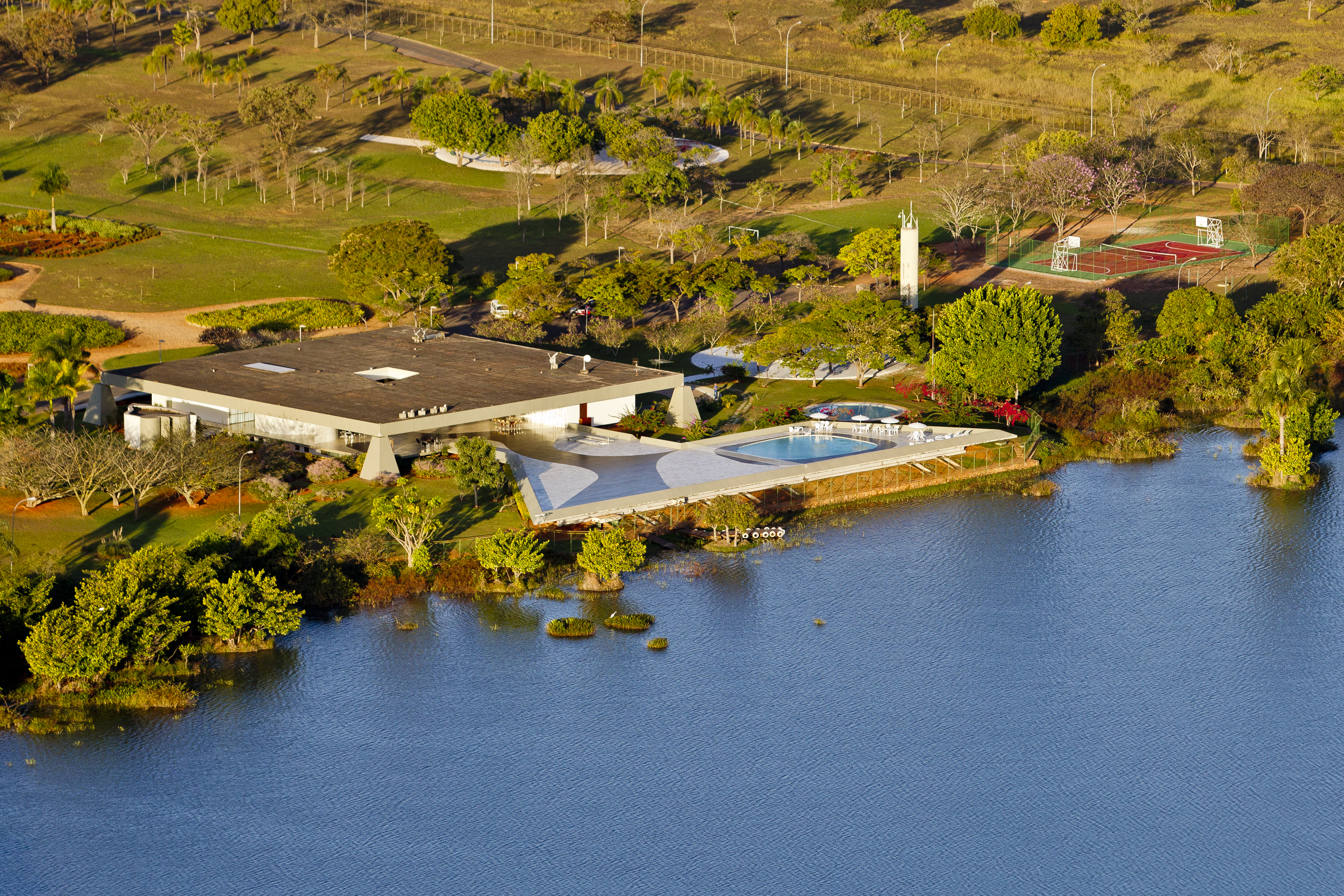
- Aerial view of the vice presidential residence

General information
- Architectural style: Modernist
- Location: Brasília, Federal District, Via Presidencial, Zona Cívico-Administrativa – CEP 70150-000, Brazil
- Coordinates: 15°47′58.83″S 47°51′51.22″W
- Current tenants: Geraldo Alckmin, Vice President of Brazil
- Construction started: 1973
- Owner: Federal government of Brazil

Design and construction
- Architect: Oscar Niemeyer

Website
- gov.br/planalto

The Jaburu Palace (Portuguese: Palácio do Jaburu) is the official residence of the vice president of Brazil. The building was designed, along with the rest of the city of Brasília, by Oscar Niemeyer and inaugurated in 1977. It is located near the Alvorada Palace. The name comes from a common bird of the region, the Jabiru.

The building was designed in 1973 and inaugurated in 1977 – seventeen years after the inauguration of Brasília. Adalberto Pereira dos Santos, vice president of Ernesto Geisel, was the first resident, followed by Aureliano Chaves (vice president of João Figueiredo) and Itamar Franco (vice president of Fernando Collor). Marco Maciel (vice president of Fernando Henrique Cardoso) occupied the building from 1995 to 2002.

== The building ==
To the side of the lagoon that gave the name to it and to the edges of the Paranoá Lake, the Jaburu Palace was projected by architect Oscar Niemeyer to be the official residence of the vice president of Brazil, with the urbanistic concept proposed by Lúcio Costa for Brasília.

The main characteristic of the palace and its differential from others, such as the Alvorada Palace, is the fact of it being a construction exclusively destined to housing. Its 4,283 square meters privilege the external area, with generous verandas and common areas.

Located along the Presidential Way, between the palaces of Planalto and Alvorada, the Jaburu Palace is in the topographical level of the Paranoá Lake, occupying an area of 190,000 square meters. In its gardens, projected by landscape designer Roberto Burle Marx, species of typical trees join the ornamental plants brought from other regions of the Brazil.

=== Natural aviary ===
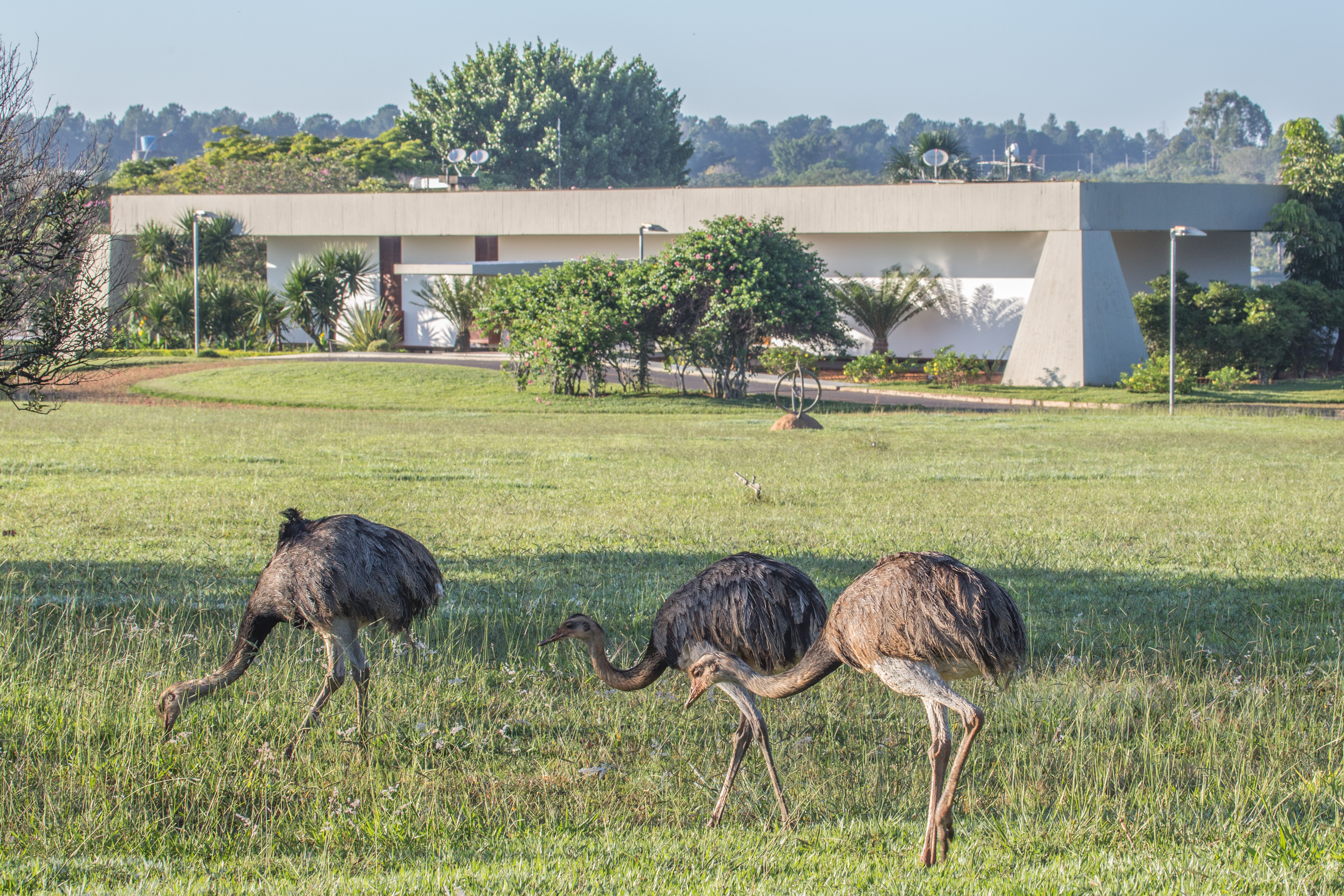
Rheas in the grounds of the Jaburu

The tranquillity of the place helps to transform it into a natural aviary of rheas, that freely circulate in the nearby green areas.

== Gallery ==
=== Interior ===
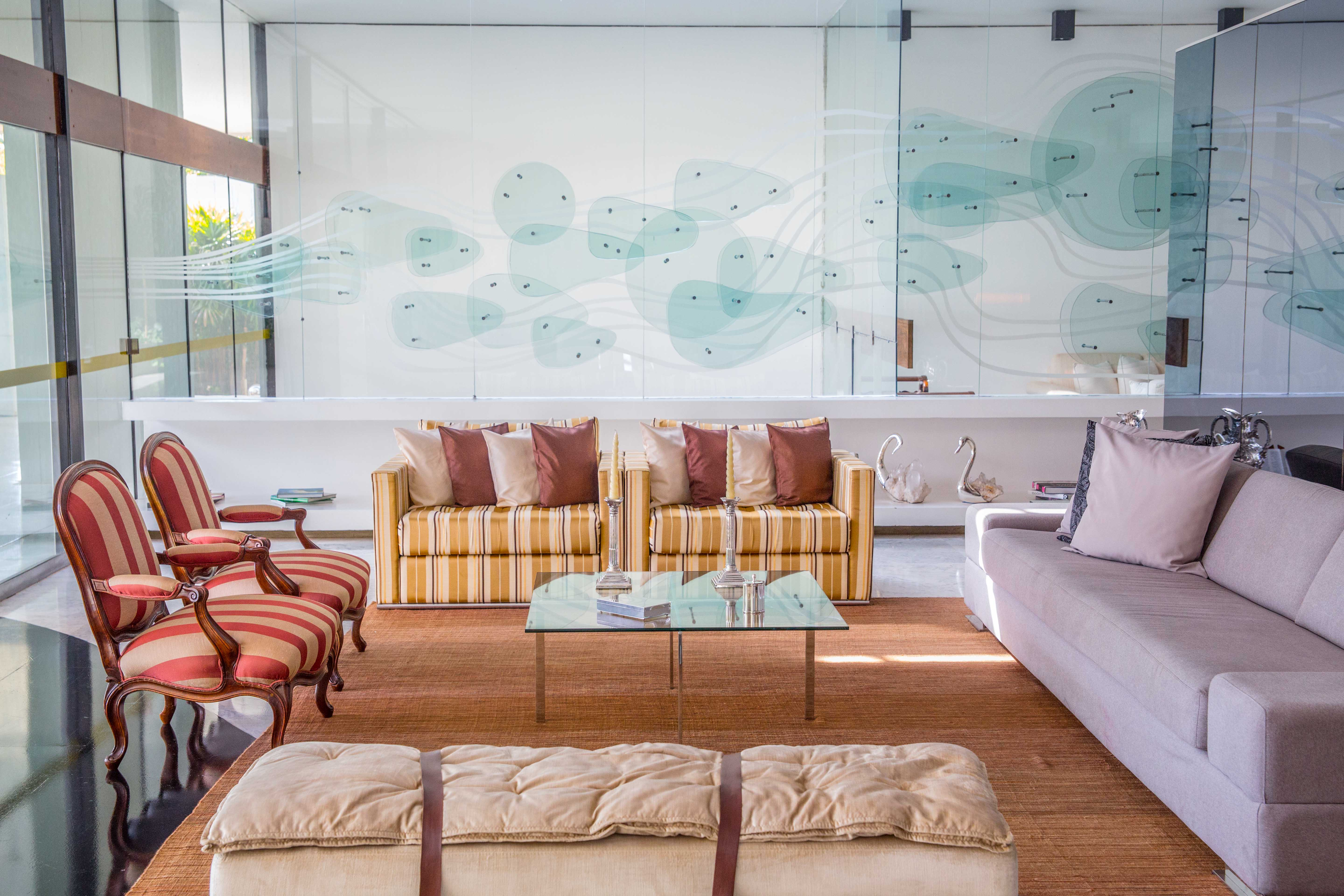
Living Room

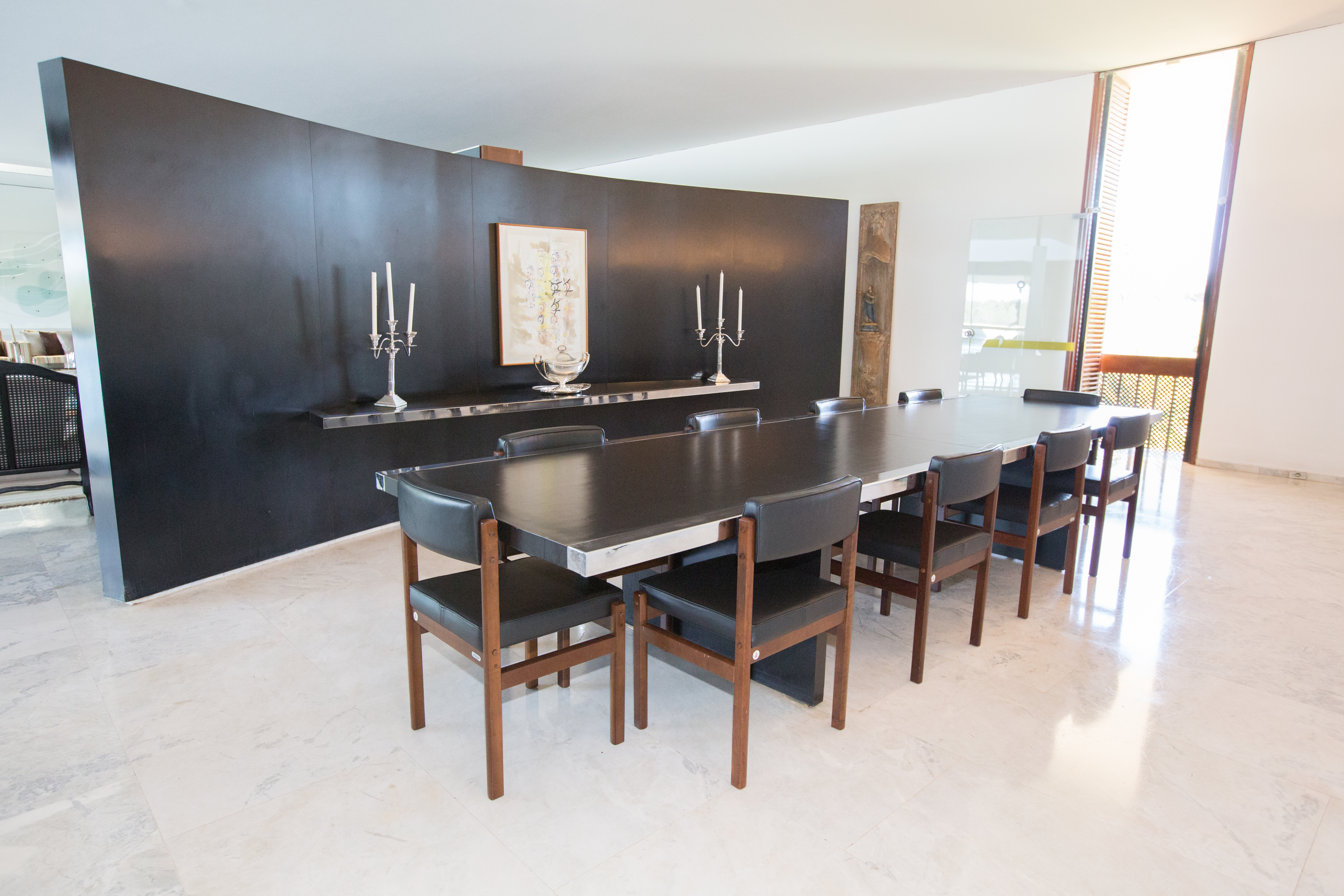
Dining Room

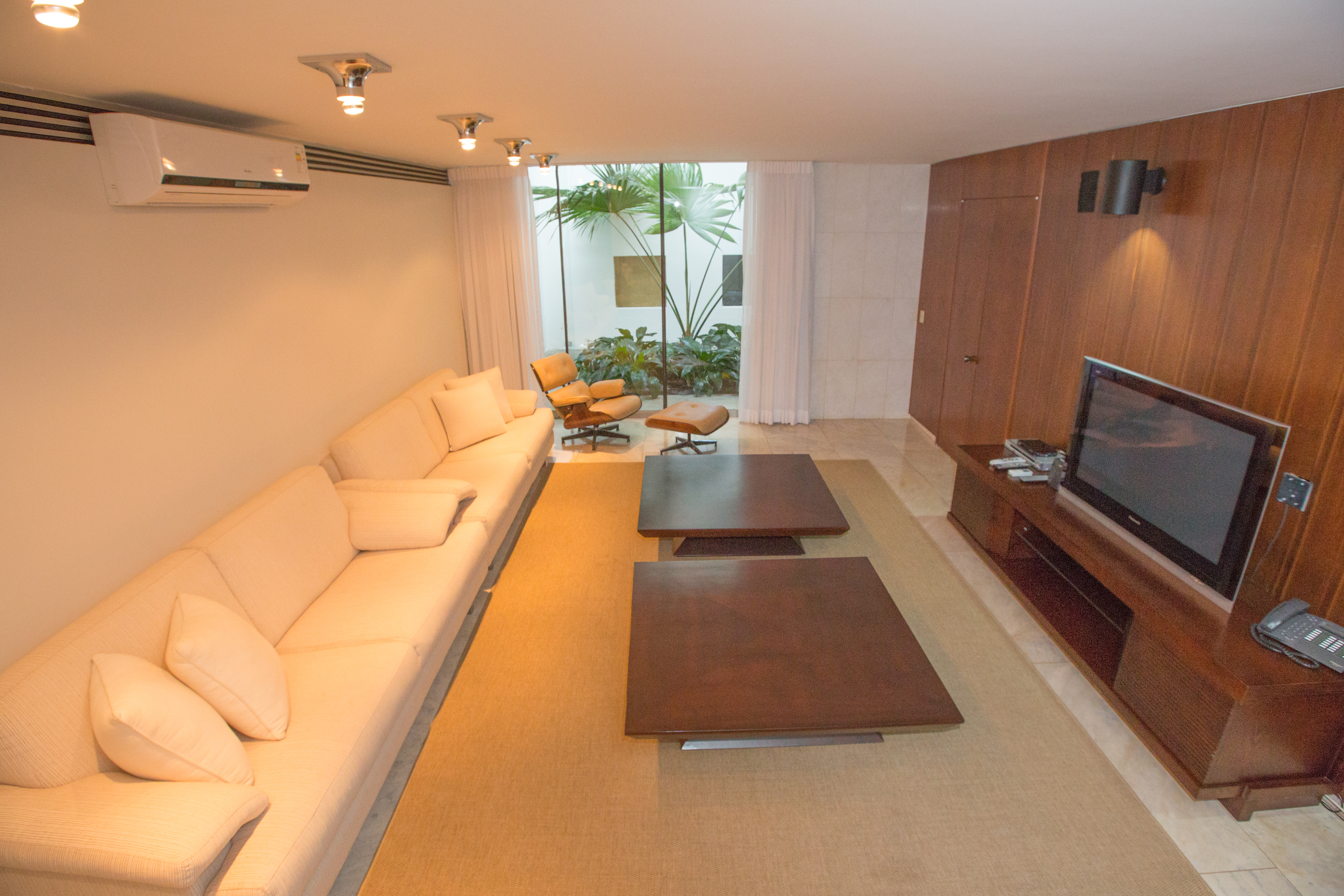
Family Room

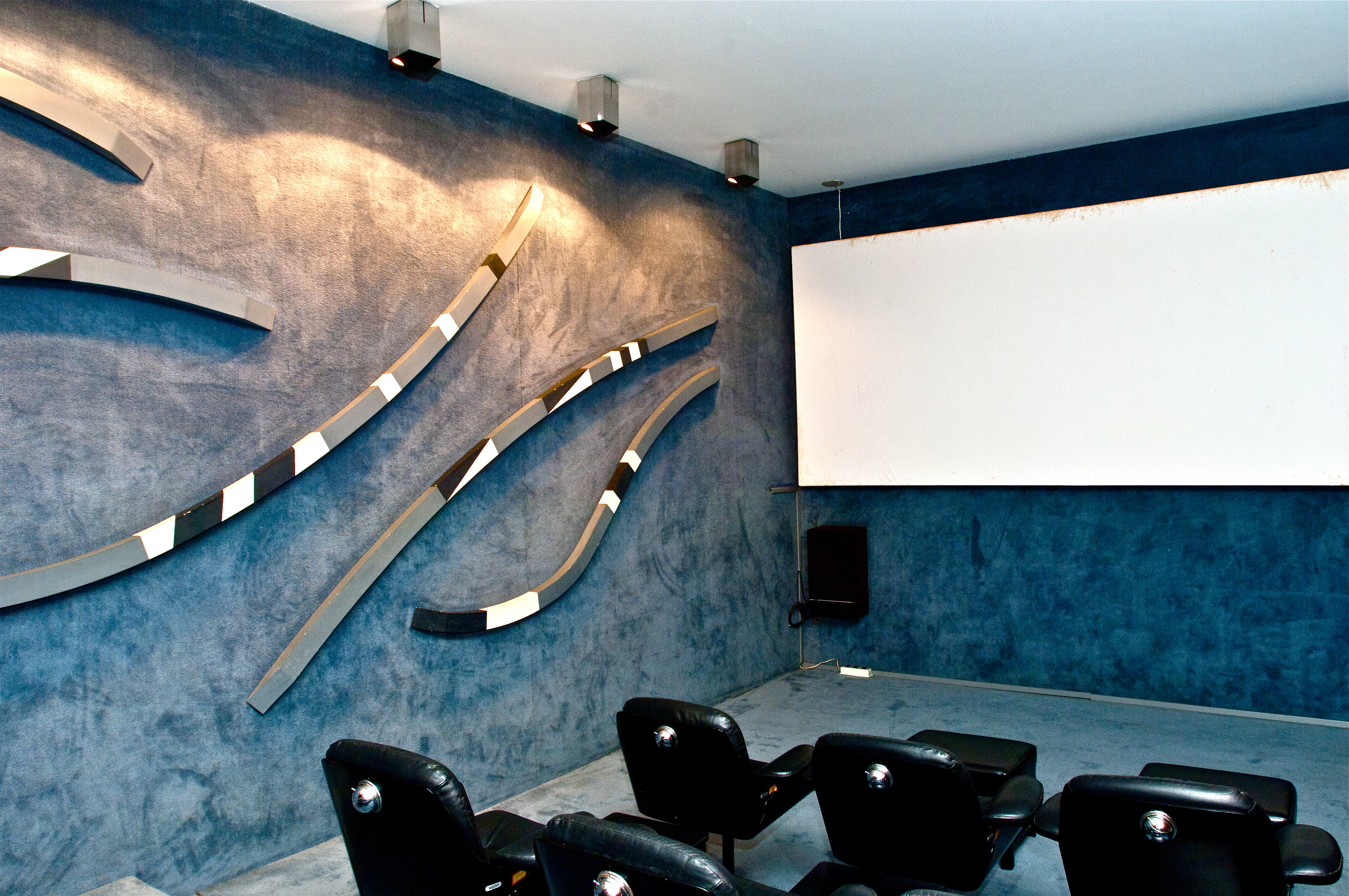
Theater

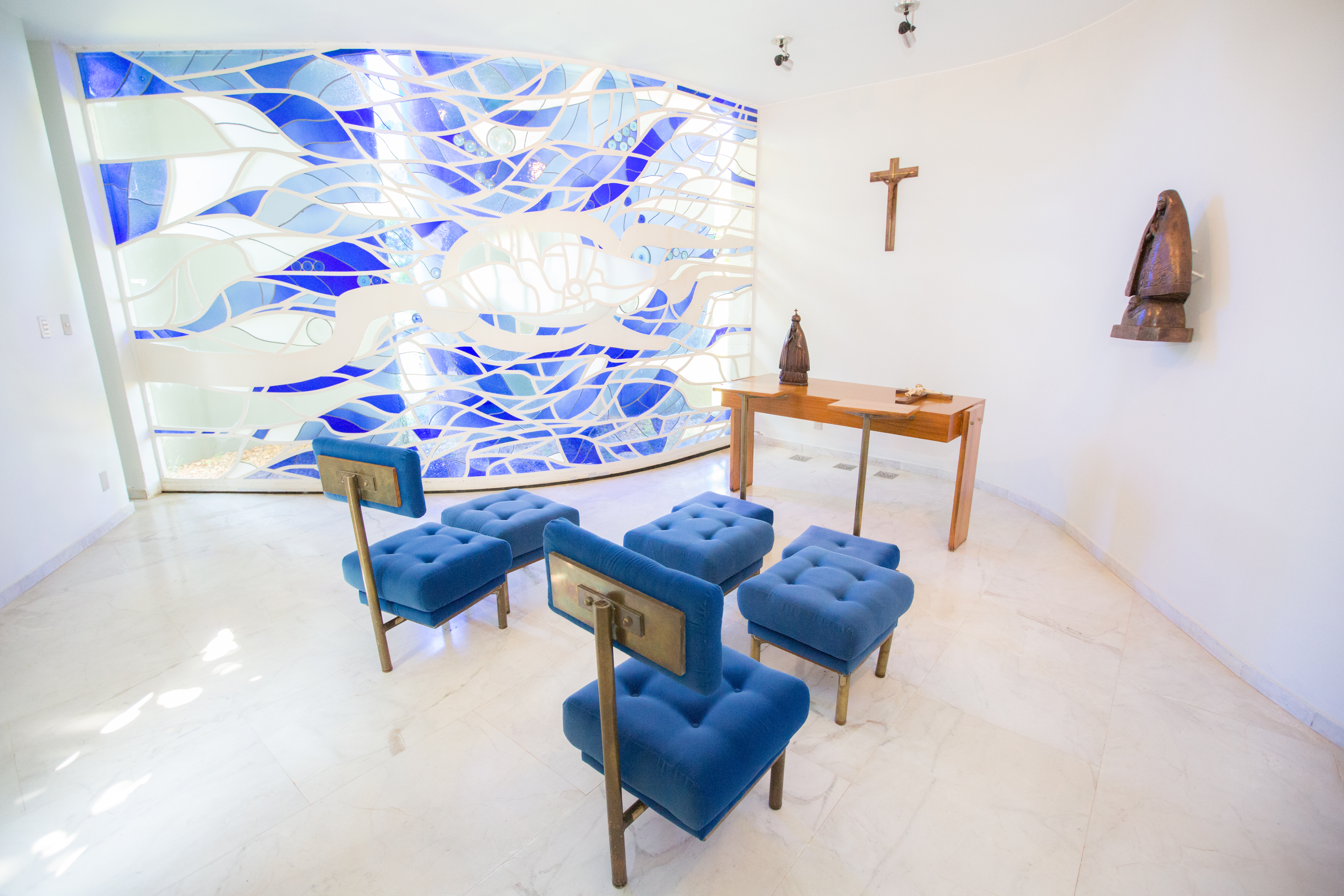
Chapel

=== Exterior ===
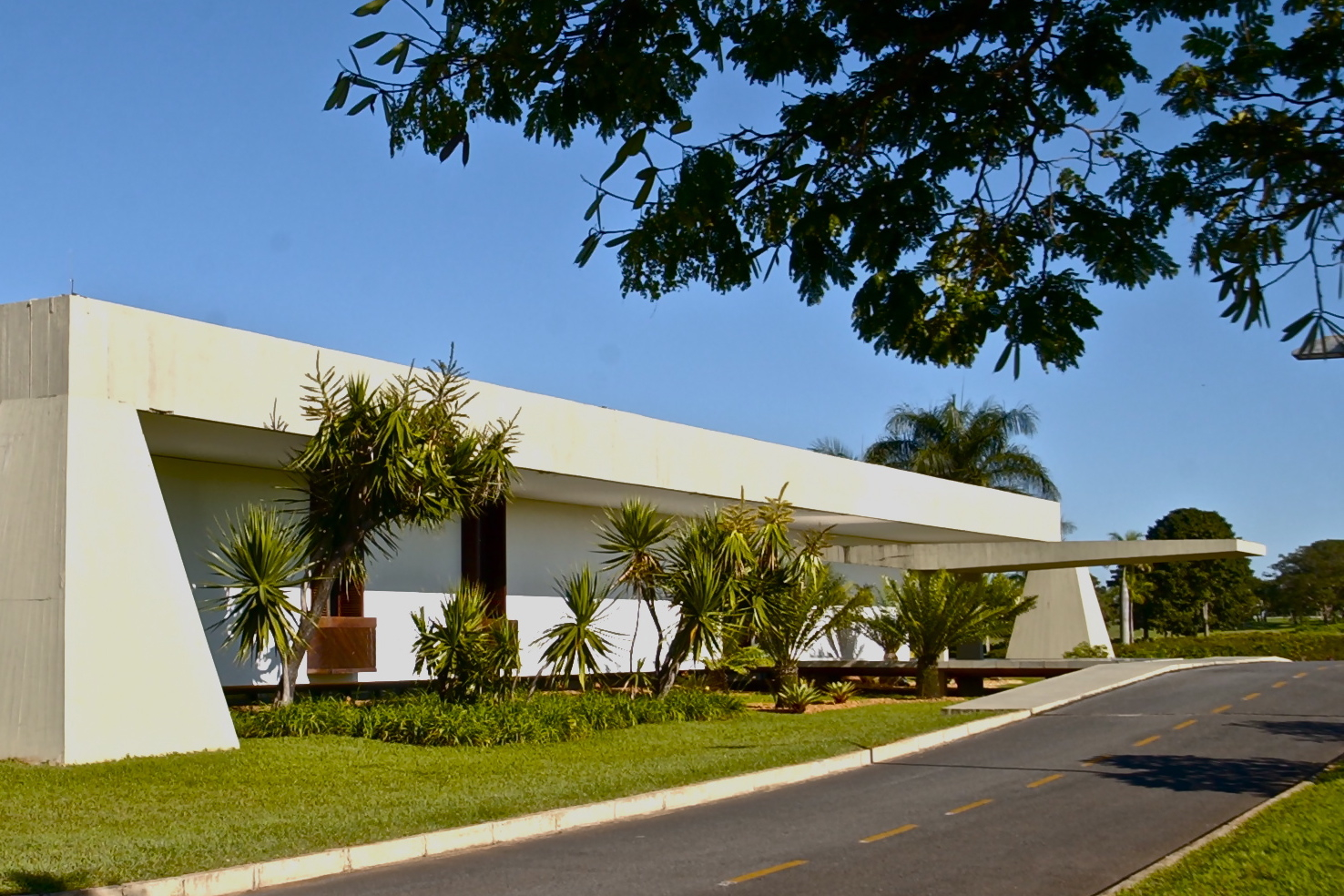
The front entrance to the residence

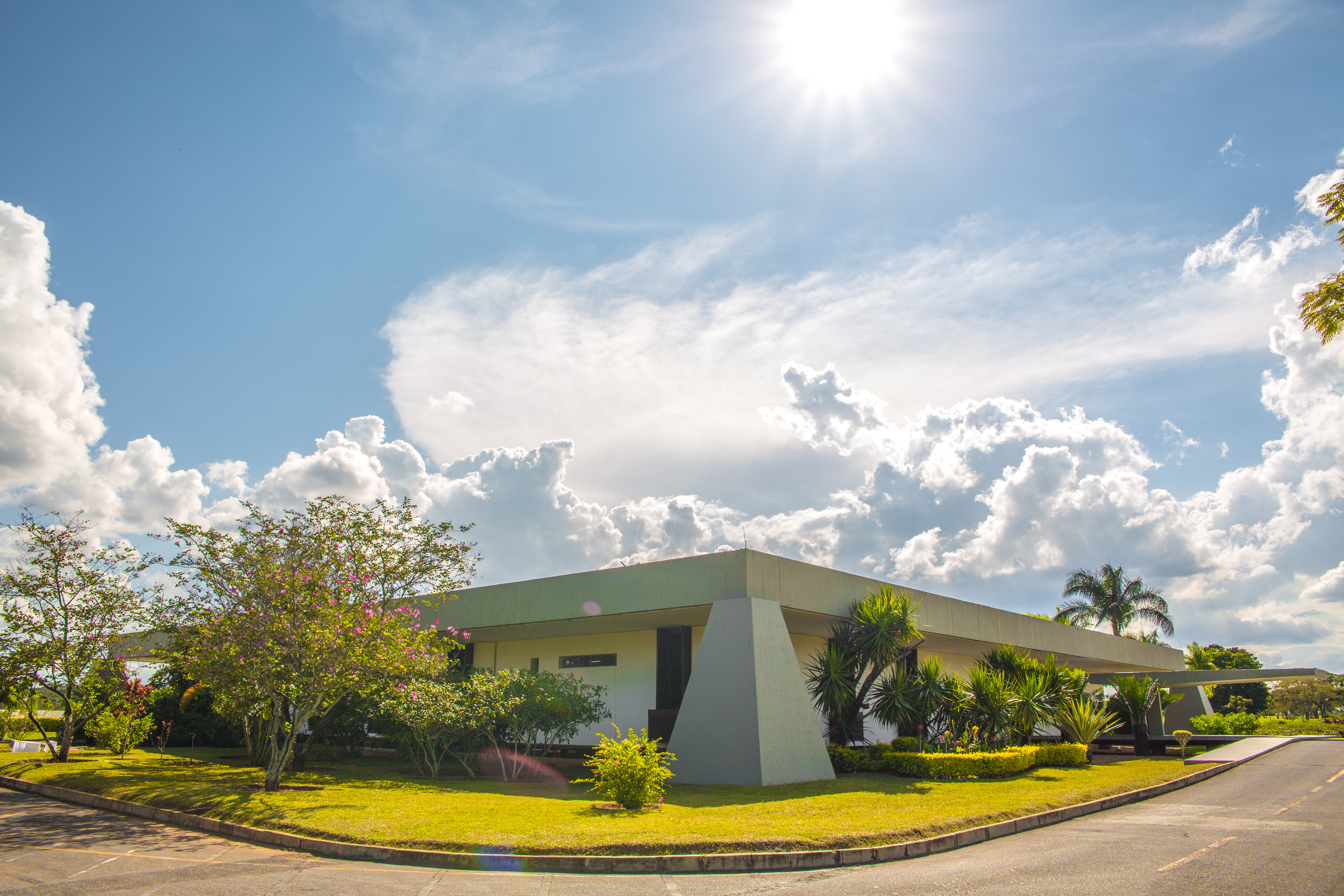
Side view

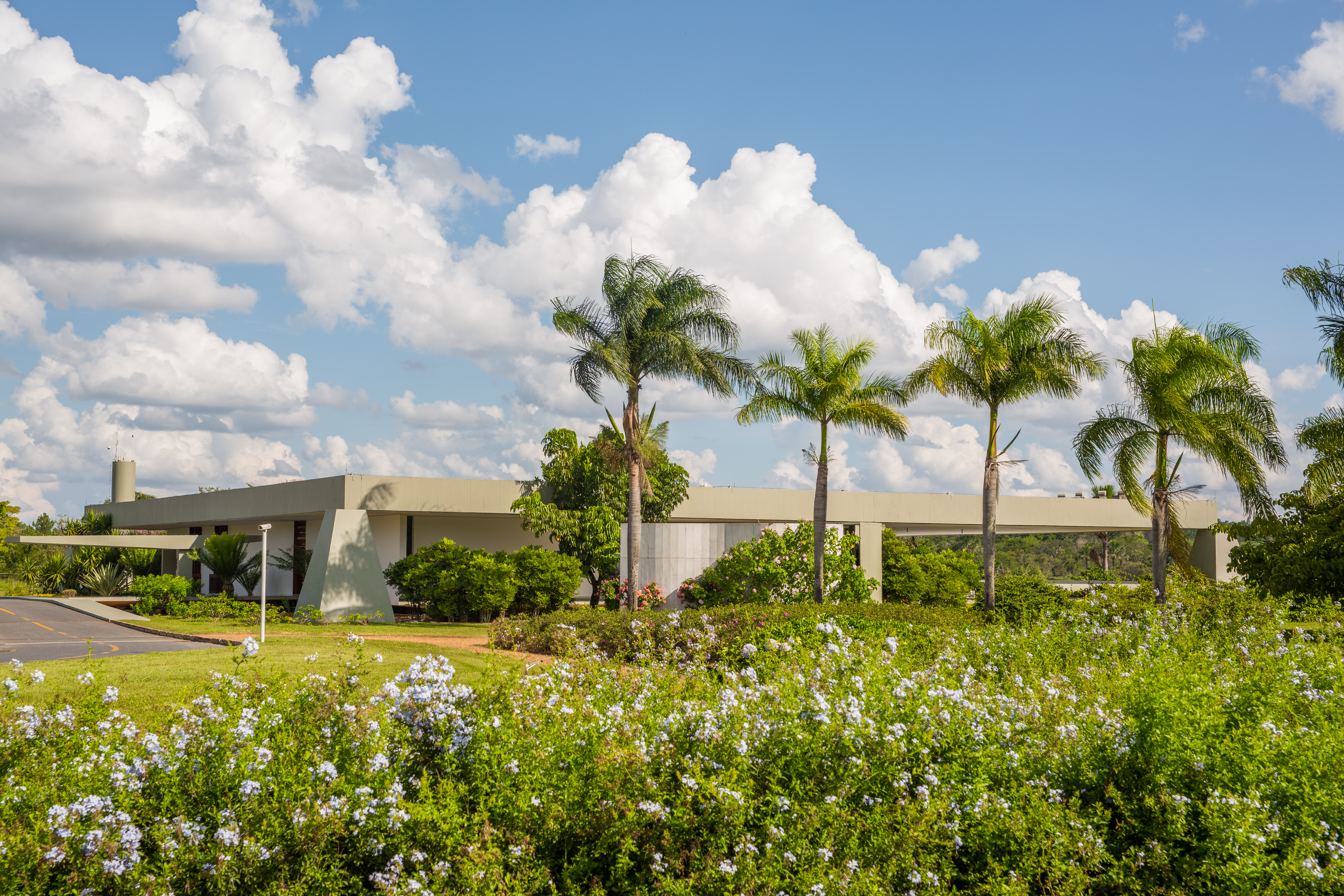
Garden

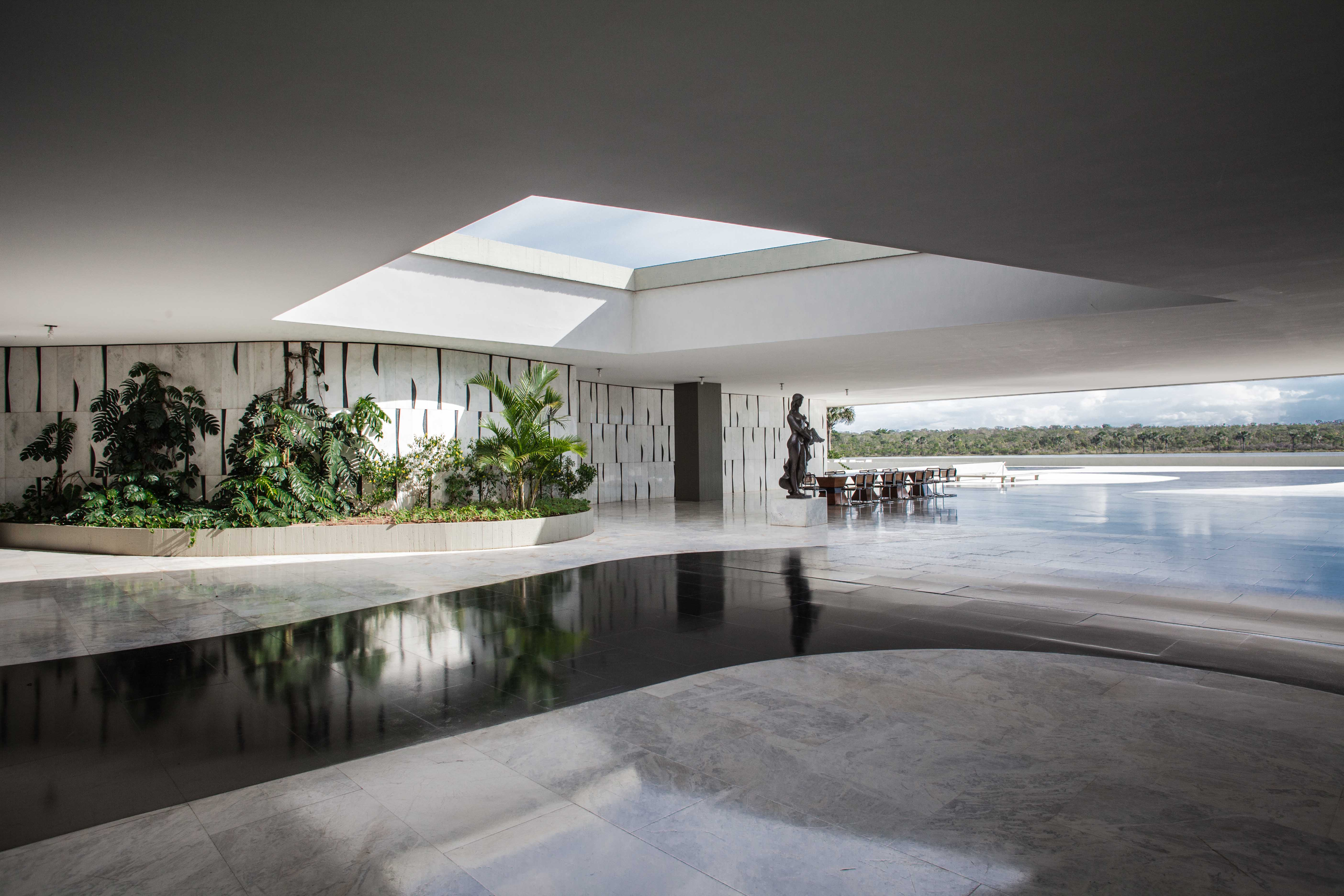
Internal courtyard

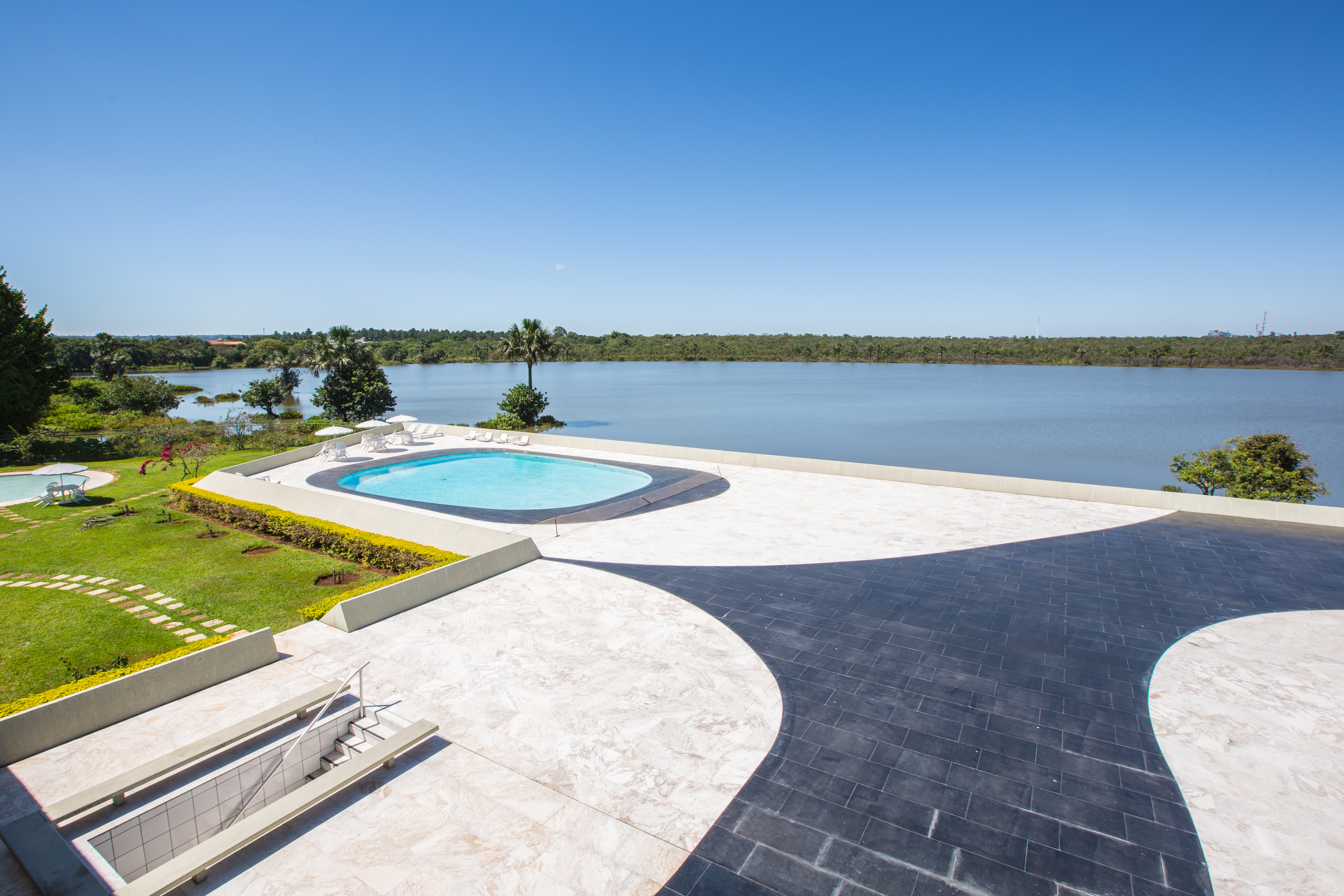
Swimming pool

== See also ==
- Palácio do Planalto
- Palácio da Alvorada
- List of Oscar Niemeyer works
