= Michelle Bolsonaro =

Brazilian politician (born 1982)

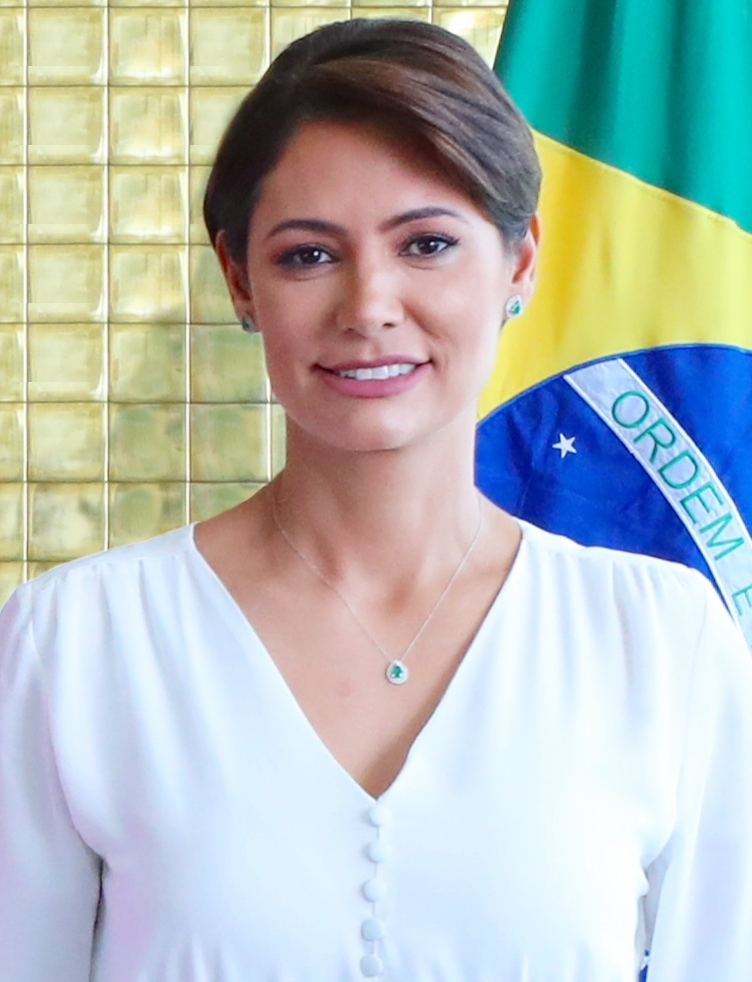
- Bolsonaro in 2022

Senator-elect for the Federal District
- Assuming office 1 February 2027

First Lady of Brazil
- In role 1 January 2019 – 1 January 2023
- President: Jair Bolsonaro
- Preceded by: Marcela Temer
- Succeeded by: Rosângela Lula da Silva

National President of PL Mulher (Note: The female wing of the Liberal Party.)
- In office 21 March 2023 – 30 June 2026
- Party President: Valdemar Costa Neto
- Preceded by: Soraya Santos
- Succeeded by: Position abolished

Personal details
- Born: Michelle de Paula Firmo Reinaldo; 22 March 1982 (age 44) Ceilândia, Federal District, Brazil
- Party: PL (2022–present)
- Spouse: Jair Bolsonaro (m. 2007)
- Domestic partner: Marcos Santos da Silva (separated)
- Children: 2
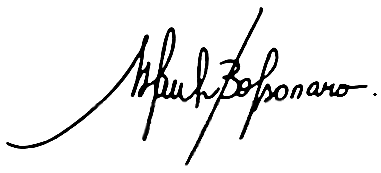
- Signature

Michelle de Paula Bolsonaro (née Firmo Reinaldo; born 22 March 1982) is a Brazilian politician who was the First Lady of Brazil from 2019 to 2023, being the third wife of the 38th President of Brazil, Jair Bolsonaro. As the First Lady, she focused on social initiatives related to people with disabilities, rare diseases, autism awareness, digital inclusion, and the promotion of Brazilian Sign Language (Libras).

Born in Ceilândia, Bolsonaro worked as a salesperson before serving as a parliamentary secretary in the Chamber of Deputies from 2006 to 2007, where she met her future husband, the 38th president of Brazil, Jair Bolsonaro. The couple married in 2007 and have one daughter together, in addition to a daughter from her previous relationship. As First Lady, she became the first spouse of a Brazilian president to deliver part of an inauguration speech in Brazilian Sign Language. Following her husband's defeat in the 2022 presidential election, she assumed a leadership role in PL Mulher, the women’s wing of the Liberal Party (PL).

== Early life and family ==
Born at the Regional Hospital of Ceilândia, an administrative region of the Brazilian Federal District, Michelle Bolsonaro is the daughter of Maria das Graças Firmo Ferreira and Vicente de Paulo Reinaldo. Her father, originally from Crateús, Ceará, is a retired bus driver whose nickname, "Paulo Negão", became nationally known after being referenced by Jair Bolsonaro–Michelle future husband and later president of Brazil–in response to accusations of racism. Her mother is originally from Presidente Olegário, Minas Gerais. Bolsonaro's parents moved to the capital of Brazil, Brasília, in the 1970s and separated while she was still a child.

Both of her parents later remarried and had additional children. Her mother married Antônio Wilton Farias Lima, with whom she had three children: Suyane Lanuze, Geovanna Kathleen, and Yuri Daniel. Her father married Maísa Torres, with whom he had one son, Diego Torres Dourado (born 1988), a member of the Brazilian Air Force. Maísa also had a son from a previous relationship, Carlos Eduardo Antunes Torres (born 1986), who has worked as a photographer, videographer, and driver, and was a former candidate for district deputy for the Progressive Republican Party (PRP). Bolsonaro’s father and stepmother later became owners of a small business specializing in clothing production and event promotion.

Bolsonaro grew up in Ceilândia Norte in a makeshift house at the back of a plot of land that belonged to her mother Maria das Graças' family. She has stated that she lost several teenage friends to drug trafficking in the area. In 2014, her maternal grandfather, Ibraim Firmo Ferreira, a retired street sweeper, was killed during a robbery in Planaltina, Federal District.

Bolsonaro finished high school at a public school in Ceilândia and began working at a young age to help support her family. Her first job was at a Carrefour supermarket, and she later worked at the Extra supermarket as a product demonstrator, even dressing up as a package of pasta to promote the brand. In Brasília, she also worked as an event promoter for various companies and briefly worked as a model, later leaving the profession following advice from a missionary at an evangelical church she attended. In 2004, she worked as a sommelier for the Brazilian brand Vinícola Aurora in the company's Brasília sales office. Soon after, she got a job at the Chamber of Deputies.

Interested in the healthcare field, she enrolled in a pharmacy program at Estácio de Sá University but did not begin the course. She later began studying Portuguese language and literature through distance education at the same institution.

== Political activities ==
Bolsonaro worked as an employee of the Chamber of Deputies between 2006 and 2008. She began at the parliamentary office of Deputy Vanderlei Assis (PP-SP), whose term was recommended to be annulled by the Parliamentary Commission of Inquiry for the "Escândalo dos sanguessugas" in August 2006 Later, he became secretary of Deputy Marco Aurélio Ubiali (PSB-SP). In June 2007, Michelle was nominated for the same position in the leadership of the Progressive Party (PP), remaining until September.

During this period, she had her first contact with her future husband, then federal deputy for the progressives. On 18 September 2007, Michelle became Parliamentary Secretary of Bolsonaro. Just nine days later, they signed a prenuptial agreement at the 1st Public Registry of Brasilia. After about six months of relationship, they registered their civil union on 28 November 2007. In 2008, she was dismissed from the position of Parliamentary Secretary after the Supreme Federal Court understood that the 1988 Constitution prohibited nepotism in public administration.

== Jair Bolsonaro presidential campaigns ==
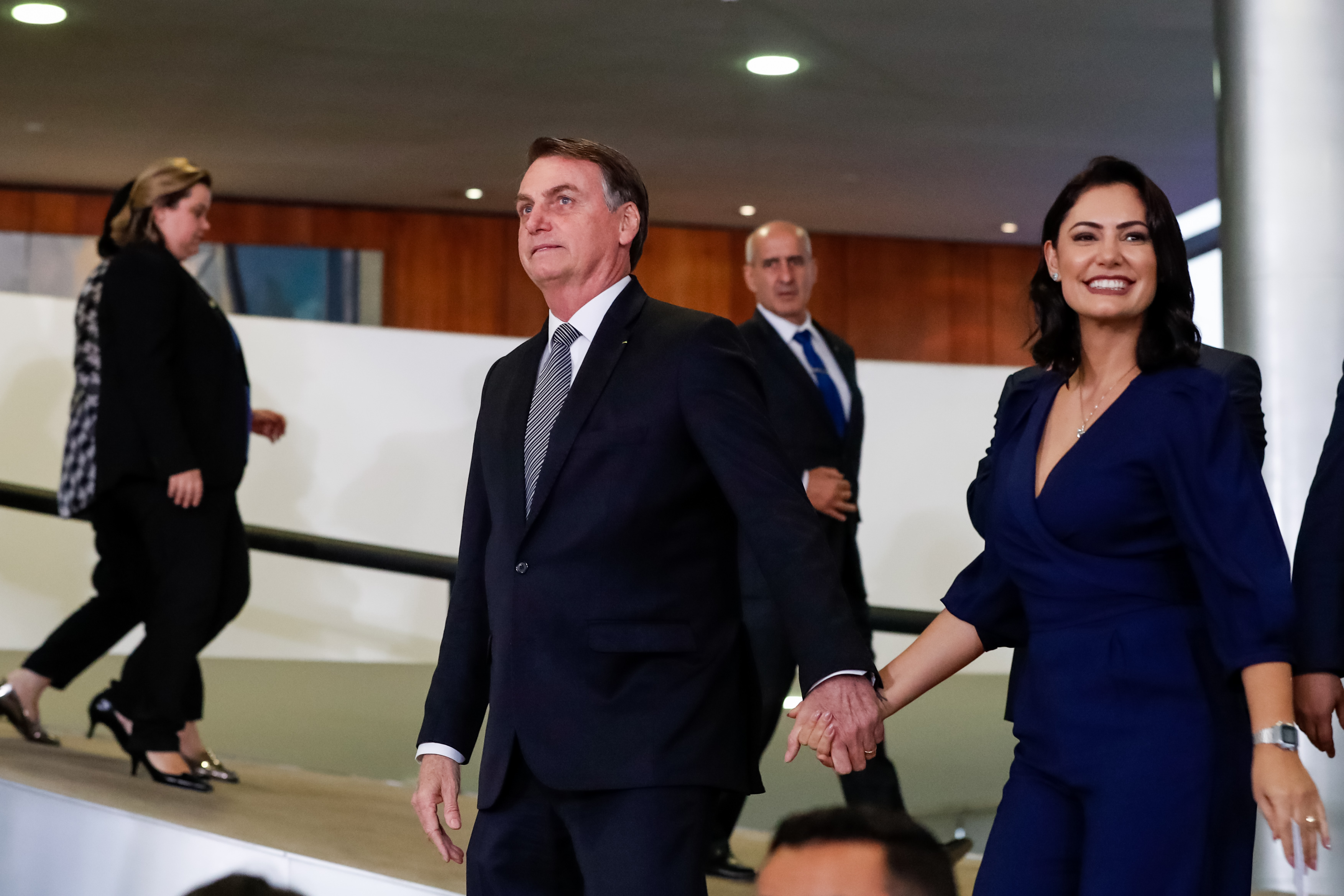
Michelle and Jair Bolsonaro in Brasília, 26 September 2019

During most Jair Bolsonaro's electoral campaign, Bolsonaro did not heavily involve herself actively in his campaign rallies, keeping herself discreet and reserved to the media coverage, but following her husband's path in the backstage.

Bolsonaro's first public appearance in an electoral ad happened on 25 October 2018, three days before the second round of the 2018 Brazilian general election. In the ad, she praised her husband as a "wonderful human being" and "playful". After Jair Bolsonaro was stabbed on 6 September 2018, Bolsonaro followed her husband during his surgical recovery.

After the disclosure of the results of the second round of the presidential election, on the night of 28 October 2018, Jair Bolsonaro finished his victory speech by thanking Michelle Bolsonaro for her support. That same night, the first interview of Michelle Bolsonaro for RecordTV was broadcast. In it, she said that she wanted to "make a difference" in favour of the country and that she "will keep doing her job helping disabled people". She also demonstrated her will to "do missions in the Northeast sertão".

=== 2022 presidential campaign ===
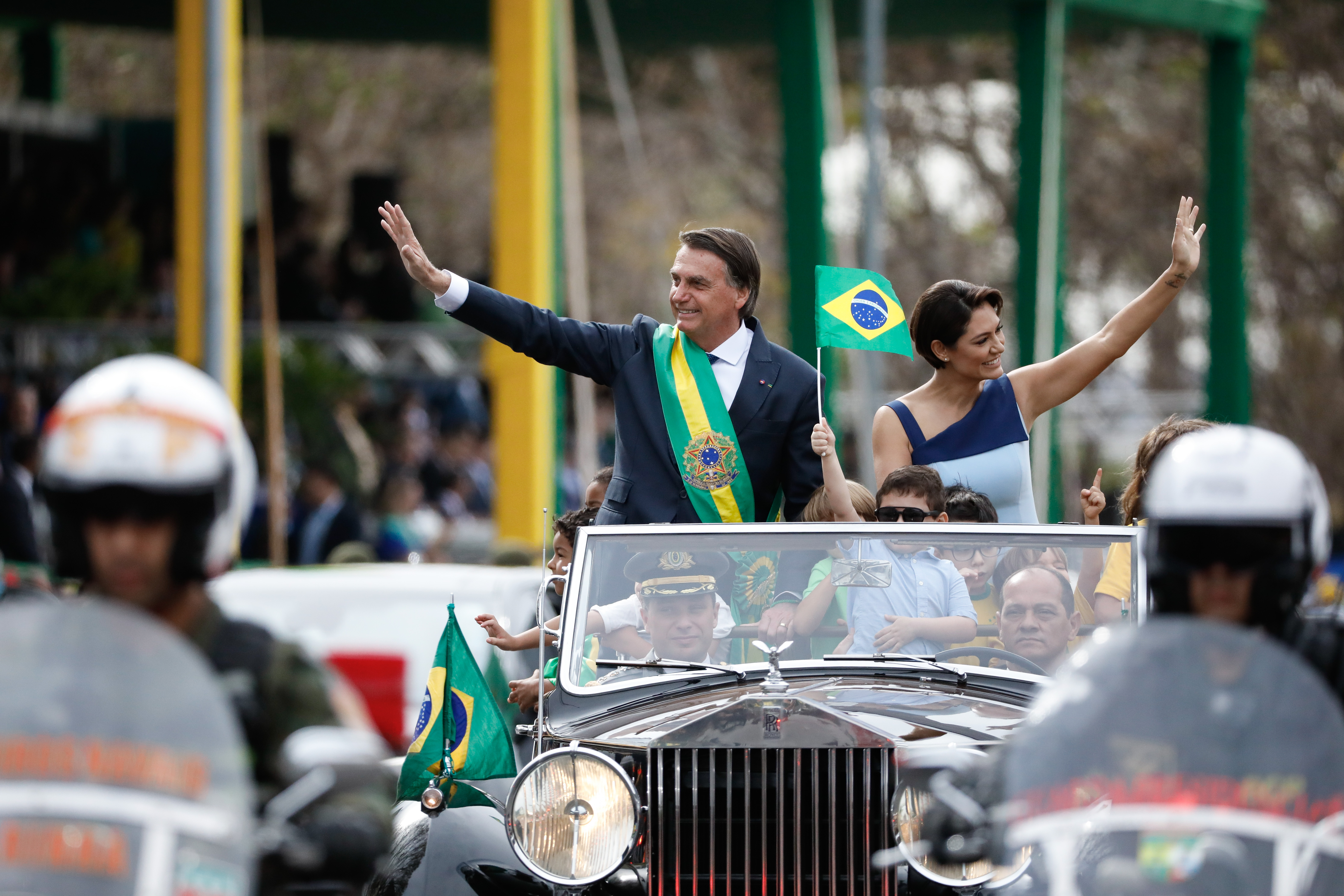
Jair and Michelle Bolsonaro in the presidential Rolls-Royce during the Independence Day parade in Brasilia, 7 September 2022

During the 2022 presidential election, Bolsonaro was noted for her role as a popular surrogate for her husband's campaign.

=== Post-presidential activities ===
After Bolsonaro lost the 2022 presidential election, Bolsonaro was appointed the head of PL Mulher, the women's branch of her husband's political party.

In February 2023, it was reported that Liberal Party figures, including party leader Valdemar Costa Neto, indicated support for nominating Michelle in the 2026 general election should Jair Bolsonaro decline to run. Michelle stated that she would not run amid speculation of a possible candidacy.

After Jair Bolsonaro was barred from travelling abroad, Michelle instead represented him at the Second inauguration of Donald Trump on 20 January 2025.

On 30 June 2026, Michelle has stepped down as the head of PL Mulher following rift with Senator Flávio Bolsonaro, the party's pre-candidate for the presidency.

== First Lady of Brazil (2019–2023) ==
A few days after the 2018 Brazilian general election, which resulted in Jair Bolsonaro becoming the 38th president of Brazil, his wife Michelle Bolsonaro met with then-First Lady Marcela Temer at the Palácio da Alvorada. Previously, on 21 November 2018, Bolsonaro was at the headquarters of the Centro Cultural Banco do Brasil (CCBB), where she announced that, upon taking on the role of First Lady the following January, she would engage in social causes where her participation was possible and outlined her main focus on people with special needs.

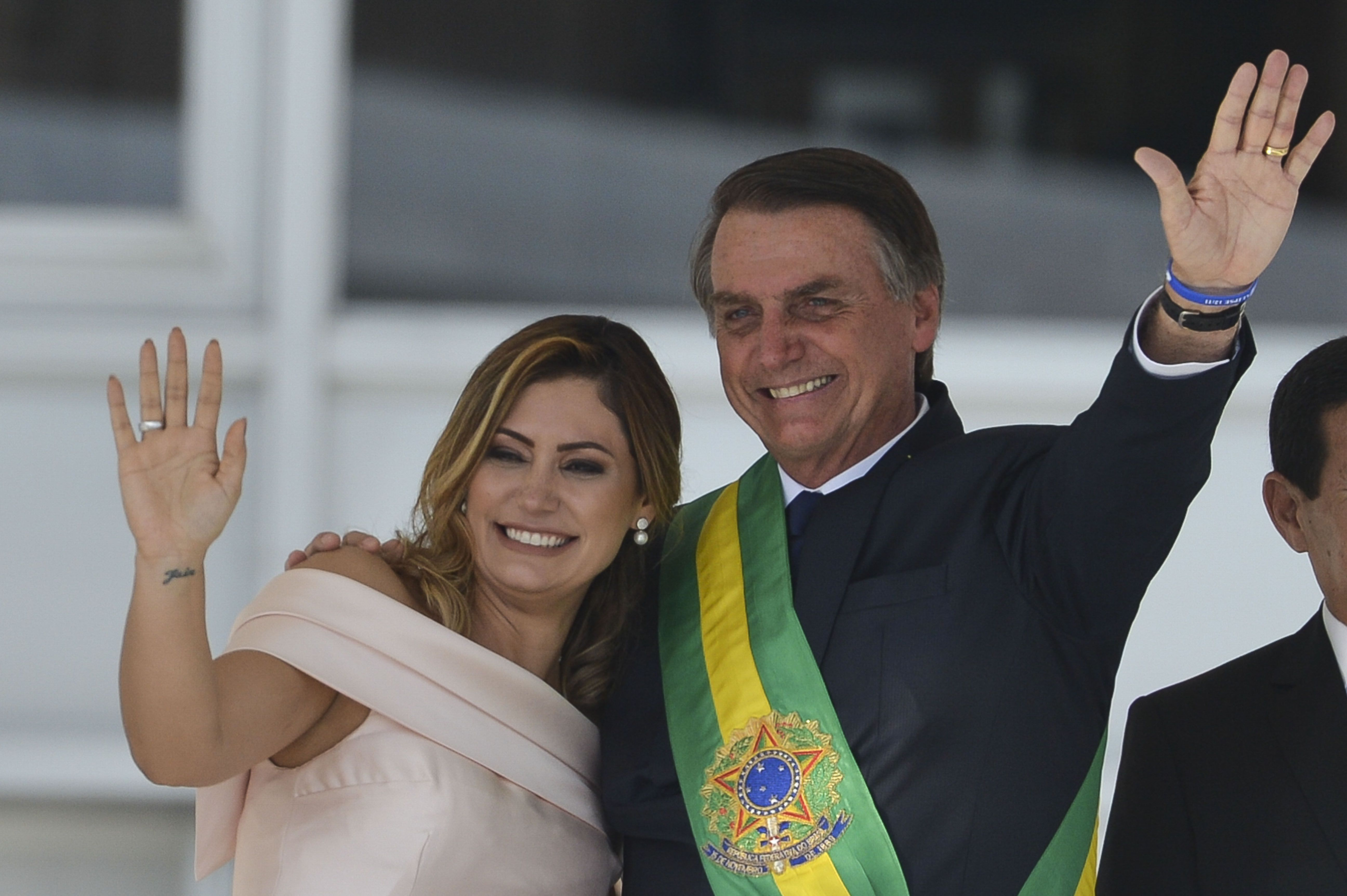
First Lady Michelle alongside her husband, Jair Bolsonaro, at the inauguration in 2019.

At the traditional inauguration ceremony, Bolsonaro surprised everyone by giving a speech in Brazilian Sign Language (Libras) at the podium of the Palácio do Planalto, being the first spouse of a president of the Brazil to do so. In her speech, she reiterated her commitment to social actions aimed at people with disabilities:

I would like, in a very special way, to address the deaf community, people with disabilities, and all those who feel forgotten: you will be valued and your rights will be respected. I have this calling in my heart and I wish to contribute to the promotion of human beings.

On 29 March 2019, Bolsonaro and her husband participated in a charity tea organized by the NGO União Brasileiro Israelita do Bem-Estar Social (Unibes), focused on families in situations of social vulnerability. The event raised 5.3 million reais for the organization and took place in São Paulo, at the residence of businessman and philanthropist Elie Horn, who plans to create a permanent fund for the first lady's social projects.

Bolsonaro attended the 10th edition of the Banco do Brasil Foundation Award for Social Technologies. It was the first time the first lady participated in this initiative, having been invited to deliver the winner's trophy in the special category of the program linked to the State Health Department of Rio Grande do Sul, called Better Early Childhood.

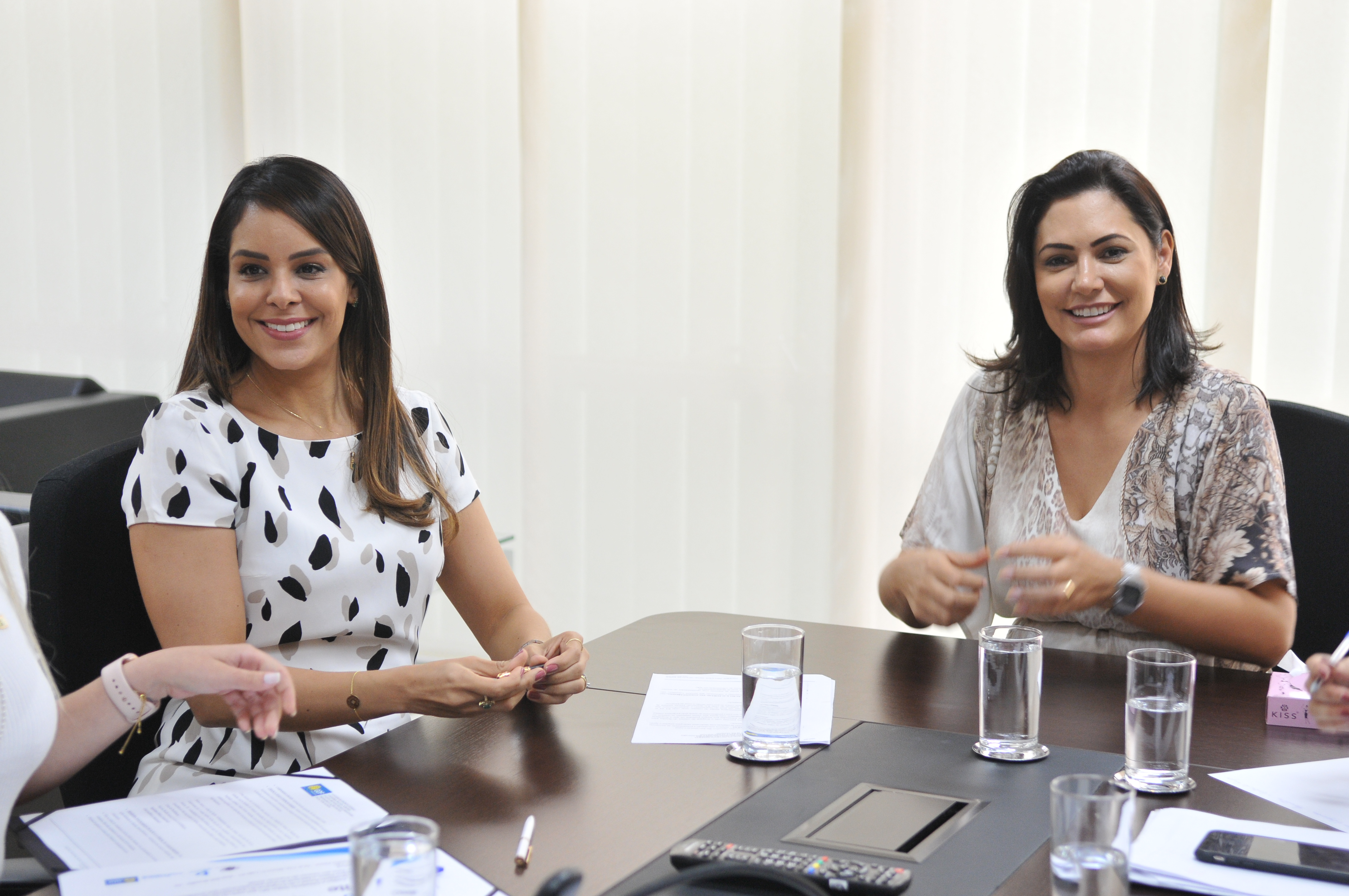
Bolsonaro receives the First Lady of the Federal District, Mayara Noronha, on August 20, 2019.

On 23 October 2019, she attended the Américas Amigas event, an NGO fighting breast cancer. Besides the first lady, other guests such as TV host Ana Hickmann were also present. She also visited the headquarters of the Associação de Assistência à Criança Deficiente (AACD).

Bolsonaro visited the Hospital de Amor in Barretos, learning about some projects such as the Bella Vita rehabilitation project —receiving the title of project patron— the Bone Marrow Transplant Center, and the children and youth unit, accompanying patients and their respective care, putting her volunteer work into practice. Bolsonaro also participated in a makeup course, distributing wigs to women undergoing cancer treatment. She also met with coordinators, volunteers, directors, and collaborators of the Hospital de Amor in Barretos, presenting her actions leading the Pátria Voluntária program.

On 30 October 2019, she traveled to the capital of Goiás, Goiânia, at the invitation of the state’s first lady, Gracinha Caiado, to attend the launch ceremony of the Volunteer Platform held by the Organização das Voluntárias de Goiás (OVG). With the presence of Governor Ronaldo Caiado, the new platform aims to provide easy access for all those willing to volunteer spontaneously. At the end of the event, Bolsonaro took part in a local cultural dance accompanied by Gracinha Caiado and Mayara Noronha.

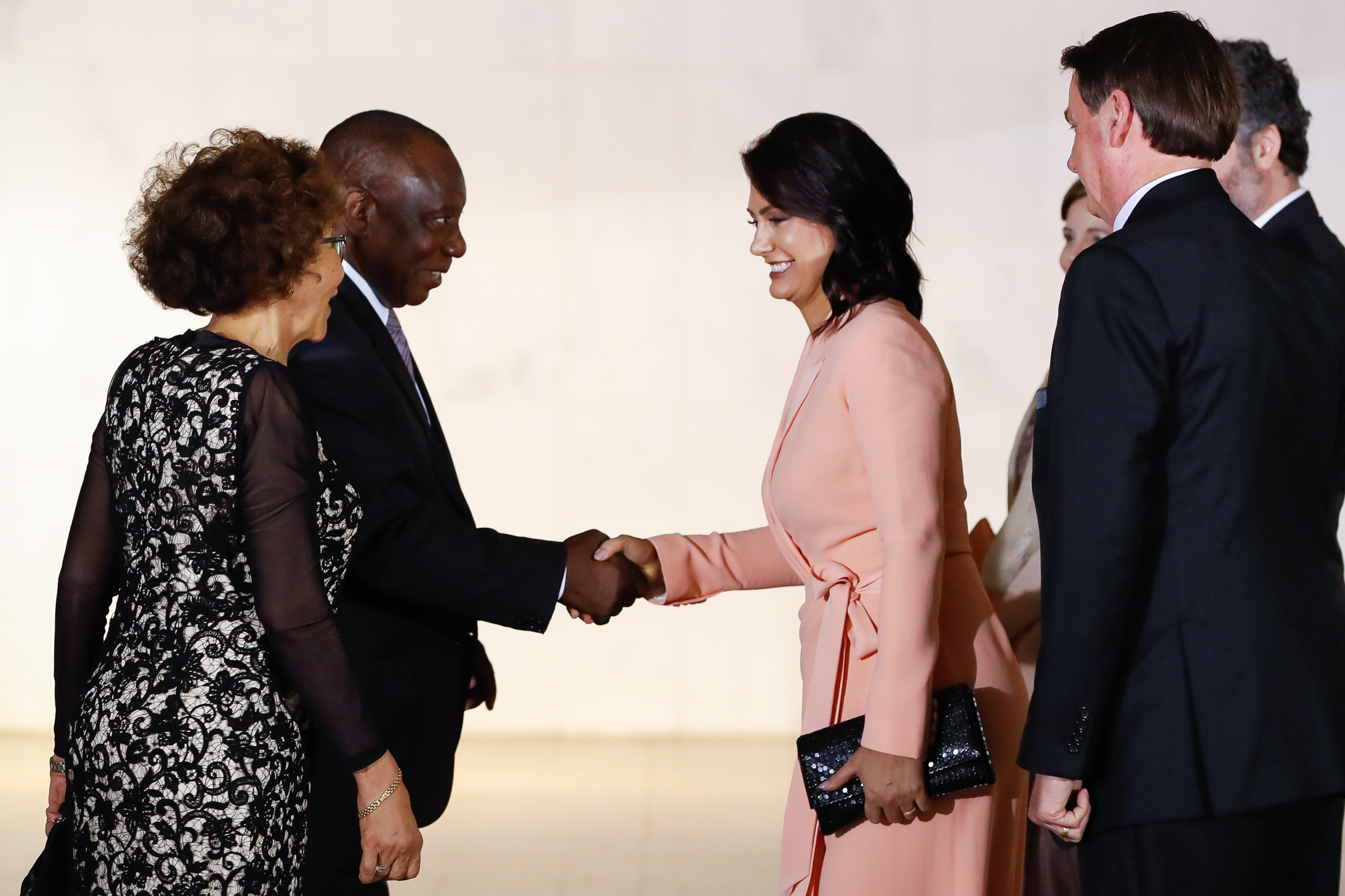
Bolsonaro greets Cyril Ramaphosa, President of South Africa, and First Lady Tshepo Motsepe.

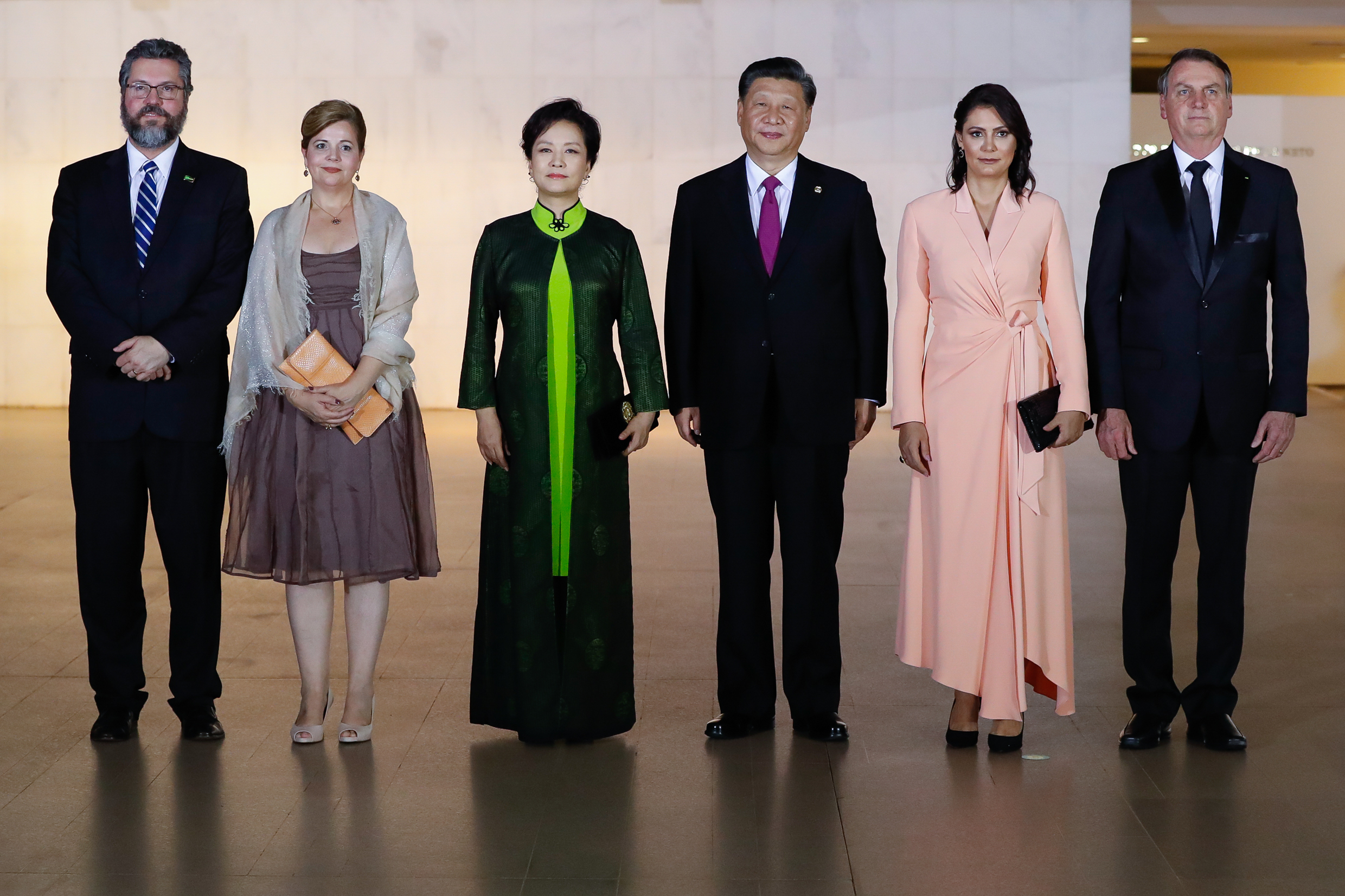
The Bolsonaro couple alongside Xi Jinping, President of China, First Lady Peng Liyuan, Ernesto Araújo, Minister of Foreign Affairs, and his wife.

On 13 November 2019, at the Palácio da Alvorada, during an official state visit related to the 11th BRICS summit, Bolsonaro welcomed Peng Liyuan and Tshepo Motsepe, the first ladies of China and South Africa, respectively, at the Alvorada Palace, and took them on a tour of the residence. A luncheon was offered by the Brazilian hostess to the guests, where they watched a performance by the Orchestra of the Arte Jovem Musical Project of Ceilândia, featuring local music such as forró and samba, attended by the Minister of Women, Family and Human Rights, Damares Alves. In the evening, to honor the stay of the heads of state and their spouses in the Brazilian capital, a dinner was hosted for the leaders in one of the halls of the Itamaraty Palace, where they enjoyed a performance by the Orquestra Criança Cidadã. The Vice President Hamilton Mourão, the Second Lady Paula Mourão, ministers, members of the Brazilian and foreign governments, and other authorities also attended the banquet. Michelle accompanied President Bolsonaro to the capital of Amazonas to participate in the 1st Sustainability Fair of the Manaus Industrial Pole. At the event, the first lady drew attention for the simplicity of her attire and for reciprocating the warm reception she received by sitting on the floor of the Studio 5 Convention Center, in the South Zone of Manaus. Present were the Governor of Amazonas, Wilson Miranda Lima, and First Lady Taiana Lima.

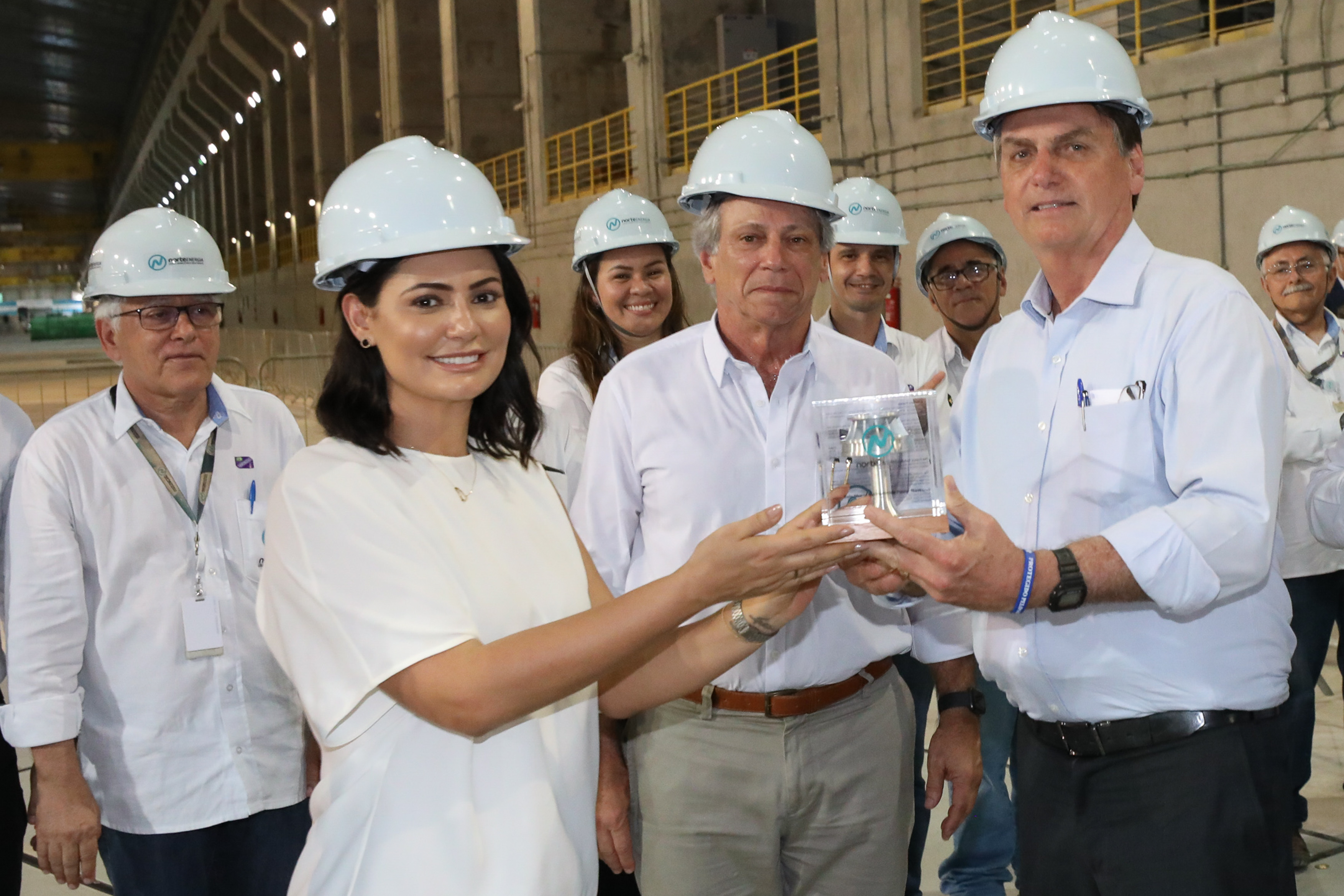
First Lady Michelle with President Bolsonaro at the inauguration ceremony of the Belo Monte Hydroelectric Power Plant, November 2019.

In Vitória do Xingu, in the state of Pará, Bolsonaro attended the inauguration ceremony of the 18th and final turbine of the Belo Monte Hydroelectric Power Plant, which began operating at the highest installed capacity among national hydroelectric plants, with 11,233.1 megawatts of power, becoming the largest 100% Brazilian-operated hydroelectric plant.

In Brasília, Bolsonaro was present at the Madalena Caputo Institute where, through the Pátria Voluntária program, she participated in a commemorative Christmas social action.

At the Hospital de Base in Brasília, Bolsonaro walked along the "pink corridor," where the Women's Network for Combating Cancer is located, an association that runs about 30 social projects, delivering basic food baskets and wigs, and distributing snacks to hospital companions and visitors. She praised the initiative and embraced all members of the project. She also visited the oncology treatment area in the chemotherapy room, delivering scarves with messages to women fighting cancer, receiving hugs from patients and healthcare professionals.

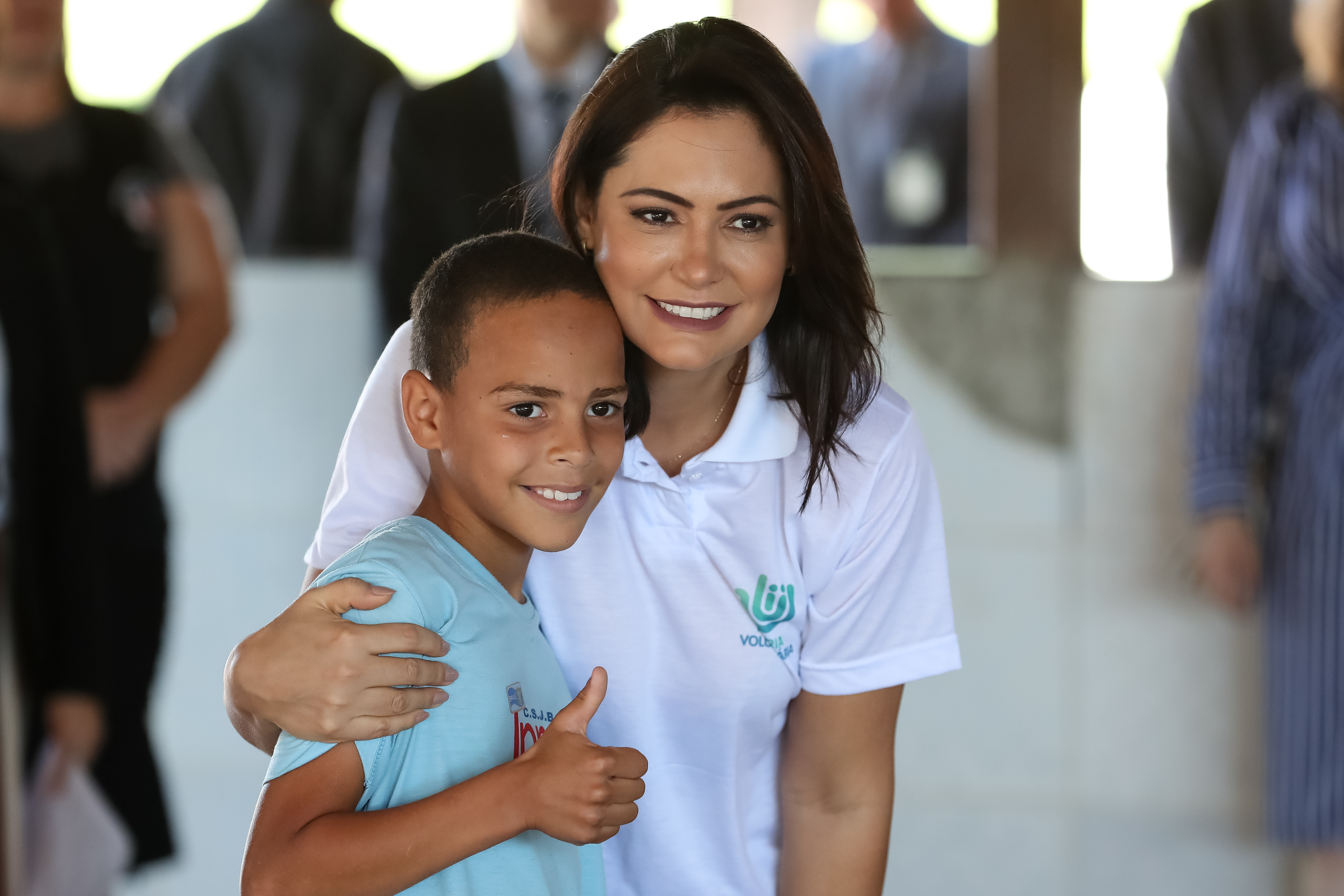
Bolsonaro during a visit to the Madalena Caputo Promotional Institute

President Bolsonaro and First Lady held a Christmas Carol concert at the Palácio da Alvorada to celebrate the Christmas festivities, a ceremony that brought together members of the Brazilian government, including ministers, senators, deputies, employees of the palaces that make up the presidency of the Republic, and their respective families. There was also a distribution of gifts and souvenirs for children from public schools who attended the event. On the same day, she was present at the musical concert performance of the Wind and Percussion Orchestra of the Musical Project Arte Jovem, from Ceilândia, the neighborhood where she was born and lived.

The first lady traveled to São José dos Pinhais, a municipality in the state of Paraná, to participate in the ceremony for the delivery of vehicles provided to the protection network of the Unified Social Assistance System made available by the federal government, in order to facilitate assistance to families suffering from vulnerability, and who lack public transport and accessibility in the assistance network. Michelle emphasized that the vehicles are priorities for the development and practice of projects aimed at ensuring the lives of children, especially those suffering from special needs.

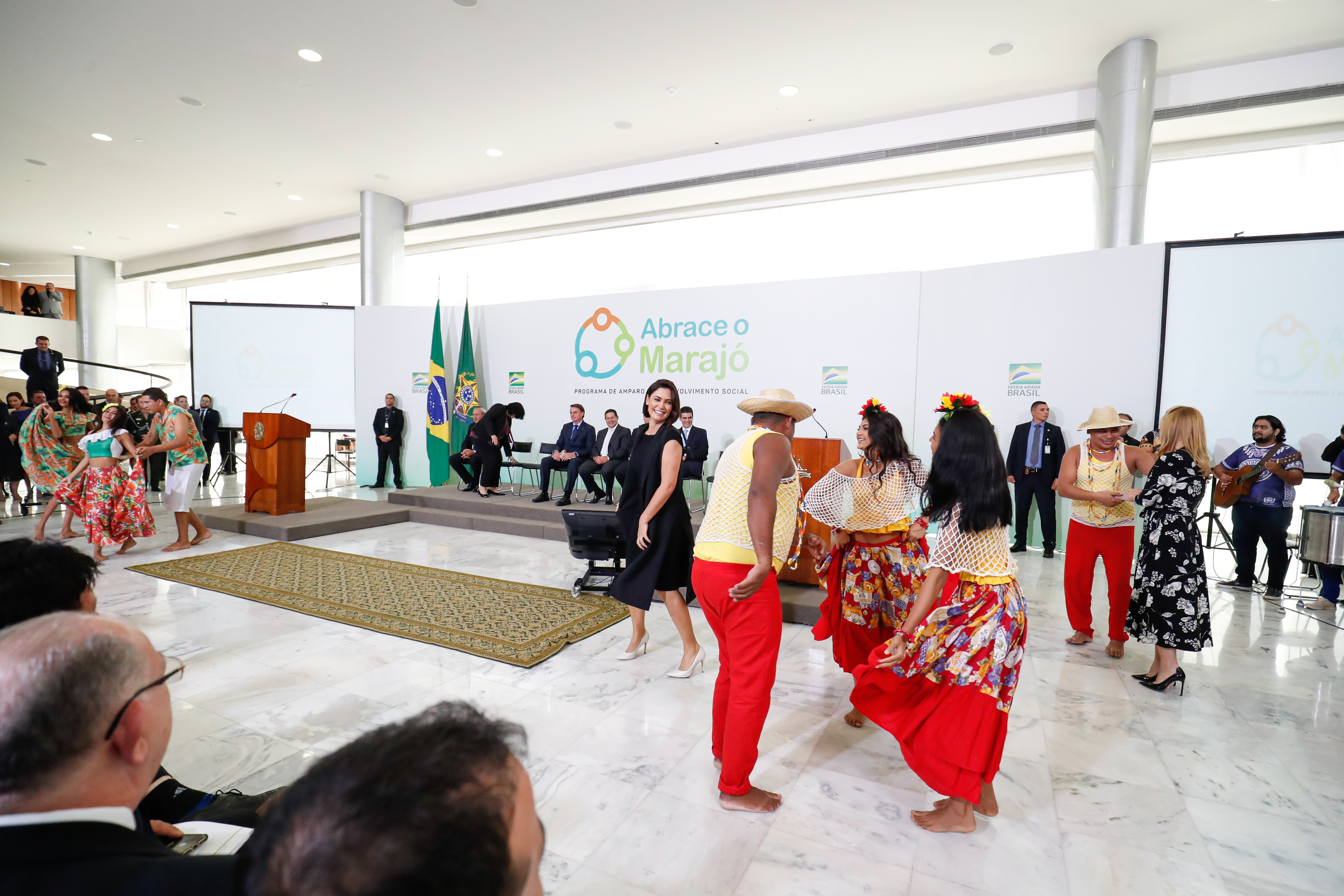
Bolsonaro dances Carimbó, typical of Marajó.

Bolsonaro participated in the launch ceremony of the "Abrace o Marajó" Program at the Palácio do Planalto. The first lady subsequently received the mayors and first ladies of each municipality in the Marajó region at the Palácio da Alvorada, where she emphasized "the Abrace o Marajó project, which is bringing hope to the people of the region."

Bolsonaro met with the wife of the Prime Minister of Armenia, Anna Hakobyan, at the Palácio da Alvorada, where they exchanged experiences on social assistance and volunteer projects developed between the two countries. Bolsonaro explained that even though they are physically far apart, the two women live similar realities, and that in their role as first ladies, they want to contribute to ensuring that their peoples have a better life.

In May 2022, the Liberal Party (PL) confirmed Bolsonaro's membership in the party. Michelle's membership followed the membership of Jair and two of his sons, Flávio and Eduardo Bolsonaro, in the party.

== Personal life ==
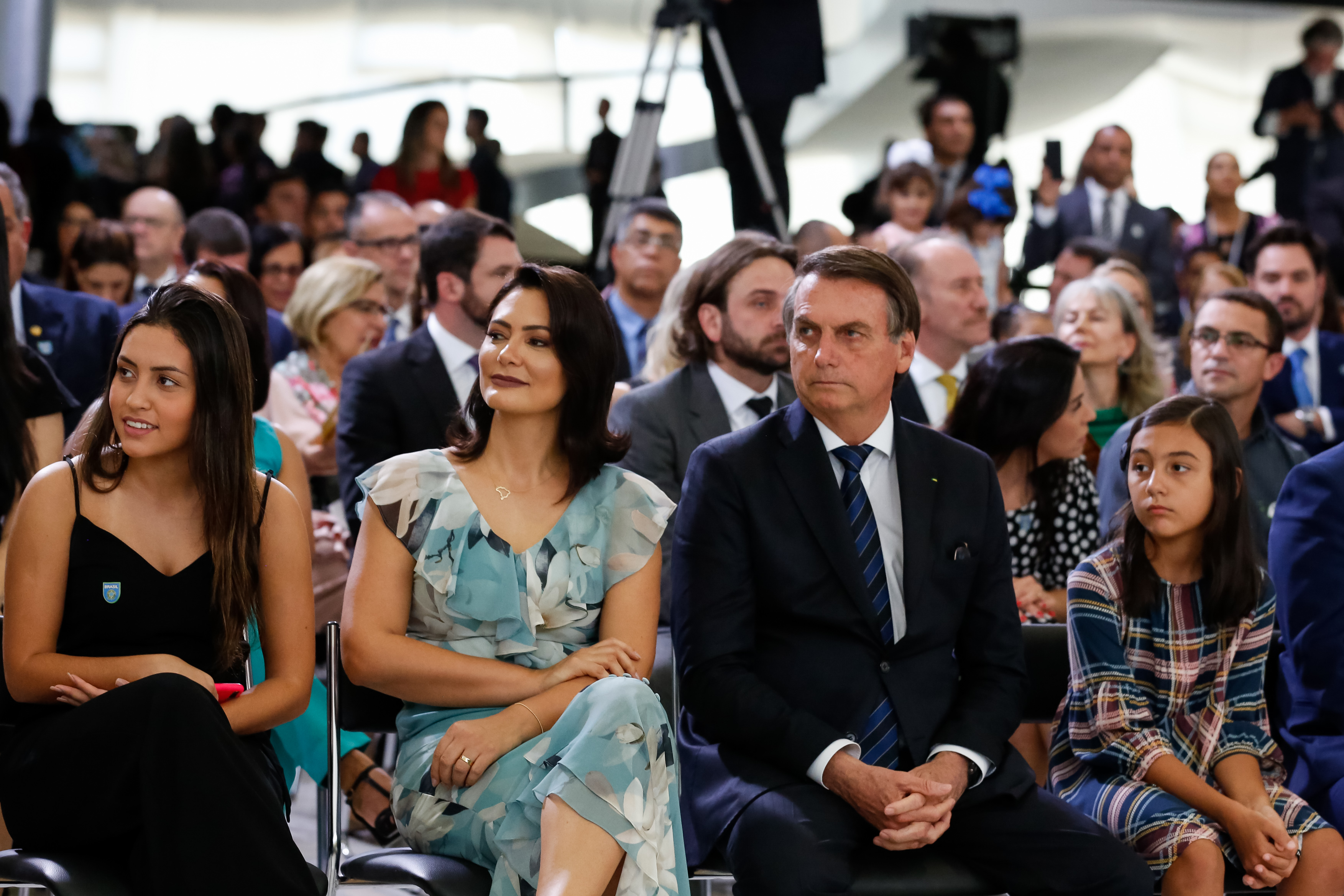
Michelle alongside her husband Jair Bolsonaro and their two daughters, Letícia and Laura, in December 2019.

Michelle, who prefers to be called by her full compound name, Michelle de Paula, has two daughters: Letícia Marianna Firmo da Silva, from her previous relationship with Marcos Santos da Silva, and Laura Bolsonaro, from her marriage to Jair Bolsonaro. The couple married on 21 March 2013, at a party venue in the Alto da Boa Vista neighborhood in Rio de Janeiro. The date was chosen to coincide with their birthdays, 21 and 22 March, respectively. At Michelle’s request, the ceremony, attended by 150 guests, was conducted by Pastor Silas Malafaia, one of the leaders of the Assembleia de Deus Vitória em Cristo (Assembly of God Victory in Christ), a ministry of the Assemblies of God founded in 1959 in Rio de Janeiro, of which Michelle was an active member until 2016.

In 2010, Michelle gave birth to Laura. Her desire to become a mother again led Jair Bolsonaro to have his vasectomy reversed at the Army's central hospital. The family established residence in a gated community house in Barra da Tijuca.

Currently, Michelle is part of the Deaf Ministry of the Atitude Baptist Church in Barra da Tijuca, where she works as a Libras interpreter during services.

== Honors ==
=== Decorations ===
Insignia	Country	Honor	Date
	Brazil	Grand Officer of the Order of Defence Merit, conferred by President Jair Bolsonaro	10 June 2021
	Bahrain	First class of the Order of Sheikh Isa bin Salman Al Khalifa, decorated by King Hamad bin Isa Al Khalifa	16 November 2021
	Brazil	Grand Officer of the Order of Judicial Merit of Labor, awarded by the Superior Labor Court	1 December 2021
	Brazil	Grand Cross of the Order of Rio Branco, decorated by President Jair Bolsonaro	9 December 2021

=== Honorary Titles ===
- Honorary Citizen of Fortaleza, on 16 April 2019.
- Medalha Tiradentes, on 17 April 2019.
- Medal of Merit Oswaldo Cruz, on 5 August 2021.
- Medal of Legislative Merit, on 7 December 2022.

== Controversies ==
=== COAF and Queiroz case ===
In December 2018, a report from the Council for Financial Activities Control (COAF) pointed to suspicious financial transactions in an account under the name of Fabrício José Carlos de Queiroz, a former parliamentary aide to Flávio Bolsonaro. One of the bank transactions carried out in Queiroz's account and mentioned in the COAF report refers to a check for 24 thousand reais intended for Michelle Bolsonaro. Taking to the website O Antagonista, President Jair Bolsonaro said that Fabrício Queiroz owed him 40 thousand reais, an amount paid through ten checks of 4 thousand reais deposited into Michelle's account. However, in August 2020, almost two months after the former parliamentary aide's arrest, Crusoé Magazine reported a breach of secrecy of Queiroz's bank account, authorized by the courts, revealing that he and his wife Márcia Aguiar deposited approximately 21 checks into Michelle Bolsonaro's account between 2011 and 2016, totaling 89,000 reais.

Because of this, Michelle Bolsonaro was satirized by the band Detonautas Roque Clube with a song titled Micheque (a portmanteau of Michelle and cheque). Michelle Bolsonaro's advisors stated they intend to sue the band for insult, slander, and defamation, and urged Bolsonaro's husband to resolve the situation. Michelle Bolsonaro went to the State Department of Criminal Investigations of the Civil Police of São Paulo State to file a complaint and request that the song be removed from digital platforms and banned from being played. When asked about the lawsuit, the band's lead singer, Tico Santa Cruz, stated, "She has to demand answers from Bolsonaro".

=== Federal Revenue Data ===
On 5 April 2019, the Federal Revenue Service notified the Federal Police of "unjustified" access by two of its employees to the tax information of Jair and Michelle Bolsonaro, considered confidential data. While under police investigation, the two employees undergo disciplinary proceedings. One of them, Odilon Ayub Alves, brother of congresswoman Norma Ayub (DEM), told police the access was a "joke" and denied leaking the information.

=== Religious Intolerance ===
In August 2022, in a post on her Instagram account, she was accused of religious intolerance. She shared on the social media, in a story on her account, a video originally posted by councilwoman Sonaira Fernandes (Republicans), showing former president Luiz Inácio Lula da Silva (PT) receiving a popcorn bath given by representatives of a Candomblé terreiro in the city of Salvador. The ritual symbolizes spiritual protection for faiths like Umbanda and Candomblé. While sharing the video, Bolsonaro wrote, "this is allowed, right! Me talking about God is not."

The post generated reactions in Brazil. Ivanir dos Santos, spokesperson for the Commission to Combat Religious Intolerance of the Order of Attorneys of Brazil (OAB) in Rio de Janeiro, condemned Bolsonaro's Instagram story in an interview with the newspaper Extra and stated that "Michelle [Bolsonaro] uses a racist concept that what is white and European is good and should be exalted. While what comes from Africa, from black people, is evil. It's ignorance because in African traditions there is the figure of the creator. This God of hers originates from our continent." The Dom Paulo Evaristo Arns Interfaith Front for Justice and Peace also commented on the matter, stating they feel "concern" about posts of this nature and said in a note: "in the name of respect for faith, we ask that the first lady immediately retract, within the Christian principles of love for neighbor she claims to profess, and act in accordance with the laws that govern our country, so that it may truly be a homeland for all Brazilians, irrespective of religious or political choice."

There were also reactions in the political sphere, such as from parties like the Socialism and Liberty Party (PSOL) and São Paulo state deputy, Leci Brandão (PCdoB), who condemned the first lady's attitude.

=== Saudi jewellery case ===
In 2023, Brazilian federal police investigated allegations that former president Jair Bolsonaro attempted to improperly import and retain luxury jewellery given by Saudi Arabia in 2019. The items were reportedly intended for him and his wife. The jewellery was seized by Brazilian customs officials in 2021 after a member of Bolsonaro’s entourage attempted to bring the items into the country without declaring them. According to police reports, the collection included Rolex and Patek Philippe watches and diamond pieces from Chopard. Some of the jewellery was later returned by Bolsonaro’s team after the case became public. Bolsonaro has been removed from concern over the Saudi jewelry scandal.

== See also ==
- List of first ladies of Brazil

== Notes ==
Honorary titles
Preceded by Marcela Temer	First Lady of Brazil; 2019–2023	Succeeded by Rosângela Lula da Silva
