= Crateús Airport =

Dr. Lúcio Lima Regional Airport Aeroporto Regional Dr. Lúcio Lima
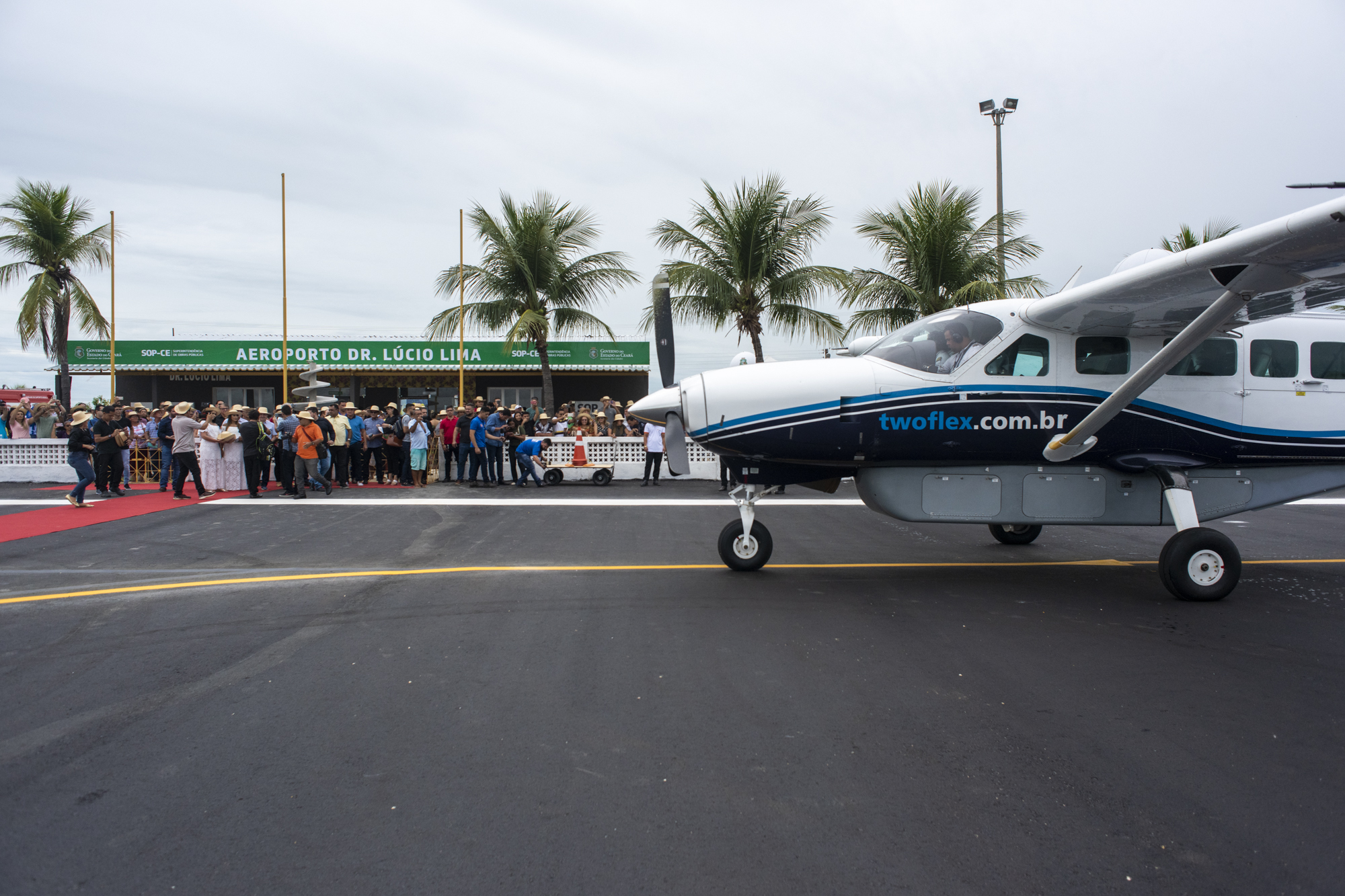
- Inaugural Twoflex flight in 2020
- IATA: JCS; ICAO: SNWS; LID: CE0005

Summary
- Airport type: Public
- Operator: Infraero (2023–2025); Visac Aeroportos (2025-present)
- Serves: Crateús
- Time zone: BRT (UTC−03:00)
- Elevation AMSL: 318 m (1,043 ft)
- Coordinates: 05°12′40″S 040°42′15″W
- Website: www4.infraero.gov.br/aeroporto-crateus/

Map
- Location in Brazil

Runways
Direction	Length		Surface
Direction	m	ft	Surface
08/26	1,500	4,921	Asphalt

Statistics (2024)
- Passengers: 1,917
- Aircraft Operations: 848
- Metric tonnes of cargo: 5
- Statistics: Infraero; Sources: Airport Website, ANAC, DECEA

Dr. Lúcio Lima Regional Airport (IATA: JCS, ICAO: SNWS), is the airport serving Crateús, Brazil.

It is managed by contract by Visac Aeroportos.

== History ==
Previously operated by Infraero, on April 22, 2025 the State of Ceará signed a one-year contract of operation with Visac Aeroportos.

== Access ==
The airport is located 6 km (4 mi) from downtown Crateús.

== See also ==
- List of airports in Brazil
