= Buriti dos Montes =

- Municipality
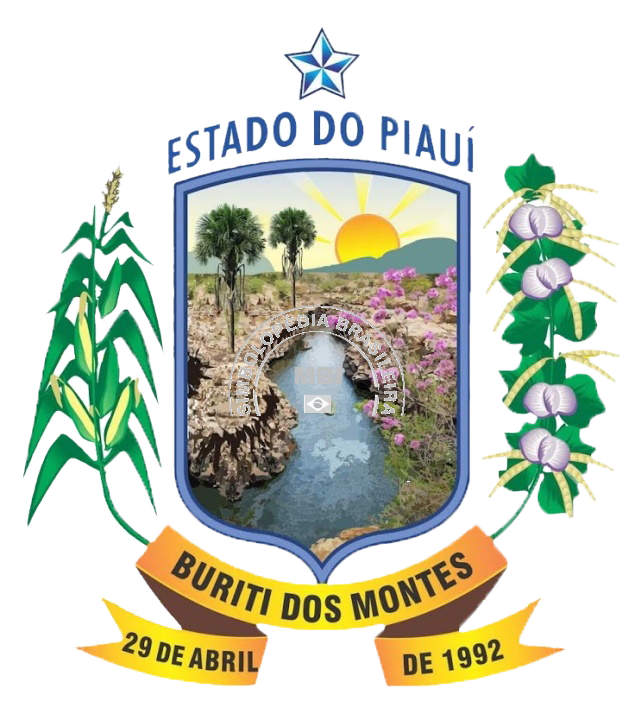
- Coat of arms

- Location in Brazil
- Coordinates: 5.312°S 41.096°W
- Country: Brazil
- Region: Nordeste
- State: Piauí
- Mesoregion: Centro-Norte Piauiense

Population (2020)
  - Total: 8,264
- Time zone: UTC−3 (BRT)

Buriti dos Montes is a municipality in the state of Piauí in the Northeast region of Brazil.

The municipality contains part of the 6,137 hectares (15,160 acres) Serra das Almas Private Natural Heritage Reserve, which preserves an area of the Caatinga biome. The municipality contains part of the 1,592,550 hectares (3,935,300 acres) Serra da Ibiapaba Environmental Protection Area, created in 1996.

== See also ==
- List of municipalities in Piauí
