= Inauguration of Jair Bolsonaro =

2019 presidential inauguration in Brazil

Presidential inauguration of Jair Bolsonaro
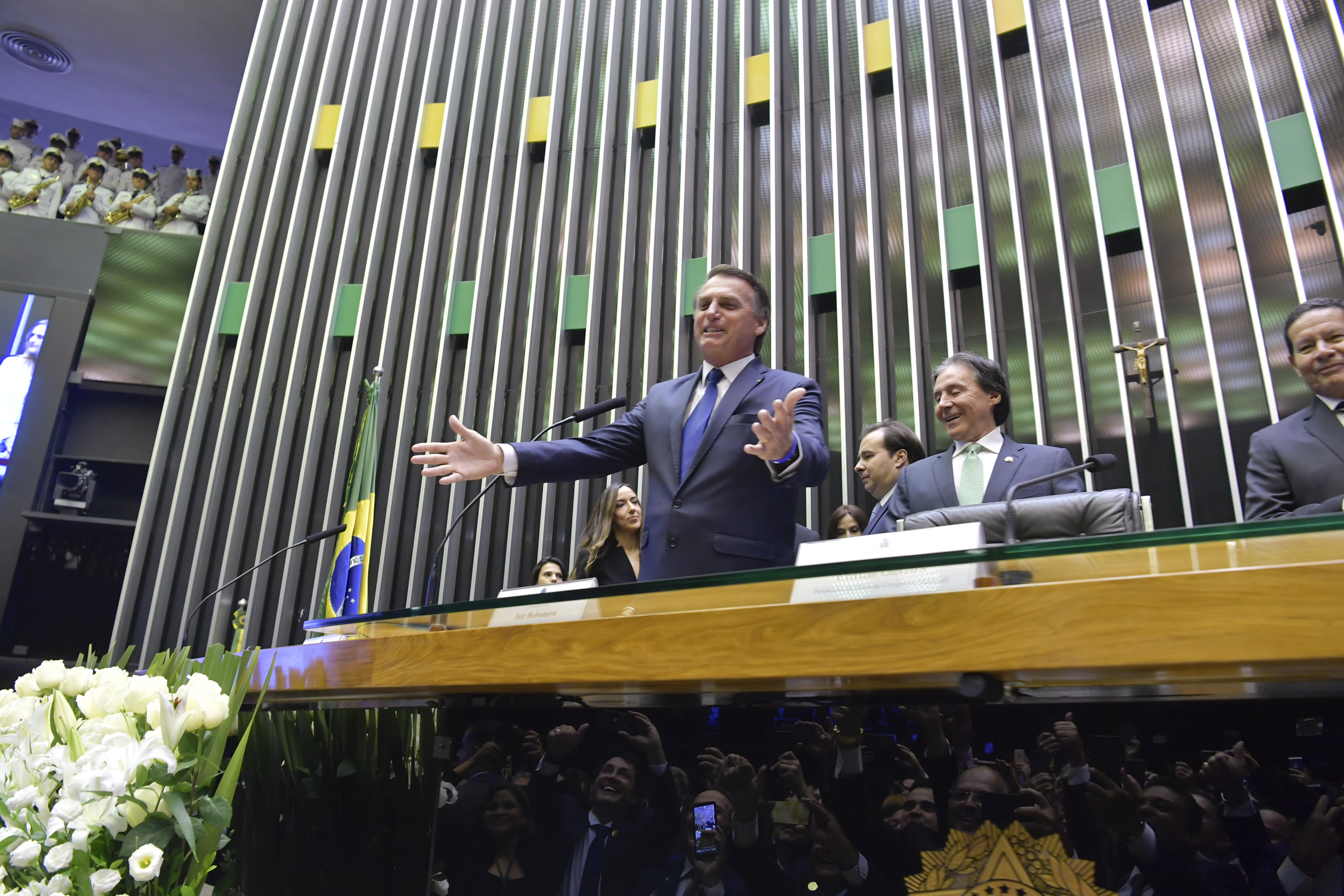
- Jair Bolsonaro during the ceremony of Constitutional Commitment in the National Congress
- Date: 1 January 2019; 7 years ago
- Time: 3:00 pm (BRST)
- Location: National Congress of Brazil Brasília, DF
- Participants: Jair Bolsonaro president of Brazil — Assuming office Hamilton Mourão vice president of Brazil — Assuming office Eunício Oliveira president of the Federal Senate — Administering oath

Jair Bolsonaro and Hamilton Mourão were inaugurated as president of Brazil and vice president, respectively, on 1 January 2019, in a ceremony held in the National Congress of Brazil in Brasília, beginning the presidency of Jair Bolsonaro.

== Planning ==
Bolsonaro inauguration had the highest number of security agents in history, with around 46 federal police officers securing the president. Laser-guided anti-aircraft missiles were also part of the security structure. The air space was closed in a 7 kilometres (4.3 mi) radius. 20 Air Force fighters were placed in strategic places.

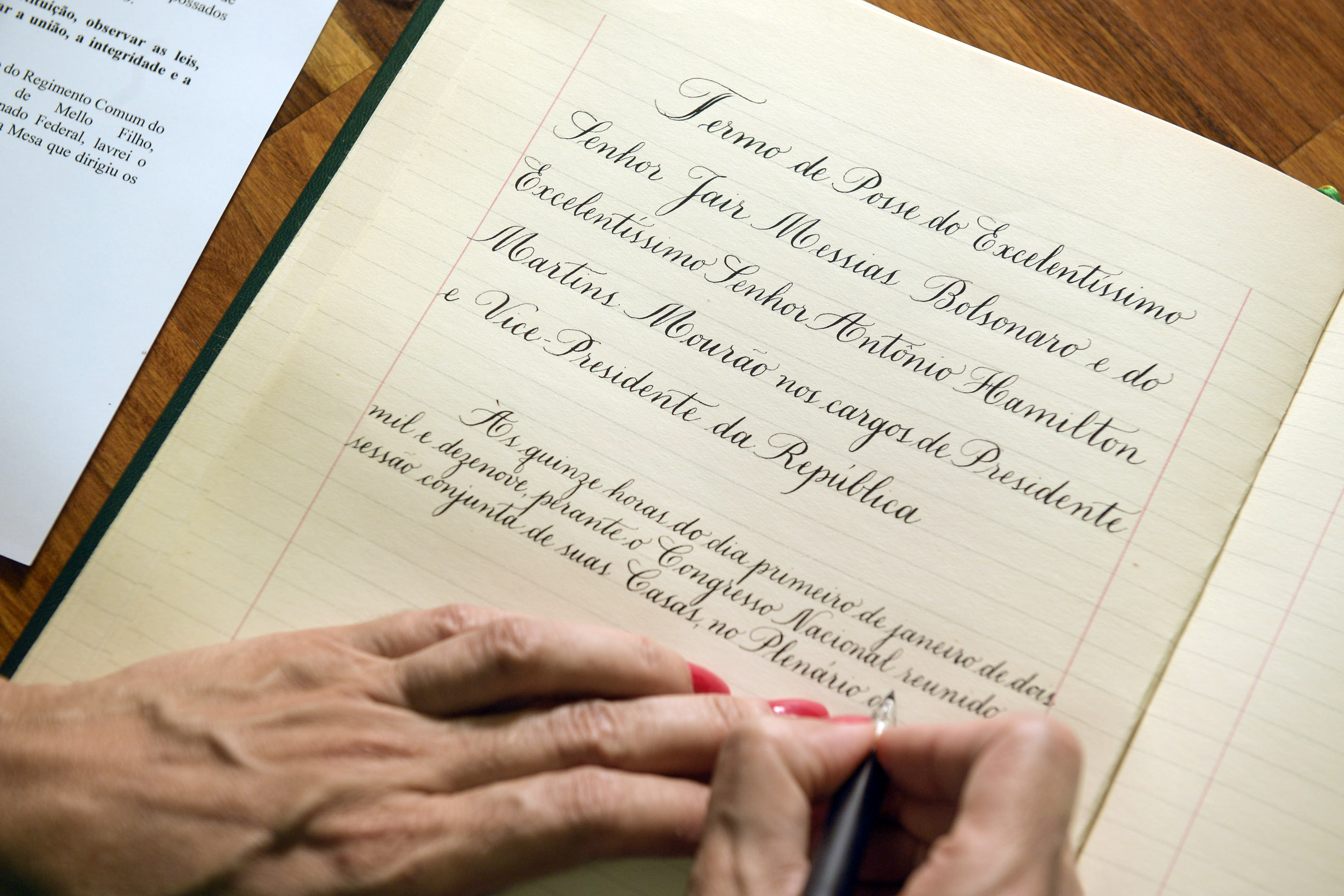
Confection of the investiture instrument in the Presidential Inauguration Book, that was signed by Bolsonaro and Mourão

6,000 agents secured the inauguration: Federal Police, Military Police, National Force, presidential guard. The Brazilian Air Force (FAB) used 20 Northrop F-5 and Embraer EMB 314 Super Tucano aircraft to oversight and protect the air space inside a 130 kilometres (81 mi) radius of the National Congress, besides the use of two laser guided missiles. President Michel Temer signed a decree on 28 December 2018 authorizing the Air Force to shoot down any suspect aircraft or which doesn't respect the recommendations of the air traffic control in all national territory, including unmanned aerial vehicles.

Different from previous inaugurations, journalists had no free access to the ceremonies locations, being placed only in specific places defined by the event organization. At the Monumental Axis, the vehicle transit was prohibited on 29 December and the pedestrian traffic at the afternoon of 31 December. The Federal District Secretariat of Public Security published a list of object that were not allowed in the ceremony at the Axis, prohibiting the entrance of alcoholic beverages, bottles, umbrellas, fireworks, laser points, animals, bags and purses, sprays, masks, flammable objects, guns, sharp objects, drones and strollers.

== Schedule ==
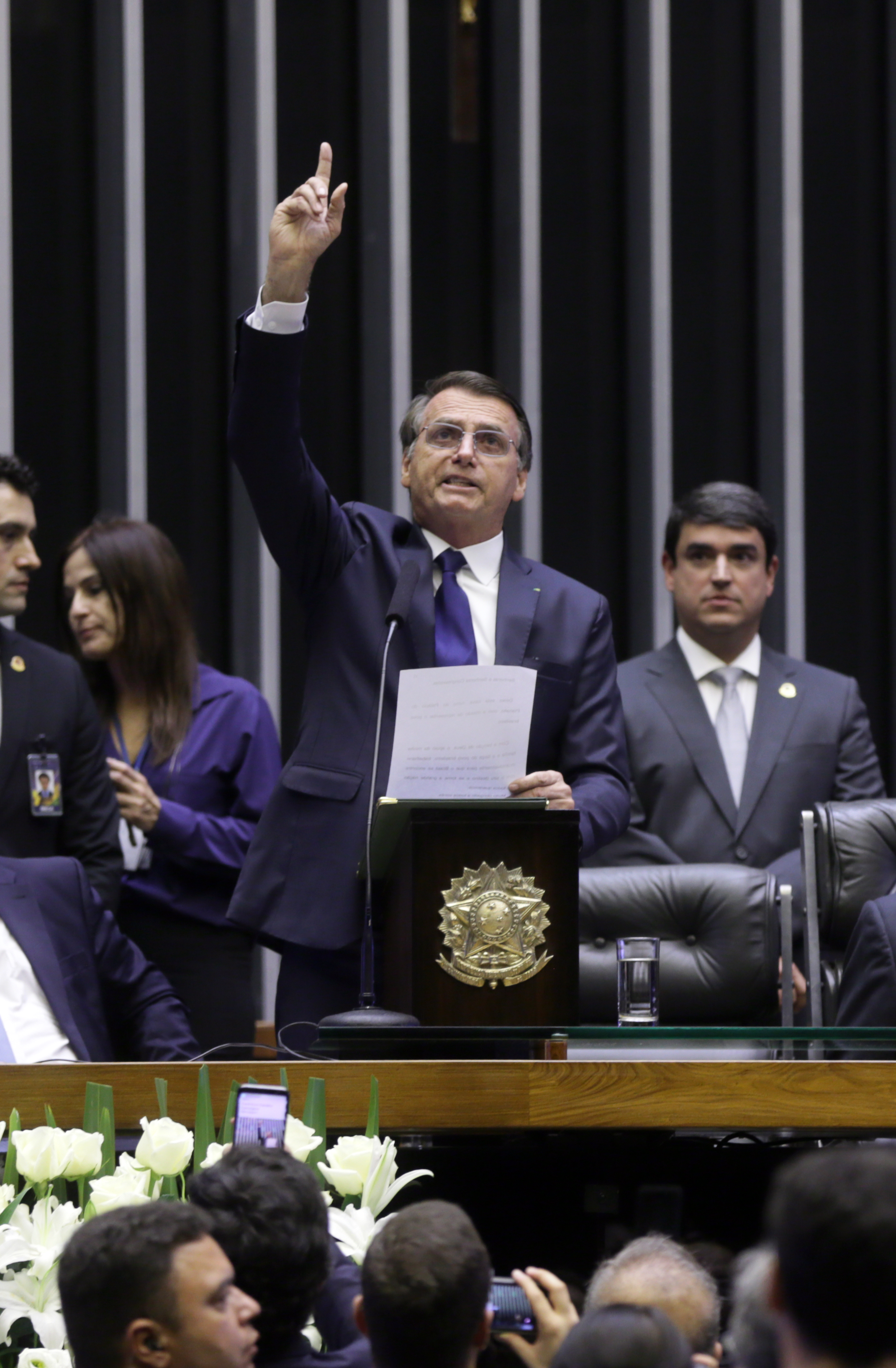
Bolsonaro making his speech before the Congress

The inauguration ceremony began at 2:30 pm (BRST), when Bolsonaro and his wife, Michelle Bolsonaro, left the Granja do Torto towards the Cathedral of Brasília. After leaving the official residence, dozens of supporters awaited for him at the entrance, with Brazilian flags and green and yellow shirts. The convoy arrived at the Cathedral 10 minutes later. There, the couple met with Hamilton Mourão and his wife, Paula Mourão, and both couples headed to the National Congress.

During the parade, Bolsonaro and Michelle waved to the public. One of the president's sons, Carlos Bolsonaro, followed the couple in the traditional presidential Rolls-Royce Silver Wraith. Carlos is a city councillor of Rio de Janeiro and sat in the back of the vehicle. In the beginning of the parade, the official car had to reduce the speed because of the horses of the Independence Dragons shocked with another one and had to be controlled by his rider.

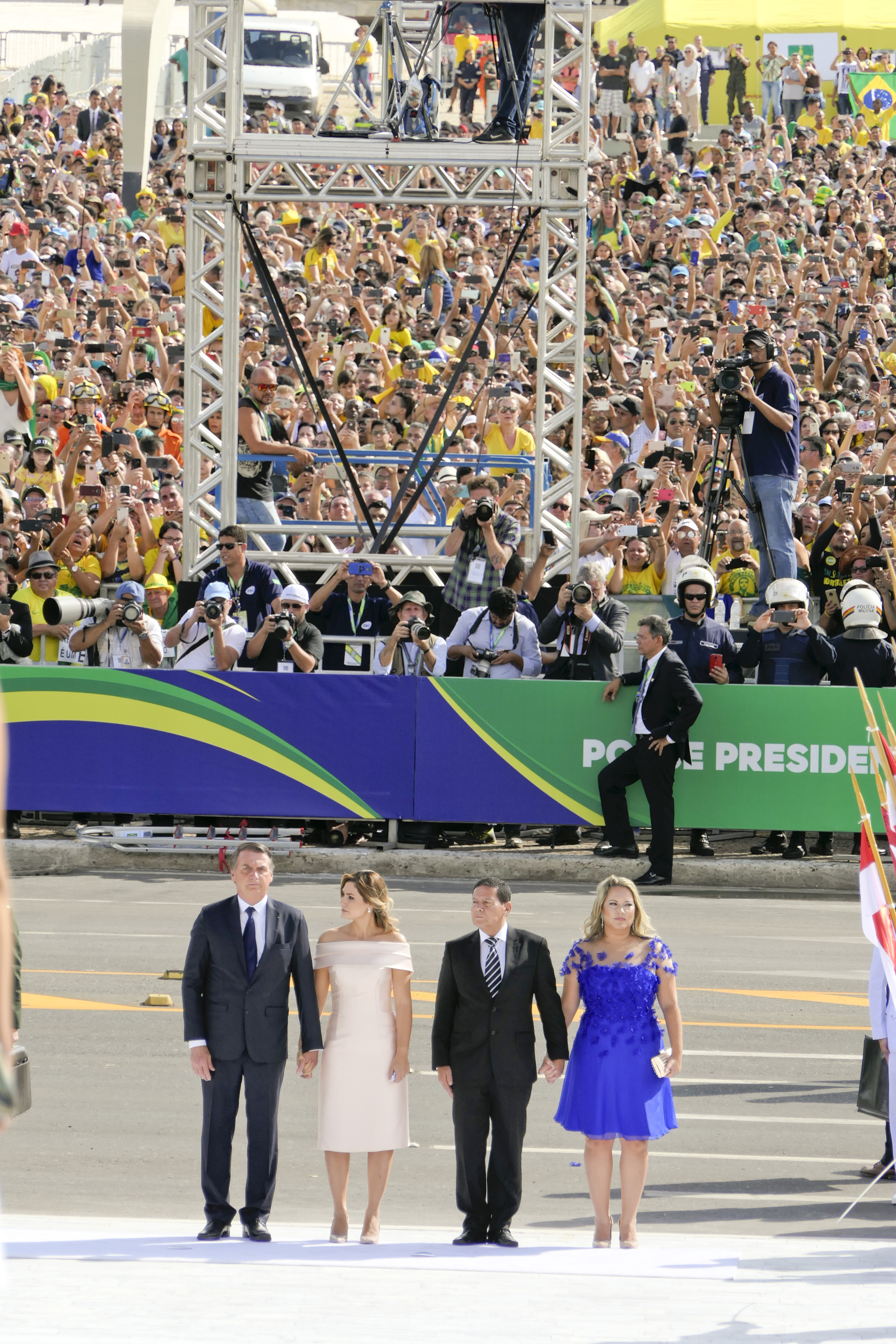
President Jair Bolsonaro and First Lady Michelle Bolsonaro beside Vice President Hamilton Mourão and Second Lady Paula Mourão, positioned to climb the ramp of the Planalto Palace

In the National Congress, at 3 pm, the joint session of Congress began, presided by the President of the Federal Senate Eunício Oliveira, inauguration Bolsonaro and Mourão, before federal deputies and senators of the 55th Legislature and other guests. After signing the investiture instrument, Bplsonaro gave his first speech as the new Brazilian head of State.

His first speech lasted about 10 minutes. At 4 pm, after leaving the National Congress, the National Anthem was played, a 21-gun salute from a 45mm Krupp gun was fired, reviewing the troops and being recognized as Commander-in-chief of the Brazilian Armed Forces.

After that, Bolsonaro headed towards the Planalto Palace where, at 4:30 pm, Michel Temer delivered the presidential sash to Bolsonaro. Temer didn't gave a speech and left the palace towards the Brasília Air Force Base. Before Bolsonaro gave his speech, the new First Lady, Michelle, gave an unexpected speech in Brazilian Sign Language.

With the presidential sash, Bolsonaro addressed the nation for the first time. During his speech, the public at the Three Powers Plaza called the president a "myth" and shouted "the captain is back". At this time, Bolsonaro appeared to be thrilled. After speaking at the parlatorium, president Bolsonaro went inside the Palace, where he greeted international leaders and guests. Among the presents were Mario Abdo Benítez (Paraguay), Tabaré Vázquez (Uruguay), Marcelo Rebelo de Sousa (Portugal), Sebastián Piñera (Chile) and Evo Morales (Bolivia).

One of the last steps of the ceremony was the swearing-in of the new Ministers of State, that took place at 5:30 pm. Bolsonaro swore in 21 ministers. To finish, at 6:30 pm, there was a reception offered by Bolsonaro and Michelle to all guests at Itamaraty Palace.

== Television broadcast ==
=== Brazilian broadcasters coverage ===
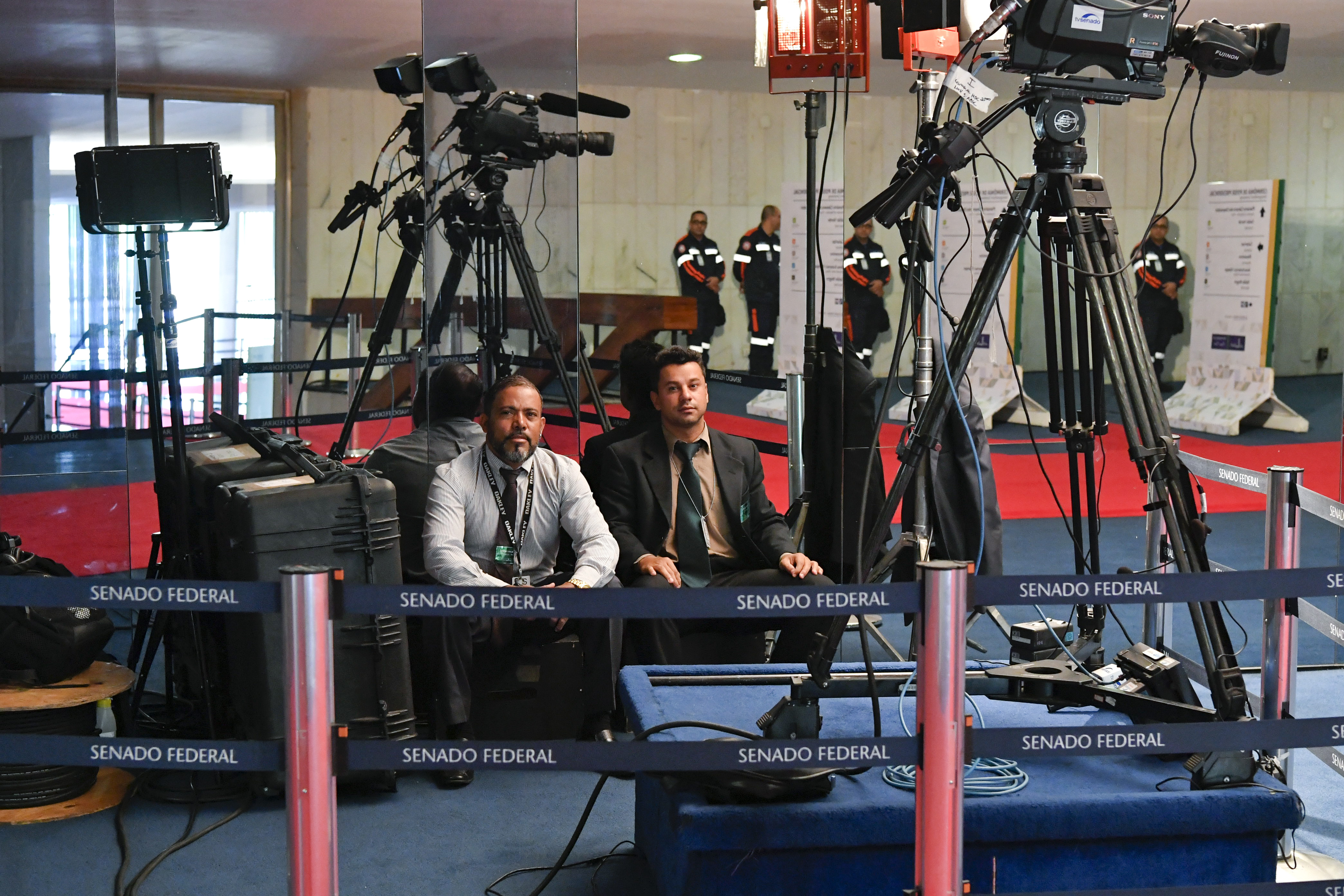
Space reserved for TV coverage during the inauguration solenity of Jair Bolsonaro and Hamilton Mourão

Traditionally, the television broadcast of the ceremonies was coordinated and made by Brazil Communication Company (EBC), and relayed by 11 channels, among them TV NBR, TV Globo, GloboNews, RecordTV, SBT, RedeTV!, Rede Bandeirantes and BandNews TV.

GloboNews made the largest coverage of the inauguration, airing about 18 hours, from 6 am of 1 January to 12 am of 2 January. From the country capital to the Brazilians households, Globo made a special and unprecedented scheme, with reports working in more than 20 locations live. There were 45 teams filming and a pool of 11 broadcasters. The coverage had more than 300 journalists and technicians of Globo, GloboNews and G1.

RecordTV mobilized 111 professionals during the inauguration of president Jair Bolsonaro. In Brasília, there 94 professionals for the broadcasting, other 13, among reporters, film reporters, were sent from São Paulo to the capital, besides other 4 professionals from Brasília. Besides the pool images, the broadcaster had 13 exclusive live broadcast equipments, with reporters positioned in all of the ceremony spots.

SBT made a live and uninterrupted coverage of the inauguration of the new president, hosted by journalist Carlos Nascimento, besides the involvement of about 50 professionals, among reporters, producers, filmmakers and technicians, also with exclusive cameras in the Cathedral of Brasília, the National Congress, the Planalto Palace and the Itamaraty Palace.

== Presence of world leaders ==
46 foreign delegations travelled to Brasília for the president inauguration. In the Planalto Palace, the President, the Vice President and the Minister of Foreign Affairs greeted the following:

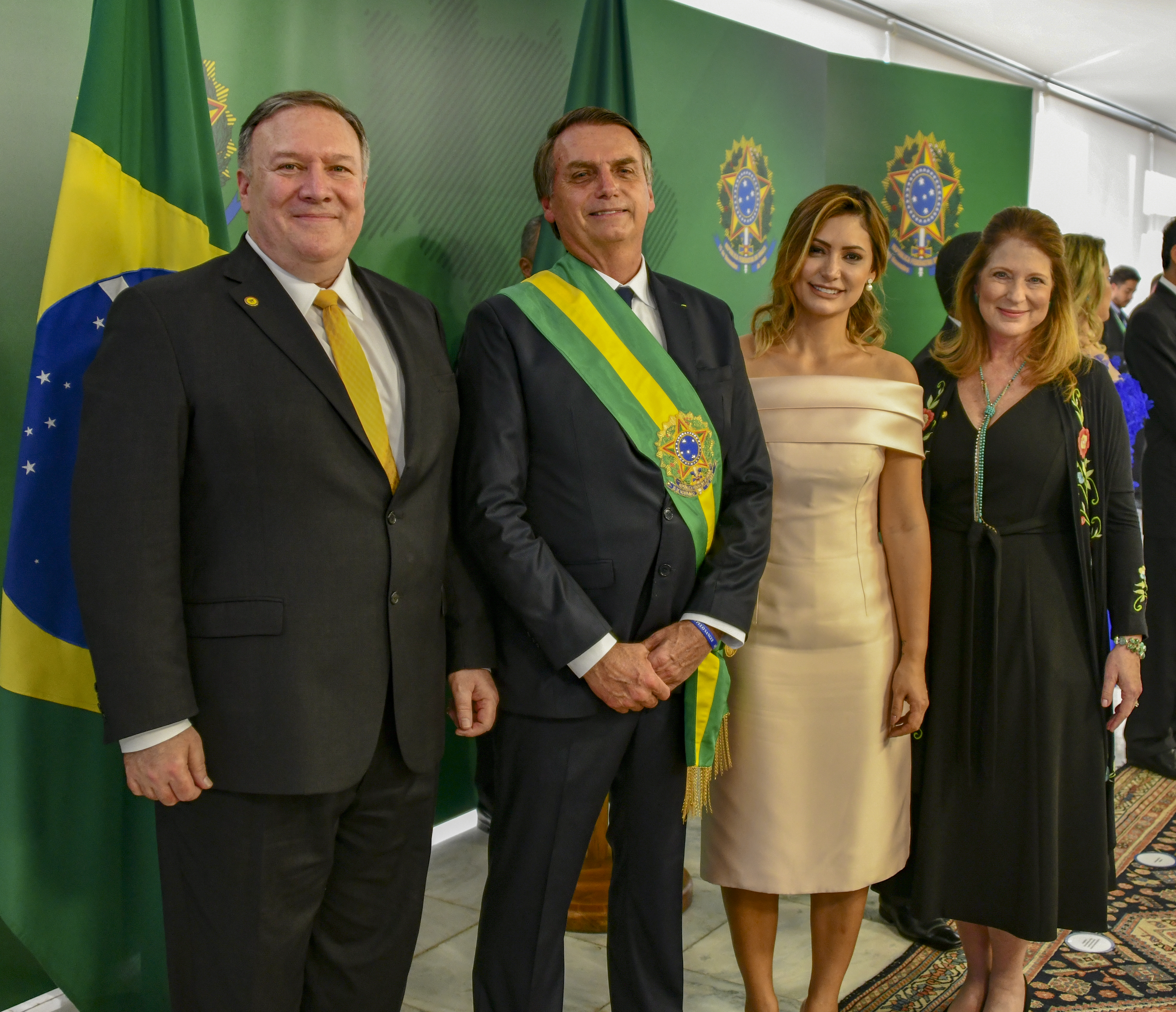
President Jair Bolsonaro and First Lady Michelle meet with U.S. Secretary of State Mike Pompeo and his wife

- Angola – Minister of Foreign Affairs Manuel Augusto
- Argentina – Minister of Foreign Affairs Jorge Faurie
- Bolivia – President Evo Morales
- Cape Verde – President Jorge Carlos Fonseca
- Chile – President Sebastián Piñera
- Colombia – Vice President Marta Lucía Ramírez
- Ecuador – Vice President Otto Sonnenholzner
- Guinea – Minister of Foreign Affairs Mamadi Touré
- Guyana – Minister of Foreign Affairs Carl B. Greenidge
- Holy See – Apostolic Nuncio Andrés Carrascosa Coso
- Honduras – President Juan Orlando Hernández
- Hungary – Prime Minister Viktor Orbán
- Israel – Prime Minister Benjamin Netanyahu
- Morocco – Prime Minister Saadeddine Othmani
- Paraguay – President Mario Abdo Benítez
- Peru – Minister of Foreign Affairs Néstor Popolizio
- Poland – Minister of Foreign Affairs Jacek Czaputowicz
- Portugal – President Marcelo Rebelo de Sousa
- Russia – Chairman of the State Duma Vyacheslav Volodin
- São Tomé and Príncipe – Minister of Foreign Affairs Elsa Maria Teixeira
- Spain – President of the Congress of Deputies Ana Pastor Julián
- Suriname – Vice President Ashwin Adhin
- Serbia – Deputy Prime Minister Ivica Dačić
- United States – Secretary of State Mike Pompeo
- Uruguay – President Tabaré Vázquez

International organizations

- Community of Portuguese Language Countries – Executive-Secretary Francisco Ribeiro Telles
- World Trade Organization – Director-General Roberto Azevêdo
- Amazon Cooperation Treaty Organization – Secretary-General Alexandra Moreira López

Representatives from Venezuela, Cuba and Nicaragua weren't invited to the ceremony, due to accusations of totalitarianism in their respective countries.

== Presence of former presidents ==
- José Sarney, 31st president of Brazil
- Fernando Collor de Mello, 32nd president of Brazil

== Criticism ==
=== Speech ===
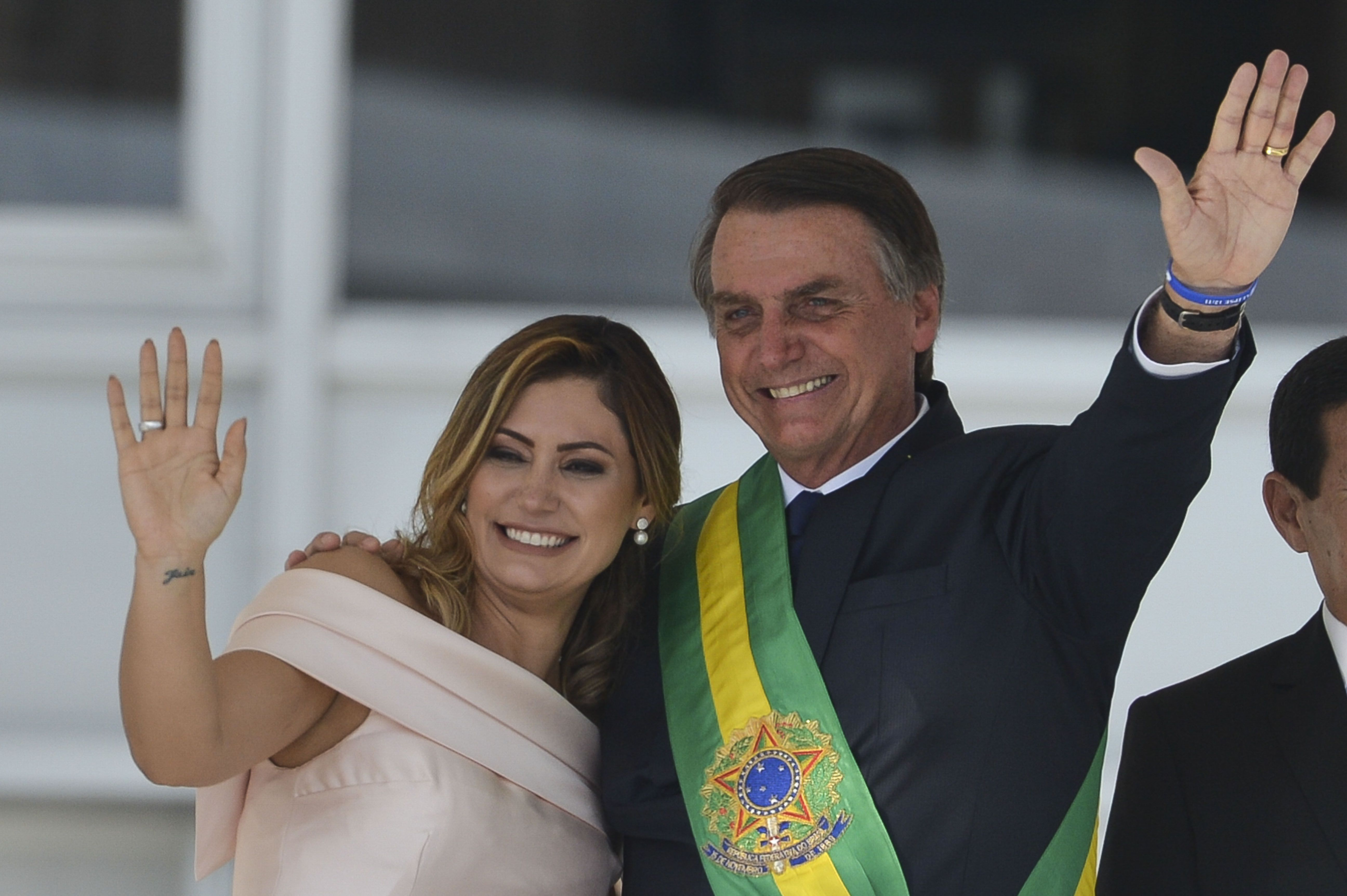
President Jair Bolsonaro and First Lady Michelle Bolsonaro during the parlatorium speech at the Planalto Palace

The second Bolsonaro speech, this time for his electors outside the Congress, gained repercussion around the world, specially his speech, hold a Brazilian flag, in favor of a "traditional family", against what he called the "political correctness" and "nocive ideologies" and that his inauguration would represent "the day that the people began to break free from socialism".

The largest and most famous international newspapers, such as French Le Monde and Le Figaro, British The Guardian, Italian Corriere della Sera, the American newspaper The New York Times and American broadcaster CBS News highlighted the moment and all of them called president Bolsonaro a "populist" and "far-rightist".

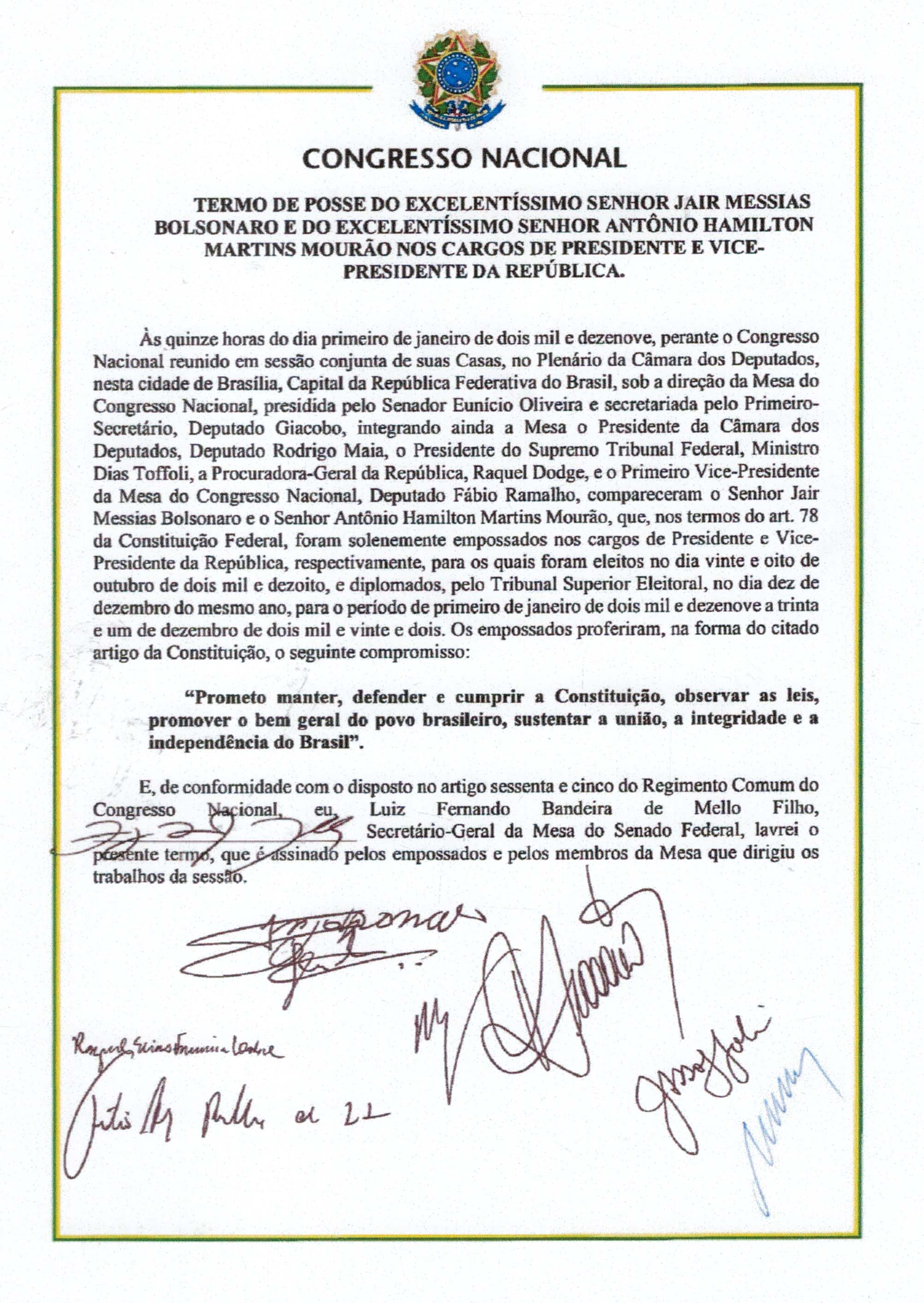
Brazilian Presidential and Vice Presidential investiture document. It has the signatures of the inaugurated and members of the National Congress Director Board

For CBS News, "Bolsonaro was the latest of several far-right leaders around the globe who have come to power by riding waves of anger and promising to ditch the status quo". Corriere della Sera criticized the "poor references" to economic programmes of the new government during Bolsonaro's speech, who, according to the newspaper, "repeatedly acknowledged understanding a thing" about it, delegating all of economic issues to his Minister of the Economy, Paulo Guedes.

According to Le Figaro, "Jair Bolsonaro took office on Tuesday, opening an age of ruptures with many uncertancies related to a far-right leaning of the largest power of the Latin America". Spanish newspaper El País, highlighting the promise to "free Brazil from corruption, criminality and ideological submission", emphasized the alliance of Bolsonaro with U.S. President Donald Trump.

The reference to socialism during the inauguration speech also gained repercusion nationally. In his social networks, professor, former Minister of Education and former Mayor of São Paulo Fernando Haddad, who went to the runoff in the 2018 election, ironized the president, regarding the minimum wage fixed on 2 January by him, affirming: "The people began to break free from socialism: expected minimum wage of R$ 1,006 was fixed in R$ 998. No pity. Wild!"

In an interview to the Brazilian version of El País on 7 January, politician Ciro Gomes, who placed third in the first round of the 2018 election, affirmed: "What's unsettling is that he said this in his inauguration speech, something that is projected for history. It was not supposed to be a "podium rapture", but what he does is a "podium rapture" that comes from the premise of the ignorance of the people. He supposes that the people is stupid, uncapable to know what socialism is. Affirming this, he conjures in the word "socialism" all of the conservative anger, that has two plans: conservative habits and economic conservatism. It is a tragedy, because it means that the comrade, after beginning his government, announces he will stay at the podium. He keeps saying superficial silly things and afirms himself in an 'antipetismo' also superficial".

=== Security scheme and press restrictions ===
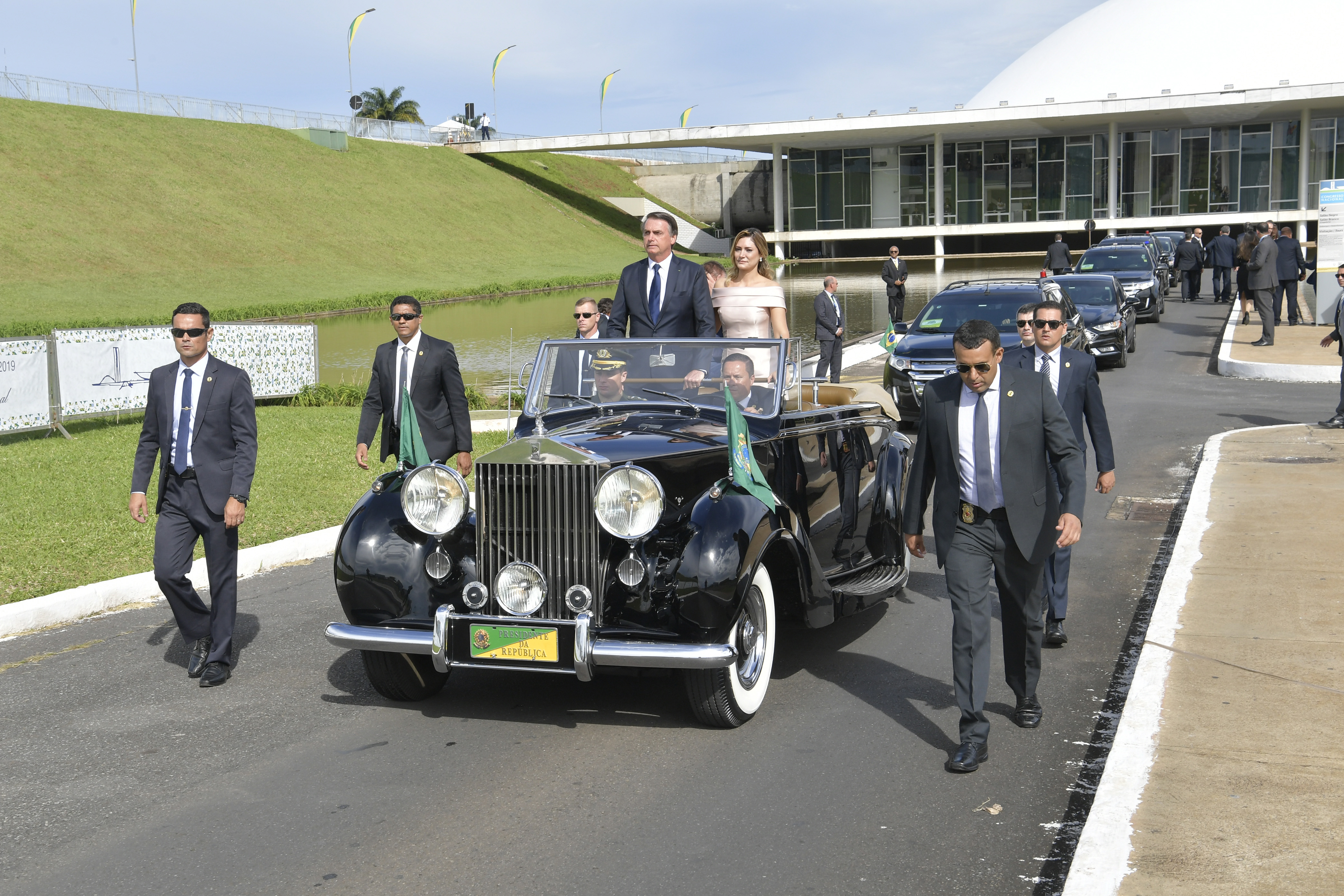
Jair Bolsonaro and Michelle during the parade in an open car between the Cathedral of Brasília and the National Congress

The Argentinian newspaper Clarín criticized the strong security scheme made for the ceremony, calling it "uncommon". Restrictions to the press work during the inauguration were published and criticized by journalists from many sources, national and international, and from organizations such as the Brazilian Association of Investigative Journalism (Abraji). Professionals affirmed they had no access to water or restrooms, that they were confined for around 7 hours, since their arrival until the beginning of the event, with no freedom of movement, and were unable to interview authorities during the coverage. The distribution of the traditional coffee was vetoed and chairs were removed, obliging the professionals to work sitting on the ground, and their snacks had to be placed in transparent bags and apples should be cut up, to avoid being thrown and cause an injury to the president-elect. Besides that, the new government advisors vetoed movement that could be identified as "sudden" from photographers that raise their cameras, as it could lead a sniper to shoot down the "target".

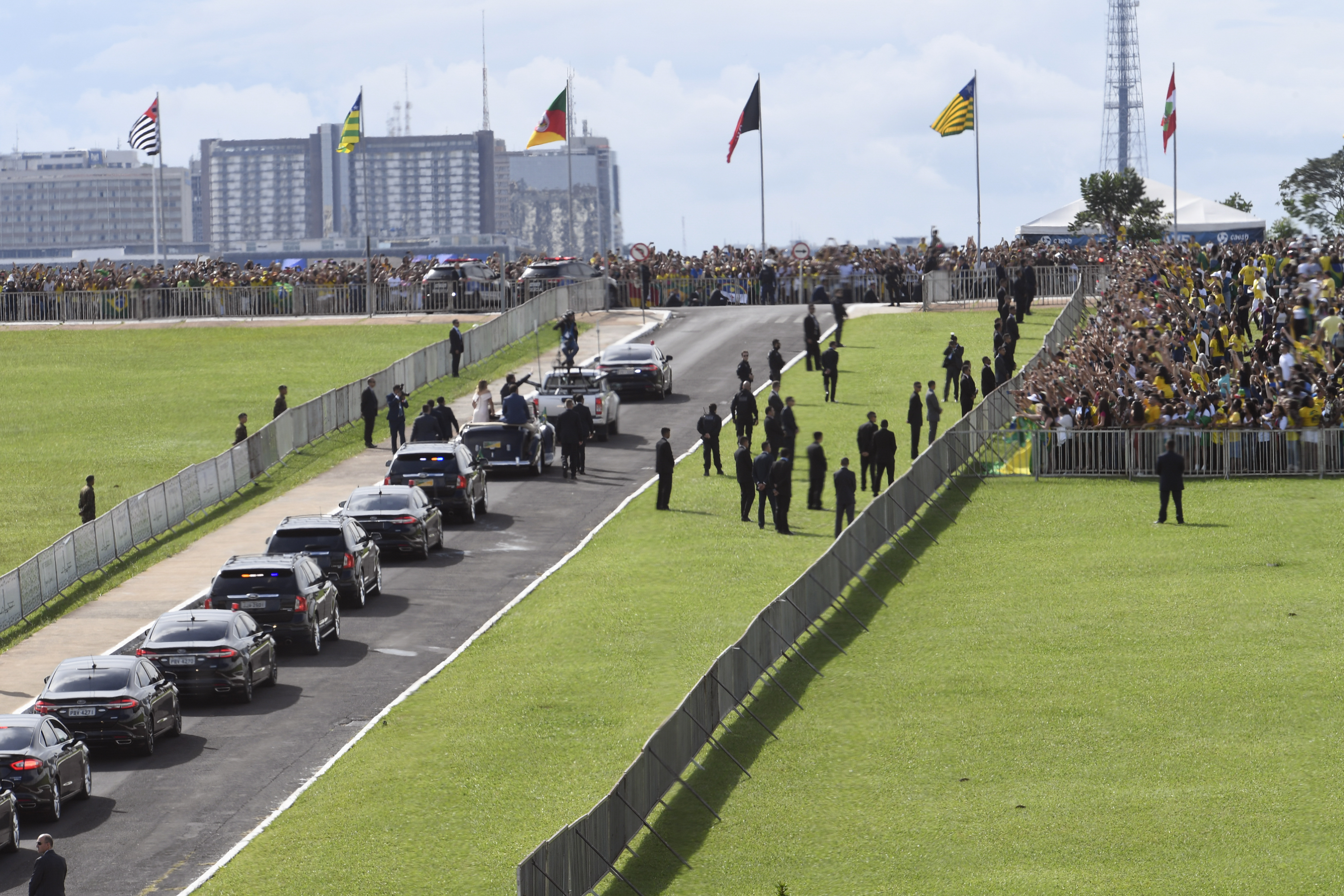
Security barricades used during the inauguration

Journalist and author Miriam Leitão, in her column in the newspaper O Globo, affirmed that covering inaugurations since general João Figueiredo, the last president of the military dictatorship, "there nothing so restrict". According to her, "it is clear that the security of president-elect, Jair Bolsonaro, and from the heads of State who are among us, need rule enforcement, but what is happening to journalists is unthinkable and unacceptable".

Under the title "A dog day" in her column in the newspaper Folha de S. Paulo, journalist Mônica Bergamo described the event as "something never seen since the redemocratization of the country, in which the opening of a new elect government was always a festivity closely watched, and with almost full freedom of movement by the press workers".

In a statement published on Twitter, Abraji affirmed that "a government that restricts the press works ignores the constitutional obligation of transparency. The Brazilians will get less information regarding the presidential inauguration due to limitations imposed to the journalists movement in Brasília". "The Abraji protests against this anti-democratic treatment given to the professionals that are there to broadcast to the public the historical recordings of this moment", concluded the entity in the statement.

Foreign correspondents also got angry and professionals from China and France abandoned the inauguration coverage, complaining about the treatment given to journalists, mainly about the fact that they were placed in a room with no windows in the underground of the Itamaraty press are with one television, not possible to freely circulate and film the population. Some reporters called the situation a "false imprisonment".

== See also ==
- Jair Bolsonaro 2018 presidential campaign
- Inauguration of Michel Temer
- Second inauguration of Dilma Rousseff
