= Serra das Almas Private Natural Heritage Reserve =

- RPPN Reserva Natural Serra das Almas
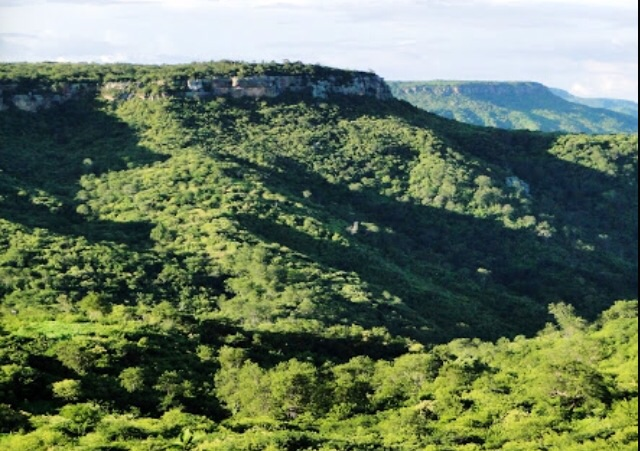
- Serra dos Tucuns

- Location within Brazil
- Nearest city: Crateús, Ceará
- Coordinates: 5°08′24″S 40°54′14″W
- Area: 6,137 hectares (15,160 acres)
- Designation: Private natural heritage reserve
- Created: 8 September 2000

Serra das Almas Private Natural Heritage Reserve (Portuguese: RPPN Reserva Natural Serra das Almas) is a private natural heritage reserve in the states of Ceará and Piauí, Brazil.

== Origins ==
The reserve has its origins in a trip made by Herbert Fisk Johnson Jr. of S. C. Johnson & Son in September 1935. He flew from Milwaukee, Wisconsin, to Fortaleza, Ceará, in an amphibious twin-engine Sikorsky S-38. His aim was to learn more about the carnauba palm tree (Copernicia prunifera) of north eastern Brazil which produced wax, one of the main products of his company, and to determine whether groves of these trees could produce enough to meet future demand. By 1937 the company had a carnauba processing factory in Fortaleza, and in 1938 had a research farm, later donated to the school of agronomy of the University of Ceara. In 1960 the company created a Brazilian subsidiary in 1960, and in 1990 launched the environmental project that led to creation of the Serra das Almas Natural Reserve.

== Location ==
The reserve was created on 8 September 2000 with an area of 4,749.58 hectares (11,736.5 acres) of the municipality of Crateús in the state of Ceará. Almost half of the reserve's original Caatinga vegetation had been devastated. It is the property of the Caatinga Association (Associação Caatinga (Note: The Associação Caatinga was established in Fortaleza in October 1998 with the support of the Caatinga Conservation Fund established by Samuel Johnson to protect the carnaúba. It is a non-profit non-governmental organization.)). The reserve was gradually expanded through acquisition of adjacent lands. In November 2015 the reserve reached 6,137 hectares (15,160 acres) through the purchase of the Fazenda Gameleira, with 292 hectares (720 acres) of preserved Caatinga. The reserve now covers parts of the municipalities of Crateús, Ceará and Buriti dos Montes, Piauí.

== Conservation ==
The reserve is supported by the Samuel Johnson Fund for Conservation of the Caatinga and the S. C. Johnson company. Through the Caatinga Association it has also received support from partners such as The Nature Conservancy, Petrobras, Fundação O Boticário, Fundo Nacional do Meio Ambiente and FUNBIO. The November 2015 purchase was achieved through the support of the International Union for Conservation of Nature (IUCN). The expansion, with monitoring, will help protect the reserve against indiscriminate hunting and fires. The reserve planned to expand biodiversity monitoring, surveillance and scientific research, and also to expand environmental education and ecotourism.

The main threat is illegal hunting of the rich fauna of the reserve. The deer, peccary, armadillo, agouti and rock cavy are under constant threat from hunters. The Saffron finch is much sought after by live bird traffickers. Other birds on the endangered list are the Blue-fronted amazon and the guan.

== Sources ==
- Alex Pimentel (11 November 2015), "Serra das Almas é maior RPPN do CE", Diário do Nordeste (in Portuguese)
- Marilia Marreco Cerqueira (8 September 2000), Portaria No 51, de 8 de Setembro de 2000 (PDF) (in Portuguese)
- Quem Somos (in Portuguese), Associação Caatinga
- Rodrigo Castro, Reserva Natural Serra das Almas / CE (in Portuguese), Associação Caatinga, archived from the original on 2016-06-11
- Shirley Noely Hauff; Rodrigo Castro (2007), Reserva Natural Serra das Almas (PDF) (in Portuguese), Brasília: The Nature Conservancy, Associação Caatinga
