= Marco Ubiali =

Brazilian congressman, doctor, and teacher (born 1949)

Marco Aurélio Ubiali
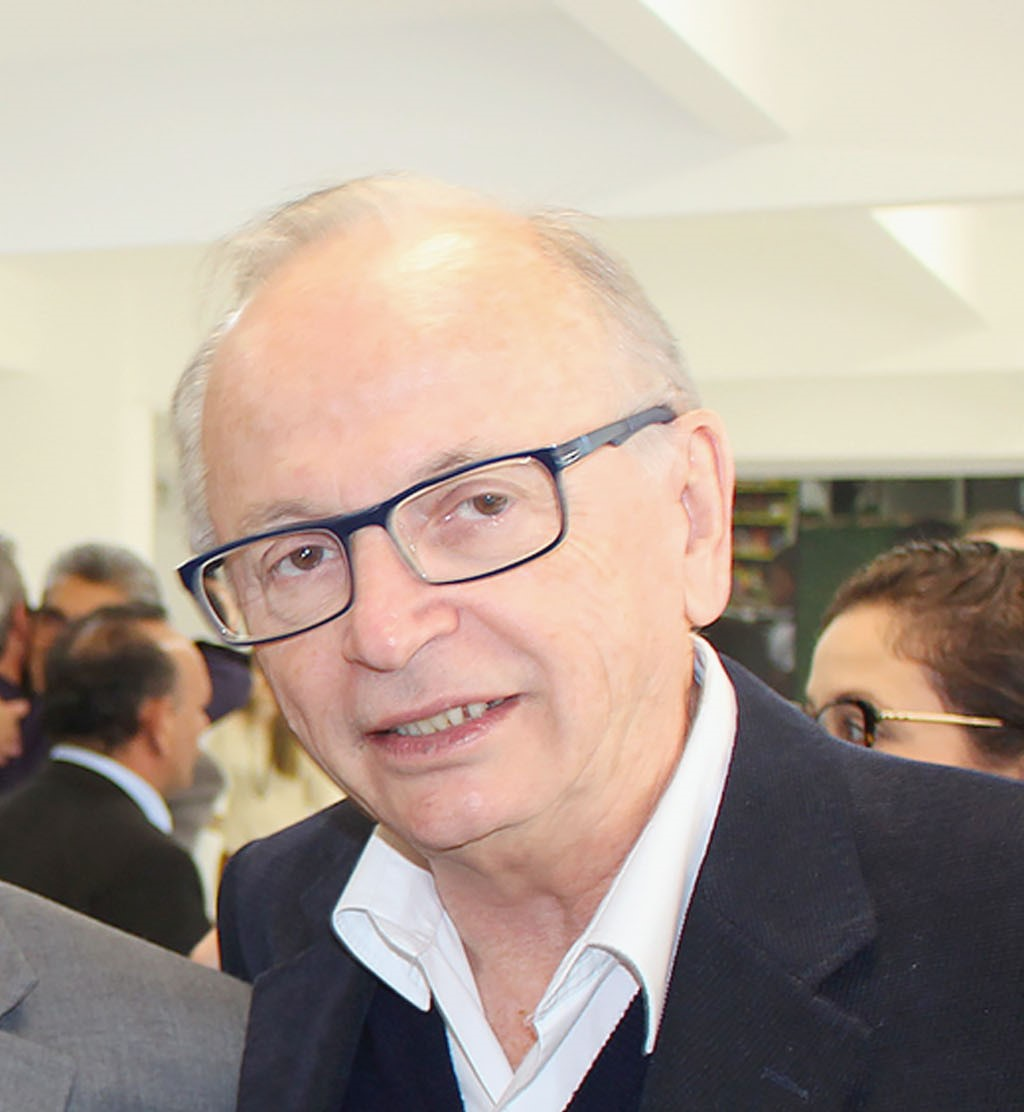
- In office January 2007 – January 2015

Personal details
- Born: November 7, 1949 (age 76) Franca, São Paulo, Brazil
- Party: PSB
- Occupation: Doctor

Marco Aurélio Ubiali (Franca, born November 7, 1949) is a doctor, teacher and Brazilian congressman.

He is a doctor who graduated from the Federal University of Minas Gerais and a federal deputy for the PSB of São Paulo and president of the Federation of APAEs of the State of São Paulo.
