= Crateús =

Municipality in Ceará, Brazil

- Regional Capital
- Crateús City
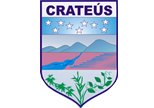
- Flag Coat of arms
- Etymology: Kariri: kará (fish) te (land) and ús (sun)
- Location within Brazil
- Coordinates: 5.177°S 40.668°W
- Country: Brazil
- State: Ceará
- Founder: Mrs. Ávila Pereira

Population (2020)
  - Total: 75,159
- Time zone: UTC−3 (BRT)

Crateús is a Brazilian city in the northwest of the state of Ceará in Northeastern Brazil with an estimated 75,159 inhabitants, and one of the most important and oldest cities in the county. Popularly known as the Capital of the West, it is a city with significant regional importance, standing out in the traditional function of marketing rural products, resulting from the development of family agriculture, with emphasis on the large production of corn and beans, at the foot of the rich valleys in the region, geographically cut by the Poti River and Serra Grande. It was once one of the largest biofuel producers in the Northeast, with a production capacity of 118,800 m^{3} (4,200,000 cu ft) of biodiesel per year according to the company. Crateús also hosts a Brazilian Army unit. It is located in a wealthy part of the state, close to the western border. Crateús is the seat of the Roman Catholic Diocese of Crateús. It was established by Portuguese explorers in the 17th century in uplands originally inhabited by indigenous peoples.

The municipality contains part of the 6,137 hectares (15,160 acres) Serra das Almas Private Natural Heritage Reserve, which preserves an area of the Caatinga biome.

The city is served by Dr. Lúcio Lima Airport.

== Climate ==
Climate data for Crateús (1981–2010)
Month	Jan	Feb	Mar	Apr	May	Jun	Jul	Aug	Sep	Oct	Nov	Dec	Year
Mean daily maximum °C (°F)	33.6 (92.5)	32.8 (91.0)	32.0 (89.6)	31.1 (88.0)	31.7 (89.1)	32.3 (90.1)	33.1 (91.6)	34.2 (93.6)	35.5 (95.9)	36.0 (96.8)	35.7 (96.3)	35.1 (95.2)	33.6 (92.5)
Daily mean °C (°F)	27.6 (81.7)	26.7 (80.1)	26.1 (79.0)	25.6 (78.1)	25.8 (78.4)	25.8 (78.4)	26.5 (79.7)	27.4 (81.3)	28.8 (83.8)	29.5 (85.1)	29.6 (85.3)	29.0 (84.2)	27.4 (81.3)
Mean daily minimum °C (°F)	23.2 (73.8)	22.6 (72.7)	22.5 (72.5)	22.2 (72.0)	21.7 (71.1)	20.6 (69.1)	20.7 (69.3)	21.5 (70.7)	22.8 (73.0)	23.4 (74.1)	23.7 (74.7)	23.7 (74.7)	22.4 (72.3)
Average precipitation mm (inches)	117.4 (4.62)	122.5 (4.82)	183.6 (7.23)	178.7 (7.04)	67.1 (2.64)	13.1 (0.52)	6.8 (0.27)	7.1 (0.28)	0.7 (0.03)	6.5 (0.26)	11.1 (0.44)	23.8 (0.94)	738.4 (29.07)
Average precipitation days (≥ 1.0 mm)	7	9	13	13	7	2	2	1	0	1	1	2	58
Average relative humidity (%)	62.9	70.8	76.7	81.1	73.8	64.5	54.7	47.8	43.1	42.4	44.4	51.8	59.5
Mean monthly sunshine hours	183.3	180.3	174.6	159.2	201.3	219.6	252.2	280.3	276.8	275.9	242.8	218.5	2,664.8
Source: Instituto Nacional de Meteorologia

== Prestes Column ==
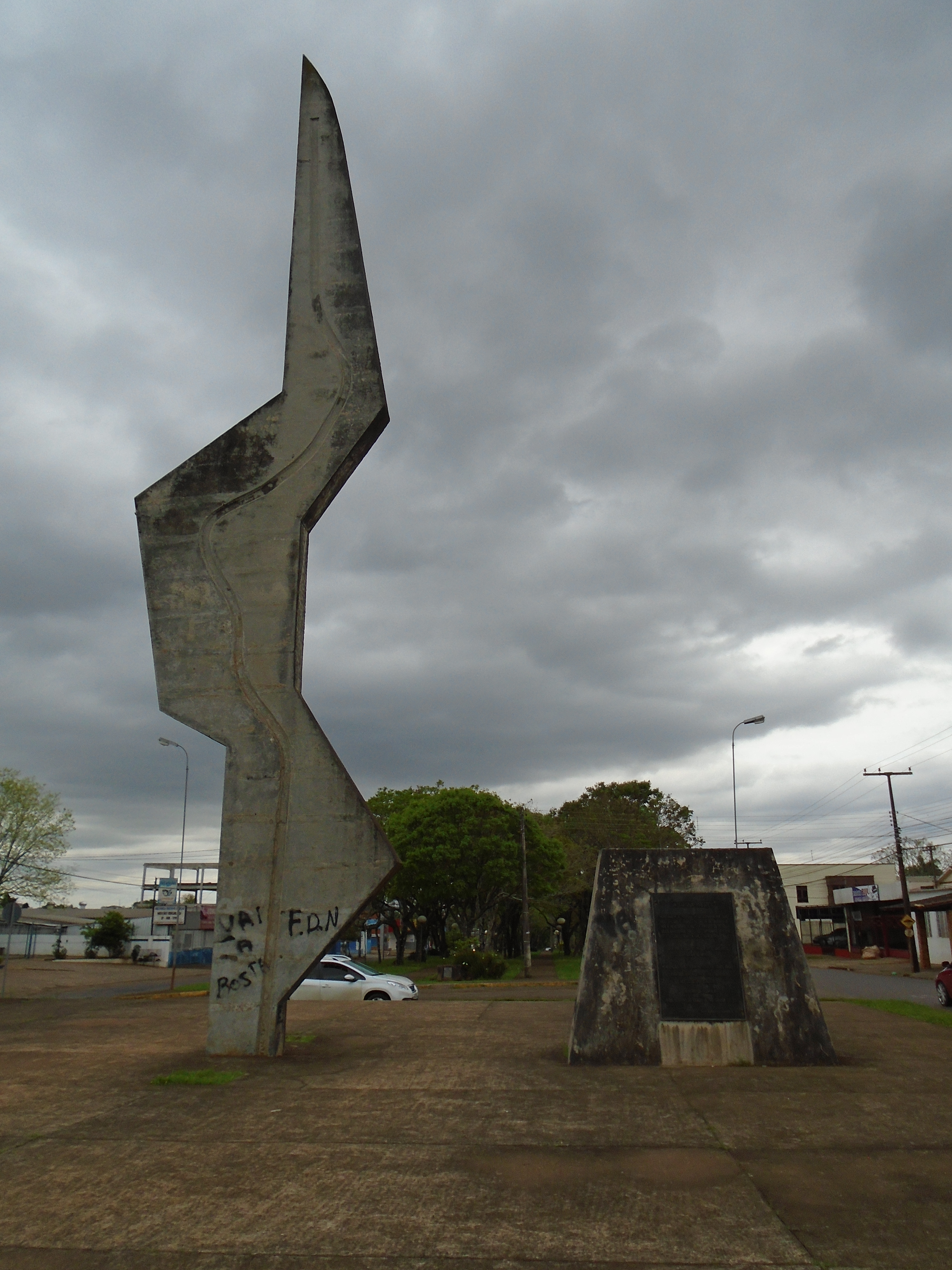
Monumento Coluna Prestes (Santo Ângelo, Brasil)

January 15 holds great significance in the history of Crateús. The date marks the passage of the Prestes Column through the city in 1926. Crateús stands as the most prominent location in Ceará for this event, as it is the only city in the country where significant conflict and deaths occurred during the passage of the movement led by Luís Carlos Prestes, active in Brazil between 1925 and 1927. Cabo Antonino Cabeleira and Tenente Tarquínio, members of the group, are buried in the city at a site known as the "Cemetery of the Rebels."

The Prestes Column was a movement that emerged from the tenentismo (lieutenants' movement). Brazilian military officers rebelled and began a two-year march across the country’s interior. Over the course of their journey, members of the Column traversed more than 25,000 kilometers in protest against the governments of the time.

The reception of the Prestes Column in the towns they passed through varied. In some places, they were welcomed as saviors and heroes by the local population, while in others, they were received coldly and with suspicion due to their actions.

In Crateús, combat occurred in various parts of the city between members of the group and the city’s legalist forces, according to historians. One key site was the Railway Station building (RFFSA), located in Gentil Cardoso Square. According to historian Flávio Machado, this is one of the primary locations associated with the events. “Some of these sites were even taken over by Prestes' group, like the Railway Station building. They seized control and planned to take over other locations. Crateús was the only city where there was actual confrontation,” highlights Machado. The Church Square and Padre Macedo Street (commonly referred to as “Pimenta Street”) were the sites of the heaviest fighting and most deaths among the military.

A monument was built in this square as a historic and cultural landmark. Its inauguration took place on January 14, 2006, marking the 80th anniversary of the event. The 13.5-meter monument was designed by Oscar Niemeyer, who provided the project to municipalities through which the Column passed. In Ceará, through the initiative of the Amnesty Commission and funding from the state government, the landmark was erected. It is the fourth of its kind in Brazil.

Crateús is the only city in the interior of the Northeast to feature a work by Oscar Niemeyer, Brazil’s most renowned architect.

Raimundo Soares de Sousa, a visual artist from Crateús, created a sculpture to commemorate the centennial of the passage of the Prestes Column in Crateús, which will be marked in 2026. The artist hopes that the piece will be placed at the Cemetery of the Rebels. “Ideally, a Cultural Center should be built here to tell the story of the conflict that occurred in Crateús,” Raimundo points out.

== Simbology ==
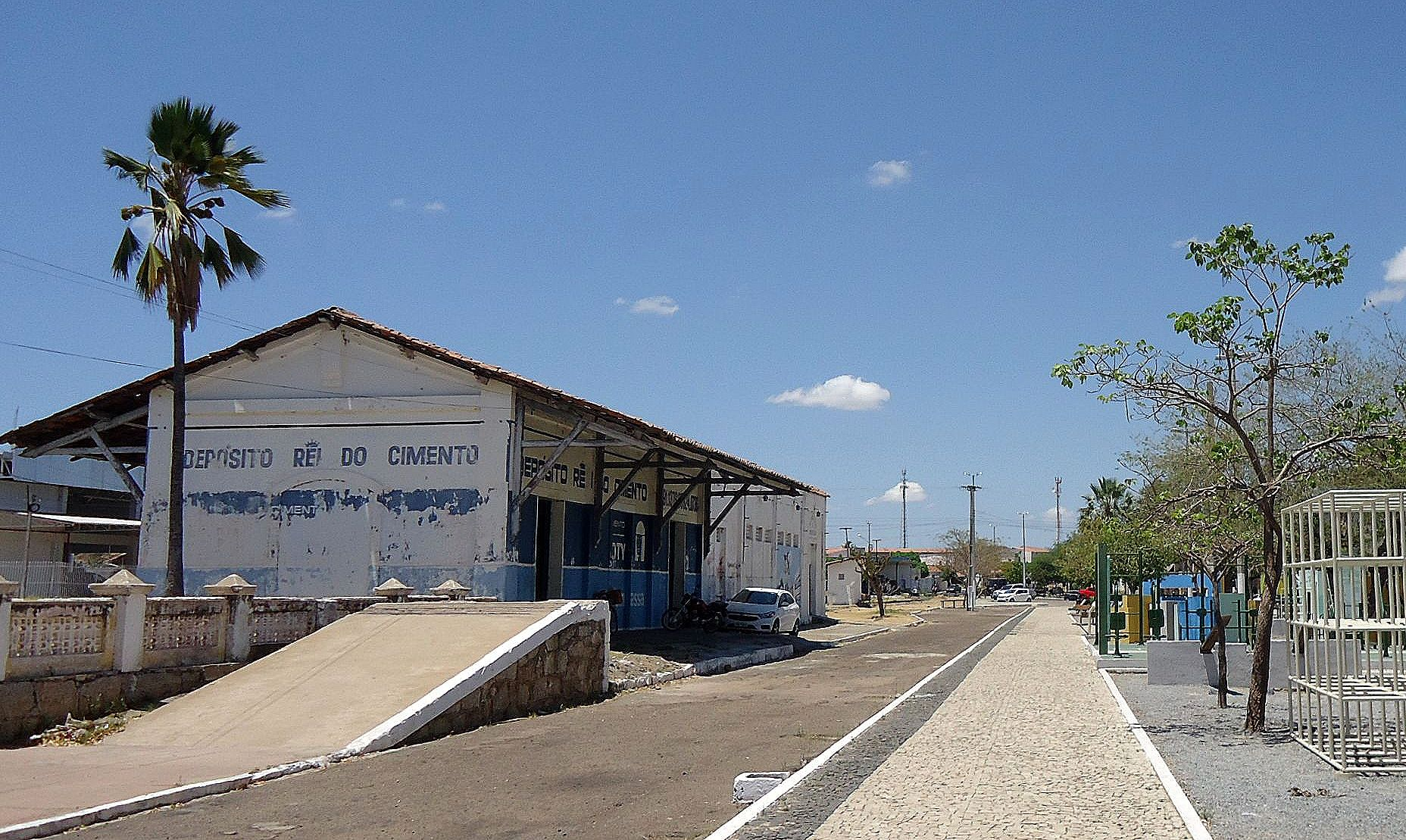
Crateús

=== Derivation ===
The origin of the toponym “Crateús” comes from the Tupi or Tapuia (Kariri), and may mean:

tupi: cará (potato) and teú (lizard);

kariri: kará (fish) te (land) and ús (People) or even composed of kra (“dry”) plus té, formed kraté (“dry thing” or “dry place”) and yú (very frequent) forming “frequent very dry place” us (“people” or “tribe”) or even referring to karatiús or karatís (native Indians of the region) which would become “Indians of the karati tribe”.

Crateús (IPA: [kɾateˈus]) (locally [kɾateˈuus ou kɾateˈuis]) and pronounced: kra-te-us, which can also be pronounced as kra-te-uis. When pronouncing the municipality's name, it is common for speakers to mistakenly pronounce it “crateus”, forgetting the acute accent on the letter 'U' (from such: Ú). This accent is a graphic sign used to indicate the stressed syllable with an open sound in certain words.

Its original name was “Fazenda Piranhas” (the name given to the farm owned by Dona Ávila Pereira, due to the abundance of this fish in the region), later elevated to the category of town with the “Príncipe Imperial do Piauí”.

== The flag ==
Flag of Crateús

The Flag of Crateús is one of the official symbols of this municipality, with a width-length ratio of 7:10. It consists of three horizontal stripes in yellow, white and green, and in the center is the municipal coat of arms. The yellow color symbolizes the riches of the municipality (at the time of its creation, mainly rice, whose husk, by the way, is yellowish in color). The color white in the center of the flag and where most of the coat of arms is located symbolizes peace, harmony and prosperity. The green color, on the other hand, alludes to the forests of Crateús, which were more abundant at the time, and to the Atlantic Forest in the Serra Grande. The flag can be used in all civic events of the people of Crateús, whether private or official.

== The coat of arms ==
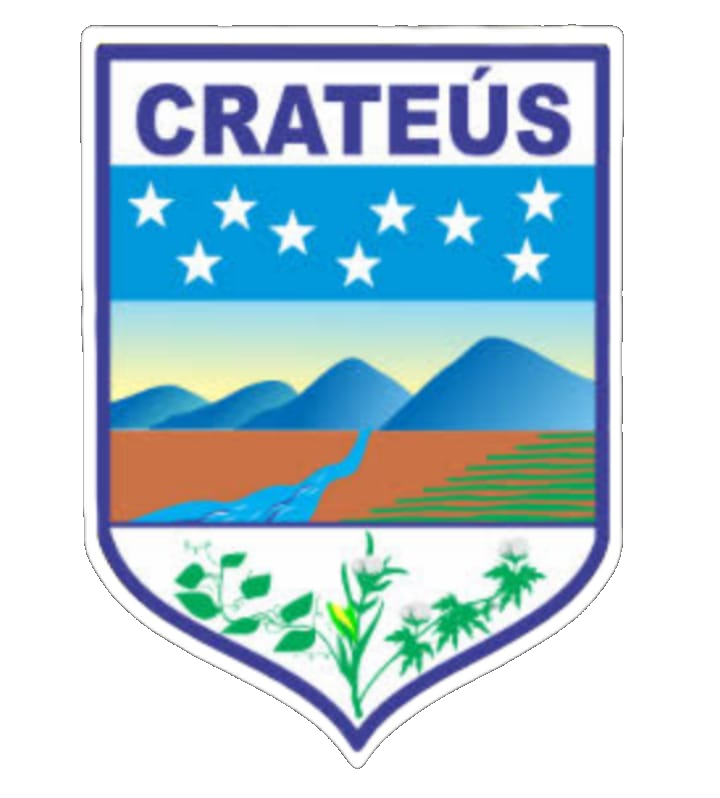
Coat of arms of Crateús

The Coat of Arms of Crateús refers to the riches and beauty of the municipality, such as the Serra da Ibiapaba and the Poti River Valley, which once leveraged the city's economy with large rural productions in agriculture and livestock farming, as well as corn and bean crops in the rich valleys of the region. The Coat of Arms of Crateús is also used in all civic events.

The use of the Crateús Coat of Arms is mandatory in the City Hall and the City Council, and is therefore used on official papers of the Executive and Legislative branches (documents, correspondence paper, invitations and official publications).

== The anthem ==
The Crateús Anthem has lyrics composed by doctor Antônio Carlos Barreto and a melody created by Expedito Paiva and Carlos César. Its external structure is of stanzas in rhyming quatrains.

== History ==
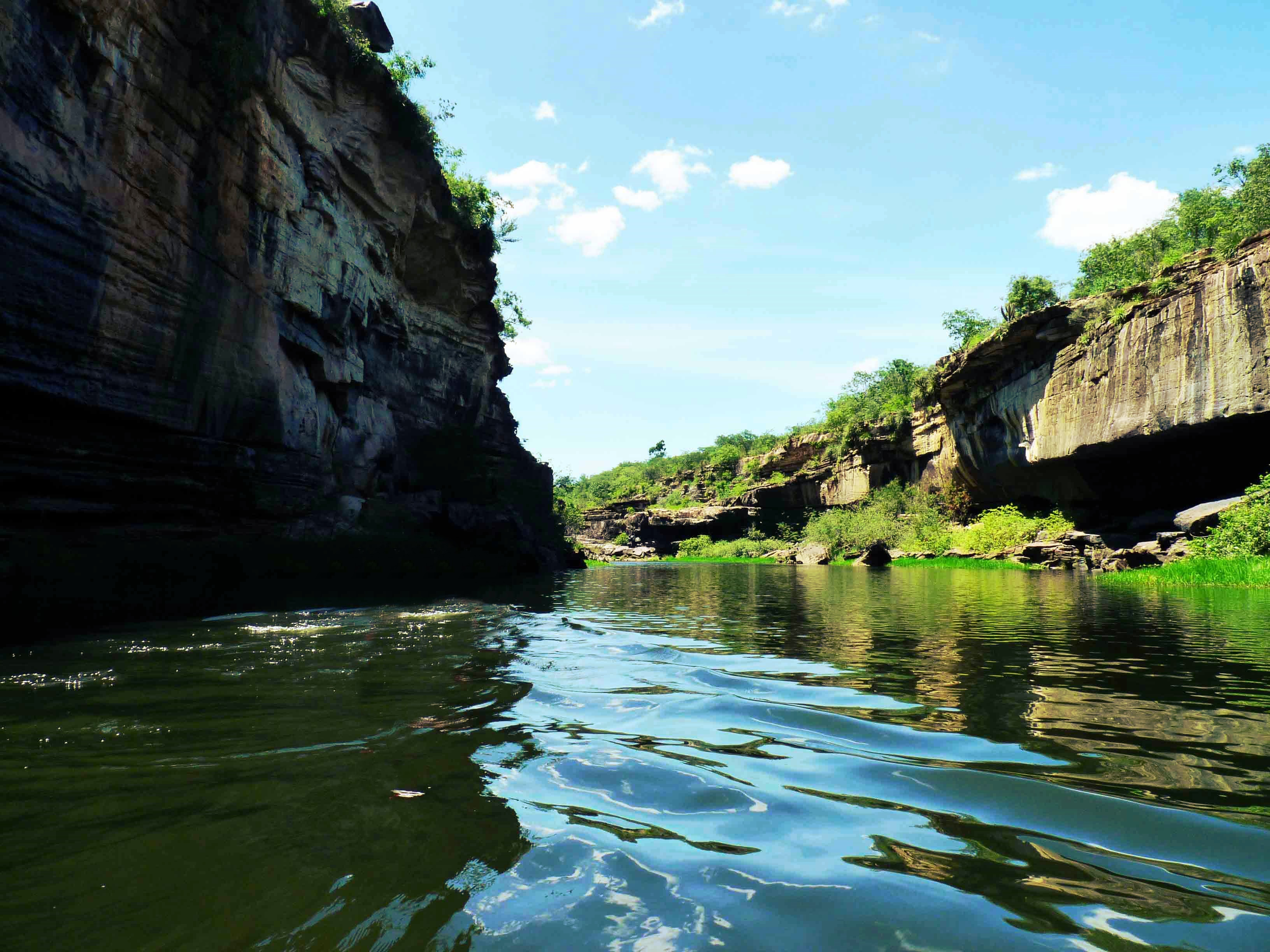
Rio Poti Crateús

The lands of Crateús, to the south of the Serra da Ibiapaba (Serra Grande) and on the banks of the Poti River, were inhabited by the Karatis Indians, before the arrival of the Portuguese and bandeirantes in the 17th century.

In 1721, the Crateús valley was bought by D. Ávila Pereira Passos for the price of four thousand cruzados. He was given possession of these lands on the Lagoa das Almas farm, 18 kilometers southwest of Vila Príncipe Imperial (today the city of Crateús), on the left bank of the Riacho do Gado, which flows into the Poti River.

With the success of the mercantilist economy, the Piauí town of Piranhas stood out as a trading post connecting Ceará and Piauí, due to the geographical accident (boqueirão) between Serra Grande and Ibiapaba, facilitating traffic between the two states.

The town of Príncipe Imperial was part of the state of Piauí until 1880, when it was annexed to the territory of Ceará as a result of the solution found to the territorial dispute between the two states. Ceará recognized Piauí's jurisdiction over the municipality of Amarração (Luís Correia) and in exchange Piauí offered two important Piauían municipalities: Independência and Príncipe Imperial.

With the expansion of the Sobral-Camocim Railroad into Piauí in 1911, the lands of Crateús were cut off by the railroad and, in 1912, two train stations were built in the municipality: Crateús and Sucesso, and then other stations were built in 1916 Poti, in 1918 Ibiapaba, in 1932 Oiticica and Santa Terezinha.

Due to the geographic accident of the Poti River canyon, which cuts through the Serra da Ibiapaba (Serra Grande) forming a natural connection between Ceará and Piauí, the mercantilism between the two states and the growth around the railroad, Crateús developed as an urban and commercial center in which various ethnic groups are present, both indigenous (Tabajara, Potyguara, Calabaça, Kariri, Tupinambá) and of African descent (Quilombos: Queimadas).

=== Administrative formation ===
In 1832, the Piauí town of Piranhas (Crateús) was elevated to the category of town and district under the name of Príncipe Imperial do Piauí, being separated from Castelo do Piauí by general law no. 06-07-1832, with its headquarters in the nucleus of Piranhas. In 1853, it already had a district, the Povoação de Pelo-Signal (now the municipality of Independência and comprising the areas of the current municipalities of Quiterianópolis and Novo Oriente) and was elevated to the category of town and dismembered from Príncipe Imperial do Piauí (Crateús) in 1857.

In 1880, it was transferred from the former province of Piauí to the province of Ceará by Law (general decree) No. 3,020 of October 22, 1880. In 1889, it changed its name to Crateús, which was made official by Decree Law No. 01 of December 2, 1889. In 1911, it was elevated to city status. In 1920, the municipality already had 2 districts: Barrinha (Ibiapaba) and Santana. In 1929, the Barrinha (Ibiapaba) district changed its name to Ibiapaba, and in the same year another district was formed: Irapuã. In the 1933 administrative division, Santana does not appear as a municipal district; in the table, in addition to the district-headquarters, only Graça, Ibiapaba, Irapuã and Tucuns appear. In 1938. Irapuã was downgraded to a village, Graça changed its name to Chaves, and two more districts were created: Oiticica and Poti. In 1944, Chaves was renamed Rosa. In 1951, Irapuá was again elevated to district status and another district was created: Montenebo. In 1955, another district was created: Santo Antonio.

== See also ==
- Ceará#Largest cities
- List of municipalities in Ceará
