= Marly Sarney =

32nd First Lady of Brazil

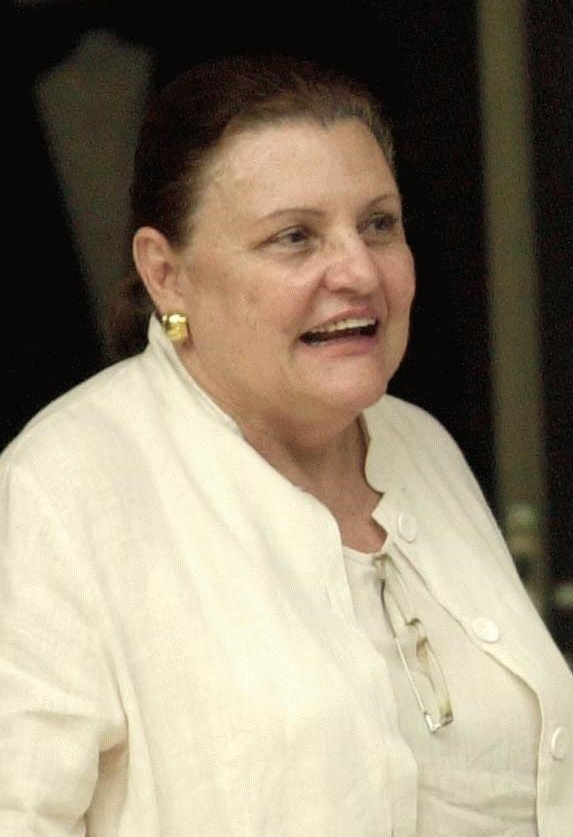
- Sarney in 2004

First Lady of Brazil
- In role 15 March 1985 – 15 March 1990
- President: José Sarney
- Preceded by: Dulce Figueiredo
- Succeeded by: Rosane Collor

Second Lady of Brazil
- In role 15 March 1985 – 21 April 1985
- Vice President: José Sarney
- Preceded by: Vivi Chaves
- Succeeded by: Anna Maria Maciel

First Lady of Maranhão
- In role 31 January 1966 – 14 May 1970
- Governor: José Sarney
- Preceded by: Aldenora Bello
- Succeeded by: Enide Jorge Dino

Personal details
- Born: Marly Pádua Macieira; 4 December 1932 (age 93) São Luís, Maranhão, Brazil
- Party: MDB
- Spouse: José Sarney (m. 1952)
- Children: Roseana Sarney; Fernando Sarney; Sarney Filho

Marly Macieira Sarney (née Pádua Macieira; born 4 December 1932) is the wife of the former president of Brazil José Sarney. She was First Lady of Brazil during the presidency of her husband, between 1985 and 1990.

== Biography ==
Sarney married José Sarney on 12 July 1952.
