= Vital Soares =

Vice President-elect of Brazil (1930)

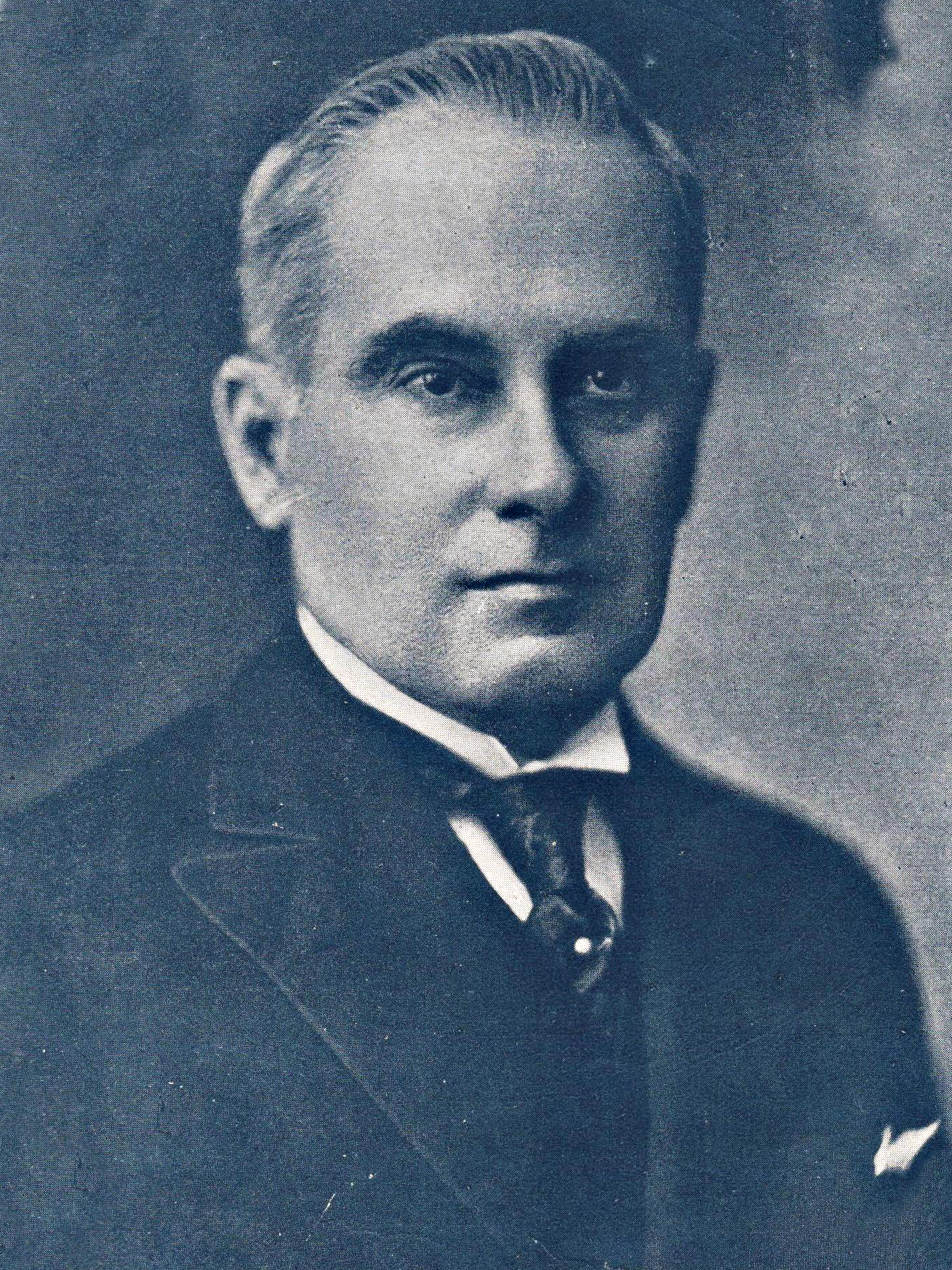

Vice President-elect of Brazil
- In role 1 March 1930 – 24 October 1930
- President: Júlio Prestes (elect)
- Preceded by: Melo Viana (1926)
- Succeeded by: Nereu Ramos (1946)

President of Bahia
- In office 19 March 1928 – 1 March 1930
- Preceded by: Góis Calmon
- Succeeded by: Frederico Costa

Member of the Chamber of Deputies
- In office 17 November 1926 – 31 October 1927
- Constituency: Bahia

Personal details
- Born: 13 November 1874 Valença, Bahia, Empire of Brazil
- Died: 19 April 1933 (aged 58) Salvador, Bahia, Brazil
- Education: Free Faculty of Law of Bahia

Vital Henrique Batista Soares (13 November 1874 – 19 April 1933) was a Brazilian lawyer and politician.

Soares was born in Valença, Bahia. He served as a president of Bahia from 1928 to 1930.

He was elected Vice President of Brazil on 1 March 1930 but was prevented from taking office by a coup that brought Getúlio Vargas to power, just three weeks before scheduled inauguration along with President-elect Júlio Prestes.

Soares died in Salvador, Bahia, aged 58.

Political offices
| Preceded by Góis Calmon | President of Bahia; 1928–1930 | Succeeded by Frederico Costa |
| Preceded by Melo Viana | Vice President-elect of Brazil; 1930 | Succeeded by Military Junta (interim) |
