= Rosane Collor =

33rd First Lady of Brazil

Rosane Malta
- Rosane in 1992

First Lady of Brazil
- In role 15 March 1990 – 29 December 1992
- President: Fernando Collor de Mello
- Preceded by: Marly Sarney
- Succeeded by: Ruth Cardoso (1995)

First Lady of Alagoas
- In role 15 March 1987 – 14 May 1989
- Governor: Fernando Collor de Mello
- Preceded by: Liege Tavares
- Succeeded by: Telma Andrade

Personal details
- Born: Rosane Brandão Malta; 20 October 1964 (age 62) Canapi, Alagoas, Brazil
- Party: PODE (2019–present)
- Other political affiliations: PHS (Until 2019)
- Spouse: Fernando Collor de Mello (m. 1984; div. 2005)

Rosane Brandão Malta (formerly Rosane Collor de Mello; born 20 October 1964) is the former First Lady of Brazil, during the presidency of her husband, Fernando Collor de Mello, from 1990 until 1992. She was Collor's second wife and part of the politically powerful Malta and Brandão families of Alagoas.

As first lady, she was given the honorary position of president of the Legião Brasileira de Assistência (LBA), a welfare organization, a position she resigned in 1991. LBA was extinguished by Fernando Collor's orders in 1991. In September 1992 she was indicted for embezzling funds from the LBA and directing them to friends and family. Visible rifts occurred between Rosane and Collor during his presidency, with the President often appearing in public without his wedding ring. In April 2000, she was found guilty on charges of abuse of power and misuse of funds and sentenced to 11 years in prison, although this sentence was annulled on June 26 of that year.

In 2018, she ran unsuccessfully for State Deputy of Alagoas by the Humanist Party of Solidarity (PHS).

Honorary titles
Preceded by Liege Tavares	First Lady of Alagoas; 1987–1989	Succeeded by Telma Andrade
Preceded by Marly Sarney	First Lady of Brazil; 1990–1992	Vacant Title next held by Ruth Cardoso
