= Dulce Figueiredo =

31st First Lady of Brazil (1923–2011)

Dulce Maria Figueiredo

First Lady of Brazil
- In role March 15, 1979 – March 14, 1985
- President: João Figueiredo
- Preceded by: Lucy Geisel
- Succeeded by: Marly Sarney

Personal details
- Born: Dulce Maria Guimarães de Castro; May 11, 1923 Rio de Janeiro, Brazil
- Died: June 6, 2011 (aged 88) Rio de Janeiro, Brazil
- Cause of death: Cancer
- Resting place: Caju Cemetery; Rio de Janeiro, Brazil
- Spouse: João Figueiredo (m. 1942; died 1999)
- Children: 2

Dulce Maria Guimarães de Castro Figueiredo (May 11, 1923 – June 6, 2011) was the wife of former Brazilian president João Figueiredo and thus the First Lady of Brazil from 1979 to 1985.

After the death of her husband in December 1999, Dulce began to face financial difficulties. In March 2001, she organized an auction to sell items her late husband had received while he ruled the country and received criticism from the press. Among the 218 objects auctioned were a bronze cowboy sculpture by Ronald Reagan; two paintings by Di Cavalcanti; a Portuguese statue of Roque de Montpellier presented by Antonio Carlos Magalhães; an inkwell brought by King Juan Carlos of Spain; a silver tray offered by Augusto Pinochet; and a box of cigars given by Valéry Giscard d'Estaing. About one million reais were collected, and approximately 82% of this amount went to Dulce Figueiredo, who, as a general's widow, received a pension of 8,865 reais.

A widow since 1999, she died June 6, 2011, at a clinic in Botafogo, Rio de Janeiro aged 88. Her body was buried in the mausoleum of the Figueiredos, in the Caju Cemetery.

Honorary titles
Preceded by Lucy Geisel	First Lady of Brazil; 1979–85	Succeeded by Marly Sarney
