= Kissinger Lecture =

The Kissinger Lecture on Foreign Policy and International Relations is an annual lecture given by an invited speaker at the Library of Congress in Washington, D.C. It was established in 2001 to honor Henry Kissinger, the former United States Secretary of State, along with the annual Kissinger Scholar as holder of the Henry Alfred Kissinger Chair in Foreign Policy and International Relations that was established in 2000.

The lectures have been given by:

- Henry Kissinger, Inaugural Lecture 2001
- Valéry Giscard d'Estaing, 2003
- George Shultz, 2004
- Fernando Henrique Cardoso, 2005
- James Baker, 2007
