= Ruth Cardoso =

First Lady of Brazil from 1995 to 2003

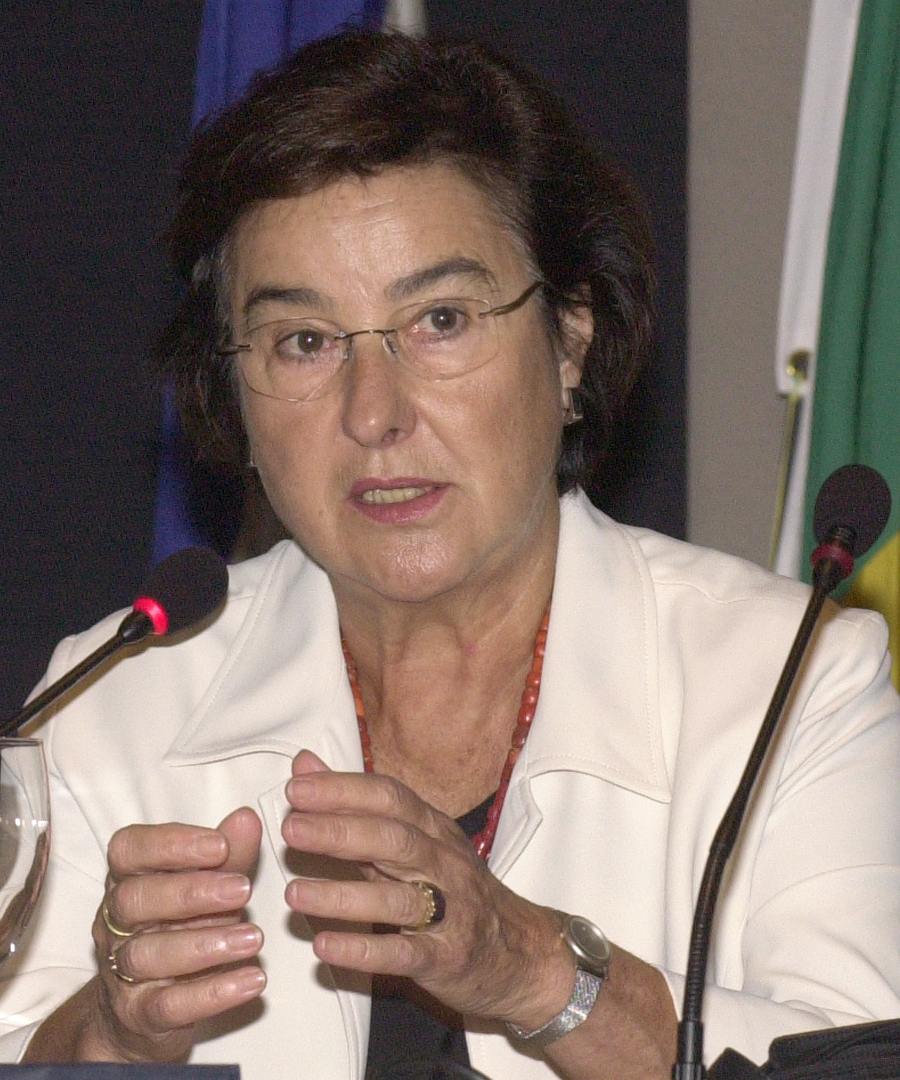
- Ruth Cardoso in 2006

First Lady of Brazil
- In role 1 January 1995 – 1 January 2003
- President: Fernando Henrique Cardoso
- Preceded by: Rosane Collor
- Succeeded by: Marisa Letícia Lula da Silva

Personal details
- Born: Ruth Vilaça Correia Leite; 19 September 1930 Araraquara, São Paulo, Brazil
- Died: 24 June 2008 (aged 77) São Paulo, Brazil
- Cause of death: Cardiac arrest
- Spouse: Fernando Henrique Cardoso (m. 1953)
- Children: 3
- Occupation: Anthropologist

Ruth Vilaça Correia Leite Cardoso GCIH (19 September 1930 – 24 June 2008) was a Brazilian anthropologist and a member of the faculty of philosophy, letters and human sciences at the University of São Paulo (FFLCH-USP). She was the wife of 34th president of Brazil, Fernando Henrique Cardoso, and First Lady of her country between 1995 and 2003. She too was a Ph.D. in anthropology from the University of São Paulo.

As professor and researcher Cardoso taught at the Latin American College of Social Sciences (Flacso/Unesco), University of Chile (Santiago), Maison des Sciences de L'Homme (Paris), University of California, Berkeley, and Columbia University (New York City). She was an associate member of the Center for Latin American Studies of the University of Cambridge. With her husband, the sociologist and former president of Brazil, Fernando Henrique Cardoso, she founded and later directed the research institute Cebrap (Centro Brasileiro de Análise e Planejamento – Brazilian Center of Analysis and Planning), which continues to be a leading site of social science research in Brazil.

Dr. Cardoso's academic reputation rests primarily on a series of highly influential articles and book chapters on popular movements and political participation that she published in the 1980s and 1990s. Under Dr. Cardoso, Cebrap created Brazil's first research group on social movements, helping to legitimate formal academic study of the "new" (non-class) social movements that had emerged in the 1970s. At the same time, she was careful to stress the limits of identity-based and popular movements for political transformation, noting the divisions among them and their frequent dependency on clientelistic relations with the state and political parties.

Unlike many academics, Dr. Cardoso also had the opportunity to put some of her theories into practice after her husband was elected president. She transformed the traditional charity approach of other first ladies with her Comunidade Solidária (Solidary Community) programs that stressed the role of non-governmental organizations (NGOs) in state-society partnerships. In addition to executing concrete social programs, Comunidade Solidária also facilitated broad discussions of important social topics, from agrarian reform to the legal status of NGOs, publishing the results of these dialogues. Anthony Hall of the London School of Economics told the BBC after her death that she was instrumental in developing the plan to bundle various social programs together in the way that has become characteristic of the successful Bolsa Familia social program. She published a book about these experiences, Comunidade Solidaria: Fortalecendo a Sociedade, Promovendo O Desenvolvimento (Comunitas, 2002). She transformed the Comunidade Solidaria into an NGO, Comunitas, after her husband left office.

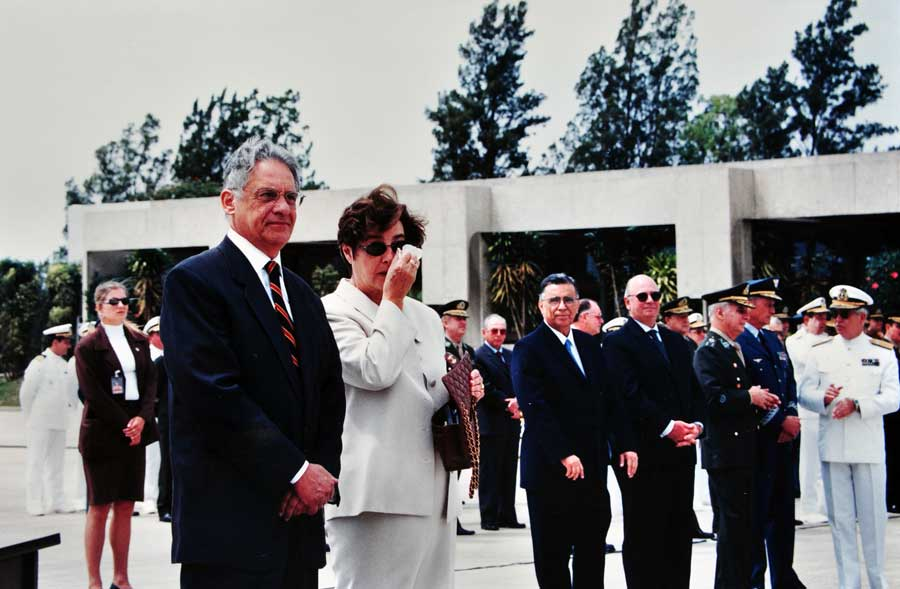
The President and First Lady attend a military ceremony.

She died in São Paulo on 24 June 2008, after suffering a cardiac arrest. She had been discharged from the Sírio-Libanês Hospital the previous day, 23 June 2008, having previously been admitted with chest pains.

== Publications ==
Books

- Bibliografia Sobre a Juventude (with Helena Sampaio, Edusp, 1995)
- Comunidade Solidaria: Fortalecendo a Sociedade, Promovendo O Desenvolvimento (Comunitas, 2002)

Articles and miscellaneous works

- 1983: Movimentos Sociais Urbanos: Balanço Crítico. In Sociedade e Política no Brasil Pós-64, ed. B. Sorj and M.H. Tavares de Almeida. São Paulo: Brasiliense.
- 1987: Os Movimentos Sociais na América Latina. Revista Brasileira de Ciências Sociais 2(5): 27–37.
- 1987: As Mulheres e a Democracia. Revista de Ciências Sociais 1(2): 287–304.
- 1988: Os Movimentos Populares no Contexto da Consolidação da Democracia. In A Democracia no Brasil: Dilemas e Perspectivas, ed. F.W. Reis and G. O’Donnell. São Paulo: Vértice.
- 1988: Isso É Política? Dilemas da Participação Popular entre o Moderno e o Pós-Moderno. Novos Estudos do CEBRAP 20: 74–80.
- 1990: Participação Política e Democracia. Novos Estudos CEBRAP 26: 15–24.
- 1992: Popular Movements in the Context of the Consolidation of Democracy in Brazil. In The Making of Social Movements in Latin America: Identity, Strategy, and Democracy, ed. A. Escobar and S.E. Alvarez. Boulder: Westview.
- 1997: Fortalecimento da Sociedade Civil. In 3º Setor: Desenvolvimento Social Sustentado, Evelyn Berg. Rio de Janeiro: Gife and Paz e Terra

Honorary titles
Vacant Title last held by Rosane Collor	First Lady of Brazil; 1995–2003	Succeeded by Marisa Letícia Lula da Silva
