= Rosângela Lula da Silva =

First Lady of Brazil since 2023

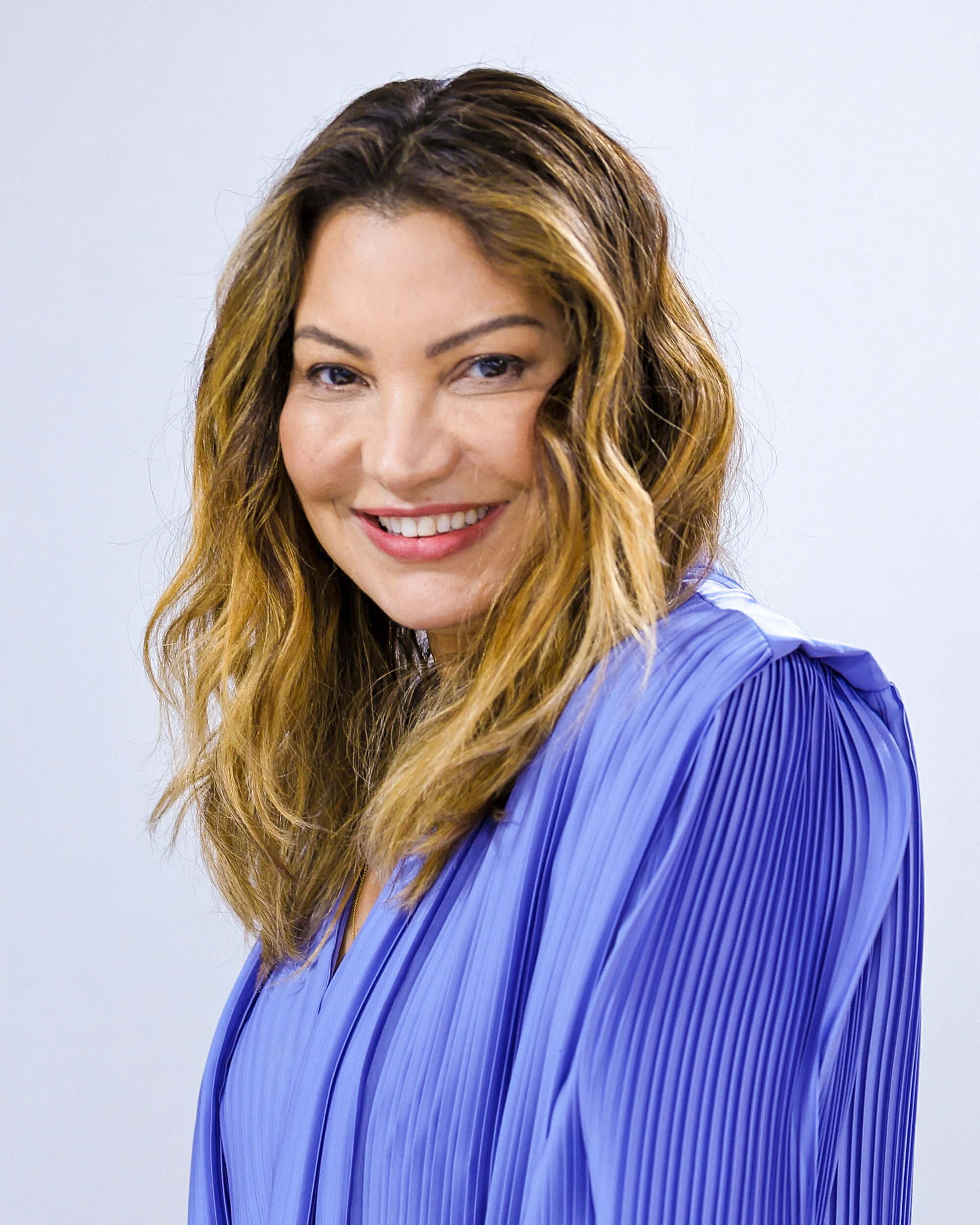
- Rosângela in 2023

First Lady of Brazil
- Current
- Assumed role 1 January 2023
- President: Luiz Inácio Lula da Silva
- Preceded by: Michelle Bolsonaro

Personal details
- Born: Rosângela da Silva; 27 August 1966 (age 60) União da Vitória, Paraná, Brazil
- Party: PT (1983–present)
- Spouse(s): Marco Aurélio Monteiro Pereira (m. 1995; div. 1996) Luiz Inácio Lula da Silva (m. 2022)
- Children: 1
- Education: Federal University of Paraná (BSS)

Rosângela Lula da Silva (born 27 August 1966), commonly known as Janja, is the first lady of Brazil as the wife of President Luiz Inácio Lula da Silva. Previously, she was an assistant to the Director-General and coordinator of sustainable development programs at hydroelectric dam Itaipu Binacional, and a communications and institutional affairs advisor at electric utilities company Eletrobras.

== Biography ==
Rosângela was born in União da Vitória, in the state of Paraná. She is the daughter of José Clóvis da Silva (died 2024) and Vani Terezinha Ferreira (died in 2020 from COVID-19). She moved to Curitiba during her childhood. Silva joined the Workers' Party at 17 years of age, in 1983. In 1990, she enrolled for studies of Social Science at the Federal University of Paraná and specialized in History.

Janja began working at hydroelectric dam Itaipu Binacional on 1 January 2005 and was an assistant to the Director-General, as well as coordinator of sustainable development programs. Between 2012 and 2016, she was communications and institutional affairs advisor at electric utilities company Eletrobras, in Rio de Janeiro. In 2016, she returned to Itaipu. She resigned from the company on 1 January 2020.

== Personal life ==
Janja and Luiz Inácio Lula da Silva began dating in 2017. They remained together when Lula was arrested and incarcerated at the Federal Police headquarters in Curitiba in April 2018. Lula complained that they were not given conjugal rights.

When Lula was released, on 8 November 2019, he and Janja announced their engagement. They married on 18 May 2022 in São Paulo in a Catholic ceremony.

== First Lady of Brazil (2023–present) ==
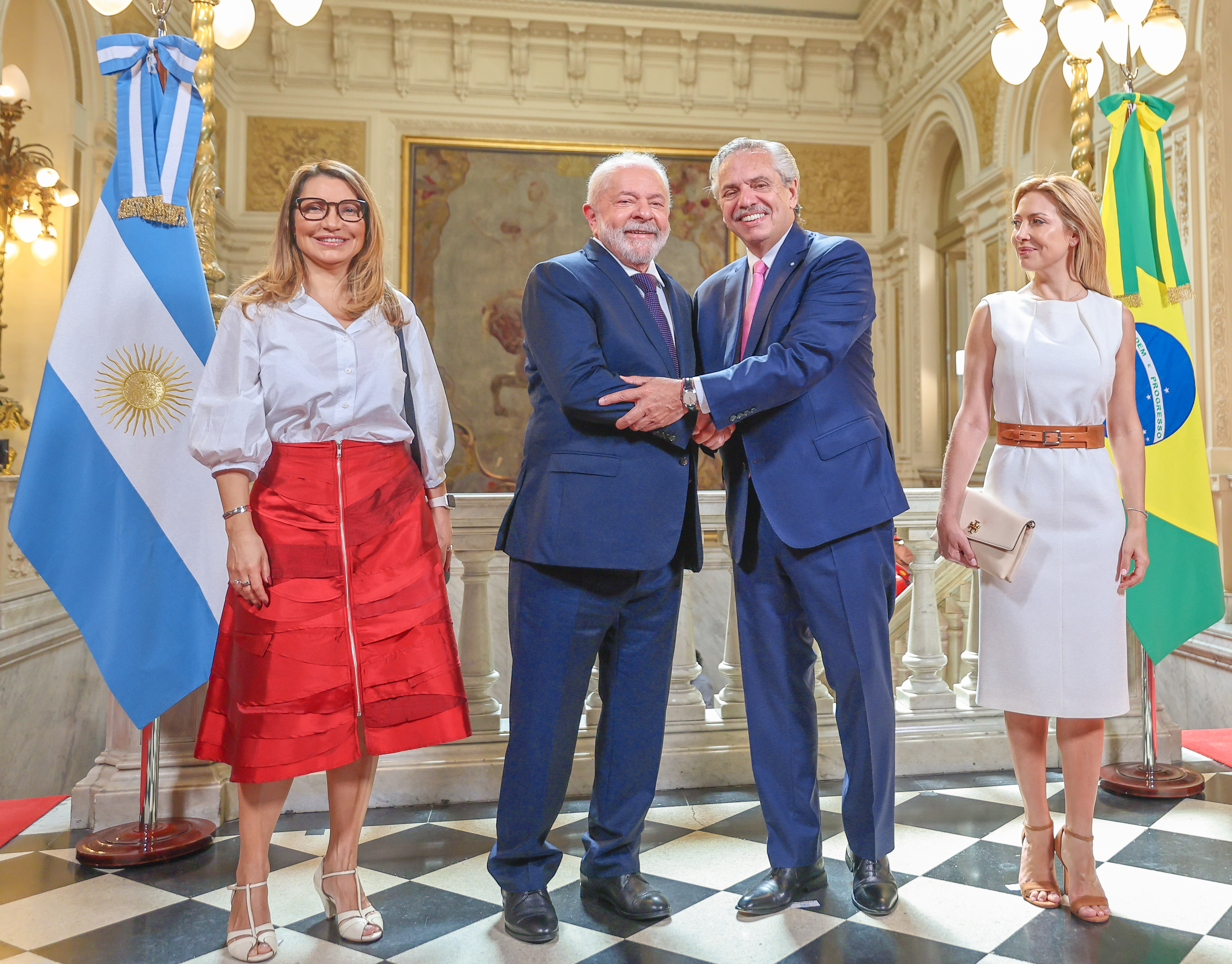
Janja, Lula, Alberto Fernández and Fabiola Yáñez at the Casa Rosada

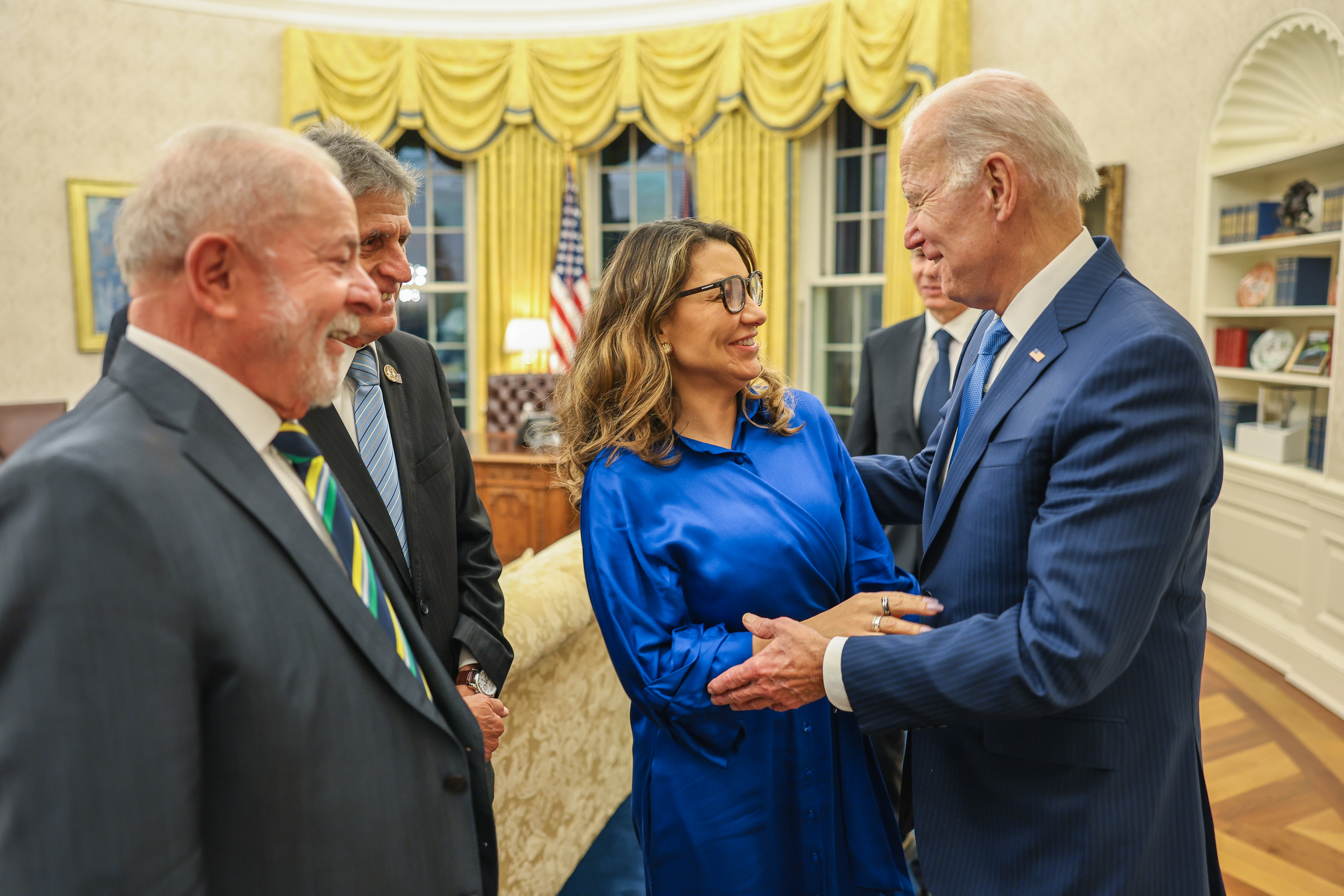
President Lula and Janja with Joe Biden in the Oval Office

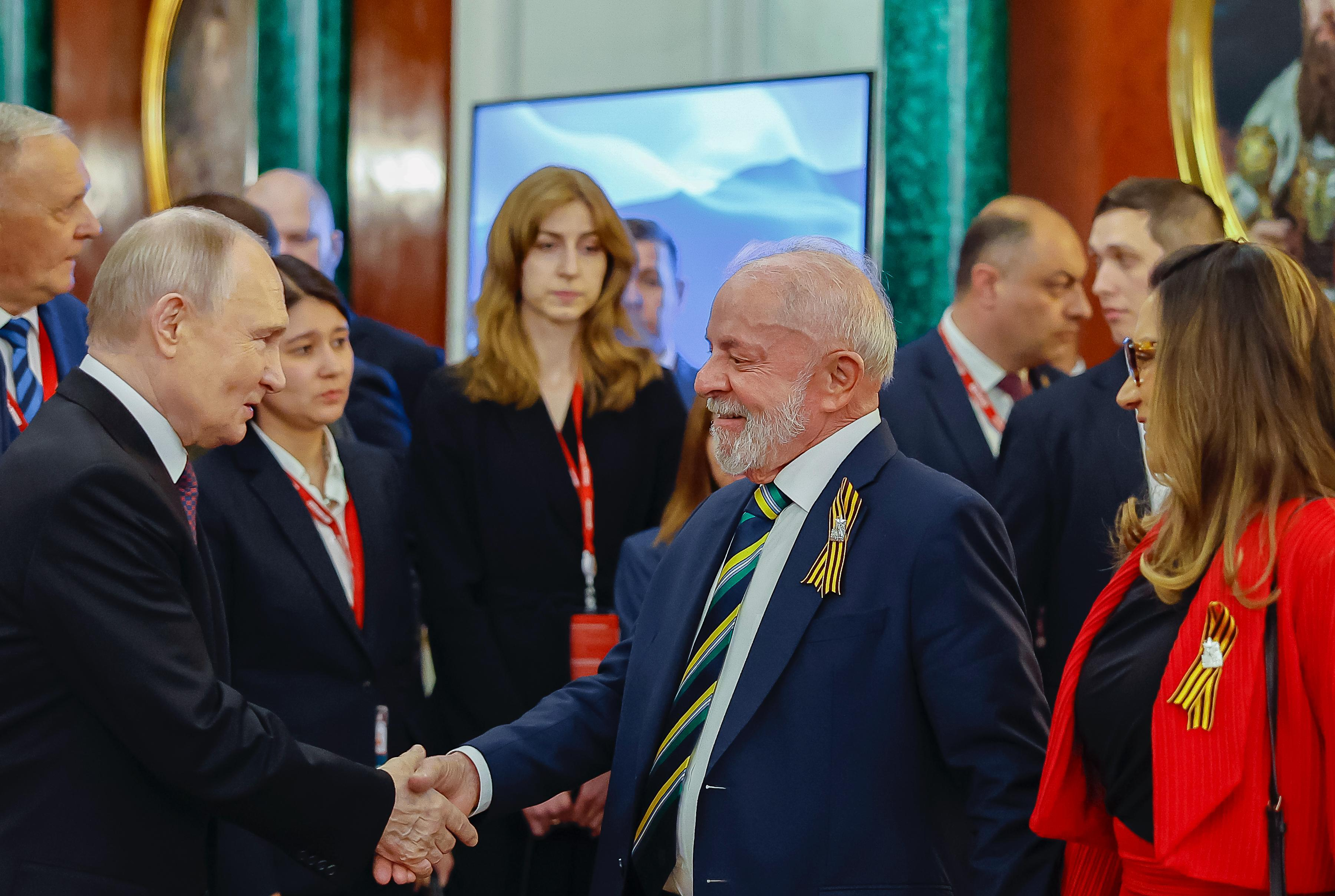
President Lula and Janja with Vladimir Putin in the Grand Kremlin Palace

On 1 January 2023, she became the 38th First Lady of Brazil, in President Luiz Inácio Lula da Silva's third term. Janja established an office at the Palace of Planalto, the presidency's official headquarters in Brasilia.

Janja has regularly participated, alongside her husband, in meetings with heads of states and official events. She has also been a strong advocate of women's rights, and released an image of herself on social media with racial equality minister Anielle Franco in solidarity with the latter after she was named as a victim of sexual misconduct by human rights minister Silvio Almeida in September 2024.

In December 2023, she said she would sue social media platform X, formerly known as Twitter, after her Twitter account was hacked. Elon Musk, who owns Twitter, responded: "It is not clear how someone guessing her email password is our responsibility."

On 16 November 2024, during a speech about fake news at the 2024 G20 Rio de Janeiro summit, she swore at Elon Musk, saying: "I'm not afraid of you. Fuck you, Elon Musk" (Eu não tenho medo de você. Inclusive, fuck you, Elon Musk, in Portuguese). Hours later, he wrote on X: "They're going to lose the elections soon," responding to a post with Janja's video.

In May 2025, Brazilian media reported that Janja had an exchange with General Secretary of the Chinese Communist Party Xi Jinping during a dinner with Lula in Beijing about TikTok allegedly favoring the political right in its algorithms. In June 2025, a Datafolha poll found that 36% of Brazilians thought that her actions hurt the government, while 14% say they are helpful.

== Honours ==
=== National honours ===
- Brazil: Grand Cross of the Order of Rio Branco (21 November 2023)
- Brazil Grand Cross of the Order of Cultural Merit (May 20, 2025)
- Brazil Grand Cross of the Educational Merit (14 November 2025)

=== Foreign honours ===
- Portugal: Grand Cross of the Order of Prince Henry (22 April 2023)
- France: Officer of the Legion of Honour (28 March 2024)
- Italy: Grand Cross of the Order of Merit of the Italian Republic (10 July 2024)

Honorary titles
Preceded by Michelle Bolsonaro	First Lady of Brazil; 2023–present	Current holder
