= Marisa Letícia Lula da Silva =

First Lady of Brazil from 2003 to 2011

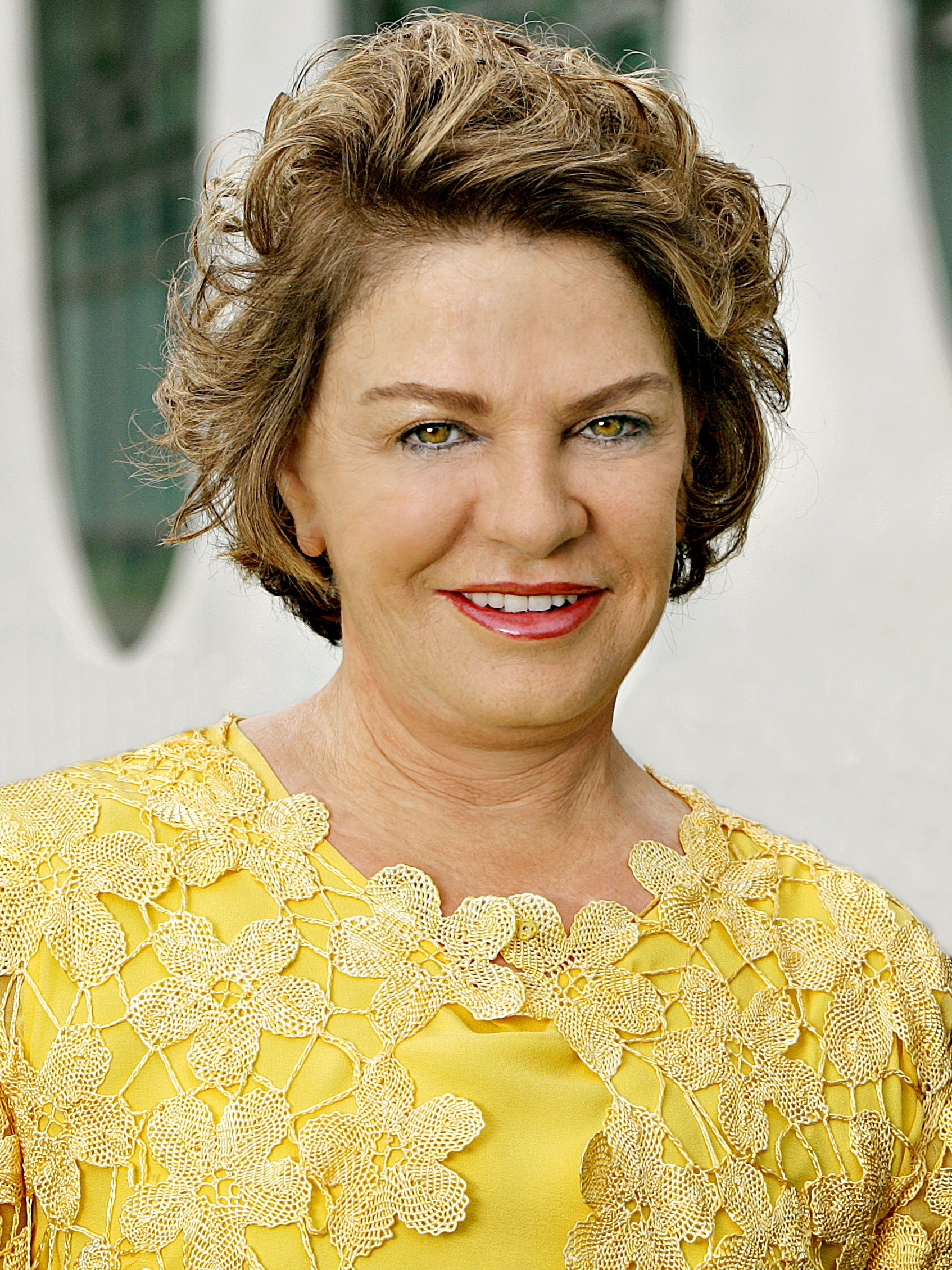
- Marisa Letícia in 2007

First Lady of Brazil
- In role 1 January 2003 – 1 January 2011
- President: Luiz Inácio Lula da Silva
- Preceded by: Ruth Cardoso
- Succeeded by: Marcela Temer (2016)

Personal details
- Born: Marisa Letícia Casa; 7 April 1950 São Bernardo do Campo, São Paulo, Brazil
- Died: 3 February 2017 (aged 66) São Paulo, Brazil
- Resting place: Jardim da Colina Cemetery; São Bernardo do Campo, São Paulo, Brazil; 23.7065676°S 46.5269805°W
- Citizenship: Brazilian; Italian
- Party: PT (1980–2017)
- Spouses: Marcos Cláudio dos Santos (m. 1970; died 1971) Luiz Inácio da Silva (m. 1974)
- Children: 4
- Awards: • - Grand Cross of the Order of Merit • Dame Grand Cross of the Order of Isabella the Catholic • - Grand Cross of the Order of Liberty • Grand Cross of the Military Order of Christ

Marisa Letícia Lula da Silva (née Casa; 7 April 1950 – 3 February 2017) was the second wife of the 35th and 39th president of Brazil Luiz Inácio Lula da Silva, and First Lady of Brazil from 2003 to 2011.

== Biography ==
Marisa Letícia Casa da Silva was born in São Bernardo do Campo as the tenth child in a working-class family of Italian descent. She worked as a caregiver from the age of nine onwards, and later in a chocolate factory from the age of fourteen.

In 1970, da Silva married her first husband Marcos Cláudio dos Santos, with whom she had one child. That same year, her husband died during a robbery assault.

In May 1974, da Silva married Lula da Silva, whom she had met the prior year. They had three sons together. Described as an "activist in her own right" and a "close advisor to Lula", she led the campaign for her husband's release after the military regime jailed him for his involvement in the 1978–1980 strike wave. However, da Silva was later seen as a "private person" who rarely gave interviews.

On 24 January 2017, da Silva suffered a stroke. She died ten days later on 3 February, at the age of 66 at Sírio-Libanês Hospital. President Michel Temer declared three days of official mourning. She was cremated the next day. Her ashes were interred in the Cemitério Jardim da Colina, in her native São Bernardo do Campo, São Paulo.

== Awards and decorations ==
- Denmark: Grand Cross of the Order of the Dannebrog (12 September 2007)
- Portugal:
  - Grand Cross of the Order of Christ (5 March 2008)
  - Grand Cross of the Order of Liberty (23 July 2003)
- Netherlands: Grand Cross of the Order of the Crown (10 April 2008)
- Norway: Grand Cross of the Royal Norwegian Order of Merit (7 October 2003)
- Spain: Dame Grand Cross of the Order of Isabella the Catholic
- Sweden: Member Grand Cross of the Order of the Polar Star

== Gallery ==
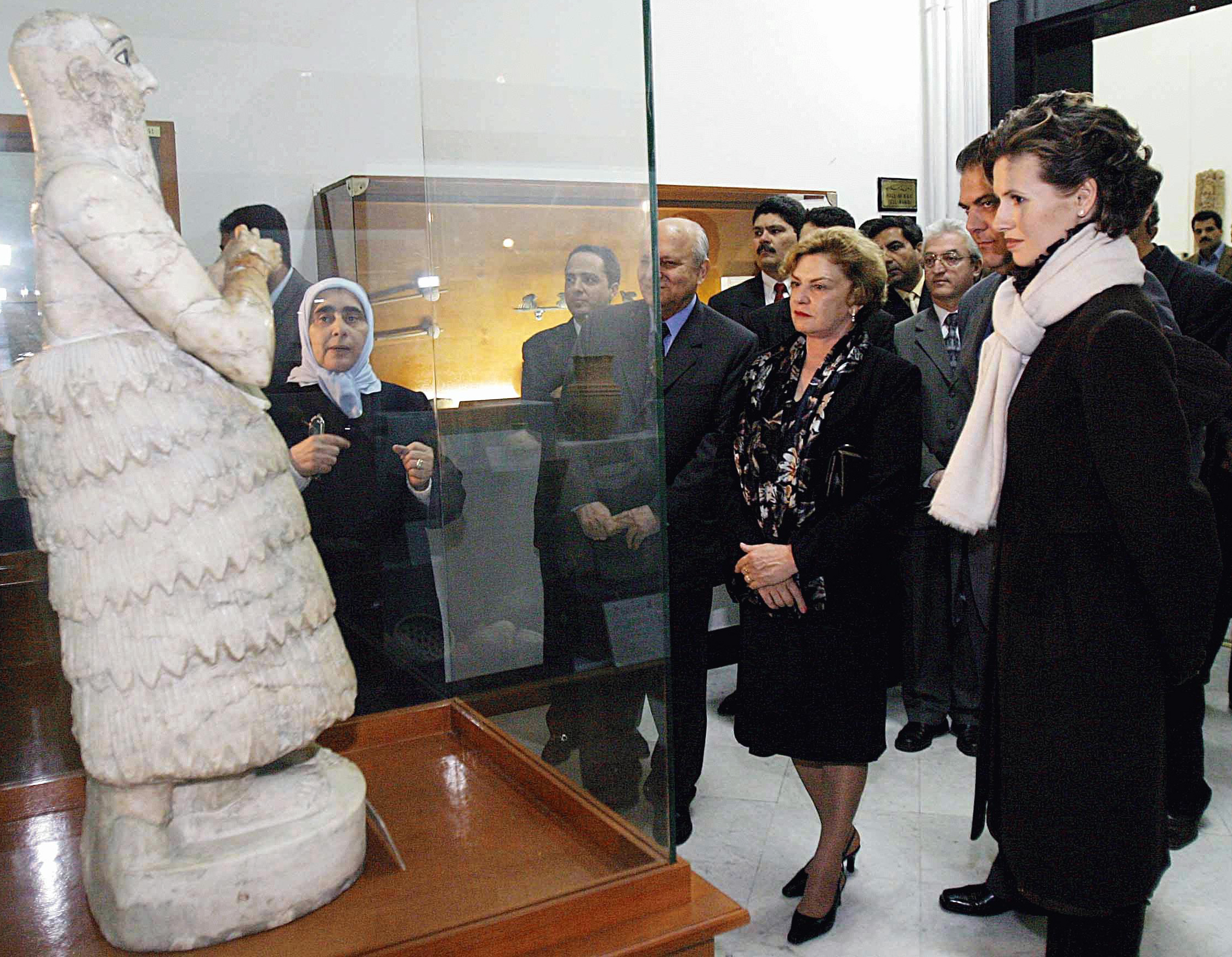
Marisa Letícia with Syrian First Lady Asma al-Assad at the National Museum of Damascus in 2003

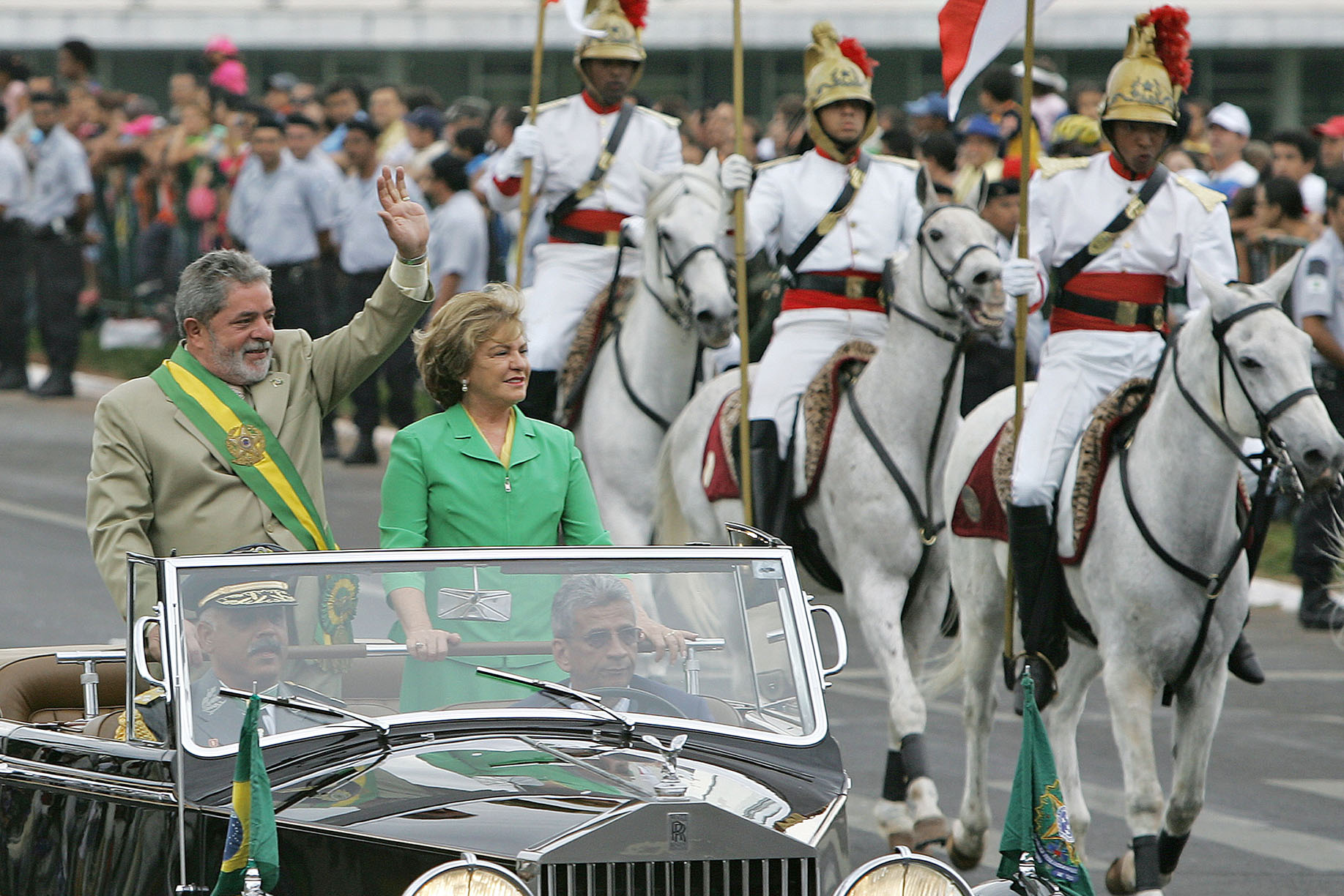
President Lula waves to the crowd with First Lady Marisa Letícia during the 2005 Independence Day military parade in Brasília

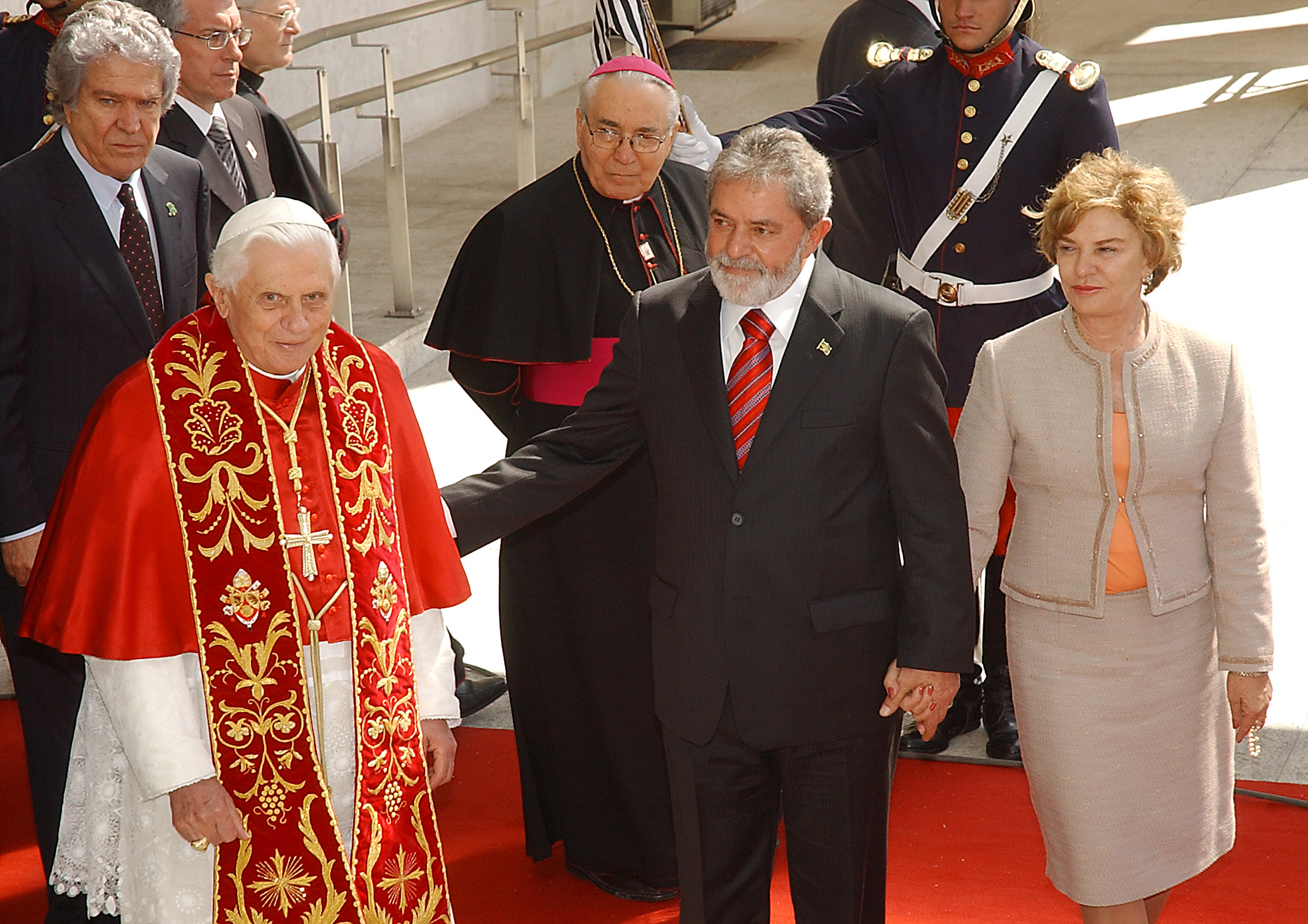
Lula and Marisa Letícia with Pope Benedict XVI in São Paulo, Brazil, 10 May 2007

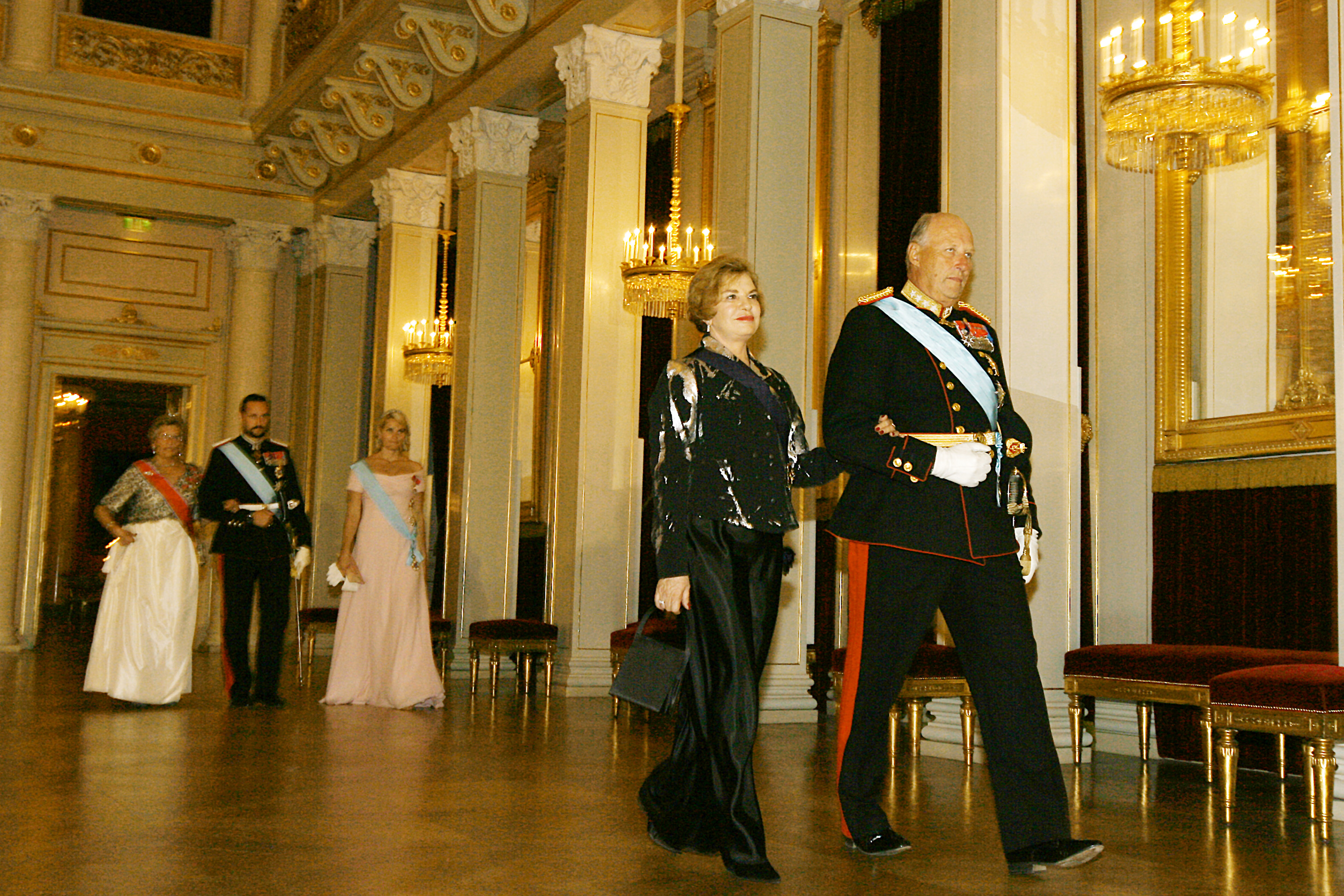
Marisa Letícia and King Harald V of Norway attend a state dinner in the Royal Palace in Oslo, Norway, 13 September 2007

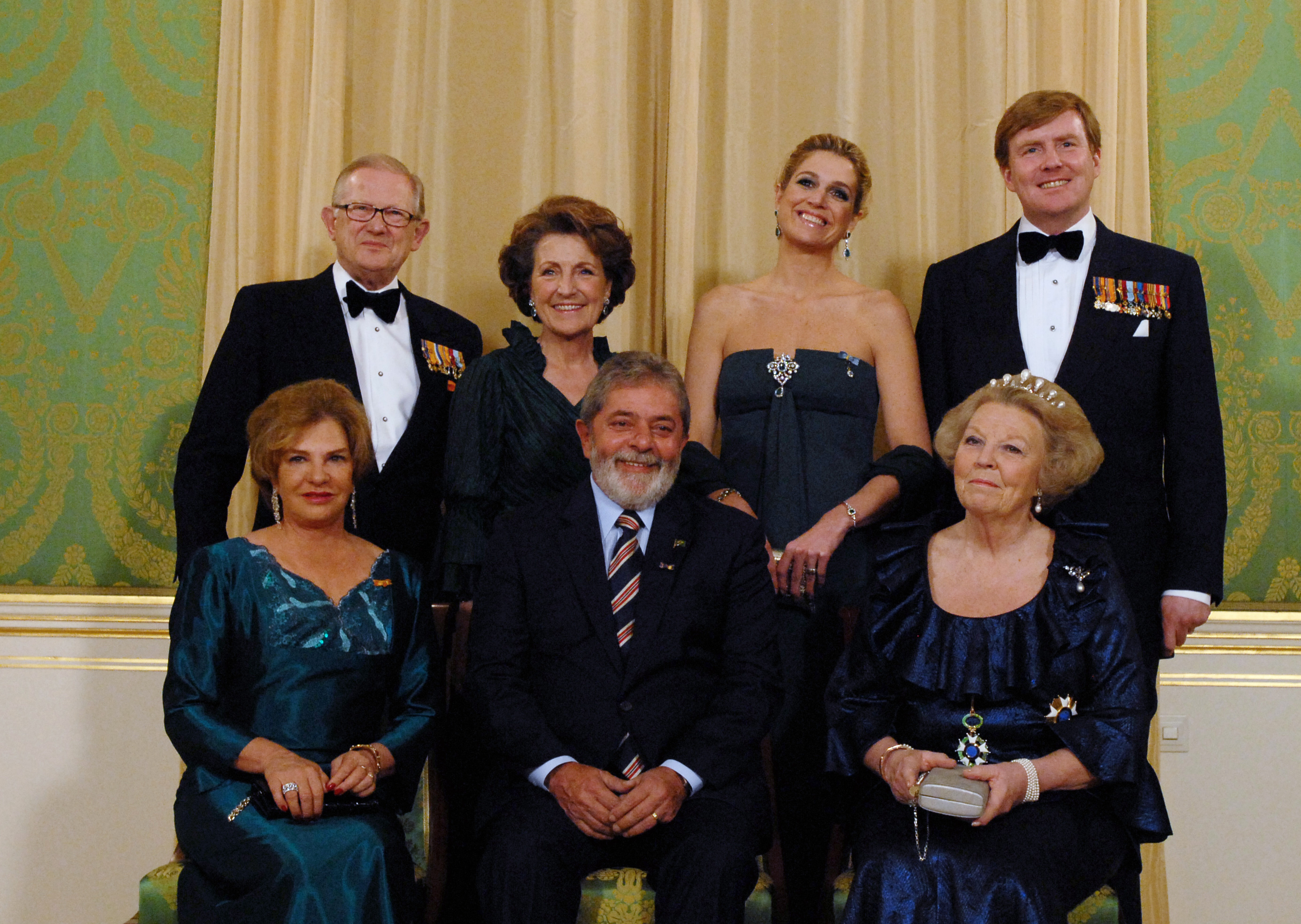
The President and First Lady pose for an official photo with the Dutch Royal Family in April 2008

Honorary titles
| Preceded by Ruth Cardoso | First Lady of Brazil; 2003–2011 | Vacant Title next held by Marcela Temer |
