= Alice Prestes =

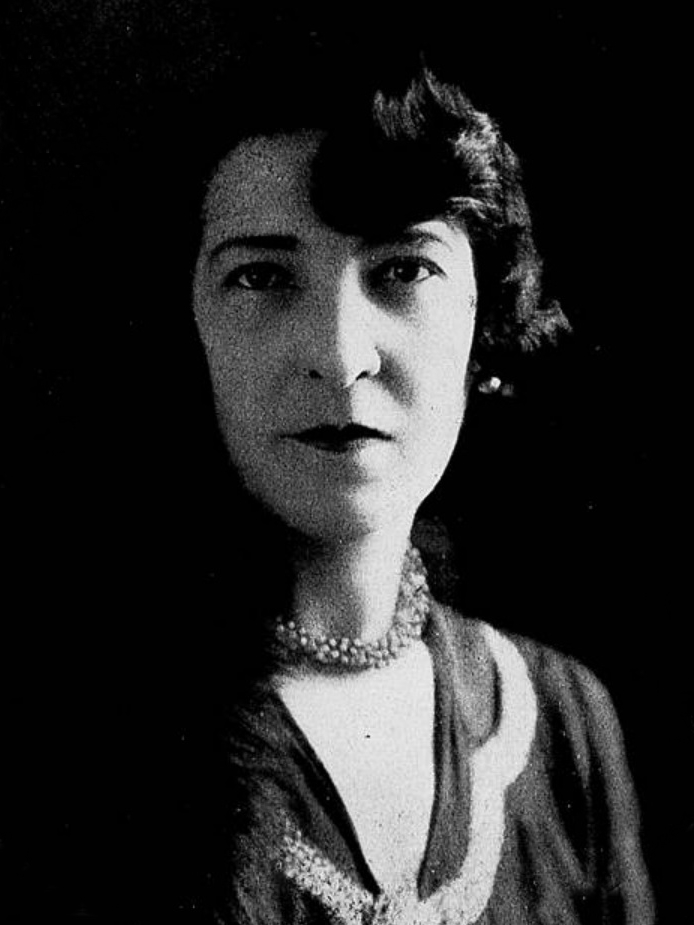

First Lady-designate of Brazil
- In role 1 March 1930 – 24 October 1930
- President: Júlio Prestes (elect)
- Preceded by: Sophia Pais de Barros
- Succeeded by: Darci Vargas

First Lady of São Paulo
- In role 17 July 1927 – 21 May 1930
- President: Júlio Prestes
- Preceded by: Lídia de Campos
- Succeeded by: Evelina Penteado

Personal details
- Born: Alice Vianna; 21 October 1887 Piracicaba, São Paulo, Brazil
- Died: 9 June 1940 (aged 52) Itapetininga, São Paulo, Brazil
- Spouse: Júlio Prestes (m. 1906)

Alice Vianna Prestes (21 October 1887 – 9 June 1940) was the wife of Júlio Prestes, President-elect of Brazil, who was impeded from taking office due to the Revolution of 1930, fact that also impeded her from officially assuming the role of First Lady of Brazil. In the state of São Paulo, she had served as First Lady from 1927 to 1930.

== Biography ==
Born in the state of São Paulo, daughter of Abílio Vianna and Maria Isabel de Barros Vianna, she married on 3 May 1906 with poet and lawyer Júlio Prestes de Albuquerque and they had 3 children: Marialice Prestes de Albuquerque, Fernando Prestes Neto and Irene Prestes da Silva.

=== Death ===
Vianna died on 9 June 1940, in Araras farm, municipality of Itapetininga, aged 52, where her body was buried in the Holy Sacrament Cemetery.

== See also ==
- First Lady of Brazil

Honorary titles
Preceded by Lídia de Campos	First Lady of São Paulo; 1927–1930	Succeeded by Evelina Penteado
Preceded by Sophia Pais de Barros	First Lady-designate of Brazil; 1930	Vacant Title next held by Darci Vargas
