= Fernando Henrique Cardoso =

President of Brazil from 1995 to 2003

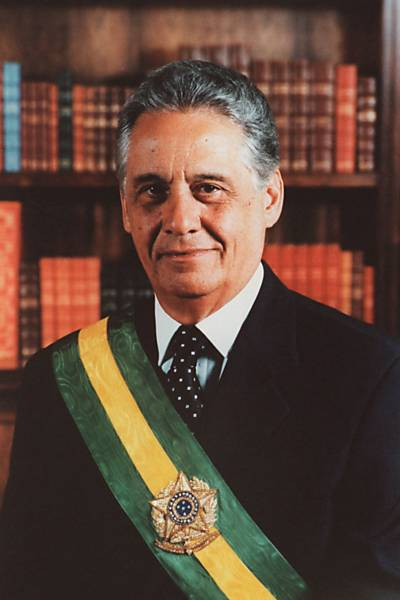
- Official portrait, 1999

34th President of Brazil
- In office 1 January 1995 – 1 January 2003
- Vice President: Marco Maciel
- Preceded by: Itamar Franco
- Succeeded by: Luiz Inácio Lula da Silva

Senator for São Paulo
- In office 4 April 1994 – 15 December 1994
- Preceded by: Eva Blay
- Succeeded by: Eva Blay
- In office 15 March 1983 – 5 October 1992
- Preceded by: Franco Montoro
- Succeeded by: Eva Blay

Minister of Finance
- In office 21 May 1993 – 5 April 1994
- President: Itamar Franco
- Preceded by: Eliseu Resende
- Succeeded by: Rubens Ricupero

Minister of Foreign Affairs
- In office 5 October 1992 – 20 May 1993
- President: Itamar Franco
- Preceded by: Celso Lafer
- Succeeded by: Celso Amorim

Personal details
- Born: 18 June 1931 (age 95) Rio de Janeiro, Federal District, Brazil
- Party: PSDB (1988–present)
- Other political affiliations: MDB (1974–1980); PMDB (1980–1988)
- Spouses: Ruth Leite (m. 1953; died 2008) Patrícia Kundrát (m. 2014)
- Children: 3
- Relatives: Pedro Cardoso (cousin)
- Education: University of São Paulo (PhD)
- Profession: Sociologist
- Website: www.ifhc.org.br

Coat of Arms

Fernando Henrique Cardoso (Brazilian Portuguese: [feʁˈnɐ̃du ẽˈʁiki kaʁˈdozu]; born 18 June 1931), also known by his initials FHC (Brazilian Portuguese: [ˌɛfjaɡaˈse]), is a Brazilian sociologist, professor, and politician who served as the 34th president of Brazil from 1 January 1995 to 1 January 2003. He was the first Brazilian president to be reelected for a subsequent term. An accomplished scholar of dependency theory noted for his research on slavery and political theory, Cardoso has earned many honors including the Prince of Asturias Award for International Cooperation (2000) and the Kluge Prize from the US Library of Congress (2012).

A native of the city of Rio de Janeiro, he moved with his family to the city of São Paulo, where, in 1953, he married anthropologist and fellow university student Ruth Vilaça Correia Leite, with whom he had three children. FHC earned a degree in Sociology from the University of São Paulo and later became a professor emeritus at the same institution. Following the 1964 military coup, he faced persecution and went into exile in Chile and France, returning to Brazil in 1968. He taught at foreign universities and built a significant academic career, producing numerous award-winning social studies. After the impeachment of Fernando Collor, he was appointed by Itamar Franco to serve as Minister of Foreign Affairs and, subsequently, Minister of Finance. In the latter role, he led the development of the Plano Real, which stabilized the economy. Bolstered by the success of this economic plan, he was elected President of the Republic in the first round of the 1994 election.

Cardoso was inaugurated as President on 1 January 1995. He continued the economic reforms that had been initiated by the previous administration, inflation rates remained low, several state-owned companies were privatized, and market liberalization increased the country's visibility in the international market. The government succeeded in passing economic and administrative laws, including one that allowed for the reelection of executive officeholders. In 1998, he won the presidential election in the first round, becoming the first president to be reelected at the time. During his second term, international crises, a significant devaluation of the Real, an energy crisis, and other events led to a significant drop in his popularity. Currently, he heads the Fernando Henrique Cardoso Foundation, which he founded in 2004, and serves on various advisory boards for different organizations abroad, such as the Clinton Global Initiative, Brown University, and the United Nations Foundation. He is also a member of The Elders, the Brazilian Academy of Letters, and the honorary president of the PSDB (Brazilian Social Democracy Party).

Cardoso was also the 10th president of the International Sociological Association (1982–1986).

== Personal and professional life ==
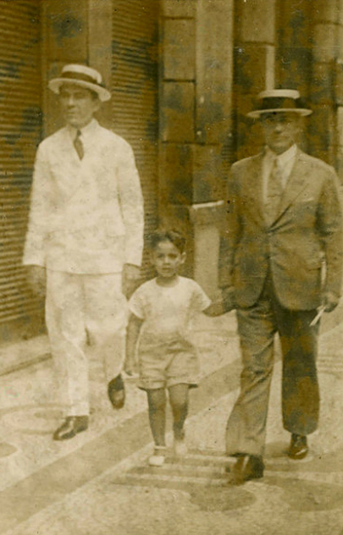
Cardoso walking hand-in-hand with his father in the 1930s

Cardoso descends from wealthy Portuguese immigrants. Some were politicians during the Empire of Brazil. He also has African ancestry, through a black great-great-grandmother and a mulatto great-grandmother. Cardoso described himself as "slightly mulatto" and allegedly said he has "a foot in the kitchen" (a nod to historical Brazilian domestic slavery).

Born in Rio de Janeiro, Cardoso lived in São Paulo for most of his life. Cardoso is a widower who was married to Ruth Vilaça Correia Leite Cardoso, an anthropologist, from 1953 until her death on 24 June 2008; they had three children. Educated as a sociologist, he was a professor of political science and sociology at the Universidade de São Paulo. and president of the International Sociological Association (ISA), from 1982 to 1986. He is a member of the Institute for Advanced Study (Princeton), an honorary foreign member of the American Academy of Arts and Sciences and has written several books.

Cardoso was also associate director of Studies in the École des hautes études en sciences sociales in Paris, then visiting professor at the Collège de France and later Paris Nanterre University. He later gave lectures at British and US universities including Cambridge University, Stanford University, Brown University and the University of California, Berkeley. He is fluent in Portuguese, English, French, and Spanish, and can express himself in Italian and German.

After his presidency, he was appointed to a five-year term (2003–2008) as professor-at-large at Brown University's Watson Institute for International Studies, where he is now on the board of overseers. Cardoso is a founding member of the University of Southern California Center on Public Diplomacy's advisory board. In February 2005, he gave the fourth annual Kissinger Lecture on Foreign Policy and International Relations at the Library of Congress, Washington DC on "Dependency and Development in Latin America.

In 2005, Cardoso was selected by the British magazine Prospect as being one of the world's top one hundred living public intellectuals.

== Academic career ==
Cardoso earned a bachelor's degree in Social Sciences from Universidade de São Paulo in 1952, from where he also earned a Master's and a Doctorate in Sociology. His doctoral thesis, under the supervision of Florestan Fernandes, examined the institution of slavery in Southern Brazil, critiquing, from a Marxist perspective, the dominant approach of Gilberto Freyre to the topic. It has since become a classic on the subject. Cardoso also received the Livre-Docência degree in 1963, the most senior level of academic recognition in Brazil, also from Universidade de São Paulo. In 1968, he received the title of Cathedratic Professor, holding the chair of Political Science at Universidade de São Paulo.

As he continued his academic career abroad in Chile and France after the tightening of the Brazilian military dictatorship, Cardoso published several books and papers on state bureaucracy, industrial elites and, particularly, dependency theory. His work on dependency would be his most acclaimed contribution to sociology and development studies, especially in the United States. After presiding the International Sociological Association from 1982 to 1986 Cardoso was selected as a Fulbright Program 40th anniversary distinguished fellow and in that capacity was a visiting scholar and lectured at Columbia University on democracy in Brazil. Cardoso currently gives speeches and classes abroad. In June 2013 he was elected as a member of Academia Brasileira de Letras. He said his election was due to recognition for his academic achievements, rather than his political career.

== Elections ==
After his return to Brazil, Fernando Henrique engaged with the burgeoning democratic opposition to the military-dominated regime both as an intellectual and as a political activist. He became Senator from São Paulo for the former Brazilian Democratic Movement (MDB) in 1982, replacing Franco Montoro, the newly elected governor of São Paulo. In 1985, he ran unsuccessfully for mayor of São Paulo against former President Jânio Quadros. Ahead in the polls, he let himself be photographed in the mayor's chair before the elections. Some attribute his loss to this episode.

Elected to the Senate in 1986 for the Party of the Brazilian Democratic Movement (PMDB), which MDB became after re-democratization, he joined a group of PMDB parliamentarians who left that party to found the Brazilian Social Democratic Party (PSDB) after previously held PMDB positions shifted to the right when the party filled with politicians who had collaborated with the dictatorship. As a senator, Cardoso took part in the 1987–1988 National Constituent Assembly that drafted and approved Brazil's current Constitution in the wake of the country's re-democratization. In the early stages of the Constituent Assembly's work (from February to March 1987), Cardoso led the committee that drafted the internal rules of procedure, including the procedural rules governing the drafting of the Constitution itself. These rules of procedure were adopted by the Assembly and published on 25 March 1987. Until 1992, Cardoso served as Leader of the PSDB in the Senate. From October 1992 to May 1993, he served as Minister of Foreign Affairs under President Itamar Franco (PMDB).

From May 1993 to April 1994, Cardoso was Minister of Finance and resigned in April 1994 to launch a presidential campaign. In the 3 October election, he won the presidency in the first round of voting with 54% of the vote, more than twice that of his nearest opponent, Luiz Inácio Lula da Silva. This is still the largest margin of victory ever recorded in a free election in Brazilian history. After the constitution was amended to allow a president to succeed himself, he won a second term almost as easily in 1998, taking 53% to Lula's 31.7% to win in a single round. To date, he is the only president to win an outright majority of the popular vote, and the only one to win the presidency in a single round since the institution of the two-round system in 1989.

Cardoso was succeeded in 2003 by Lula da Silva, who ran for the fourth time and had come in second on prior attempts. Lula won in the runoff election against the Cardoso-supported candidate, José Serra. Lula's election has been interpreted as resulting from Cardoso's low approval ratings in his second term.

== Presidency (1995–2003) ==
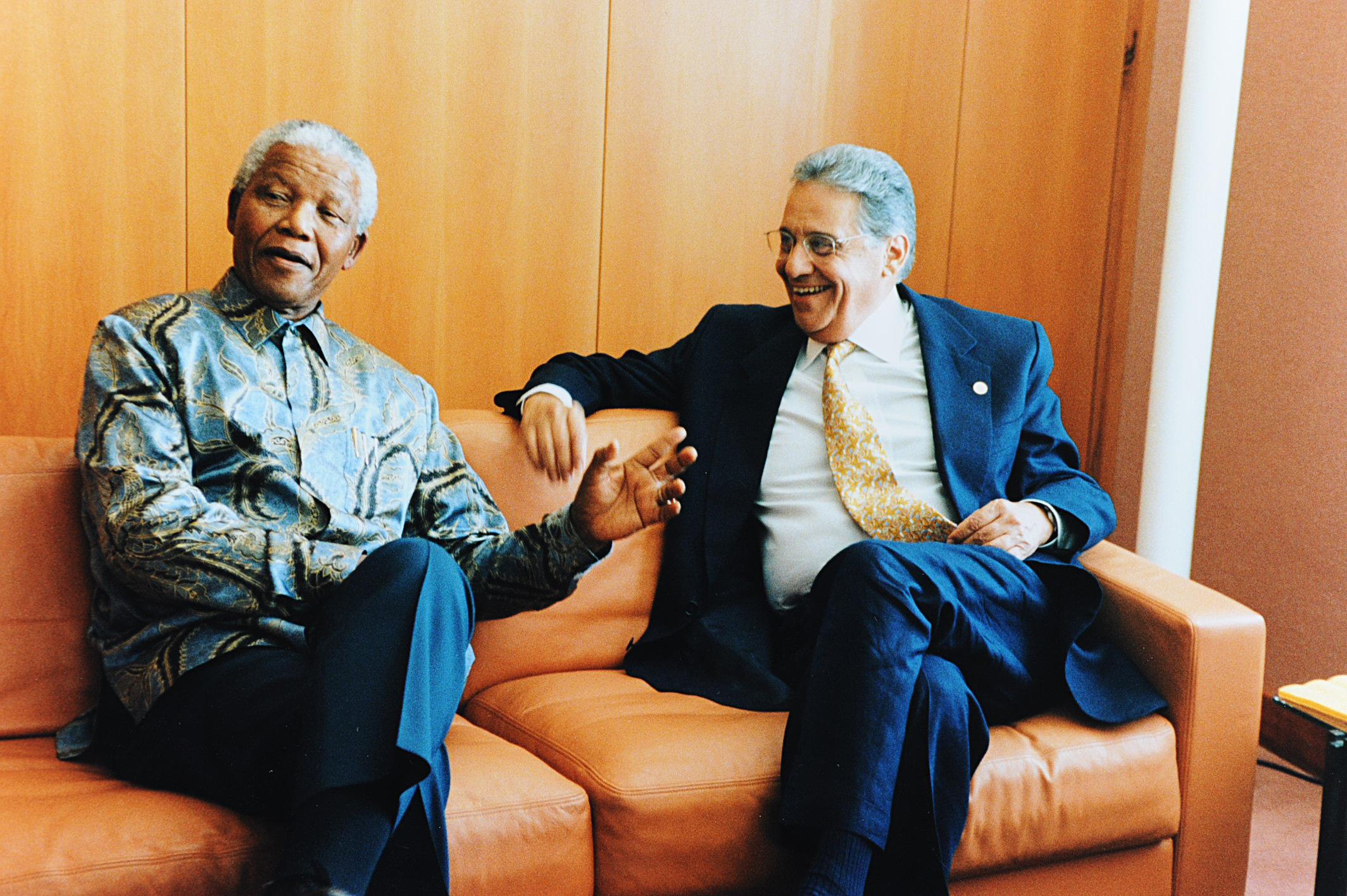
Cardoso with Nelson Mandela at the 2nd World Trade Organization Ministerial Conference in Geneva, Switzerland, 18 May 1998

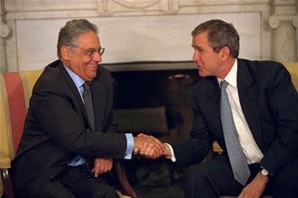
Cardoso meets with George W. Bush in the Oval Office in 2001

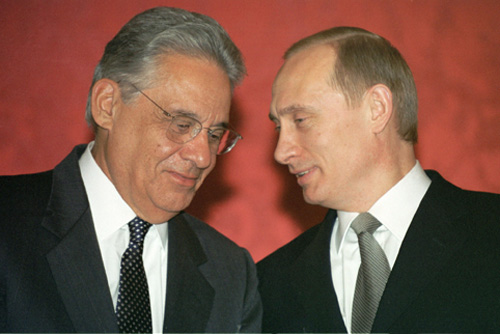
Cardoso with Russian President Vladimir Putin in Moscow in January 2002

Cardoso, often nicknamed "FHC", was elected with the support of a heterodox alliance of his own Brazilian Social Democracy Party (PSDB) and two right-wing parties, the Liberal Front Party (PFL) and the Brazilian Labour Party (PTB). Brazil's largest party, the centrist Party of the Brazilian Democratic Movement (PMDB), joined Cardoso's governing coalition after the election, as did the right-wing Brazilian Progressive Party (PPB) in 1996.

Party loyalty was not always strong, and coalition members did not always vote with the government. Cardoso had difficulty at times gaining support for some of his legislative priorities, even though his coalition held an overwhelming majority of the congressional seats. Nevertheless, many constitutional amendments were passed during his presidency.

Cardoso's presidency saw institutional advancements in human rights, beginning with a national secretariat and a new government program, discussed with civil society, to address the issue. On 8 January 1996, he issued the controversial Decree 1775, which created a framework for the clear demarcation of indigenous territories, but which, as part of the process, opened indigenous territories to counterclaims by adjacent landowners. In 2000, Cardoso demanded the disclosure of some classified military files concerning Operation Condor, a network of South American military dictatorships that kidnapped and assassinated political opponents.

FHC was the first Brazilian President to address the inequality and the enormous gap between rich and poor. He started the following programs: Bolsa Escola, the Auxílio Gás, the Bolsa Alimentação, and the Cartão Alimentação.

His wife, Ruth Cardoso, focused on unifying transfer programs aimed at helping people suffering from poverty and hunger., by means of a program based on the idea that educating the poor could help raise them out of poverty.

Cardoso's administration deepened the privatization program launched by president Fernando Collor de Mello. During his first term, several government-owned enterprises in areas such as steel milling, telecommunications and mining, such as Telebras and Companhia Vale do Rio Doce were sold to the private sector, the deepest denationalisation in Brazilian history, amidst a polarized political debate between "neoliberals" and "developmentalists". Ironically, this time Cardoso was against the latter group, generating uproar among former academic colleagues and political allies who accused him of reneging on his previous intellectual work. Economists still contend over its long-term effects; some research suggests that companies sold by the government achieved better profitability as a result of their disengagement from the state.

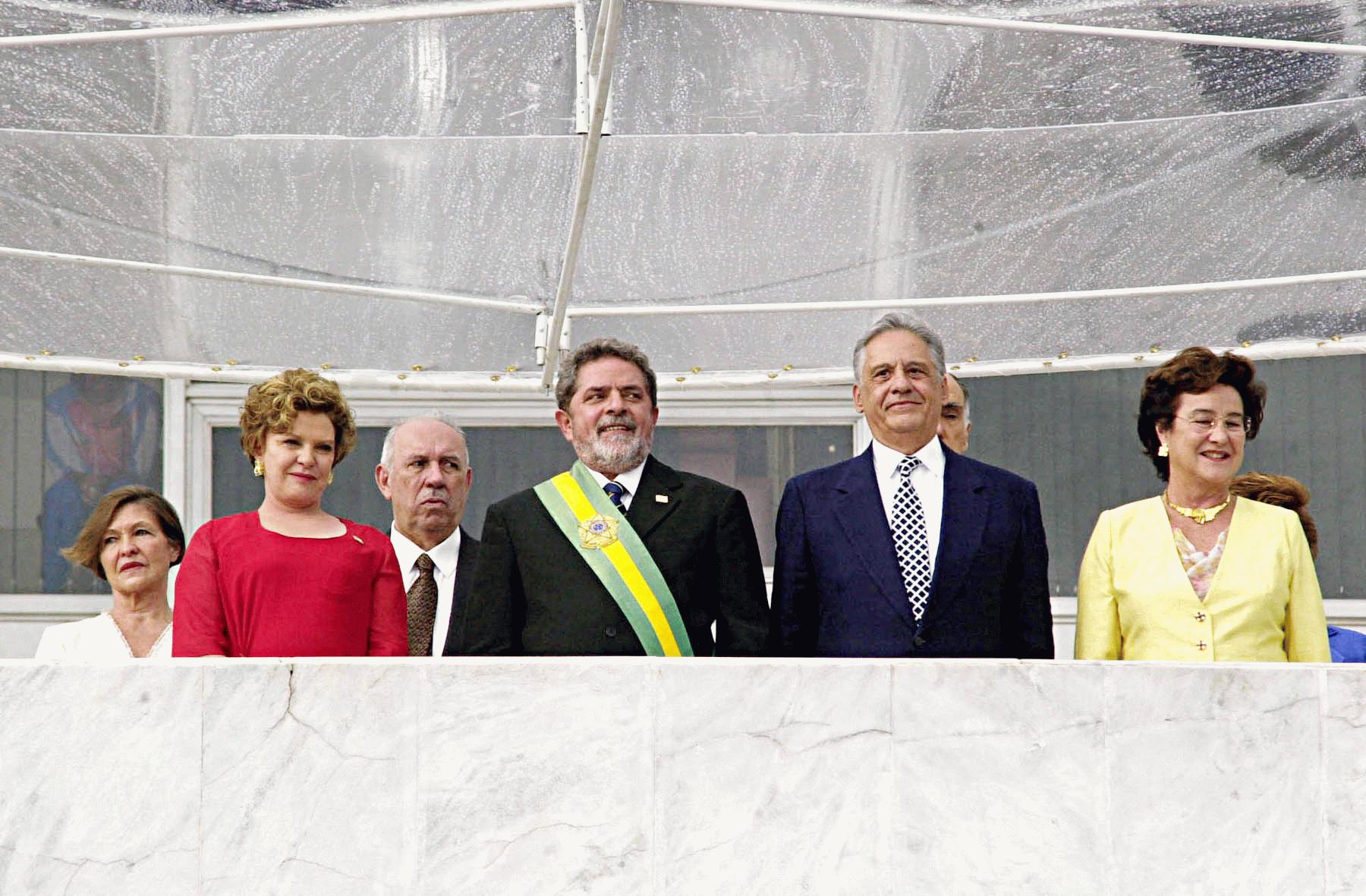
Outgoing president Cardoso, with his wife Ruth (right), at the inauguration of Luiz Inácio Lula da Silva on 1 January 2003

Despite the sale of public assets, the years 1995 to 2002 saw a rise of the total public debt from 30% to 55.5% of GDP. Economists aligned with his government argued that this was due to external factors outside the control of the administration at the time, such as the devaluation of the Brazilian real and the growth of the share of the debt denominated in US dollars. Nevertheless, devaluation of the currency was an instrument of monetary policy used right after his reelection, when the real pegged to the dollar led to a financial crisis that saw the country lose much of its foreign reserve fund and raise its interest rates on government bonds to very high levels as he tried to stabilize the currency under a new free-floating regime. With this economic shift, the greatest achievement of Cardoso – his landmark lowering of inflation – was maintained, but his popularity plummeted.

Given his previous experience as Minister of Foreign Affairs and his prestige as an internationally famous sociologist, he was respected on the world scene, building friendships with such leaders as Bill Clinton and Ernesto Zedillo. Although he was respected abroad, in Brazil he had problems gaining support in Congress for government priorities and among people in general. As a result, major reforms planned by the executive branch, such as changes in the tax system and to social security, were only partially approved and only after long discussion. Although claiming to still support social democracy, his economic policies led people on the left to identify him with neoliberalism and right-wing politics, terms that often carry a very negative connotation in Latin American political debate and academic circles. Due his mix of neoliberalism and social democracy, but also because of the friendship with Ernesto Zedillo and Bill Clinton, Cardorso is considered to be a follower of the Third Way.

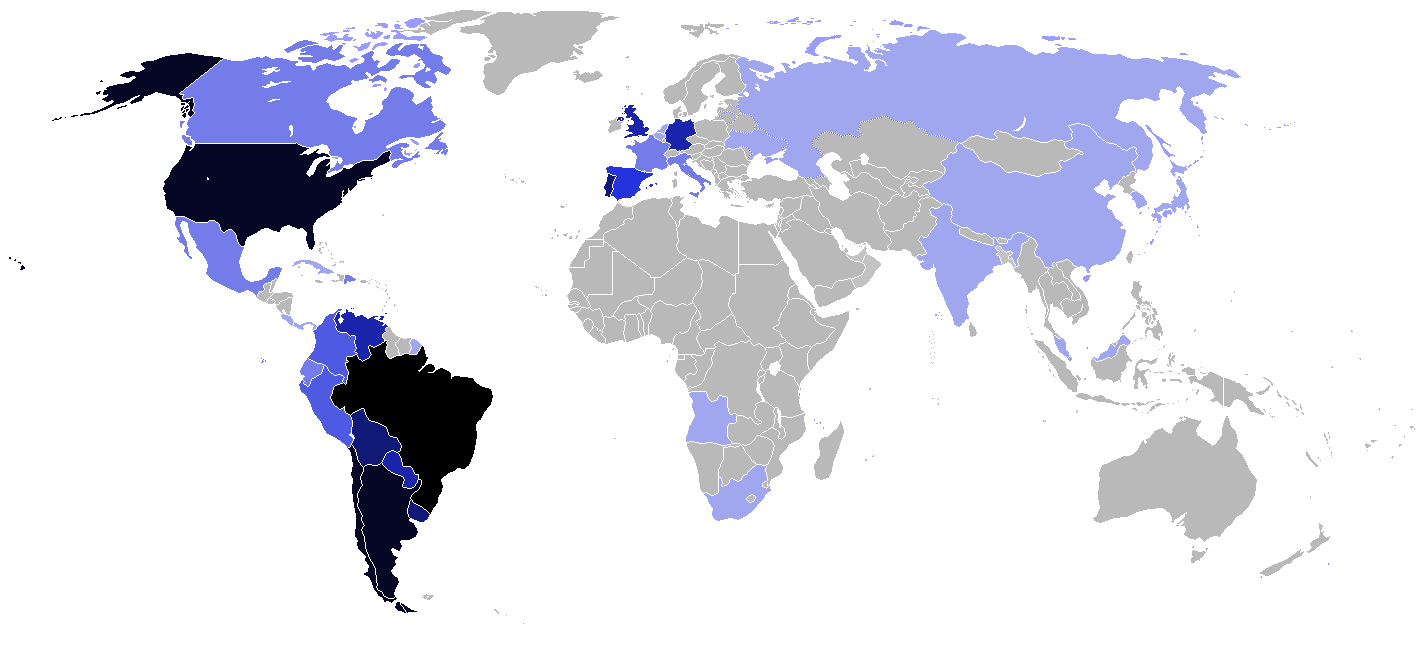
Foreign trips of Cardoso during his presidency

He also experienced personal problems with former ally Itamar Franco, his predecessor who later became Governor of Minas Gerais, a fierce opponent of his administrative reforms that saw the state lose its capacity to contract debt and forced a reduction of local government spending. Cardoso was also criticized for amending the constitution to his own benefit, allowing him to stay eight years in office. His popularity in his first four years, gained with the success of Plano Real, decreased during his last four years as the currency crisis was followed by lower economic growth and employment rates, greater public debt, growing political dissent, low levels of investment in appropriate infrastructure, and, finally, an energy crisis caused by an unexpected drought, as over 80% of Brazil's electricity is hydroelectric. He publicly admitted that he could have done more for public security and for the creation of new jobs, but defended his policies in areas such as health and education.

Cardoso's administration was accused of bribing congressmen to pass a constitutional amendment that secured FHC the right to seek reelection, which he eventually won.

President Fernando Henrique Cardoso dissolved the RFFSA, in concession, which began in 1996. The rail concession program started as Malha Oeste, the first railway concession awarded to the private sector during the privatization of Brazil’s former federal rail company RFFSA, reached the end of its 30-year contract on Tuesday, 30 June 2026.

He dissolved the ship cargo company Lloyd Brasileiro in October 1997 during his government as president.

== Post-presidency ==
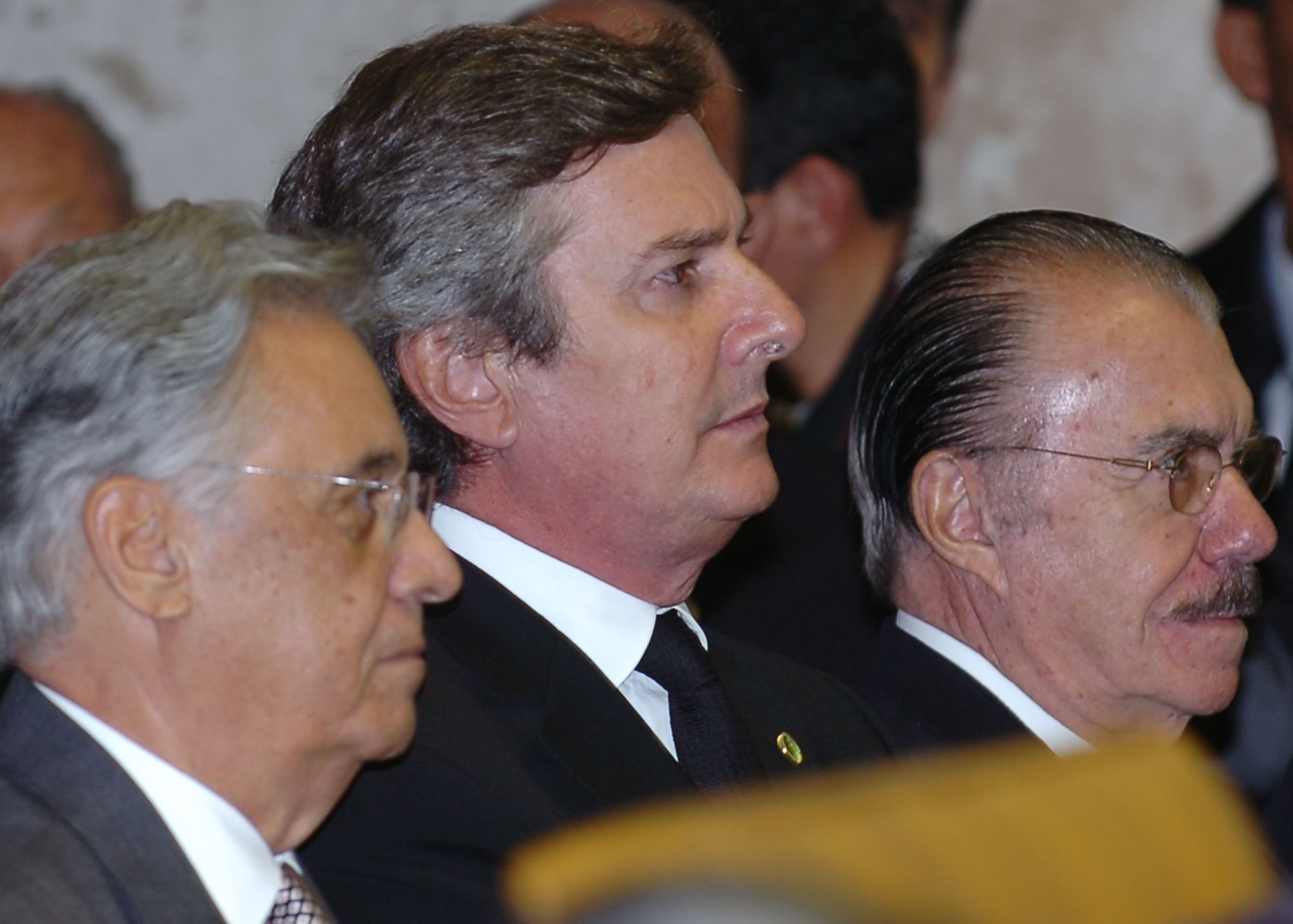
Former presidents (from right), Sarney, Collor and Cardoso, April 2008

After stepping down from office, he assumed a position as a senior leader of his party and leading public voice in the opposition to the incumbent Workers' Party, writing extensively on Brazilian politics for newspapers and giving lectures and interviews. Nevertheless, his relatively low popularity rates among the general population have made his legacy a mixed blessing to his political allies, who are somewhat reluctant to embrace it wholeheartedly during elections, especially on topics regarding privatization and social policy. In 2006, he helped the campaign of the PSDB candidate for the Presidency, Geraldo Alckmin, and has reiterated that he does not wish to run for office again.

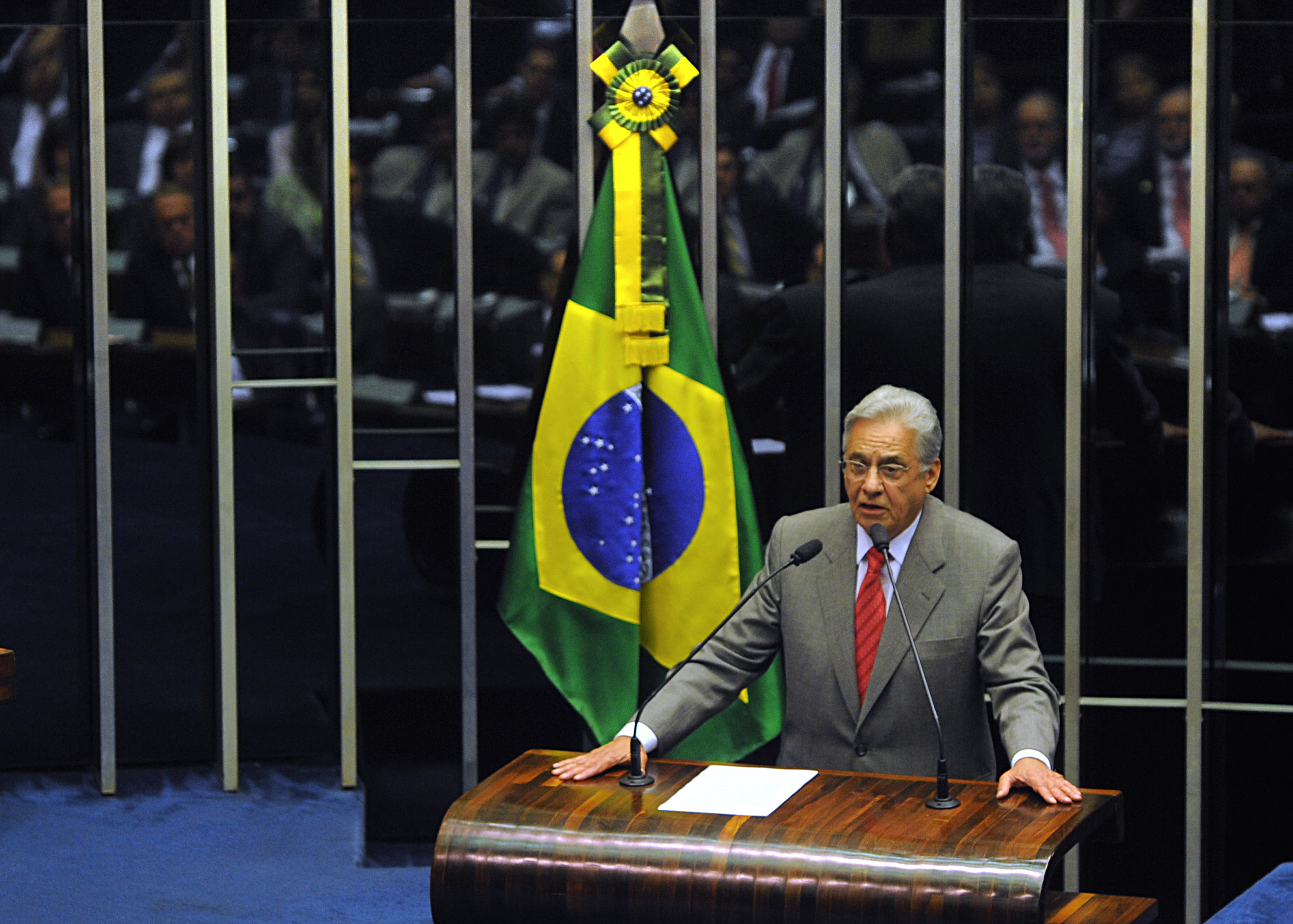
Cardoso speaks at the National Congress during a ceremony to mark the 15th anniversary of the Real Plan in July 2009

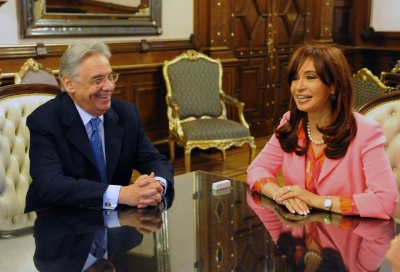
Former President Cardoso and then-President of Argentina Cristina Kirchner in the Casa Rosada, Buenos Aires, 3 December 2009

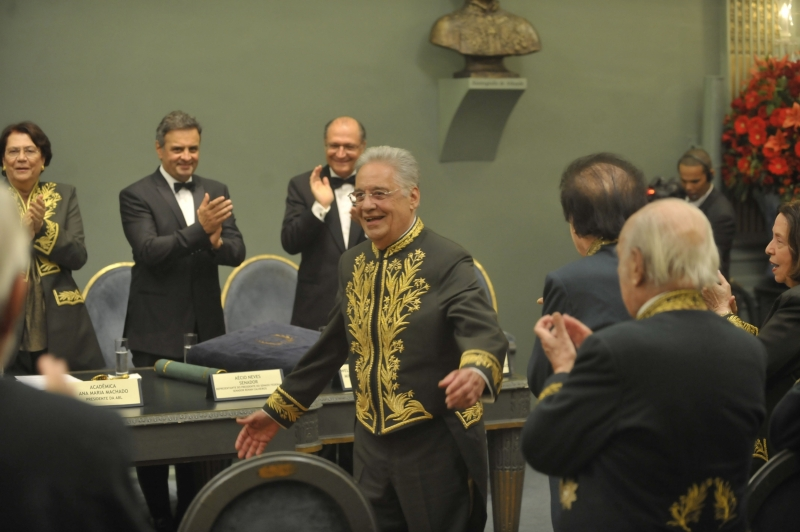
Cardoso during his induction ceremony at the Brazilian Academy of Letters, 10 September 2013

He dedicates his time to a personal institute which he founded in São Paulo, based on the model of bodies created by former presidents of the United States, has written two books about his experience as president of Brazil and advocates for relaxation of criminal laws relating to drugs, generating both criticism and praise. He lectures at Brown University about Brazilian economic policy, urban development, and deforestation and has taught as a guest lecturer at Sciences Po in Paris. Also, in 2007 he became a member of the editorial board of the Latin American policy publication Americas Quarterly, for which he is an occasional contributor.

Since leaving the Brazilian presidency, Cardoso has been involved in a number of international organisations and initiatives. He is a member of the Club of Madrid and was its president from 2003 to 2006. He has been a member of the Fondation Chirac's honour committee, ever since the Foundation was launched in 2008 by former French president Jacques Chirac to promote world peace. Cardoso is a founding member of Washington D.C.–based think tank The Inter-American Dialogue as well as former chair of the organization's board. He is also a former director of World Resources Institute.

Cardoso has a particular interest in drug policy. He served on the Latin American Commission on Drugs and Democracy and later chaired the Global Commission on Drug Policy. He appeared as an interviewee in 2011 documentary Breaking the Taboo, which explores the conclusion reached by the Global Commission on Drug Policy in 2011 that drug liberalization is the best approach in dealing with drug policy.

Cardoso is also a member of The Elders, a group of independent global leaders who work together on peace and human rights issues. In August 2009, he travelled to Israel and the West Bank as the head of an Elders delegation that also included Ela Bhatt, Gro Harlem Brundtland, Jimmy Carter, Mary Robinson and Desmond Tutu.

In 2013 he became a member of the Brazilian Academy of Letters.

In 2017, Cardoso received the Distinguished Lifetime Achievement Award from the Inter-American Dialogue.

In the 2022 presidential election, Cardoso endorsed his former Workers' Party rival Lula over then-incumbent Jair Bolsonaro.

=== Health ===
In April 2026, Fernando Henrique Cardoso was placed under guardianship following a diagnosis of advanced Alzheimer's disease. His son, Paulo Henrique Cardoso, was appointed interim guardian, authorizing him to manage his father’s assets and finances, a role he had already been performing under a power of attorney.

== Electoral history ==
Election	Party	Office	Coalition	Running mate	First round		Result
Election	Party	Office	Coalition	Running mate	Votes	%	Result
1978 Brazilian Senate election	MDB	Senator	—N/a	—N/a	1,272,416	18.14	Lost
1985 São Paulo mayoral election	PMDB	Mayor	—N/a	Caio Pompeu de Toledo	1,431,175	35.80	Lost
1986 Brazilian Senate election	PMDB	Senator	—N/a	—N/a	6,223,995	26.20	Elected
1994 Brazilian presidential election	PSDB	President	Union, Work and Progress (PSDB, PFL, PTB)	Marco Maciel (PFL)	34,364,961	54.28	Elected
1998 Brazilian presidential election	PSDB	President	Union, Work and Progress (PSDB, PFL, PTB, PP, PSD)	Marco Maciel (PFL)	35,922,692	53.06	Re-elected

== Honours ==
=== Foreign honours ===
- Argentina: Collar of the Order of the Liberator General San Martín
- Bolivia: Collar of the Order of the Condor of the Andes
- Chile: Collar of the Order of Merit (Chile)
- Colombia: Collar of the Order of Boyacá
- Costa Rica: Gran Cross of the Order of Juan Mora Fernández
- Denmark: Knight of the Order of the Elephant
- Ecuador: Collar of the National Order of Merit (Ecuador)
- Finland: Gran Cross with Collar of the Order of the White Rose of Finland
- France:
  - Gran Cross of the Legion of Honour
  - Officier of the Ordre des Palmes académiques
- Germany: Grand Cross Special Class of the Order of Merit of the Federal Republic of Germany
- Hungary: Grand Cross with Chain of the Hungarian Order of Merit
- Italy: Collar of the Order of Merit of the Italian Republic (1995)
- Japan: Grand Cordon of the Order of the Chrysanthemum
- KSA: Collar of the Order of King Abdulaziz
- Malaysia: Honorary Recipient of the Order of the Crown of the Realm (1995)
- Mexico: Collar of the Order of the Aztec Eagle
- Panama: Gran Cross of the Order of Manuel Amador Guerrero
- Paraguay: Gran Cross of the National Order of Merit (Paraguay)
- Peru:
  - Grand Cross with diamonds of the Order of the Sun of Peru
  - Gran Cross of the National Order of Merit
- Portugal:
  - Collar of the Order of Prince Henry (2000)
  - Collar of the Order of Liberty (1995)
  - Grand Cross of the Order of Merit (1987)
  - Collar of the Military Order of Saint James of the Sword (1997)
  - Grand Cross of the Order of the Tower and Sword (2002)
- Poland:
  - Order of the White Eagle (2002)
  - Grand Cross of the Order of Merit of the Republic of Poland (1995)
- Romania: Order of the Star of Romania
- South Africa: Gran Cross of the Order of Good Hope
- South Korea: Grand Order of Mugunghwa
- Spain: Collar of the Order of Isabella the Catholic (1998)
- Slovakia: Grand Cross (or 1st Class) of the Order of the White Double Cross (2001)
- Suriname: Grand Cross of the Honorary Order of the Yellow Star
- Ukraine: First Class of the Order of Prince Yaroslav the Wise
- Uruguay: Medal of the Oriental Republic of Uruguay (1995)
- United Kingdom: Honorary Knight Grand Cross of the Order of the Bath (1997)
- United States: Kluge Prize, 2012
- Venezuela:
  - Collar of the Order of the Liberator
  - Gran Cross of the Order of Francisco de Miranda

=== Honorary doctorate ===
- 1978 Honorary Doctor of Laws, Rutgers University
- 2001 Honorary Doctor of Law, Hebrew University of Jerusalem (awarded in São Paulo on 11/18)
- 2002 Honorary Doctor of Science, Constantine the Philosopher University in Nitra
- 2012 Honorary Doctor of Sociology, ISCTE-IUL, Portugal
- 2016 Honorary Doctor of Laws, Harvard University (awarded in Cambridge, Massachusetts, on 26 May 2016).
- 2021 Honorary Doctor of Science, University of Bath

== Selected works ==
- Cardoso, Fernando Henrique (2006) The Accidental President of Brazil, PublicAffairs, ISBN 1-58648-324-2
- Cardoso, Fernando Henrique (2001) Charting a New Course: The Politics of Globalization and Social Transformation, Rowman & Littlefield, ISBN 0-7425-0893-5
- Goertzel, Ted G. (1999) Fernando Henrique Cardoso: Reinventing Democracy in Brazil, Boulder: Lynne Rienner.
- Cardoso, Fernando Henrique and Faletto, Enzo (1979) "Dependency and Development in Latin America", University of California Press, ISBN 0-520-03193-8

== See also ==
- List of presidents of Brazil

Professional and academic associations
Preceded by Ulf Himmelstrand	Vice President of the International Sociological Association; 1978–1982	Succeeded by Margaret Archer
Preceded by Ulf Himmelstrand	President of the International Sociological Association; 1982–1986	Succeeded by Margaret Archer
Government offices
Preceded by Cândido Procópio Ferreira	Chair of the Brazilian Centre of Analysis and Planning; 1980–1983	Succeeded by José Arthur Giannotti
Party political offices
New political party	Joint President of PSDB; 1988–1989; Served alongside: Mário Covas, Franco Montoro and José Richa	Succeeded by Franco Montoro
Preceded by Mário Covas	PSDB nominee for President of Brazil; 1994, 1998	Succeeded by José Serra
Political offices
Preceded by Celso Lafer	Minister of Foreign Affairs; 1992–1993	Succeeded by Celso Amorim
Preceded by Eliseu Resende	Minister of Finance; 1993–1995	Succeeded by Rubens Ricupero
Preceded by Itamar Franco	President of Brazil; 1995–2003	Succeeded by Luiz Inácio Lula da Silva
Honorary titles
New title	Honorary President of PSDB; 2001–present	Incumbent
Academic offices
Preceded by João de Scantimburgo	6th academic of the 36th chair of the Brazilian Academy of Letters; 2013–present	Incumbent
