= 1930 Brazilian general election =

- 1 March 1930
- Presidential election
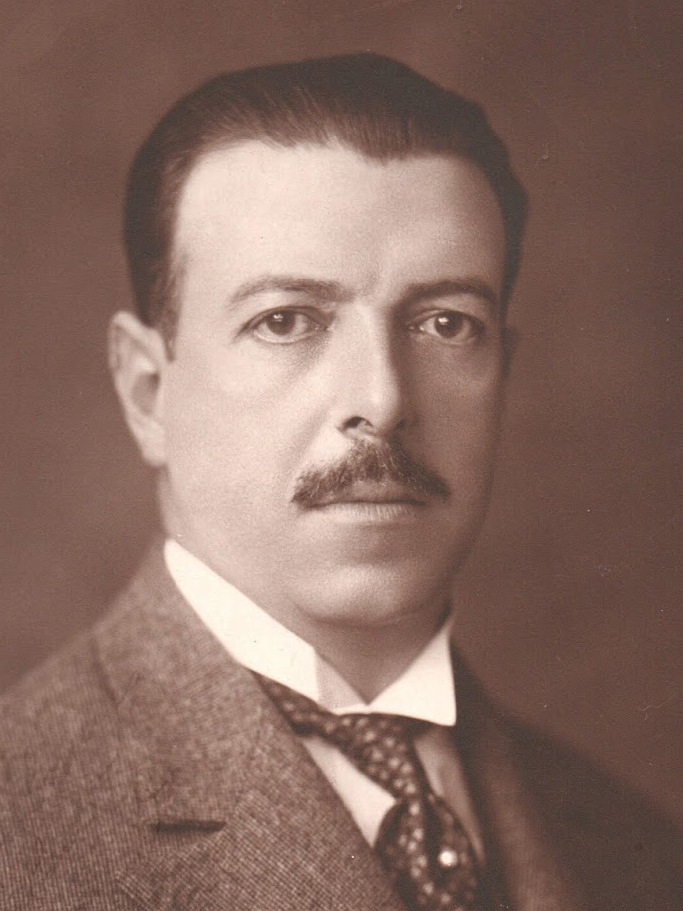

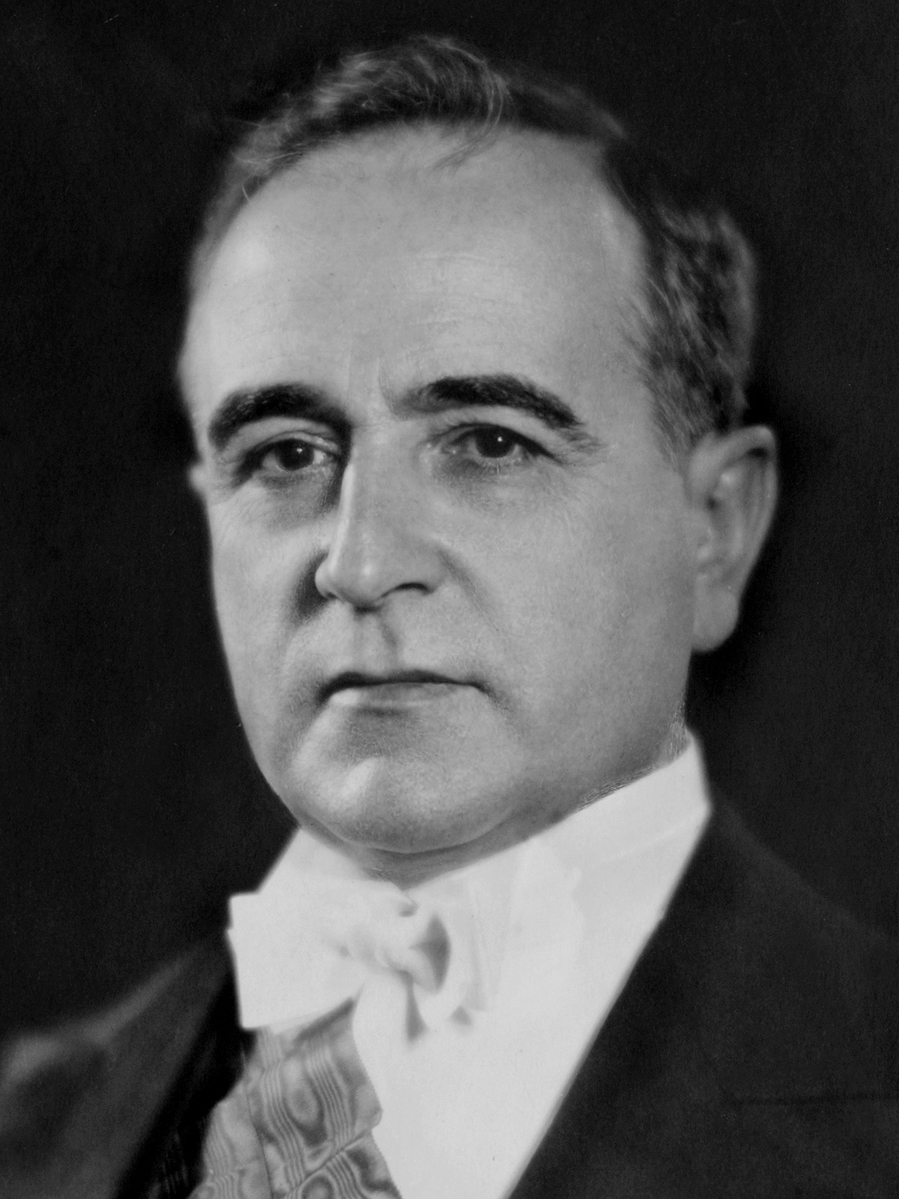
Nominee	Júlio Prestes	Getúlio Vargas
Party	PRP	AL
Popular vote	1,091,709	742,794
Percentage	57.68%	39.25%
- Results by state
President before election
Washington Luís
PRP
Elected President
Júlio Prestes
PRP
(did not take office)

General elections were held in Brazil on 1 March 1930. In the presidential elections the result was a victory for Júlio Prestes of the Paulista Republican Party, who received 58% of the vote. However, Prestes was unable to take office due to the Revolution of 1930 and Getúlio Vargas was named interim president.

== Results ==
=== President ===
Candidate	Party	Votes	%
Júlio Prestes	Paulista Republican Party	1,091,709	57.68
Getúlio Vargas	Liberal Alliance	742,794	39.25
Other candidates		58,074	3.07
Total		1,892,577	100.00
Source: Nohlen

=== Chamber of Deputies ===
Party or alliance		Votes	%	Seats
Conservative Coalition	Paulista Republican Party			22
Conservative Coalition	Republican Party of Bahia			21
Conservative Coalition	Republican Party of Pernambuco			17
Conservative Coalition	Fluminense Republican Party			14
Conservative Coalition	Conservative Coalition (Minas Gerais)			13
Conservative Coalition	Cearense Conservative Republican Party			6
Conservative Coalition	Federal Republican Party (Pará)			6
Conservative Coalition	Democratic Party (Alagoas)			6
Conservative Coalition	Republican Party (Maranhão)			5
Conservative Coalition	Democratic Republican Party (Ceará)			4
Conservative Coalition	Amazonense Republican Party			4
Conservative Coalition	Republican Party of the State of Espírito Santo			4
Conservative Coalition	Democratic Party (Goiás)			4
Conservative Coalition	Matogrossense Democratic Party			4
Conservative Coalition	Supporters of João Suassuna			4
Conservative Coalition	Paranaense Republican Party			4
Conservative Coalition	Federal Republican Party (Rio Grande do Norte)			4
Conservative Coalition	Sergipano Republican Party			4
Conservative Coalition	Piauhyense Republican Party			3
Conservative Coalition	Catarinense Republican Party			3
Conservative Coalition	Federal Republican Party (Maranhão)			2
Conservative Coalition	Conservative Republican Party (Pará)			1
Liberal Alliance	Mineiro Republican Party			24
Liberal Alliance	Riograndese Republican Party			11
Liberal Alliance	Liberator Party			5
Liberal Alliance	Liberal Alliance			4
Liberal Alliance	Republican Party of Rio de Janeiro			2
Liberal Alliance	Democratic Party (Bahia)			1
Independent				10
Total				212
Total votes		1,900,256	–	
Registered voters/turnout		2,941,807	64.59	
Source: Almanaque de Dados Eleitorais: Primeira República

== Aftermath ==
Prestes never took office as he was overthrown by the Brazilian Revolution on 24 October. The revolution was led by Vargas, an opponent of the oligarchic rule shared between the states of São Paulo and Minas Gerais (known as the café com leite system). Vargas became President of Brazil, ruling until 1945.
