= Júlio Prestes =

President-elect of Brazil in 1930

President-elect of Brazil
- In role 1 March 1930 – 24 October 1930
- Vice President: Vital Soares (elect)
- Preceded by: Washington Luís (1926)
- Succeeded by: Getúlio Vargas (1934)
Executive offices
President of São Paulo
In office 17 July 1927 – 21 May 1930
Vice President	Heitor Penteado
Preceded by	Carlos de Campos
Succeeded by	Heitor Penteado
Legislative offices
Member of the Chamber of Deputies
In office 14 May 1923 – 14 July 1927
Constituency	São Paulo
State Deputy of São Paulo
In office 7 April 1909 – 7 April 1923
Constituency	At-large

Personal details
- Born: Júlio Prestes de Albuquerque; 15 March 1882 Itapetininga, São Paulo, Empire of Brazil
- Died: 9 February 1946 (aged 63) São Paulo, Brazil
- Party: PRP (1909–37); UDN (1945–46)
- Spouse: Alice Vianna (m. 1906; died 1940)
- Children: Marialice; Fernando Neto; Irene
- Profession: Lawyer, landowner

Júlio Prestes de Albuquerque (Portuguese pronunciation: [ˈʒulju ˈpɾɛstʃiz dʒi awbuˈkɛʁki]; 15 March 1882 – 9 February 1946) was a Brazilian poet, lawyer and politician. He was the last elected President of Brazil of the period known as the Old Republic, but never took office because the government was overthrown in the Revolution of 1930. Prestes was the only politician to be elected President of Brazil and then impeded from taking office.

== Career ==
Prestes graduated with a law degree from the Law School of São Paulo (today the Faculty of Law of the University of São Paulo) in 1906. He married Alice Viana and had three children with her.

He started his political career in 1909, when he was elected State Representative in São Paulo by the Republican Party of São Paulo (PRP). He was re-elected several times until 1923, and became noted for his defense of public employees in São Paulo.

As a State Representative, he introduced legislation that created the Court of Auditors of São Paulo and the Faculty of Veterinary Medicine and Zootechnology of the University of São Paulo. He was the author of the law that incorporated the Sorocabana Railroad in the São Paulo State patrimony.

In the São Paulo Revolt of 1924, Prestes fought on the Coluna Sul, with Ataliba Leonel and Washington Luís, expelling the rebels of the region of Sorocaba. That same year he was elected to the Chamber of Deputies.

After the death of then state president Carlos de Campos on 27 April 1927, and the resignation of the state vice president Fernando Prestes de Albuquerque, new elections for the office were held and won by Prestes. He was the thirteenth elected president of the state of São Paulo, serving from 17 July 1927 to 21 May 1930, and was succeeded by his vice-president Heitor Penteado due to Prestes' candidacy for the presidency of the Republic.

The jingle used by his campaign.

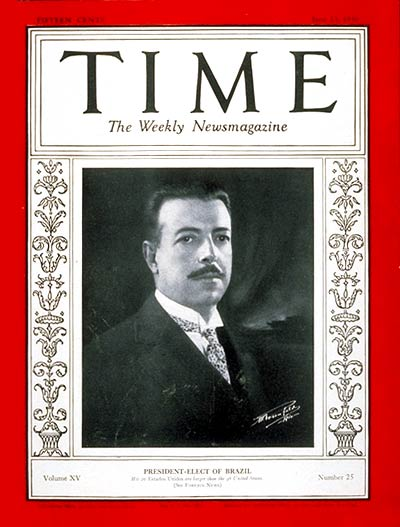
The cover of TIME Magazine in question.

Prestes was elected president of Brazil on 1 March 1930. He also became the second Brazilian featured on the cover of Time magazine. He was also the last person born in São Paulo to be elected president until the election of Jair Bolsonaro in 2018.

Prestes would ultimately never took office, because Washington Luís, the then-president of Brazil, was overthrown on 24 October by the Revolution of 1930. Getúlio Vargas, the runner-up in that election, would take office instead, ruling until 1945.

Prestes died on 9 February 1946, in São Paulo, at the age of 63.

Political offices
Preceded by Carlos de Campos	President of São Paulo; 1927–1930	Succeeded by Pedro Manuel de Toledo
Preceded by Washington Luís	President-elect of Brazil; 1930	Succeeded by Military Junta (interim)
