= First Lady of Brazil =

Hostess of the Palácio da Alvorada, usually the president's wife

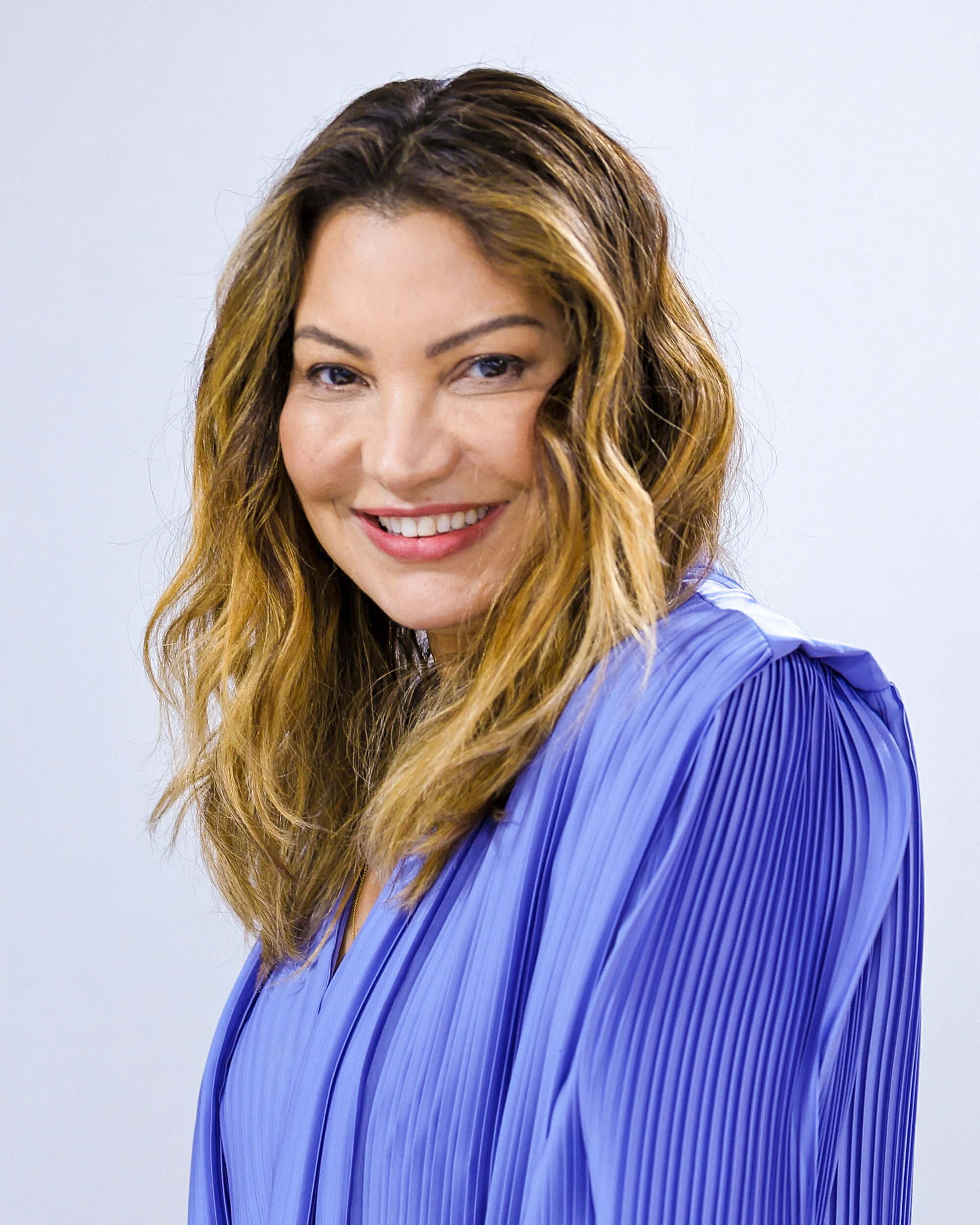
- Current; Rosângela Lula da Silva since 1 January 2023
- Style: Dona
- Residence: Palácio da Alvorada
- Inaugural holder: Mariana da Fonseca
- Formation: 15 November 1889 (136 years ago)

First Lady of Brazil (Portuguese: Primeira-dama do Brasil) is a title given to the hostess of Alvorada Palace. The position is traditionally filled by the wife of the current president of Brazil, but may apply to women who are not the president's wives, for instance, when the president is single or widowed. They do not have official functions within the government, but usually attend public ceremonies and organize social actions such as charity events. In addition, a charismatic first lady can help convey a positive image of her spouses to the population.

The role of the first lady has changed considerably. It has come to include involvement in political campaigns, social causes, and representation of the president on official and ceremonial occasions. In addition, over the years, first ladies have exerted influence in various sectors, from fashion to public opinion on politics.

To date, there have been thirty-seven first ladies, counting twice the wives of Getúlio Vargas and Ranieri Mazzilli, who served two non-consecutive terms each. President Hermes da Fonseca had two first ladies, as he became a widower and remarried while still in office. Presidents Rodrigues Alves and Castelo Branco were widowers, hence their daughters played such a role. Brazil has never had a first gentleman, as every male president has been heterosexual and Dilma Rousseff, the first and only female president to date, had been divorced prior to taking office. President Luiz Inácio Lula da Silva had different first ladies, his second wife Marisa Letícia Lula da Silva served during her husband's first presidency until her own death in 2017, while his third wife Rosângela Lula da Silva assumed the first lady role upon her husband's second non-consecutive presidency.

Following the inauguration of Lula on 1 January 2023, Rosângela Lula da Silva became the thirty-seventh Brazilian first lady, succeeding Michelle Bolsonaro, wife of former president Jair Bolsonaro.

== Wives who did not become first ladies ==
- Alice Prestes, Júlio Prestes's wife, did not officially become First Lady, as her husband was prevented from taking office, but he must be a former president under the law.
- Mariquita Aleixo, Pedro Aleixo's wife, did not officially become First Lady, as her husband was prevented from taking office, but he must be a former president under the law.
- Risoleta Neves, Tancredo Neves's wife, did not officially become First Lady, as her husband was already ill prior to his scheduled inauguration before his eventual death, but he must be a former president under the law.

== Social works ==
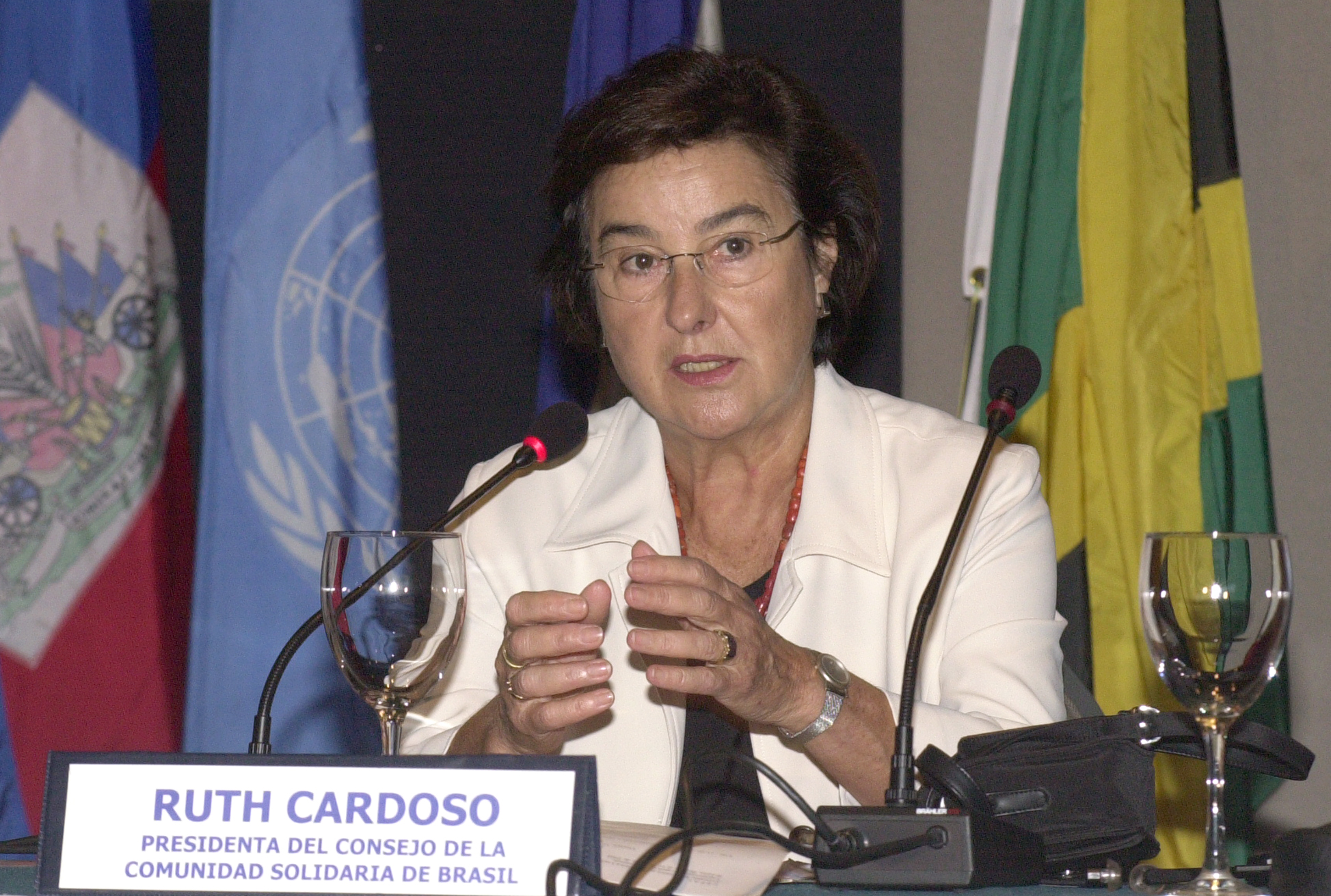
Ruth Cardoso in event of the Solidarity Community Program.

The first ladies occupy a highly visible position in Brazilian society, playing an evolutionary role over the centuries.

Assistance in the country under the command of the Brazilian first lady began in the 1940s, ahead of Darcy Vargas, with the creation of the Brazilian Legion of Assistance. Founded on 28 August 1942 to assist the families of soldiers who participated in World War II, but soon became comprehensive, with emphasis on mothers and families living in poverty. With an entirely feminine style, the LBA was governed in each state by the wives of the governors and, consequently, by the wives of the mayors. From then on, all the first ladies of the country assumed the presidency of honor of the Brazilian Legion of Assistance. But it was under Rosane Collor's management that the LBA plunged into scandals over embezzlement for the first lady's family, which resulted in her leaving the organ in 1991. The Brazilian Legion of Assistance was extinguished on 1 January 1995, under the government of Fernando Henrique Cardoso.

Sarah Kubitschek innovated with the Foundation of Social Pioneers. The organization was created when it was still first lady of Minas Gerais, offering support to children, mothers and pregnant women, extending to the poorest families. The foundation gained independence when her husband assumed the Presidency of the Republic, acquiring larger resources, originating from the federal government and some sectors such as: commerce, industry and individuals.

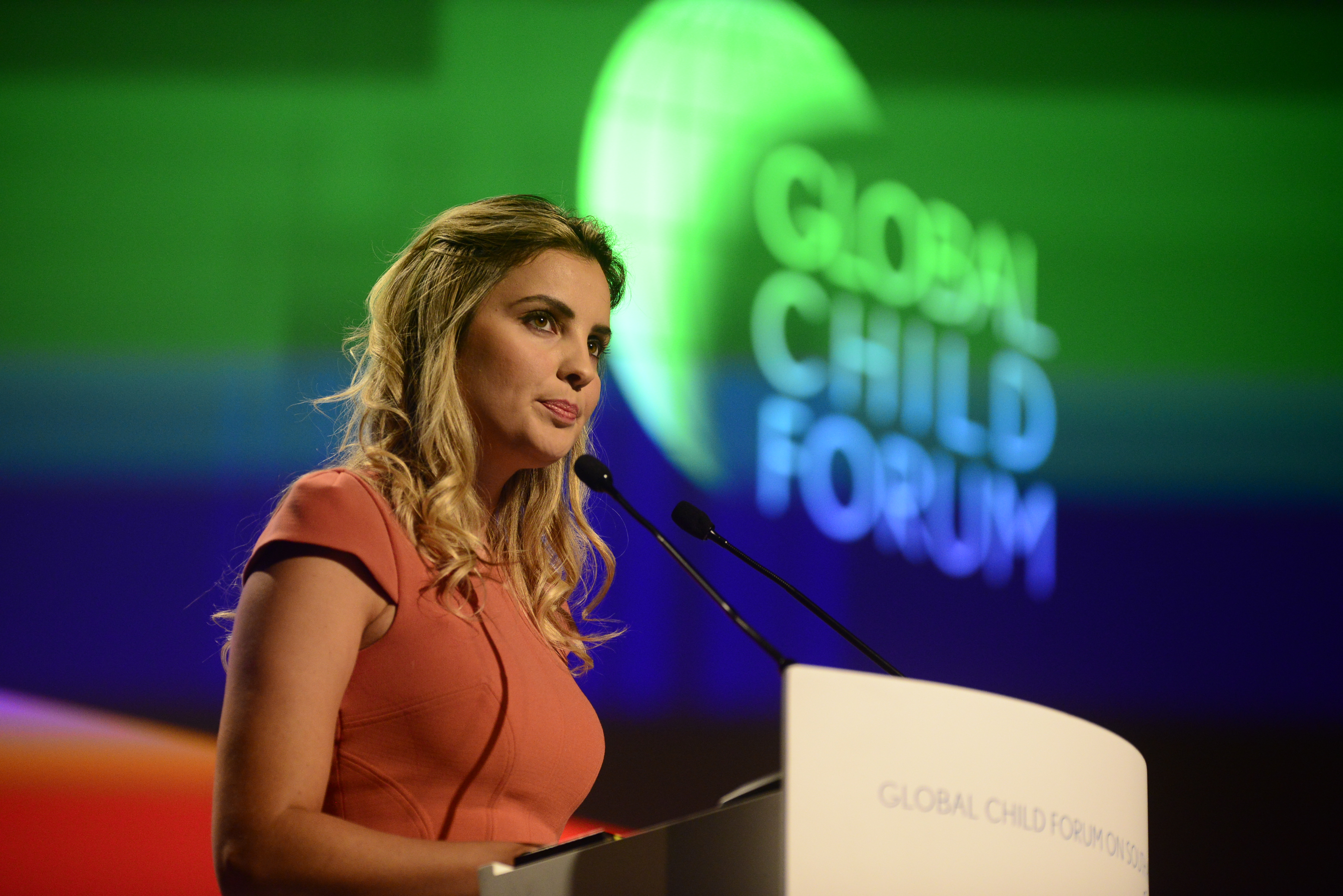
Marcela Temer in Global Child Forum.

Ruth Cardoso assumed the presidency of the Solidarity Community Program, created in 1995 by the government to combat extreme poverty. The program replaced the extinct bodies of the Brazilian Legion of Assistance and the National Food Security Council. In 2000, she created the non-governmental organization Comunitas, in which she acted until her death, having been the forerunner of one of the largest social programs in the country's history, Bolsa Família. Ruth was still noted for her intellectuality, having been the first wife of a president to earn a university degree.

Shortly after becoming first lady of Brazil, Marcela Temer was announced as the ambassador for the "Happy Child" program, which was officially launched on 5 October 2016. Created by the Federal Government for the care of children from 0 to 3 years of age, the program aimed to provide accompanying visits to families linked to the Bolsa Familia Program, encouraging early childhood development in education, social assistance, health, human rights and culture.

Michelle Bolsonaro is committed to advocating for visibility of rare diseases, digital inclusion, awareness of autism, inclusion of LIBRAS (Brazilian Sign Language) in schools and other social projects.

== First ladies' style ==
Among the first thirty-seven first ladies, some draw attention for their style and appearance. Sarah Kubitschek is considered to be one of the most prominent ones as she favored national stylists when the country was rising in the fashion market. Choosing a classic and discreet style, Sarah used to wear various designers, including Zuzu Angel, Dener Pamplona, Guilherme Guimarães and Mena Fiala, responsible for almost all of Sarah's wardrobe.

Considered by People Magazine the most beautiful first lady in the country and one of the 10 most beautiful first ladies in the world, Maria Thereza Goulart became an icon of Brazilian fashion in the early 60s, and used to wear clothes designed by the then nascent Brazilian haute couture. She became a client of the designer Dener Pamplona de Abreu, who was ultimately responsible for her wardrobe. Her glamorous style drew the interest of Brazilian newspapers and became a trend amongst Brazilian women, who were inspired by her clothing. Maria Thereza was the youngest first lady in the country's history, at the age of twenty-one at the time of her inauguration, having been considered by Time magazine as one of the nine Reigning Beauties in the world. She was considered an icon of Brazilian fashion in the early 60s, with the rise of haute couture in the country, attracting national and international attention, printing several covers of Brazilian magazines such as Manchete, Fatos & Fotos and O Cruzeiro; and world famous such as the French Paris Match and the German Stern.

Becoming first lady, Marcela Temer also drew national attention and became a fashion reference. At the parade on 7 September 2016, she appeared in a simple white dress with a discreet neckline. In less than 24 hours, the dress was already sold out at the online store of Brazilian designer Luisa Farani. With a classic and romantic style, the same dress she wore in her first official act as first lady, repeated in her last official act as first lady, being highly praised and associated with the British Catherine, Duchess of Cambridge.

Michelle Bolsonaro has a classic, simple and elegant style. On the day that her husband took office, Michelle was using a model considered simple, but that took 20 days to be made. The medium-length, shoulder-to-shoulder rosé model – inspired by the dresses of former United States first lady Jacqueline Kennedy and Monaco princess Grace Kelly generated positive comments. In her everyday life, she usually sports a casual look, mostly wearing jeans, knit shirts and comfortable wearing. She seems to take a like on classic, discreet, neckless pieces, usually wearing black, a fact that made her choose a dress in the same color with round sleeves for the cocktail party at Itamaraty on the night that her husband became president of Brazil. Her stylist is the Paulistana Marie Lafayette, who dresses the first lady at all official events. At an event held by the Planalto Palace in April 2019, Michelle wore a tube and pearl necklace, drawing comparisons to Diana, Princess of Wales.

== See also ==
- List of first ladies of Brazil
- Second Lady of Brazil
