= Human trafficking in Nigeria =

Nigeria is a source, transit, and destination country for women and children subjected to trafficking in persons including forced labour and forced prostitution. The U.S. State Department's Office to Monitor and Combat Trafficking in Persons placed the country in "Tier 2 Watchlist" in 2017. Trafficked people, particularly women and children, are recruited from within and outside the country's borders – for involuntary domestic servitude, sexual exploitation, street hawking, domestic servitude, mining, begging etc. Some are taken from Nigeria to other West and Central African countries, primarily Gabon, Cameroon, Ghana, Chad, Benin, Togo, Niger, Burkina Faso, and the Gambia, for the same purposes. Children from other West African states like Benin, Togo, and Ghana – where Economic Community of West African States (ECOWAS) rules allow for easy entry – are also forced to work in Nigeria, and some are subjected to hazardous jobs in Nigeria's granite mines. Europe, especially Italy and Russia, the Middle East and North Africa, are prime destinations for forced prostitution. Nigerians accounted for 21% of the 181,000 migrants that arrived in Italy through the Mediterranean in 2016 and about 21,000 Nigerian women and girls have been trafficked to Italy since 2015.

Human trafficking in Nigeria is due to population boom and unfavourable economic conditions that aggravate unemployment, underemployment and insecurity which prompt citizens to seek for better opportunities in other countries. These opportunities include education, decent jobs and higher income. About 15 million Nigerians reside outside Nigeria as a result of demand for access to quality education and jobs. Human trafficking remains a major challenge to the global community because it is a threat to humans and a driver of crime worldwide. Since 2009, Nigeria has made efforts to tackle human trafficking through collaboration with the Police, customs, immigration, Network Against Child Trafficking, Abuse and Labour (NACTAL) and National Agency for the Prohibition of Trafficking in Persons (NAPTIP). Specifically, the Public Enlightenment Unit of NAPTIP, with focus in remote areas of Benue, Kogi, and Edo states, partners with Devatop Centre for Africa Development to create awareness and had educated over 5000 women, teenagers, educators and youth on human trafficking prevention. In 2015, they initiated "The Academy for Prevention of Human Trafficking and Other Related Matters (TAPHOM)", a pilot project to train anti-human trafficking advocates to combat human trafficking in their communities. In 2015 and 2016, the project has trained 120 people from 6 states.

Through these programs, two brothels in Lagos were closed, with 12 females and 6 underaged rescued in the first quarter of 2010. In February 2020, the police also recovered 232 sex trafficking victims and forced labour in the capital city of Niamey. These recovered victims and the likes are usually provided shelter at any of the NAPTIP's eight designated shelters, alongside food, clothing, recreational activities, psychological counselling and vocational training depending on the needs of the victims at any point in time. In such cases, victims stay in the provided shelters for six weeks and are moved to civil society agencies for longer duration. In 2009, Government's expenditure on NAPTIP's shelter facilities was estimated to be $666,000 and vocational training support had been provided for 70 victims as well.

The provision of welfare for human trafficking victims is a requirement of the 2003 Trafficking in Persons Law Enforcement and Administration Act, amended in 2005, and re-enacted in 2015 by former Nigerian president GoodLuck Jonathan. This law prescribes penalty of five years' imprisonment and/or a $670 fine for labour trafficking; 10 years imprisonment for the trafficking of children for forced begging or hawking; and 10 years to life imprisonment for sex trafficking. Child trafficking is also recognized as a criminal offence in the 2003 Child Rights Act enacted in only 23 states in Nigeria. In line with the 2003 Trafficking in Persons Act, NAPTIP have recorded 26 prosecutions and 25 convictions of trafficking offences out of 149 reported investigations, with sentences ranging from two months to 10 years and only two defaulters offered the option of fine payment.

== Prosecution ==
The 2003 Trafficking in Persons Law Enforcement and Administration Act, amended in 2005, and eventually re-enacted in 2015 by President GoodLuck Jonathan to increase penalties for trafficking offenders, and for greater effectiveness prohibits all forms of human trafficking. The law's prescribed penalties of five years' imprisonment and/or a $670 fine for labour trafficking, 10 years imprisonment for the trafficking of children for forced begging or hawking, and 10 years to life imprisonment for sex trafficking are sufficiently stringent and commensurate with penalties prescribed for other serious crimes, such as rape.

Nigeria's 2003 Child Rights Act also criminalizes child trafficking, though only 23 of the country's 36 states, including the Federal Capital Territory, have enacted it. According to the Nigerian constitution, laws pertaining to children's rights fall under state purview; therefore, the Child Rights Act must be adopted by individual state legislatures to be fully implemented. NAPTIP reported 149 investigations, 26 prosecutions, and 25 convictions of trafficking offences during the reporting period under the 2003 Trafficking in Persons Act. Sentences ranged from two months to 10 years, with an average sentence of 2.66 years' imprisonment; only two convicted offenders were offered the option of paying a fine instead of serving prison time.

Together with international partners, the government provided specialized training to officials on how to recognize, investigate, and prosecute instances of trafficking. Police and immigration officials, including those who work at border posts and airports, at times allegedly accepted bribes to overlook trafficking crimes. NAPTIP dismissed two staff members from public service who were found to have diverted victims' funds; they were made to refund the money back.

In 2014 the Executive Director of National Agency for the Prohibition of Traffic in Persons (NAPTIP), Beatrice Jedy-Agba was given in an award by John Kerry in Washington DC to recognize the work that she has been leading against trafficking in Nigeria. In March 2017, Dame Julie Okah-Donli was appointed as the Director-General of NAPTIP, and she has made giant strides in the fight against human trafficking in Nigeria.

=== Human Trafficking of Nigerians in Italy ===
Nigeria is a source as well as a transit point for human trafficking. As a densely populated nation, Nigeria has been tagged as the leading African countries in human trafficking with cross-border and internal trafficking. In 2016, out of the 181,000 migrants who arrived in Italy through the Mediterranean, Nigerians accounted for 21%.≤ Human trafficking is a way to exploit women and children for cheap labour and prostitution as an opportunity to help themselves out of poverty. Nigerian human trafficking occurs within the Nigerian borders, in neighboring countries, and in many European countries because they are able to ship women and children within a network for human trafficking to expand the market within this industry. Nigerian gangs have sent thousands of women into the sex markets within Italy, Spain, and the Netherlands.

About 21,000 Nigerian women and girls have been trafficked to Italy since 2015 with 80% being likely victims of human trafficking. According to a report by the Vie d’Uscita (Exit Routes) project, 64% of girls trafficked to Italy are from Nigeria while the 34% are from Albania, Balkans and Romania. Human trafficking of Nigerian women to Italy began to occur in the 1980s because of the demand for low-skilled labour in agriculture and services. Nigeria has a history of economic and financial issues causing significant unemployment and poverty as well as a tradition of sending young people from poor homes to wealthy family as domestic help. This has exacerbated human trafficking. It is estimated that roughly 15 million Nigerians live abroad to seek education, employment, and a better quality of life than in Nigeria. Harsh economic conditions that have increased unemployment and underemployment, a large population, political instability, insecurity and porous borders are factors that heighten this problem in Nigeria. A popular reason to migrate for some, is to help bring their families out of extreme poverty by getting employment abroad and sending funds home. Nigeria is not rated among the ten poorest nations in Africa with a per capita GNP of about $433.44 billion USD as at Dec 2019.

Human trafficking in Nigeria is being tackled via programs set up by local organization such as NAPTIP's Public Enlightenment Unit that partners with Devatop Centre for Africa Development, and the Italian government that partners with the Nigerian government to lesson the significant rates of human trafficking that occurs in Italy. Italy not only has officers shutting down brothels in major cities, but the government has set up programs with social workers to integrate the women into society once they gain their individual independence. Many Nigerians who go to Italy are illiterate with no experience of urban life, so finding a place to belong within Italian cities can be difficult for Nigerians without any guidance.

The enormity of human trafficking of Nigerian girls and women for sexual exploitation to Italy has inspired a film, Oloture which depicts the harsh conditions these victims pass through and endure to get to Italy. The film, which rated among the 10 top films on Netflix shortly after its release in 2019, is also viewed as a step towards educating girls and women to understand the stark reality behind promises of "a job in Europe".

The majority of women and girls trafficked to Italy are from Edo State in Southern Nigeria. Trafficked victims caught usually refuse to divulge names of the agents who trafficked them and the people they were sold to due to the oaths they were made to swear before fetish native doctors using their hairs, nails and sometimes blood in Edo State. The Oba of Benin who is recognized as the spiritual head in Benin Kingdom, Edo State has recently invoked curses on those who aid and abet trafficking of Edo girls and women to Italy and other places. He also broke all the alleged agreements entered into by the trafficked victims with the traffickers and their agents. This action by the Oba of Benin is expected to decrease the volume of human trafficking from Edo State as well as embolden victims to name traffickers and their agents.

== Protection ==
Nigeria continued its efforts to protect trafficking victims in 2009. Police, customs, immigration, and NAPTIP officials systematically employed procedures to identify victims among high-risk persons, such as young women or girls travelling with non-family members. Data provided by NAPTIP reflected a total of 1,109 victims identified and provided assistance at one of NAPTIP's eight shelters throughout the country during the reporting period; 624 were cases of trafficking for commercial sexual exploitation and 328 for labour exploitation. Various government agencies referred trafficking victims to NAPTIP for sheltering and other protective services: immigration referred 465; police referred 277; Social Services referred 192; and the State Security Service referred nine.

Shelter staff assessed the needs of victims upon arrival and provided food, clothing, shelter, recreational activities, and instruction on various skills, including vocational training; psychological counseling was provided to only the most severe cases. While at NAPTIP's shelters, 70 victims received vocational training assistance provided by government funding. NAPTIP estimated the government's 2009 spending on its shelter facilities to be $666,000. The 2003 Trafficking in Persons Law Enforcement and Administration Act provides for treatment, protection, and non-discriminatory practices for victims. The law specified no trafficking victim could be detained for any offence committed as a result of being trafficked.

During the reporting period, the government took steps to relocate victims' quarters a considerable distance from detention areas for trafficking offenders, greatly reducing the possibility traffickers could exert undue influence over their victims. Victims were allowed to stay in government shelters for six weeks. If a longer time period was needed, civil society partner agencies were contacted to take in the victim. Officials encouraged victims to assist with the investigation and prosecution of traffickers, and victims served as witnesses in all of NAPTIP's successful cases.

Victims could theoretically seek redress through civil suits against traffickers, or claim funds from a Victims' Trust Fund set up in 2009 through which assets confiscated from traffickers are transferred to victims. The Trust Fund committee is chaired by the Minister of Justice and meets four times per year. The government provided a limited legal alternative to the removal of foreign victims to countries where they face hardship or retribution – short-term residency that cannot be extended.

== Prevention ==
NAPTIP's Public Enlightenment Unit works in rural Benue, Kogi, and Edo States, NAPTIP (National Agency for the Prohibition of Trafficking in Persons) introduced grassroots programs and held its first annual race against Human Trafficking in Edo State with 5,000 runners in 2009.

The Public Enlightenment Unit of NAPTIP has partnered with Devatop Centre for Africa Development to educate over 5000 women, teenagers, educators and youth on how to prevent human trafficking. In 2015, they supported Devatop Centre for Africa Development to implement a pilot project: "The Academy for Prevention of Human Trafficking and Other Related Matters (TAPHOM)". The project was initiated to raise anti-human trafficking advocates who will be actively involved in combating human trafficking in their various communities and states.

120 women, youth, educators, law enforcement, legal practitioners, media professionals, health caregivers, and community volunteers from 6 states were trained between July 2015 to May 2016. The participants have been actively involved in preventing human trafficking. The next phase is to establish The Academy for Prevention of Human Trafficking which will focus on training, research, advocacy, counseling and publications.

On the national level, it convened the 2009 Model UN Conference for secondary students with a theme of combating human trafficking. Furthermore, a nine-state tour was launched to establish state working groups against human trafficking. In August 2009, NAPTIP held a stakeholders' workshop in Kaduna to set program priorities and cost estimates for implementing the National Plan of Action. Nigerian troops undergo mandatory human rights and human trafficking training in preparation for peacekeeping duties abroad. Officials moved to shut down two brothels in Lagos during the first quarter of 2010. At these brothels, authorities rescued 12 females, including six underage victims of trafficking. One property owner was convicted, sentenced to two years in prison, and required to forfeit his hotel. In February 2020, the police managed to rescue 232 sex trafficking victims and forced labour in a major operation in Niamey, the capital.

== Anti-human trafficking organisations in Nigeria ==
- Devatop Centre for Africa Development (DCAD), a nonprofit organization with focus on combating human trafficking, gender-based violence, child abuse; and providing educational supports to vulnerable children. It is a youth-led organization that has been at the forefront of combating human trafficking and other related matters. The organization has been engaging young people in building a nation without human trafficking.
- Women Trafficking and Child Labour Eradication Foundation (WOTCLEF), is a nonprofit organization that has taken strong stand against women trafficking and child labour. WOTCLEF advocated for the establishment of NAPTIP.
- Pathfinders Justice Initiative, Inc. (www.pathfindersji.org) is a leading anti-trafficking NGO which works to prevent modern slavery (sex trafficking) and liberate enslaved women and girls through the direct eradication of root causes. It was founded by R. Evon Benson-Idahosa, Esq., a leading expert and thought leader on sex trafficking who is also a consultant to national and international governments and organisations.
- Women's Consortium of Nigeria
- Coalition Against Human Trafficking and Sexual Exploitation of Children
- Viable Knowledge Masters (VKM), is a research and consulting firm that has worked extensively on baby factories and the trafficking in infants and young women taking place in these places. VKM's works on baby factories are published in reputable peer-reviewed journals.
- Edo State Taskforce Against Human Trafficking (ETAHT): Set up on 15 August 2017, by the Edo State Governor, Mr Godwin Obaseki as a response to the high rate of Human Trafficking and irregular migration in the State. ETAHT was primarily set up to totally eradicate the scourge of human trafficking in the State. it is currently chaired by Prof. Yinka Omorogbe. the Attorney General of the State and comm. of Justice.
- PCI ( Patrioic citizens initiative)
- Network Against Child Trafficking, Abuse and Labour (NACTAL)The organization engages in rescuing of victims of human trafficking, anti-human trafficking campaigns, training, and implementation of programmes using the 5 P's (prevention, protection, partnership, prosecution, and policy)to stop human trafficking .
- National Agency for the Prohibition of Trafficking in Persons (NAPTIP) prevents, suppresses and punishes trafficking in persons, especially women and children.

== See also ==
- Prostitution in Nigeria
- Human rights in Nigeria
- Crime in Nigeria
