= Sex trafficking in Nigeria =

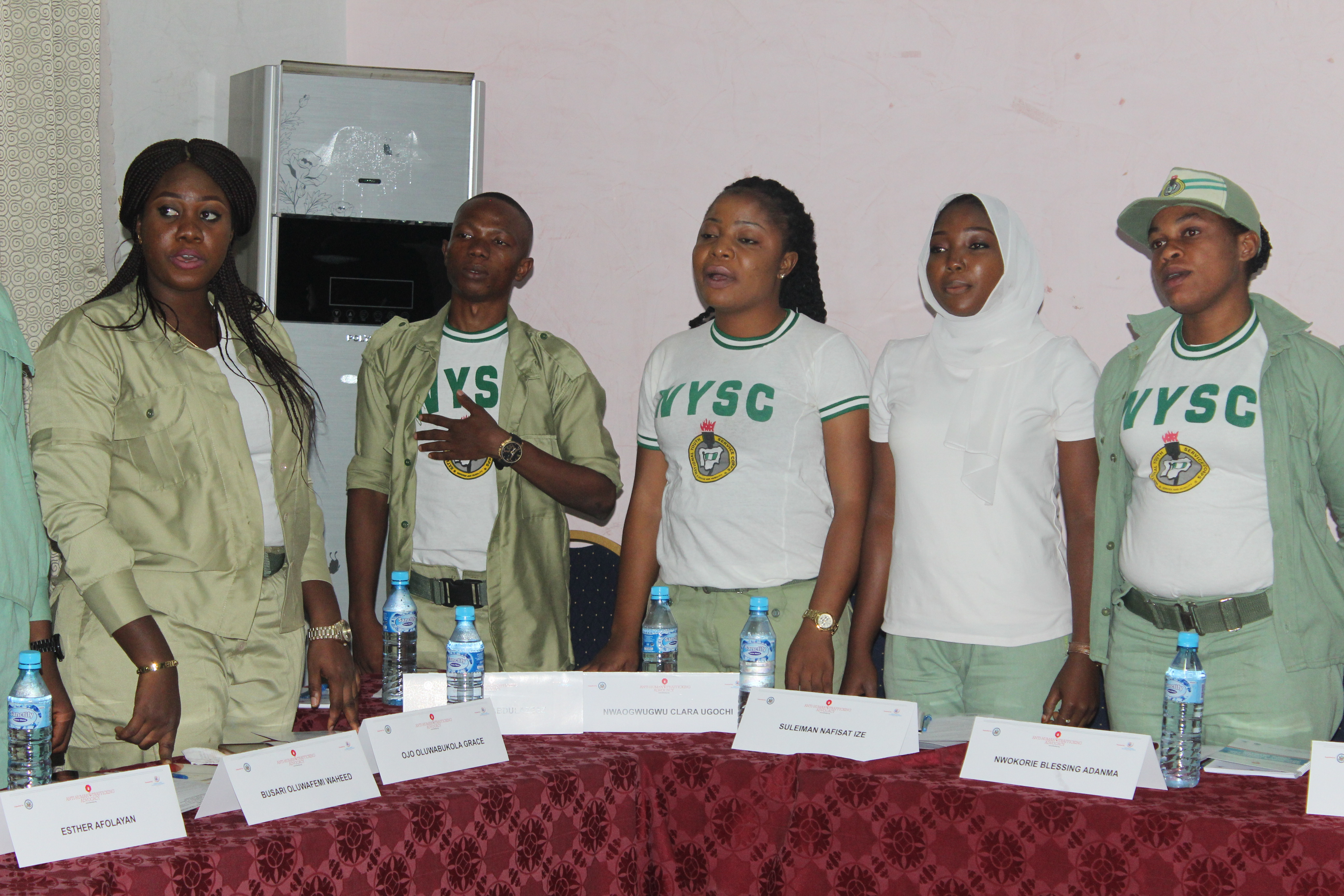
Nigerian Youth Service Corps campaigning against sex trafficking

Sex trafficking in Nigeria is a form of human trafficking which involves reproductive slavery or commercial sexual exploitation Nigeria. This involves the exploitation and movement of people from one location to the other through coercsion, deception or forcibly to exploit them sexually for financial and sexual benefits.

== Background ==
According to a report by the International Organization for Migration (IMO), Italy is one of the major destination of sex traffickers with high increase of trafficked individuals arriving from Nigeria to Italy in January 2017.

== Sex work in Nigeria ==
Sex workers in Nigeria are often referred to as prostitutes or the street slang ashawo and these are people who are either coerced into the act or voluntarily engage in sexual activities for financial gains. As part of the government plans to reduce the menace of sex workers in Nigeria, the acting director, Social Welfare Services, FCT Social Development Secretariat alleged that over 27 commercial sex workers were arrested during its raid on brothels in the Federal Capital Territory.

In another development, the Jigawa Hisbah Board reported that it arrested over 44 commercial sex workers in a part of the state. These arrests shows that even though the Nigeria society has not fully accepted the existence of commercial sex workers, their existence and activities continue to thrive in the country which has led to the trafficking of sex workers.

== Agencies ==
The fight against sex trafficking by the Federal Government of Nigeria has led to the establishment of various agencies and acts to curb this menace in Nigeria. Some of them includes the National Agency for the Prohibition of Trafficking in Persons (NAPTIP), Network Against Child Trafficking, Abuse and Labour (NACTAL) and the Trafficking in Persons (Prohibition) Enforcement and Administration Act, 2015.

== Legislation ==
As part of its role to reduce sex trafficking in Nigeria, the Federal Government of Nigeria has established laws against sex trafficking in Nigeria. One of such laws is the Trafficking in Persons (Prohibition) Enforcement and Administration Act, amended in 2005 and re-enacted in 2015 by President Goodluck Jonathan. The act stipulates penalties for sex trafficking onfenders and similar trafficking issues. A part of the law states that sex trafficking offenders will serve jail term for ten years with hard labour.

National Agency for the Prohibition of Trafficking in Persons (NAPTIP) is also another agency set up to prevent, eradicate, penalize and track traffickers who exploit women and children in Nigeria and beyond.

Network Against Child Trafficking, Abuse and Labour (NACTAL) is an organization set up to tackle child trafficking, sexual trafficking, abuse and labour against women and children in Nigeria. These institutions are empowered and supported by the government to ensure that the menace of sex traffickers is reduced or totally eradicated from the society.

== Current situation ==
Irrespective of the government efforts to reduce the rate of sex trafficking in Nigeria, reports still suggest that sex trafficking is still thriving in Nigeria. The economic situation and the security challenges in the country has put sex trafficking of girls and women at a high rate in Northern Nigeria. Reports also reveal that Nigeria women are involved in these acts of trafficking of women and girls for sexual exploitation.

These girls and women are taken to other parts of the country where they are formed into sexual exploitation while some are moved to outside the borders of Nigeria. In a similar view, the UN Women Executive Director, Phumzile Mlambo-Ngcuka said that the COVID-19 situation and dwindling economic finances has added more weight to the sexual trafficking issues and that nearly 80% of female survivors were trafficked for sexual exploitation.
