= ACJA =

ACJA may be an abbreviation for:

== Organizations ==
- All-China Journalists Association
- Atlantic City Jitney Association
- American Criminal Justice Association
  - American Criminal Justice Association–Lambda Alpha Epsilon

== See also ==
- Administration of Criminal Justice Act, Nigeria
