= Nigeria Sexual Offenders and Service Provider Database =

Nigeria Sexual Offender and Service Provider Database
Agency overview
- Formed: November 2019
- Type: Law enforcement
- Jurisdiction: Federal Government of Nigeria
- Headquarters: Abuja, FCT
- Parent agency: National Agency for the Prohibition of Trafficking in Persons
- Website: Official website

The Nigeria Sexual Offender and Service Provider Database (NSOD) is a database that consists of the sexual offender register and the service provider register. It is a document of the National Agency for the Prohibition of Trafficking in Persons by the Federal Government of Nigeria, published in September 2019 to document cases of sexual violence and run background checks on sexual offenders in the 36 states of Nigeria.

The Database is under the supervision of the National Agency for the Prohibition of Trafficking in Persons (NAPTIP).

The Nigerian Police Force and the Nigeria Security and Civil Defence Corps work in collaboration with NAPTIP to maintain the databases

== Origin ==
The database was established under the Violence Against Persons Probihibition Act (VAPP) 2015 signed by President Goodluck Ebele Jonathan by the Trafficking in Persons (Prohibition) Enforcement and Administration Act (2003). Before the establishment of the database in 2019, there were only 2 (two) known registers in respect to sexual offenses in Nigeria; the Sexual Offenders Registry in Lagos state and the Black book in Ekiti State.

== Objectives ==
The register is made up of two databases; the sexual offenders register and the service provider register. The sexual offender register contains information on cases of sexual violation or abuse that have been reported, arraigned or convicted under the Violence Against person Prohibition Act (VAPP) 2015. The sexual offender and service provider database has information on the 36 states of Nigeria and can be accessed directly on the institution website while other peculiar cases can be accessed on request by the individual or agencies that needs the information.

The service provider register houses the contact details of individuals, agencies, associations, institutions, shelter homes, refugee camps, counseling houses and non-governmental bodies responsible for providing assistance to victims of sexual abuses and violence

The penalty for sexual offense as stated in the VAPP Act, 2015 consists of life imprisonment, heavy fines and also inclusion of an offender's name in a list of shame which can be accessed by anyone who needs to run background integrity test.

== Achievements ==
Since its inception, the agency has recorded significant progress in the documentation of the sexual offenders in the National Sexual Offender and Service Provider Database. In March 2022, the executive director, Women's Rights Advocates Research and Documentation Centre, Dr. Abiola Akiyode-Afolabi confirmed that about 602 cases of sexual offenses have been reported and verified with some of the offenders convicted already and new service providers have been documented.

In another development, Wale Fapohunda, the Ekiti State Attornery General and Commissioner of Justice confirmed that since the National Offender and Service Provider Database was activated, over 573 cases of sexual offenses have been documented by the databases. In December 2021, the Director of NAPTIP, Dr Fatima Waziri-Azi confirmed in a report that over 573 cases have been updated on the database inclusive of convictions, pending cases and cases under investigation. In line with the database, the Chairman Lagos State House of Assembly on Women Affairs, Poverty Alleviation and Job Creation, Mojisolaoluwa Alli-Macaulay confirmed that Lagos state government is coming up with bills and acts that will ensure any sexual violence against women is well documented to ensure that culprits are named and shamed.
