= Chidiebere =

Chidiebere is a given name and surname of Igbo origin. It means "chi is merciful". Notable people with the name include:

- Chidiebere Aneke (born 1986), Nigerian actor, one of the Aneke twins
- Chidiebere Ibe (born 1996), Nigerian medical illustrator
- Chidiebere Nwakali (born 1996), Nigerian footballer
- Ethan Chidiebere Nwaneri (born 2007), English footballer
- Joseph Osuigwe Chidiebere (born 1985), Nigerian anti-human trafficking advocate
- Nnamdi Oduamadi Chidiebere (born 1990), Nigerian footballer
