= Trafficking in Persons (Prohibition) Enforcement and Administration Act, 2015 =

Trafficking in Persons (Prohibition) Enforcement and Administration Act

National Assembly of the Federal Republic of Nigeria
- Long title: Trafficking in Persons (Prohibition) Enforcement and Administration Act, 2015
- Territorial extent: Nigeria
- Enacted by: National Assembly of the Federal Republic of Nigeria
- Enacted: 26th March, 2015

Amended by
- 2005 and 2015

The 2015 Trafficking in Persons (Prohibition) Enforcement and Administration Act is an act which was initially passed in 2003 and amended in 2005 and 2015 by the Federal Government of Nigeria. The act was established to provide welfare and support for trafficked persons while also announcing penalties for offenses related to human trafficking in Nigeria. The act led to the establishment of the National Agency for the Prohibition of Trafficking in Persons (NAPTIP).

== Core Objective ==
The act was established with three main objectives of:

1. Providing an all-inclusive framework for the prohibition, prevention, detection, prosecution and punishment for human trafficking related offences in Nigeria;
2. Protection of human trafficked victims; and
3. Collaborate with national and International organizations to achieve objectives 1 and 2.

== Content ==
The Trafficking in Persons (Prohibition) Enforcement and Administration Act, 2015 is a 23 page document published by the Federal Government of Nigeria. The act is divided into 12 parts (Part I - XII). They include:

Part I- this part defines the objectives of the act as re-enacted in 2015. It identified three main objectives.

Part II- specifies the establishment of the National Agency for the Prohibition of Trafficking in Persons under the act. it further highlighted the functions and powers of the agency as well as the composition and tenure of office of members of the Governing board.

Part III- discusses the Prohibition of Acts of Trafficking in Persons.

Part IV- lists the different human trafficking related offences and their penalties. The offences include forced labour, procurement of persons for sexual exploitation, slave dealing and trafficking in slaves, conspiracy, aiding and abetting of escape of offenders amongst others.

Part V- indicates the jurisdiction to try Offences under this Act.

Part VI- explains the financial provision for the agency (National Agency for the Prohibition of Trafficking in Persons). it also explains the condition for the receipt of gifts as well as for borrowing.

Part VII- discusses issues relating to Search, arrest and Seizure. it also addresses issuance of warrant for investigation and protection of informants.

Part VIII- explains the issues surrounding the attachments and forfeiture of assets (of offenders).

Part IX- focuses on the treatment of trafficked persons, including establishment of transit shelter and right to compensation.

Part X- indicates the establishment of Victims of Trafficking Trust Fund and the Trust Fund Committee.

Part XI- addresses the mutual legal assistance, exchange of information and extradition.

Part XII- explains other miscellaneous issues of the act.

== Implementation ==
The act was implemented by the Federal Government of Nigeria under the administration of the country`s former president, President Goodluck Jonathan, as part of Nigeria`s obligation for being a signatory to the Trafficking in Persons Protocol.

== NAPTIP Interventions ==
Since its establishment in 2003, NAPTIP have been involved in human trafficking and human rights violation interventions in Nigeria. In 2020, the agency rescued 108 trafficked Nigerians from Mali, while a total of 18 trafficked victims were recued in 2021.

== See also ==
- Human trafficking in Nigeria
- Human rights in Nigeria
