= Law of Nigeria =

The Law of Nigeria consists of courts, offences, and various types of laws. Nigeria has its own constitution which was established on 29 May 1999. The Constitution of Nigeria is the supreme law of the country. There are four distinct legal systems in Nigeria, which include English law, Common law, Customary law, and Sharia Law. English law in Nigeria is derived from the colonial Nigeria, while common law is a development from its post-colonial independence.

Customary law is derived from indigenous traditional norms and cultural practices, including the dispute resolution meetings of pre-colonial Yoruba land secret societies and the Èkpè and Okónkò of Igboland and Ibibioland. Sharia Law (also known as Islamic Law) used to be used only in Northern Nigeria, where Islam is the predominant religion. It is also being used in Lagos State, Oyo State, Kwara State, Ogun State, and Osun State by Muslims. The country has a judicial branch, the highest court of which is the Supreme Court of Nigeria.

- The Nigerian Criminal Code is currently chapter 77 of Laws of the Federation of Nigeria 1990; it applies only to the southern, Christian-dominated states since 1963. It derives from the British colonial code introduced by High Commissioner Frederick Lugard, 1st Baron Lugard in 1904, became the Criminal Code of 1916, was included as chapter 42 in the 1958 edition of the Laws of the Federation of Nigeria; until 1959 it only applied to the northern states of Nigeria, but since 1963 it only applies to the southern states of Nigeria.
- The Nigerian Penal Code, also known as the Penal Code of Northern Nigeria, is currently chapter 89 of the Laws of Northern Nigeria 1963; it applies only to the northern, Muslim-dominated states since 1960. It was originally introduced on 30 September 1960, derived from the Sudanese Penal Code, which in turn was derived from the Indian Penal Code.

== Hierarchy of the Nigerian Legal System range ==
The Nigerian constitution recognizes courts as either Federal or State courts. A primary difference between both is that the President appoints justices/judges to federal courts, while State Governors appoint judges to state courts. All appointments (federal or state) are based on the recommendations of the National Judicial Council.

The Federal courts are: the Supreme Court, the Court of Appeal and the Federal High Court.

The State courts include: the High Court of a State, the Customary Court of Appeal of a State and the Sharia Court of Appeal of a State. Each of the states (currently thirty-six) is constitutionally allowed to have all of these courts. However, the predominantly Muslim northern states tend to have Sharia courts rather than Customary courts. The predominantly Christian southern states tend to have Customary courts and not Sharia courts.

Due to the fact that the Nigerian capital (known as The Federal Capital Territory, FCT) is not a state, it has no Governor. Its courts that are equivalent to the state courts have their Judges appointed by the President and are thus federal courts. The FCT courts are the High Court of the FCT, the Customary Court of Appeal of the FCT and the Sharia Court of Appeal of the FCT.

=== Tier 1 Court: Supreme Court ===
The Supreme Court of Nigeria is the highest court in Nigeria. It is based in the capital, Abuja. The Supreme Court is mainly a court of appellate jurisdiction and is the final appeal court in the country. It also has original jurisdiction in State vs. State and State vs. Federal Government cases. The Supreme Court is headed by a Chief Justice who is assisted by other Justices. The appointment of the Chief Justice and Justices requires confirmation by the presiding Senate.

=== Tier 2 Court: Court of Appeal ===
The next highest court is the Court of Appeal, in Abuja. However, to bring the administration of justice closer to the people, the Court of Appeal has multiple divisions (currently twenty) in various parts of the country. The head of the Court of Appeal has the title President of the Appeal Court. The President is assisted by Justices. Only the appointment of the President of the Appeal Court requires Senate confirmation.

The Court of Appeal is mainly a court of appellate jurisdiction; however, it has original jurisdiction for presidential and vice-presidential election petitions. The Federal Court of Appeal is where the multiple legal systems (English, Customary and Sharia) of Nigeria converge. It is constitutionally required to have at least three Judges who are versed in customary law and at least three Judges who are versed in Islamic personal law.

Judgements from the tier 2 court can be appealed to the Supreme Court (the tier 1 court).

=== Tier 3 Courts ===
Just below the Federal Court of Appeal are the tier 3 courts. They include: (1) the Federal High Court and (2) the High Court of a state/FCT, (3) the Customary Court of Appeal of a state/FCT and (4) the Sharia Court of Appeal of a state/FCT.

The Federal High Court is based in Abuja. In order to bring the administration of justice closer to the people it has a division in each of the thirty-six states of the country. The Federal High Court is generally a court of original jurisdiction. However, it has appellate jurisdiction from tribunals such as the Tax Appeal Tribunal. It is presided over by a Chief Judge who is assisted by other Judges.

The High Court of a state/FCT is the highest English law court in a state or the FCT. The High Court of a state/FCT and the Federal High Court have similar powers. Due to the fact that there is a division of the Federal High Court in each state and that each state has its own High Court, there is usually some confusion as to which court is which. For example, in Lagos state, there is a Federal High Court, Lagos and a High Court of Lagos State (sometimes referred to as The Lagos State High Court). It is presided over by a Chief Judge who is assisted by other Judges.

The Customary Court of Appeal of a state/FCT is the highest Customary law court in a state/FCT. It is presided over by a Judge who has the title: President of the Customary Court of Appeal of the state/FCT and is assisted by other Judges.

The Sharia Court of Appeal of a state/FCT is the highest Sharia law court in a state/FCT. It is presided over by a Grand Khadi who is assisted by other Khadis.

Judgements from the tier 3 courts can be appealed to the tier 2 court (Federal Court of Appeal).

=== Tier 4 Courts: State Courts ===
The lowest courts in the country are all state courts (there is no federal court in this group). They include (i) the Magistrate Courts that handle English law cases (ii) the Customary Courts that handle Customary law cases and (iii) the Sharia Courts that handle Sharia law cases.

Judgements from the tier 4 courts can be appealed only to their respective higher tier 3 courts (e.g. judgements from the English law Magistrates Court can only be appealed to the tier 3 English law court (the High Court of a state/FCT).

=== Other Courts ===
==== Election Tribunals ====
There are two types of election tribunals viz.: (1) National Assembly Election Tribunals that deal with petitions from the Senate and House of Representatives elections(house of rep) and (2) Governorship and Legislative Election Tribunals that deal with petitions from the Gubernatorial and State House of Assembly elections. Election tribunals are set up by the President of the Federal Court of Appeal in consultation with the Chief Judges of the High Courts of the states, Presidents of the Customary Courts of Appeal of the states and/or Grand Khadis of the Sharia Courts of Appeal of the states.

==== Code of Conduct Tribunal ====
The Code of Conduct Tribunal is established by the Chapter C15 Code of Conduct Bureau and Tribunal Act, No. 1 of 1989 Laws of the Federation of Nigeria, 2004 with commencement date of 1 January 1991, which "provide for the establishment of the Code of Conduct Bureau and Tribunal to deal with complaints of Corruption by public servants for the breaches of its provisions.

The Code of Conduct Tribunal (CCT) shall consist of a chairman and two other members, whose chairman shall be a person who has held or is qualified to hold office as a Judge of a superior court of record in Nigeria and shall receive such remuneration as may be prescribed by law. The chairman and other members of the Tribunal shall be appointed by the President on the recommendation of the National Judicial Council. The tenure of office of the CCT chairman and members shall expired when he attains the age of seventy years.

A person holding the office of chairman or member of the Code of Conduct Tribunal shall not be removed from his office or appointment by the President except upon an address supported by two-thirds majority of each House of the National Assembly of Nigeria praying that he be so removed for inability to discharge the functions of the office in question (whether arising from infirmity of mind or body) or for misconduct or for contravention of the Act. A person holding the office of chairman or member of the Tribunal shall not be removed from office before retiring age, save in accordance with the provisions of the section of the Act.

Judgements from the Code of Conduct Tribunal can be appealed to the tier 2 court (Federal Court of Appeal).

== Sharia ==
Sharia law (also known as Islamic law) is law that is used only in the predominantly Muslim northern states of the country. Sharia, meaning "way" or "path" in religious law of Islam, has been in Nigeria for a long time. Civil sharia law has been enshrined in the various Nigerian constitutions since independence. The most recent constitution came into effect in 1999. With the return of the country to democratic rule in 1999, some of the predominantly Muslim northern states have instituted full sharia law (criminal and civil). Full sharia law was first passed into law in Zamfara in late 1999 and the law came into effect in January 2000. Since then, eleven other states have followed suit. These states are Kano, Katsina, Niger, Bauchi, Borno, Kaduna, Gombe, Sokoto, Jigawa, Yobe, and Kebbi.

== List of acts and decrees ==
The following is a list of legislation and acts created by the National Assembly:

=== Acts of the National Assembly ===
- The Bills of Exchange Act (1917)
- Electricity Ordinance Act 1929.
- The Anatomy Act (1933)
- Electricity Corporation of Nigeria Ordinance 1950. No. 15.
- The Acts Authentication Act (1962)
- The Niger Dams Act 1962.
- National Electric Power Authority Decree 1972. No. 24.
- The Bankruptcy Act (1979)
- Energy Commission of Nigeria Decree 1989. No. 19
- Energy Commission of Nigeria Act 1988. No 32
- Electricity Act 1990
- National Electricity Power Authority (NEPA) Act 1990.
- The Arbitration and Conciliation Act (1998)
- National Electric Power Authority (Amendment) Act 1998. No. 29.

4th National Assembly: 1999 - 2003

- Constitution of the Federal Republic of Nigeria 1999
- The Criminal Code Act
- The Penal Code
- The Child Right act 2003
- National Electric Power Authority Act 2004.
- Electric Power Sector Reform (EPSR) Act 2005. No. 6.

5th National Assembly: 2003 - 2007

- Border Communities Development Agency Act, 2003

6th Parliament: 2007 - 2011

- Public Procurement Act 2007
- Evidence Act 2011

7th National Assembly: 2011 - 2015

- Federal Capital Territory Internal Revenue Service Act 2015

8th National Assembly: 2015 - 2019

- Trafficking in Persons (Prohibition), (Enforcement And Administration) Act, 2015

9th National Assembly: 2019 - 2023

- Companies and Allied Matters Act 2020 (CAMA) Act, 2020

=== Decrees of the Federal Military Government ===
- Energy Commission of Nigeria Decree 1979. No. 62
- Electricity (Amendment) Decree 1998.
- NEPA (Amendment) Decree 1998.
- Privatization and Commercialization Decree 1988. No. 25.
- The Administration of Justice Commission Decree 1991 (No 55)
- The Admiralty Jurisdiction Decree 1991 (No 59)
- The Banks and Other Financial Institutions Decree 1991
- The Central Bank of Nigeria Decree 1991 (No 24)
- The Exclusive Economic Zone Decree
- The Land Use Decree 1978
- The Petroleum Decree 1978

== Legal training ==
- See Nigerian Law School.
- See University of Benin
- See University of Abuja
- See University of Lagos
- see University of Ibadan
- see University of Nigeria, Nsukka
- see Nnamdi Azikiwe University
- see Afe Babalola University
- see University of Maiduguri
- see Nile University of Nigeria

== See also ==
- Blasphemy law in Nigeria
- Criminal Justice System in Nigeria
- Perjury in Nigeria
