= Amina Titi Atiku-Abubakar =

Second Lady of Nigeria (1999–2007)

Second Lady of Nigeria
- In role 29 May 1999 – 29 May 2007
- Vice President: Atiku Abubakar
- First Lady: Stella Obasanjo
- Preceded by: Mrs. Akhigbe
- Succeeded by: Patience Jonathan

Personal details
- Born: Titilayo Albert; 6 June 1951 (age 75) Ilesha, Southern Region, British Nigeria (now Ilesha, Osun State, Nigeria)
- Spouse: Atiku Abubakar (m. 1971)
- Education: Kaduna Polytechnic

Amina Titilayo Atiku-Abubakar (born Titilayo Albert; 6 June 1951) is a Nigerian advocate of women and child rights and the wife of former vice president of the Federal Republic of Nigeria, Atiku Abubakar. She is the founder of Women Trafficking and Child Labour Eradication Foundation (WOTCLEF) and the initiator of the private bill that led to the establishment of National Agency for the Prohibition of Trafficking in Persons (NAPTIP).

== Early life and education ==
Titilayo Albert was born into a Christian home to the Albert family, a Yoruba family from Ilesa, Osun state. She was raised in Lagos and had her primary education in Lafiaji, Lagos then proceeded to St. Mary's Iwo, Osun state for her secondary education up until 1969.

In 1971, she married Atiku Abubakar, then a young customs officer, before attending Kaduna Polytechnic. Apart from English, she speaks Yoruba and Hausa languages fluently. She converted from Christianity to Islam.

== Career and advocacy ==
She was a lecturer at Kaduna State Polytechnic. While in Rome to further her education in 1986 and 1987, she saw many Nigerian girls on the street. After making inquiry, she realized that many of the girls served as prostitutes for their madams, and quite often were not paid.

=== WOTCLEF & NAPTIP ===
In 1999, when her husband, Atiku Abubakar became Nigeria's vice president, she started an advocacy to end forced prostitution and other forms of human trafficking. She founded Women Trafficking and Child Labour Eradication Foundation (WOTCLEF), and then sponsored a private bill for strict punishment for traffickers, and for the establishment of a federal agency, the National Agency for Prohibition of Trafficking in Persons, responsible for fighting trafficking of persons in Nigeria. She also ran education courses focused on welcoming and rehabilitating girls repatriated from different countries back home to Nigeria.

== Awards ==
- Annual Nigerian Women's Award (2002)
- D'linga Award (2010)

== Publications ==
Amina Titi Abubakar is the author of a number of publications including:

- Educating the Nigerian Child
- Empower Law to Fight Child Slavery
- Let Us Celebrate Humanity: A collected speeches on women's right and human trafficking

== See also ==
- Atiku Abubakar
- Oluwaseun Osowobi
