= Human trafficking in Edo State =

The rate of Human Trafficking in Edo State is alarming in this region of Nigeria. Located in Nigeria's Southern region, Edo State accounts for the highest proportion of irregular migrants in Nigeria. Young girls in Edo state are enticed with false promises to leave Nigeria and travel abroad for a better life, by the traffickers. The traffickers in this state also use manipulation, diabolical oath and debt bondage to control their victims and force them into slavery, forced labour, sex trafficking, and organ sales.

== Prevalence ==
Human trafficking reports and data have shown that Edo state is a prominent source location for trafficking victims and one of the most trafficked destinations in Africa. In 2016, nearly 11,000 women who arrived in Italy for sex trafficking through the Mediterranean Sea, came from Edo state. In 2017, out of 119,000 migrants who arrived in Italy, it was estimated that 18,185 were from Nigeria, 5,425 were women and 94% of these victims came from Edo State. In 2018, 50% of Nigerians who were trapped in Libya hailed from Edo State.

== Recruitment of the Victims ==
Traffickers in Edo State use various strategies to recruit young girls and women for sex trafficking. These include invoking supernatural forces, popularly known as "juju". The young girls who are to be trafficked, are brought to "juju" shrines in remote villages within Benin, where they are forced to swear oaths and drink ritual concoctions. The oath taking is done to seal a pact between the traffickers and the girls, who agree to repay their debts to the traffickers and to never betray them.

Another strategy of traffickers is to target families who are in dire economic straits, and offer to send their daughters to foreign countries to find work. Such parents will then hand over their children to the care of the traffickers. Other traffickers may employ personal relationships (that is, using victim's relatives, friends or lovers) as a means of influencing unsuspecting people into being trafficked.

== Intervention ==
In Edo State, several anti-human trafficking interventions have been developed and implemented by the government, international organisations, non-governmental organisations to check the menace of trafficking in the state. In August 2017, the Edo State government launched the Edo State Task Force Against Human Trafficking (ETAHT) through the Edo State Trafficking in Persons Prohibition law passed by the Edo State House of Assembly and assented by the governor of state Godwin Obaseki on May 23, 2018. The ETAHT reported that they are engaged receiving victims of human trafficking of Edo state origin, provision of counselling, vocational training, shelter, advocacy programmes and anti-human trafficking research. As at March 2022, the ETAHT reported to have received 5,142 returnees who were victims of human trafficking, 614 returnees have been trained and N101million has been spent to support the victims.

== Causes ==
The root cause of human trafficking is the trafficker. Human trafficking is often worsened by poverty, unstable family structures, harmful traditional beliefs and practices, human greed and lust for power etc.

== Types ==
Several forms of human trafficking exists in Edo State, however, some forms are widespread; for instance:

- Commercial sexual exploitation
- Sex trafficking

== See also ==
- Human trafficking in Nigeria
- Slavery in Nigeria
