= Lagos State Task Force on Human Trafficking =

Lagos State Taskforce on Human Trafficking
- Formation: 2020
- Headquarters: Lagos
- Agency Executive: Mr. Moyosore Onigbanjo (SAN)

The Lagos State Task Force Against Human Trafficking is a Nigerian task force established by the Lagos State Government to tackle human trafficking and irregular migration. On September 8, 2020, the Executive Governor of Lagos State, Babajide Sanwo-Olu, inaugurated the state task force on human trafficking at the Government house, with the overall objective of coordinating a multi-sectoral response to prevent human trafficking, provide access to justice for victims of trafficking, prosecute traffickers and enhance the process of successfully restoring survivors to a state of physical, psycho-social, vocational and economic well-being. This task force is currently being replicated in other southwestern states of Nigeria.

== Mission ==
The Lagos State Task Force on Human Trafficking was formed to curb the menace of human trafficking and irregular migration in the state through inter-agency cooperation.

== Objectives ==
1. Coordinating and reactivating technical inter-agency cooperation in the fight against TIP (Trafficking In Persons)
2. Assisting in the rehabilitation and reintegration of victims of Trafficking in Lagos state.
3. Developing a work plan for lagos in the collective fight against trafficking in person using the national Zero draft Template.
4. Researching and promoting strategies in tackling TIP.

== Achievements ==
In coordination with the National Agency for the Prohibition of Trafficking in Persons, the task force had rescued and provided support for 4,753 victims of human trafficking between 2022 and 2024.

== Partners and affiliate ==
1. NAPTIP
2. International Organization for Migration (IOM).
3. Patriotic Citizens' Initiatives (PCI).
4. Child Protection Network (CPN).
