= Prostitution in Nigeria =

Prostitution in Nigeria is illegal in all Northern States that uses the penal code and sharia law also known as Islamic law. In Southern Nigeria, the activities of pimps or madams, underage prostitution and the operation or ownership of brothels are penalized under sections 223, 224, and 225 of the Nigerian Criminal Code. Even though the Nigerian constitution/Nigerian law does not legalize commercial sex work, it is vague if such work is performed by an independent individual who operates on his or her own accord without the use of pimps.

The Nigeria criminal system prohibits national and trans-national trafficking of women for commercial sex or forced labour. Nigeria is a signatory to the 2000 United Nations Protocol to Prevent, Suppress and Punish Trafficking in Persons, especially Women and Children.

== History ==
=== Sexual practices in pre-colonized Nigeria ===
Colonial ideas surrounding sex and female sexuality affected the ways in which the sexual practices of Nigerian women were viewed. In Pre colonial Nigeria there were many alternative viewpoints on female sexuality along with differing sexual practices.

Traditionally in Nigeria there was a heavy emphasis put on chastity. Certain customs and practices were instituted to deter young girls from engaging in premarital sex. One of these was called Fattening rites or mbokpo which was practiced by Efiks in Southern Nigeria and Anangs of Ikot Ekpene in Akwa Ibom state.

Young girls were put in confinement for some time depending on the wealth of their families, and received visits from older women who fed and taught them laws of the land and marital duties. Among these duties were child care, cleaning, sewing, cooking, and how to act in front of one's husband. Along with this, girls were given information about sexual crimes, adultery, and premarital sex, which were punishable by death by Ekpo nko Aqwo, a deity who punishes cheating women. Often an unmarried girl was found out to be pregnant; she would undergo humiliation by being paraded through the streets naked, while villagers threw things or jeered.

In Ancient Yoruba Kingdom, it was customary for the groom to show a white fabric soaked with the bride's blood as a proof of her virginity. This act brought respect and admiration from the groom's family, as it was an acknowledgement that the bride wasn't promiscuous.

Although, chasity among young girls was placed with high regard, scholarly work reveals a variety of socially permissible sexual interactions outside marriage. An example of this is the act of adultery. A study conducted by Delius and Glasier, concluded that marriage in African societies was less about asserting control over women's sexuality and more about making sure child births were consistent with efficient labor productivity. In Yoruba societies, women would marry other women into their families if they were infertile or had only a few children.

During the mid to late 19th century concubinage, also became more widespread in Nigeria, due to the mass transportation of male slaves. Many of the young men who had not been taken for slavery were unable to pay high bride prices for women who held value for reproductive and economic roles. For men who did not have the financial means to marry, taking on women who were slaves was an accepted route.

=== Pre-Independence: Lagos ===
Nigeria was under British colonial rule until independence in 1960. Scholars have argued that British presence contributed to the expansion of prostitution in the country and legal attitudes to it. Starting in the early 1900s, the rising economic importance of Lagos as a seaport and capital city changed the political and economic landscape of the city and contributed to the arrival of Nigerians from the hinterland. The demographic and commercial changes also expanded to commodification of sex and by 1910, commercial sex services had become prevalent.

"Hawking" which is a slang term for prostitution, is argued by researchers like Saheed Aderinto to have only been possible in major cities in Nigeria like Lagos, where the population jumped rapidly from 5,000 inhabitants to a quarter of a million in over a century. The idea is that poverty increased with the population, which encouraged the entrance of children in the workforce; resulting in young girls working as "hawkers" in Lagos.

In 1916, the colonial government enacted a law prohibiting solicitation by women but the law did not define prostitution. The law was implemented discretionarily by the government, and commercial sex work was tolerated as long it did not lead to public nuisance. In a country steeped with a religious and traditional moralist sentiments, sex work was not tolerated by some women in the community.

In 1923, the Lagos Women League, an elite women organization wrote a petition to the police chief seeking the cancellation of restrictions placed on the recruitment of women as police officers. The petition was written partly to curb a rise in prostitution and also the patronage of prostitutes by male officers. They also asked the government to step into the situation in Lagos as they claimed it was becoming the "headquarters" of prostitution. In response, secretary Donald Cameron emphasized that the Colony police was taking care of any prostitute who had caused any sort of disruption to the public. The elite women organization wanted actual policy and continued to petition the government to do something about the prostitutes. They specifically asked for them to be relocated back to their home countries as many of them were not Nigerian born.

Public opinion was also critical of the sex trade linking it with juvenile delinquency. In 1932, Tijani Omoyele, a musician released an album, Asewo/ Omo j aguda (prostitutes are thieves or criminals). By the 1930s, prostitutes were linked with notorious delinquents' groups like the Jagudas and Boma boys in Lagos and they were beginning to be called Ashewo or people who change money into lower denominations. During the pre-World War II period commercial sex workers solicited clients in brothels, cinemas and hotels bars in the Lagos Island districts of Broad St, Breadfruit, Labinjo, Martins, Porto Novo Market- and Taiwo In Lagos, commercial sex work was majorly practiced by non-Lagos natives and were called names like Ashewo (Yoruba word), Karuwaci (Hausa), Akwunakwuna (Igbo word) and Asape. Another name commonly used was "Akunakuna" which was a reference to a towns name in Ogoja, which is where most are believed to have came from when the first transnational prostitution occurred around 1938; the thousands of prostitutes were believed to have brought in 2,000 pounds in a month.

Many of the workers sometimes returned to their native land with enough money to earn the wrath of men who were not used to women being wealthier than them. The efforts made by Lagos Women League were not enough to cause actual change in the prostitution business, actual policing did not occur until 1940s.

After the onset of World War II, British officials became apprehensive about any link between high venereal disease rates in West African Frontier Force soldiers and promiscuous sexual affairs with prostitutes. This was backed up by the fact that in 1942 there were 43.2% VD contractions in WAFF; it was reported that these numbers of contraction were higher than those of malaria and any other infections. As the rates of STDs went up, so did the panic. Soon there would be rumors that African gonorrhea had a higher death rate than any other kind.

During this period, forced prostitution of teenagers was becoming common. In Abidjan in 1943, a Nigerian born child prostitute named Lady was killed by her older handler, Mary Eyeamevber Eforghere of Warri Province, Nigeria, for refusing to have sex with a European sailor. The combination of the fear of venereal diseases, child prostitution, and controlling juvenile delinquency created a new impetus to prohibit prostitution. In 1941, an anti-vice squad was formed to prosecute offenders based on two newly created laws, the Unlicensed Guide (Prohibition) Ordinance and the Venereal Disease Ordinance. The former was also known informally as the loitering law which was designed to limit the link between foreign sex tourists and prostitutes. The law required tour guards to obtain license guards in order to perform their work. The law targeted both young delinquents who were considered the pimps and the prostitutes. In addition, prostitutes who loiter on the street and make advances towards tourists were arrested by the anti-vice squad.

In 1942, a hostel was built to rehabilitate child prostitutes in Lagos and a year later, the Children and Young Persons Ordinance was passed prohibiting child prostitution. The colonial government also established a welfare and social services department to manage the hostel and rehabilitation of child prostitutes. By 1946, a set of law was enacted that clearly defined prostitution and its prohibition.

=== Child prostitution ===
Child prostitution is prostitution involving a child, and it is a form of commercial sexual exploitation of children. The term normally refers to prostitution of a minor, or person under the legal age of consent, which can vary from country to country. In most jurisdictions, child prostitution is illegal as part of a general prohibition on prostitution.

==== Causes ====
Poor economic situations in many developing countries, can often lead to poor socioeconomic situations for parents, which has implications on a child's upbringing. Often this creates circumstances in which children need to economically support their families. For many young girls, this means engaging in exploitative economic activities such as prostitution. For some young girls in Nigeria, especially teenage girls, it has been indicated that prostitution is becoming an "occupation". Countless girls position themselves in strategically geographic locations such as night clubs or bars. Bamgbose asserted that teenage girls are seemingly competing with older women who dominate the market. It should be made clear that child prostitution is not a problem that only affects Nigeria, a report released by the Global March against Child Labor shows that children around the world are involved in prostitution.

==== Human trafficking ====
Human trafficking is defined by the United Nations Office on Drugs and Crime (UNODC) as "the recruitment, transport, transfer, harboring or receipt of a person by such means as threat or use of force or other forms of coercion, of abduction, of fraud or deception for the purpose of exploitation".

Many young girls are also unwilling participants in prostitution, through methods of trafficking. Traffickers usually recruit the vulnerable with promises of better conditions elsewhere. Young girls can be baited by promises of economic opportunities with higher earnings than those available in their local communities. Along with this there are promises of skill-based training and education. Some jobs that are promised are in overseas markets such as Europe, and these children are told they will have opportunities to work as nannies, cleaners, hairdressers, etc. On occasions traffickers use monetary items such as clothes, money, and food to prove their ability to care for and help individuals. Many of these individuals are unaware of the type of labor they will be subjected to.

=== 20th century: Tolerance and rise in sex trafficking ===
After independence in 1960, brothels and prostitution that had been prohibited in the middle 1940s began to spring up again. The welfare and social services department created to rehabilitate child prostitutes started scaling down on its investigations of child prostitutes. By the early 1980s, street prostitution became a common sight on Allen Avenue, Ikeja and in some areas of Oshodi and later Kuramo Beach. In 1987, the Women's Center in Nigeria wrote a press release about the harassment, assault and rape of prostitute by law enforcement members.

Trans-national commercial sex work which started during British colonial West Africa began to grow into a transcontinental business in the 1980s. Starting in the mid-1980s, the trafficking of Women to European countries such as Italy began to gain traction. In many of the cases, there were examples of coercion. Coercion happened in situations whereby the women or adolescents to be trafficked were asked to swear an oath that was administered by an African religion or juju priest. Some personal items such as bodily fluids were taken by the priests for keeping or used to administer the oath and seal the agreement. When the women reach the country of destination they are immediately indebted to the trafficker for transport and lodging fees and will have to pay off the debt before they are freed, if ever. The United States Department of State Office to Monitor and Combat Trafficking in Persons ranks Nigeria as a 'Tier 2 Watch List' country.

Some scholars have stated that prostitution in Nigeria increased as a result of the adverse economic effect of the drop in oil price in the early 1980s followed by the implementation of structural adjustment programs in the middle 1980s. In the 1980s, brothels began to spring up in the cities and prostitutes who move into the city were charged daily rent for accommodation. The 1980s also contributed to the beginning of call-ups or part-time prostitution by young graduates and students. In Lagos during the early 1980s, politicians accommodated in housing estates such as 1004 requested the services of young students as call girls and spent lavishly on these students with trips abroad.

In Benin City, the red-light district is around Ugbague Street. This started to be an area of prostitution in the 1940s when young women from other states came to the area. The women are known locally as asewo.

=== 21st century ===
Commercial sex work and human trafficking continues to thrive in Nigeria. Based on the estimates of the United Nations Interregional Crime and Justice Research Institute, about 8,000 – 10,000 women of Nigerian descent practiced prostitution in Italy between 2000 and 2009. Cross-border commercial work also resorted to re-instating child trafficking for sex. A Nigerian envoy in Côte d'Ivoire noted the frequency of adolescent girls among Nigerian commercial workers in Abidjan.

Within Nigeria, the most common form of sex work is found within brothels or residences of sex workers. A steady rise in young students and unemployed graduates who use sex to earn income and acting as part-time prostitutes or call girls or sometimes called Aristo girls are changing the strategies used by sex workers. These young graduates and students use the services of pimps and call-ups as a modus of operation, while some frequent bars and restaurants.Some other forms of prostitution include: "sugar daddy syndrome", "night brides", and "floating prostitutes". Sugar Daddy Syndrome is usually when a young girl exchanges sexual favors in a relationship with a wealthy older man, these are not like hookups as the duration of this relationship is much longer. Night brides and floating prostitutes are the same as Aristo girls who are usually part time workers that walk around at night in major cities waiting to get picked up by mainly foreign customers.

In some cases, porters or hotel staff acts as pimps and links between upper class Nigerians and the call girls. The aristo girls mostly serve upper class citizens and foreigners are better paid than the sex workers in brothels. Almost two thirds of brothel and street sex workers are traders, bar girls, hair dressers or have a second type of job. Brothels are in virtually every major city in Nigeria and offer the cheapest form of service. The brothels are located in highly populated districts and slums within the city.

After the lockdown period COVID-19 pandemic in Nigeria, due to the rise of Internet Fraud and Scams (locally called Yahoo) perpetuated by many Nigerian Youths, many young Nigerian women have also sought quick means of earning large incomes outside traditional jobs and business. Due to the continual downward spiral of the Nigerian economy, general unemployment and changing moral standards of the current generation of youths, many young women between the ages of 19 and 29 including university students have turned to prostitution or its euphemistic title "Hookup" as a means to attain self-reliance or material/luxury lifestyles. Hookup is differentiated from traditional prostitution as it is discreet, more well-paying than average jobs/business and is harder to prosecute. Thanks to the internet and social media, Hookup is now very commonplace in virtually every part of Nigeria, most especially in cities like Lagos.

In 2003, the Trafficking in Person Prohibition Act was passed into law and an agency, National Agency for the Prohibition of Trafficked Persons was formed to handle human trafficking in the country.

==== Corporate prostitution ====
A different form of prostitution known as corporate prostitution, a relatively new phenomenon and mostly limited to financial institutions began to gain notability in the 2000s. In 2004, a bankers' union threatened to go on strike due to allegations that some female staffers sleep with men for accounts. Though most financial institutions do not force women to engage in sexual activities in order to meet financial targets it is implied that many banks are not against such actions. In 2010, hearings were held on the floor of the House of Representative about the Bill for an Act to Prohibit Corporate Prostitution and Exploitation of Women and for Other Matters Connected Therewith.

== Statistics on commercial sex workers ==
In a survey of commercial sex workers, almost two thirds or about 63% mentioned that they started commercial sex work before the age of 19. A majority of them (63%) work from brothels. Due to the negative public perception of commercial sex work, 88% of workers operate in cities far from their childhood home.

A majority came from households within the low income bracket. The sex workers are trained by an older professional or pimp prior to commencement on the job. Training lessons concern how to deal with a difficult man, STD's and self-defence. A large number of sex workers had limited information about STD's and a majority mentioned that they did not utilize a clinic for treatment.

UNAIDS estimate there to be 103,506 prostitutes in the country.

Sub-Saharan Africa has about 60% of the world's population that are living with AIDS even though they only make up 10% of the population. In 2002, there was a total of 3.47 million people living with AIDS in Nigeria. Female Nigerian sex workers have a 50% greater chance of contracting HIV/AIDS. Most of the contractions derive from heterosexual intercourse. In 2005, there was over 200,000 deaths due to HIV/AIDS.

== Sources ==
- Aderinto, Saheed (December 2014). When Sex Threatened the State: Illicit Sexuality, Nationalism, and Politics in Colonial Nigeria, 1900–1958. Urbana Champaign: University of Illinois Press. ISBN 978-0-252-03888-4.
- Akinyele, Rufus; Dietz, Ton (15 May 2019). Crime, Law and Society in Nigeria: Essays in Honour of Stephen Ellis. BRILL. ISBN 978-90-04-39628-9.
- Aluko-Daniels, Olufunke (2015). "At the Margins of Consent: Sex Trafficking from Nigeria to Italy". In Coluccello, Rino (ed.). Global perspectives on prostitution and sex trafficking. Palgrave Pivo.
- Amadiume, Ifi (2000). Daughters of the Goddess, Daughters of Imperialism: African Women Struggle for Culture, Power and Democracy. London: Zed Books.
- Nnabugwu-Otesanya, Bernadette (2005). "6" (PDF). A Comparative Study of Prostitutes in Nigeria and Botswana (Thesis). University of South Africa.
- Terfa, Ahom (2001). "Chapter 2: Adolescents' Prostitution and the Educational Prospects of the Girl-Child". In Dalla, Rochelle (ed.). Global perspectives on prostitution and sex trafficking. Lexington Books. pp. 100–110. ISBN 978-0-7391-3275-3.
- Aderinto, Saheed (2012), "Of Gender, Race, and Class: The Politics Of Prostitution In Lagos, Nigeria, 1923-1954" Frontiers: A Journal of Women Studies. VOL. 44 NO. 3: 71-92
- Aderinto, Saheed (April 22, 2011). """The Problem of Nigeria is Slavery, not White Slave Traffic": Globalization and The Politicization of Prostitution in Southern Nigeria, 1921-1955"". Canadian Journal of African Studies. Vol. 46 No.1: 71–92
- Oyefara, John Lekan (August 2007). ""Food Insecurity, HIV/AIDS Pandemic and Sexual Behaviour of female Cpmmercial Sex Workers in Lagos Metropolis, Nigeria"". Sahara-J: Journal of Social Aspects of HIV/AIDS. Vol. 4 No. 2: 626–635.
- Odunsi, Babafemi (2010). ""Romancing The Foe: The HIV Epidemic and The Case for A Pragmatic Stance on Prostitution And Illicit Drug Use in Nigeria"". Malawi Law Journal. Vol. 4 No. 2: 215–232.
- Bamgbose, Oluyemisi (2002). "Teenage Prostitution and the Future of the Female Adolescent in Nigeria". International Journal of Offender Therapy and Comparative Criminology: 572–575.
