= Osuigwe =

Osuigwe is an Igbo surname. Notable people with the surname include:

- Emmanuel Osuigwe (born 1952), Nigerian footballer
- Joseph Osuigwe Chidiebere (born 1985), Nigerian anti-human trafficking advocate, educator, and social entrepreneur
- Whitney Osuigwe (born 2002), American tennis player
