= Edo State Task Force Against Human Trafficking =

Task force in Edo State, Nigeria

Edo State Task Force Against Human Trafficking (ETAHT)

Agency overview
- Formed: 2017
- Jurisdiction: Edo State
- Agency executive: Prof Yinka Omorogbe
- Website: etaht.org

The Edo State Task Force Against Human Trafficking (ETAHT) is a Nigerian task force established by the Edo State Government to tackle human trafficking and irregular migration in the state, as well as the stigma that comes with it, State Task Force against human trafficking, is currently replicated in a host of southern states such as Ondo, Delta, Oyo, Lagos, Enugu, Ekiti States, etc. Prof. Yinka Omorogbe the Attorney-General and Commissioner for Justice, Edo State, is also the chairman of the task force. In the year 2017, Mr Godwin Obaseki inaugurated the state task force on anti-human trafficking. The members of the task force were inaugurated at the Government House in Benin City, the state capital. The Edo Task Force Against Human Trafficking is said to have received about 5,619 returnees from Libya en-route Europe from 2017 till date.

The task force is made up of representatives from security agencies, NGOs, NAPTIP MDAS, religious and traditional institutions.

== Mission ==
To end human trafficking and irregular migration (modern-day slavery), as well as help, reintegrate returnees into society.

== Objectives ==
- To reduce the problem of human trafficking in Edo state.
- To assist in the rehabilitation and reintegration of victims of human trafficking in Edo state
- To research and promote strategies in tackling the scourge of human trafficking in Edo state
- To work in collaboration with relevant agencies/bodies in addressing the problem of human trafficking in Edo State

== Committee members ==
- Professor (Mrs) Yinka Omorogbe - Chairperson of the task force
- Barr. Mrs Abieyuwa Oyemwense - Secretary to the Task Force

== Partners and affiliates ==
- International Centre for Migration Policy Development (ICMPD)
- ActionAid
- United Nations High Commissioner for Refugees (UNHCR)
- Italian Police
- Girls' Power Initiative (GPI)
- Pathfinders justice initiative
- International Organization for Migration (IOM)
