= Joel Bervell =

American medical doctor and social media content creator

- Born: Richmond, British Columbia
- Education: Yale University (BA); Boston University (MS); Washington State University (MD)
- Occupations: Medical doctor; content creator
- Known for: Highlighting racial disparities in medicine; combating medical misinformation; promoting health equity

Instagram information
- Page: joelbervell
- Followers: 882,000

TikTok information
- Page: joelbervell
- Followers: 903,600
- Last updated: September 08, 2026

Joel Bervell (/dʒoʊˈɛlbɛrˈvɛl/) is a Ghanaian-American physician, social media content creator, and advocate for health equity. He is known for his work highlighting racial biases in medicine and educating audiences about health misinformation, primarily through platforms such as TikTok and Instagram.

== Early life and education ==
Bervell was born in Richmond, British Columbia, Canada, to Ghanaian immigrant parents and raised in Mukilteo, Washington. He attended Yale University, earning a bachelor's degree in Molecular Cellular Developmental Biology. He later completed a Master's in Medical Science at Boston University, and enrolled at the Elson S. Floyd College of Medicine at Washington State University, where he graduated with a Doctor of Medicine degree in 2025.

== Career ==
Bervell gained prominence during medical school by using social media to highlight racial disparities and biases within the healthcare system. His TikTok videos focus on topics related to racial disparities and health misinformation, particularly those affecting minority populations. Examples of racial biases in medicine that he publicized included pulse oximeter levels, spirometry, and the GFR equation.

In 2021, Bervell was named one of TikTok's "Changemakers" and received the MACRO x TikTok Black Creatives Grant, which awarded $50,000 to ten Black creators to support their content development. Bervell's work has been featured by major media outlets such as The New York Times and Vox, where he shared strategies on how patients can advocate for themselves in medical settings. In 2024, Bervell was named a TED Fellow in recognition of his work promoting equitable healthcare education.

== Media projects ==
In collaboration with YouTube Health, Bervell co-created and hosts The Doctor Is In, an animated series designed to introduce children to medical careers and encourage diverse representation in healthcare. The show focuses on encouraging diverse representation in healthcare professions.

Bervell also hosts The Dose, a podcast produced by The Commonwealth Fund that presents fresh ideas, new perspectives, and compelling conversations about where healthcare is headed.

In addition to podcast work, Bervell hosts Myth or Medicine?, a series on MS NOW's streaming platform (formerly MSNBC) in which he addresses health misinformation and debunks medical myths.

== Advocacy and public speaking ==
Bervell frequently addresses the impact of racial biases in medicine at conferences, schools, and online platforms. He was recognized by the American Medical Association for his educational work on debunking health misinformation. He has also discussed challenges faced by content creators regarding misinformation amplification on social media platforms.

== Awards and recognition ==
Bervell has received several honors for his work, including:

- Won a 2025 and 2026 Webby Award in the Health, Wellness & Fitness category.
- Won a 2025 Peabody Award for his digital series "What Does Racial Bias in Medicine Look Like?"
- Named to the inaugural 2025 TIME100 Creators list recognizing the most influential digital voices
- Named to Forbes' 2025 30 Under 30 list in the Social Media category and recognized as an All Star Alumni (2026).
- Named a TED Fellow in 2024.
- Named to the Most Influential People of African Descent (MIPAD) Class of 2023, a UN-recognized initiative, in the Healthcare category.
- Named a "Revolutionary" by Scientific American in 2022.
- Recognized in the Rock Health Top 50 in Digital Health in 2022.
- Included in the National Minority Quality Forum's "40 Under 40 Leaders in Minority Health" in 2022.
- Recognized by the Smithsonian Channel as a "Cyclebreaker" in 2022.
- Featured as a "Changemaker" on TikTok's Discover List in 2021.
- Recipient of the MACRO x TikTok Black Creatives Grant in 2021.

== Personal life ==
In high school, Bervell co-founded the nonprofit organization Hugs for Ghana, which raises funds for medical and educational supplies for children in Ghana and other African countries. He has spoken publicly about using his background to inspire future physicians from underrepresented communities.

== See also ==
- Chidiebere Ibe
