= Fatima Waziri-Azi =

Nigerian pharmacist and professor

Fatima Waziri–Azi

Director General, NAPTIP
- Incumbent
- Assumed office 8 September 2021
- Preceded by: Senator Basheer Garba Muhammed

Former Head of Department of Public Law at the Nigerian Institute of Advanced Legal Studies

Personal details
- Education: Ahmadu Bello University, Zaria; Havard Business School, University of Pittsburgh
- Occupation: Lawyer

Fatima Waziri-Azi is a Nigerian lawyer and the Director General of the National Agency for the Prohibition of Trafficking in Persons (NAPTIP) of Nigeria. Before her appointment at NAPTIP she was an advisor on the rule of law to the President of Nigeria, Muhammadu Buhari. She is a former Head of Department of Public Law at the Nigerian Institute of Advanced Legal Studies and she is a woman rights advocate and a campaigner against domestic and sexual based violence.

== Education ==
Fatima Waziri-Azi attended the Ahmadu Bello University, Zaria, obtaining a bachelor's degree in Law in 2001. She is an Associate Member of the UK Chartered Institute of Arbitrators; and is a member of the Nigerian Bar Association, the New York County Lawyers Association, the Association of Women in Development and of Women in International Security.

== Career ==
From January 2005 to August 2006, Fatima Waziri-Azi worked as an attorney/senior program officer at the Women's Rights, Electoral Issues, and Justice Sector Reform Desk. From February 2016 to November 2018, she worked as a research and program officer at the Presidential Advisory Committee Against Corruption (PACAC). From November 2018, she worked as the Rule of Law Advisor to the President in the Office of the Vice President of the Federal Republic of Nigeria. In September 2021, Fatima Waziri-Azi was appointed Director-General of the National Agency for the Prohibition of Trafficking in Persons (NAPTIP).

== Awards ==
- University of Pittsburgh Sheth International Young Alumni Achievement Award
- Crouch – Kielsgard Scholarship of Intercultural Human Rights Program (2006)
- Siegfried Wiessner Essay Award (2007)
