= Chidiebere Ibe =

Nigerian medical illustrator (born 1996)

- Born: March 31, 1996 (age 30)
- Occupation: Medical illustrator
- Website: chidiebereibe.com

Chidiebere Sunday Ibe (born March 31, 1996) is a Nigerian medical student at Copperbelt University in Zambia, and the lead medical illustrator of the International Center for Genetic Disease at Brigham and Women's Hospital, Harvard Medical School. Ibe is from Ebonyi State in Nigeria. Having lost his mother to surgery for fibroid, he became passionate about medicine, especially as it relates to mothers and children. He is a self-taught medical illustrator. He learnt to draw medical illustrations using just a computer mouse. He is aspiring to be a pediatric neurosurgeon.

== Education and career ==
Ibe is a graduate of Chemistry from the University of Uyo, Akwa Ibom State. In 2020, he became a medical illustrator and graphics designer at the Journal of Global Neurosurgery, and lead medical illustrator of the International Center for Genetic Disease at Harvard Medical School. In 2021, he raised money for tuition to attend Kyiv Medical University in Ukraine, and enrolled as a first-year medical student the same year. However, due to the Russian invasion of Ukraine, he could not resume studies at Kyiv Medical University.

Ibe aspires to be a neurosurgeon. He is currently a Research Fellow, Association of Future African Neurosurgeons. He is a Pioneer Member of Community-Based Primary Health Care Community of Practice. He is currently the Medical Illustrator and Graphics Designer – Journal of Global Neurosurgery. Creative Director–Continental Association of African Neurosurgical Societies, (YNF). He is also Creative Director–Association of Future African Neurosurgeons, AFAN. He currently also a Junior Member – World Federation of Neurosurgical Societies, Global Neurosurgery Committee.

=== Medical illustrations ===
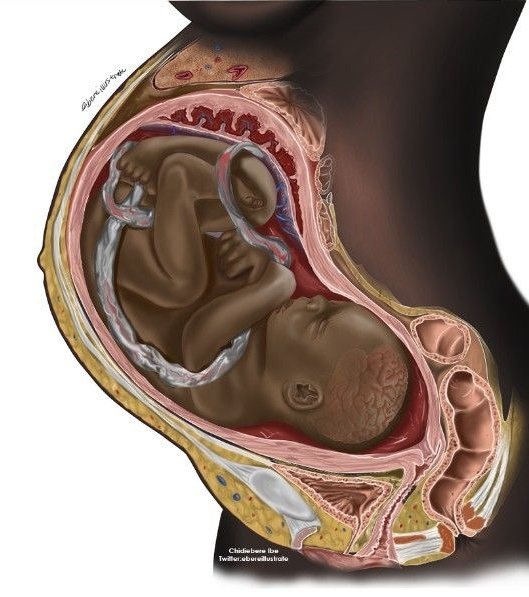
Fetus-in-womb illustration by Chidiebere Ibe

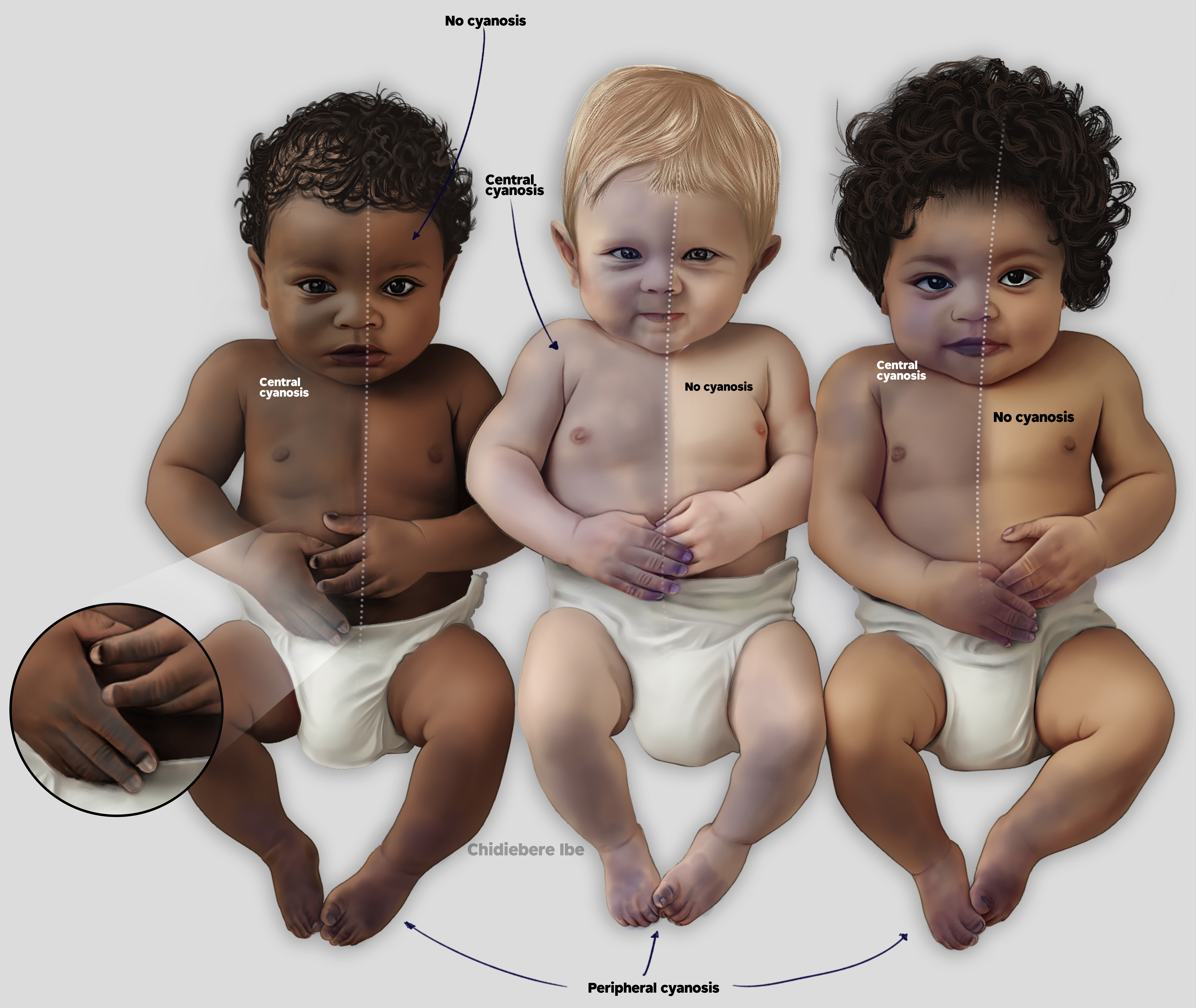
Appearance of cyanosis in children with different skin coloring

In July 2020, Ibe began drawing medical illustrations with Black people as subjects in response to the use of white subjects in the vast majority of such illustrations, hoping to promote diversity in the illustrations used by the medical textbooks used in medical training, and noting that "many conditions and signs look different based on the patient’s skin colour and therefore the black skin should be equally represented." He has illustrated various medical subjects including a fetus in a womb as well as dermatitis. In early December 2021, he went viral on social media as a result of his illustrations. His fetus-in-womb illustration had received more than 81,000 likes as of 8 December 2021. Ibe listed the artwork for sale as an NFT on OpenSea on January 13, 2022 for 10 Ether, worth roughly US$38,000 at the time. He eventually delisted the artwork from OpenSea following counsel from his advisers.

=== Projects and impact ===
To advance health equity, Chidiebere collaborated with Johnson & Johnson and Deloitte Digital to create what is expected to be the world's largest digital library of diverse medical illustrations - Illustrate Change It is expected that the digital library will continue to grow through contributions from other medical illustrators around the world.

Chidiebere was also one of six artists selected from around the world, and the only artist from Nigeria, to exhibit their arts on #claimingourspace at the High-Level Meeting on Road Safety held at the headquarters of the United Nations in New York City.

To raise more African change champions and deepen the drive for innovation amongst African youths, Chidiebere founded Championing Change Africa. Championing Change Africa launched in Uyo, Akwa-Ibom State, Nigeria on 15 October 2022 with a hybrid international conference that hosted some of Africa’s young leaders and innovators as speakers. The launch event was attended by over 1,000 participants physically and online, including figures such as Hakeem Belo-Osagie, Tunde Onakoya, Adenike Oladosu, John Amanam, and Manti Umoh. The conference is expected to be an annual convergence of change champions.

At the conference, Chidiebere issued a Public License for the Black Fetus Illustration to be used freely for the purposes of research, education, and advocacy. He said it was his hope that by that action, much-needed change will be made to healthcare systems to ensure diversity, equity, and inclusion in medicine. The Black Fetus Illustration has been used for free across various countries of the world for education and advocacy.

In recognition of Chidiebere's global impact in medicine and "for giving some much-needed visibility to Black patients—and chipping away at healthcare inequities", the Project Management Institute in 2022 awarded Chidiebere as one of PMI's Future 50 Rising Leaders Changing Our World.

=== Speaking engagements ===
Chidiebere is a regular speaker at global conferences. He delivered a TEDx Talk at the Geneva Graduate Institute in Switzerland, where he spoke about "How Diversity in Medical Illustrations Can Improve Healthcare Outcomes". In 2022, He also spoke (virtually) at the One Young World Summit in Manchester. At the 17th YES Meeting held in Porto, Portugal in September 2022, Chidiebere spoke about how black illustrations are underrepresented in medical textbooks and how ethnically diverse representation would improve healthcare outcomes.

=== Book ===
On 30 March 2023, Chidiebere published his first book titled "Beyond Skin: Why Representation Matters in Medicine". In Chidiebere's words "The journey from obscurity to greatness...is highlighted in part of the book. Being known for advocating for minority groups through visual creation, I reasoned: What is the spectrum on which we view people who do not look like us? Do we, as healthcare providers, base the efficacy of our services on the skin color of those we serve? to advocate for minorities through accurate visuals and storytelling? Health outcomes have declined because the foundation of our service to our population is how they feel".

== See also ==
- Joel Bervell
