= Women Trafficking and Child Labour Eradication Foundation =

Women Trafficking and Child Labour Eradication Foundation (WOTCLEF)
- Founded: 1999
- Type: Non-profit organization
- Headquarters: Abuja, Nigeria
- Location: Nigeria
- Services: Rescue and Rehabilitation of victims, Psycho-Social Support, Advocacy, Public Enlightenment, Reproductive and Sexual Health, and Youth Development.
- Fields: Anti-Human Trafficking, Child Labour Eradication, Rescue, Rehabilitation, Re-integration, Advocacy, Human Rights, Education, Eradicating Gender-Based Violence, Women Empowerment, and Youth Empowerment.
- Founder: Amina Titi Atiku-Abubakar
- Website: https://wotclef.org.ng/history.aspx

Women Trafficking and Child Labour Eradication Foundation (WOTCLEF) is an anti-human trafficking organization that attempts to stop human trafficking and child labour in Nigeria. WOTCLEF's areas of focus are human trafficking, child labour, abuse of the rights of women and children and HIV/AIDS. The organization played a role in establishing the National Agency for the Prohibition of Trafficking In Persons (NAPTIP) and the Network of Civil Society Organization Against Child Trafficking, Abuse and Labour (NACTAL).

WOTCLEF was founded in 1999 by Amina Titi Atiku-Abubakar, the wife of Atiku Abubakar, a former vice president of Nigeria. WOTCLEF was registered in 2000 as an Incorporated Trusteeship under the Nigeria Law. It has since been campaigning against human trafficking in Nigeria and inspiring change in other African countries.

== History ==
In 1986, as a postgraduate student, Titi Atiku noticed human trafficking on the streets of Italy. This led to her fight against human trafficking. Upon her return to Nigeria, she tried to fight human trafficking, but she could not do much as an individual. She wanted to establish an anti-human trafficking organisation.

In 1999, her husband was sworn in as the Vice President of Nigeria and she took the opportunity to establish WOTCLEF. At the time, HIV/AIDS was the major issue being tackled by development partners in Nigeria, so WOTCLEF embarked on awareness campaigns against human trafficking to politicians. This informed Nigerians about human trafficking and its effects.

Every state in Nigeria had a WOTCLEF branch with workers who served as watchdogs against human trafficking.

== Influence ==
WOTCLEF learned that the government must be involved in order to stop human trafficking. Its founder wanted to establish a law against human trafficking. WOTCLEF was instrumental in the formation of the National Agency for the Prohibition of Trafficking in Persons. In 2001, after work by legal and policy experts led by Justice Mary Odili, the first lady of Rivers State, WOTCLEF presented a bill to the National Assembly which was passed and signed into law by then-president Olusegun Obasanjo. The signing led to the establishment of the NAPTIP, which has been in operation since 2003. NAPTIP is involved in helping victims and providing rehabilitation and support for trafficked people and punishing the traffickers.

== International Activities and partners ==
Apart from its national programs, WOTCLEF has carried out campaign activities in different European countries and the US. The organization has collaborated with other organizations to rehabilitate victims of human trafficking.

WOTCLEF has partnered with the following national and international organizations:

- Care and Support Unit of the Federal Ministry of Labour and Productivity
- Nigerian Union of Road Transport Workers, International Labour Organization (ILO)/International Program on the Elimination of Child Labour (IPEC). United Nations Children's Fund (UNICEF)
- International Organization for Migration (IOM)
- National Agency for Prohibition of Trafficking In Persons and other related matters (NAPTIP)
- National Council of Women's Societies
- European Union

== Rehabilitation ==
The organization has treated over 500 cases of human trafficking and child labour by providing services such as food, shelter, and therapy. In 2015, WOTCLEF rehabilitated 20 trafficked victims between the ages of 18 and 22.
