= Perjury in Nigeria =

Perjury is an offence under the Criminal Code which is applicable in the Southern states of Nigeria. The offence of false evidence under the Penal Code, which is applicable in the Northern states of Nigeria, is equivalent.

== Offence of perjury under the Criminal Code ==
The offence of perjury is created by section 117 of the Criminal Code which reads:

Any person who, in any judicial proceeding, or for the purpose of instituting any judicial proceeding, knowingly gives false testimony touching any matter which is material to any question then depending in that proceeding, or intended to be raised in that proceeding, is guilty of an offence, which is called perjury.

It is immaterial whether the testimony is given on oath or under any other sanction authorised by law.

The forms and ceremonies used in administering the oath or in otherwise binding the person giving the testimony to speak the truth are immaterial, if he assent to the forms and ceremonies actually used.

It is immaterial whether the false testimony is given orally or in writing. It is immaterial whether the court or tribunal is properly constituted, or is held in the proper place, or not, if it actually acts as a court or tribunal in the proceeding in which the testimony is given.

It is immaterial whether the person who gives the testimony is a competent witness or not, or whether the testimony is admissible in the proceeding or not.

The offender cannot be arrested without warrant.

"Judicial proceeding"

Section 113 of the Criminal Code reads:

In this chapter, the term "judicial proceeding" includes any proceeding had or taken in or before any court, tribunal, commission of inquiry, or person, in which evidence may or may not be taken on oath.

Corroboration

Section 119 of the Criminal Code reads:

A person cannot be convicted of committing perjury, or of counselling or procuring the commission of perjury, upon the uncorroborated testimony of one witness.

In R Threlfall, it was held that section 13 of the Perjury Act 1911 imposes a requirement that the assignment of perjury must be proved or corroborated with two witnesses, or by one witness with proof of other material and relevant facts substantially confirming his testimony. In R v Mayhew a letter written by the defendant contradicting his sworn evidence is corroboration. The corroborated fact upon which the assignment is based, must be relative to that part of the matter sworn which is material to the matter before the court at the time the oath was taken.

Sentence

Section 118 of the Criminal Code reads:

Any person who commits perjury is liable to imprisonment for fourteen years. If the offender commits the offence in order to procure the conviction of another person for an offence punishable with death or with imprisonment for life, he is liable to imprisonment for life.

== Classification of perjury under Nigerian law ==
Nigerian penal legislation classifies offences affecting evidence e.g. (for example) false evidence, perjury and, fabricating evidence in exactly the same way and, punishment for all the grades of offences appears to be based on the enormity of the evil, which will follow, consequent upon the giving of such false evidence. The offence of perjury is restricted as it was under common law to the case of forensic false evidence. This offence is committed by a witness, lawfully 'sworn' in judicial proceedings, which makes a material statement, which he knows to be false, or without belief in its truth. The word 'oath' according to Turner is not limited to religious oaths, but includes the taking of legal affirmation or declaration. Oath as synonym of sworn is defined by section 36 of the Penal Code thus: 'The word 'oath' includes a solemn affirmation substituted by law for an oath, and any declaration required or authorized by law to be made before a Public Servant or to be used for the purpose of proof, whether in a Court of Justice or not.'

=== False oaths in non-judicial proceedings ===
In the classification of perjury, the Criminal Code, punishes every falsehood whether in judicial proceedings, or sworn or not, in exactly the same way. This tends to suggest that the Criminal Code punishes telling lies simpliciter and, lies told outside the confines of a Court of Law, even though, not sworn, are brought within the classification of perjury or false evidence. Under the Penal Code classification, such evidence must have been given under oath or under express provision of law compelling a person to state the truth. But having regard to section 36 of the same Code, such statement may be made in order to proof a particular fact in a Court of Law or not. The Criminal Code in classifying false evidence or the offence of perjury made no distinction between statements made under oath; under the Penal Code, if the statement is made in a judicial proceeding oath is a sine qua non-for the statement to assume the character of false evidence or perjury, if its falsehood is proved. Under section 1 (1) of the English Perjury Act 1911, the statement to amount to perjury must have been made under oath. Under these laws it is irrelevant whether or not the witness's statement is false at all. The witness renders himself liable to punishment by simply making assertions, false or true, which he does not positively believe to be true. In the words of Turner 'a man who tells the truth quite unintentionally is morally a liar.' This proposition was exemplified by the conviction of a Jewish juryman who concurred in a verdict that Christ was born of a virgin, was held to have committed perjury, whilst his Christian colleague were found not to be guilty.

== Perjury or false evidence ==
=== Definition ===
Section 156 of the Penal Code defines giving false evidence thusly:

Whoever, being legally bound by an oath or by any express provision of law to state the truth or being bound by law to make declaration upon any subject, makes any statement, verbally or otherwise, which is false in a material particular and which he either knows or believes to be false or does not believe to be true, is said to give false evidence.

The offence is defined under section 329 of the Sokoto State Shariah Penal Code, thus "whoever makes any statement, verbally or otherwise, which is false in a material particular and which he either know or believes to be false or does not believe to be true, is said to give false evidence."

== Elements ==
The following matters may be regarded as the elements of the offence:

=== Lawfully bound on oath ===
It seems that under the Nigerian Penal Code, for a witness to be prosecuted for giving false evidence, his testimony must be required by law to be on oath and, such testimony may be verbal or otherwise. But having regard to section 36 of the same Penal Code as noted earlier, evidence given under an affirmation or solemn declaration is also regarded as evidence given on oath. In interpreting the term 'By an oath' under section 191 of the Indian Penal Code, which has same wording with section 156 of the Penal Code, Thakore and Vakil apparently referring to an Indian court's decision, argued that an oath or solemn affirmation is not a sine qua non-to the offence of perjury or giving false evidence. This reasoning may be correct but it is submitted that such a person must either legally be bound by an oath or by express provision of the law to state the truth or must be bound by law to make declaration. If otherwise, it is doubtful if a court of justice under the Nigerian Penal Code jurisdiction can reasonably find an accused guilty for the offence of giving false evidence for statements not made under those circumstances.

With regard to the competence of the court before which the oath or affirmation is given the Penal Code is silent on this. However, if the position in the Indian Penal Code is to be used as a guide for section 156 of the Penal Code, it means that if the oath was administered by a court that has no jurisdiction over the case in which the false evidence occurred, the proceeding will be coram non-judice.

Under section 117 of the Criminal Code, it is immaterial that the court, tribunal, commission of inquiry or person before whom the oath was administered is properly constituted, or held in the proper place, provided that the court or tribunal, commission of inquiry or person acted as such in the proceeding in which the testimony is given. This seems to suggest that under the Criminal Code, perjury may be committed though the court had no jurisdiction in the particular case in which the statement was made.

The position under the Nigerian Penal Code and, that of the Indian Penal Code is consistent with the position under common law, where it used to be a requirement that the oath must have been taken before a competent jurisdiction, that is before same person or persons authorized by English law to take cognizance of the proceeding in or for which the oath is given, and administer the oath. It must be pointed out that under the Penal Code, even if the oath is improperly administered by an incompetent person, the offence is still committed, if the person who made the false statement were bound by an 'express provision of the law to state the truth.'

Turner enumerated those instances under common law, when the absence of 'competent jurisdiction' will result to the administration of oath on a witness being declared invalid, hence could not afford grounds for the prosecution of any person for perjury:

Thus a false oath taken in a court of requests, in a matter concerning lands, was held not to be indictable, that court having no jurisdiction in such cases. The court must be properly constituted and the evidence must be taken before person or persons constituting the court. And perjury could not be assigned on an oath taken before persons acting merely in a private capacity, or before those who take upon them to administer oaths of a public nature, without legal authority for their so doing, or before those who are legally authorized to administer some kinds of oaths but not those which happen to be taken before them, or even before those who take upon them to administer justice by virtue of an authority colourable, but in truth unwarrantable and merely void...

'Judicial proceeding' is defined by section 9 of the Penal Code thus: 'judicial proceedings include any proceeding in the court which it is lawful to take evidence on oath.' Section 180 of the Evidence Act dealing with taking of oral evidence, provides that 'save as otherwise provided in section 182 and 183 of this Act all oral evidence in any judicial proceedings must be given upon oath or affirmation administered in accordance with the provisions of the Oath Act.' Section 229 (1) of the Criminal Procedure Code provides that 'Every witness giving evidence in any inquiry or trial under this Criminal Procedure Code may be called upon to take an oath or make a solemn affirmation that he will speak the truth.'

Sub-section 2 of section 229 of the same Code states:

The evidence of any person, who by reason of youth or ignorance or otherwise is in the opinion of the court unable to understand the nature of an oath, may be received without the taking of an oath or making of an affirmation if in the opinion of the court he is possessed of sufficient intelligence to justify the reception of the evidence and understands the duty of speaking the truth.

Section 230 of the Code prohibits compelling a witness to take oath or make affirmation. The section provides:

No witness if he refused to take an oath or make a solemn affirmation shall be compelled to do so or asked his reason for so refusing but the court shall record in such a case the nature of the oath or affirmation proposed, and the fact of the refusal of the witness together with any reason which the witness may voluntarily give his refusal.

Furthermore, section 231 of the CPC provides 'a witness shall take an oath make a solemn affirmation in such a manner as the court considers binding on his conscience.'

With regard to swearing of Muslims, section 232 provides that:

No person of the Moslem faith shall be required to take an oath in any court unless

(a) He has been given an opportunity to complete the ablutions prescribed by the Moslem faith for persons taking oath on the Holy Qu’ran; and
(b) The oath is administered by a person of the Moslem faith; and
(c) The oath is taken upon a copy of the Holy Quran printed in the Arabic language.

By virtue of the definition of judicial proceedings under the Penal Code, it is clear that all proceedings in the ordinary courts of law, courts martial and tribunal and, quasi-judicial bodies where the taking of oath is a sine qua non-for a witness to testify, are judicial proceedings. Under the Criminal Code, oath is not material, provided the evidence was given before any body authorized to conduct a hearing or an inquiry over a matter. Therefore, statements made before such bodies, if false, can furnish sufficient grounds to prosecute the maker for perjury or for giving false evidence under the Codes. However, a cursory look at section 113 of the Criminal Code, section 180 of the Evidence Act and, section 230 of the CPC reveals a conflict. This is because while the former section permits a witness to testify before a court or tribunal, commission of inquiry or any person on oath or otherwise, section 180 of the Evidence Act makes it mandatory for all oral evidence to be given on oath and, section 230 of the CPC permits a witness to testify if he elects to do so, not on oath or by affirmation. In such a situation, it is important, for the trial judge, the magistrate, the prosecution or defence counsel, to ensure that a statement is extracted from such a witness, which indicates that he agreed to tell the truth in his testimony. If this is not done, the testimony of such a witness may not furnish enough ground to prosecute him/her for perjury or for giving false evidence. Therefore, where a witness who refused to testify on oath or by affirmation, did not undertake to speak the truth, the entire process in such a proceeding may be described as a drama without any intent of it being basis for a criminal prosecution.

The above notwithstanding the position of the law by virtue of section 1 (2) of the English Perjury Act and, section 9 of the Penal Code, is that while evidence could only he held to have been given in a judicial proceedings, if it was given before a body authorized to receive and examine evidence on oath, such a consideration is immaterial under section 113 of the Criminal Code. In the English case of Shaw where licensing justices held a special preliminary meeting for which there was no statutory authority, they had no power to administer an oath, the proceeding was held not to be judicial one. Equally, where an oath was administered on a witness by a person authorized by law to do so, there can be no perjury, if that person subsequently withdrew. This was decided in Lloyd where a witness was sworn in bankruptcy before a county court registrar, but examined in another room in the absence of the registrar; no perjury was committed in the absence of the registrar who had the competence to receive evidence on oath.

Under section 117 of the Criminal Code unlike section 156 of the Penal Code and section 1 (1) of the English Perjury Act, the false statement may either be made in an ongoing proceeding or in a case, in which judicial proceeding is either threatened or imminent. Also where a witness in a judicial proceeding, contradicts his earlier statement cannot furnish a ground for the conviction of an accused person. The Nigerian Supreme Court stated so in the case of Joshua v The Queen, where the accused, a Customary Court President, was charged with demanding and with receiving, money to favour a litigant. A witness, who is said to be the go-between when first testifying before a magistrate, denied the corruption; later after a prosecution was begun against him for making a false statement as the police, he testified against the accused. The trial judge treated the witness and the accused as accomplice and, after warning himself of the danger of convicting the accused on such evidence, found their evidence to be true, and convicted the accused. When the trial judge re-examined the witness, in answer to the trial judge, he said there was no difference between his original written statement to the police and his evidence at the trial. The statement was not produced. In allowing the appeal, the Supreme Court held:

The judge erred in receiving evidence on the contents of the written statement he should have disregarded it in toto the evidence of M.S, who had committed perjury, as unreliable, and then asked himself whether there was enough other evidence for finding the appellant guilty; and as it was uncertain whether the judge would have convicted on the litigant's evidence alone the conviction would be quashed.

The requirement that the false statement must have occurred under oath, in a judicial proceeding, which is a sine qua non-for the offence of perjury under sections 156 of the Penal Code and 1 (1) of the English Perjury Act 1911, does not have a general application in all cases. For instance, oath may be a first step in the initiation of the proceeding, for example, swearing to an affidavit in support of a motion or any fact contained in a deposition duly sworn. According to Turner, ‘ In the case of perjury in an affidavit or the like, the offence is committed when the deponent takes oath to the truth of the affidavit, and it is unnecessary to aver or prove that the affidavit was filed or in any way used.

It is pertinent to emphasis here, that under common law, the only oath required is one 'calling Almighty God to witness that his testimony is true.' Such oath need not be in accordance with the doctrine or tenets of Christianity. It was sufficient if the witness believed in God and, swears in accordance with his religious belief. The purpose of such oaths had the effect of the witness renouncing the mercy and imprecates the vengeance of Heaven if he did not speak the truth. Such oath had the idea of binding the conscience of the witness, and presupposes a religious sanction if the witness told a lie on oath. Such a requirement has been displaced now, in that the solemnity of the occasion when an oath is administered by a witness in a judicial proceeding, no longer implies a religious sanction, but a legal sanction. This can be deduced from section 191 of the Criminal Code:

Any person who, on any occasion on which a person making a statement touching any matter is required by law to make it on oath, or under some sanction which may by law be substitute for an oath, or is required to verify it by solemn declaration or affirmation makes a statement touching such manner, in any material particular, is to his knowledge false, and verifies it on oath, or under such sanction or by solemn declaration or affirmation; is guilty of a felony, and is liable to imprisonment for seven years.

The Evidence Act has also modified the common law rule which required a witness to swear in accordance with his religious belief. Section 182 (1) of the Evidence Act provides:

Any court may on any occasion if it thinks it just and expedient, receive, the evidence, though not given upon oath, of any person declaring that the taking of any oath whatsoever is, according to his religious belief ought not, in the opinion of the court, to be admitted to give evidence upon oath.

Section 39 of the Sokoto State Shariah Penal Code include in the definition of an oath, the swearing in the name of Allah or by his attributes and, a solemn affirmation substituted by law for an oath. This means that witnesses in a Shariah Court are given option to affirm instead of swearing in the name of God. It also means that those witnesses in a Shariah Court who may object to swearing on oath in accordance with section 182 (1) of the Evidence Act, are also at liberty to affirm, instead of swearing. However, the common law position on swearing in the name of God, is clearly modified by section 117 of the Criminal Code thus: 'The forms and ceremonies used in administering the oath or in otherwise binding the person giving the testimony to speak the truth are immaterial, if the assents to the forms and ceremonies actually used.'

=== Material statement in that proceeding ===
All the statutes referred to above, require that the statement must be material to the proceeding in question, although the Criminal Code extends the doctrine to cover cases in which proceeding is either threatened or imminent.

The materiality of the statement need not be intrinsic to the evidence in question. It is sufficient, if it is capable of facilitating the judge's other evidence which had an intrinsic materiality. This has been explained by Turner, thus:

... so that trivial details, mentioned by a witness in giving his account of a transaction, may become important by their leading the jury to believe that his knowledge of the transaction is complete, and his evidence therefore likely to be accurate on the same ground, all statement made by a witness as to matters that affect his credibility are material, e.g. his denial of having been convicted of crime. And even if the false evidence were legally inadmissible yet this need not prevent its being regarded as 'material' enough to form the subject of an indictment for perjury. There is, for instance, a rule that when a witness answered answers are to be taken as final, so that no other witness can legally be brought to contradict them. Yet if, by a breach of this rule, some second witness be permitted to give this contradiction, and he gave it falsely, he may be indicted for perjury; for, so soon as the contradiction was admitted, it did affect the credit given to the previous witness, and so became 'material.'

It seems that the question is not just failure to tell the truth, that determines the materiality of the statement. Even acts of a witness which obstructed proceeding during cross-examination, may be held to be material. In Millward, where a police officer denied having sought the assistance of his colleague in identifying in the court room a person charged with driving offences, that act was held by the English Court of Appeal as material statement in that it brought to a halt a line of cross-examination, went to the heart of the case, in that the stopping of the cross-examination might very have affected the outcome of the case. However, questions asked during cross-examination, which purpose is to impugn the credibility of a witness as to his previous convictions have been held not to be material. In R v Griepe, accused gave evidence on behalf of the Crown in 1970 on a preliminary objection into a charge of blackmail. The counsel to the alleged blackmailer asked the accused questions as to his credit with regard to his previous convictions between the year 1947 and 1950, which the accused denied but later admitted. The accused was subsequently charged with perjury relating to his evidence at the Magistrate Court in the proceedings for blackmail. The court inter-alia held that the answers given by the accused relating to those convictions not being relevant to those proceedings could not form the basis of a prosecution for perjury.

Whether a statement is material or immaterial seems to be a recondite point. Even as the questions relative to the credibility of a witness, a clear illustration of its operation seems not to be an easy point to determine. Smith argues that questions put to a witness under cross-examination which goes solely to his credit and, he denies it, the general rule is that his answer is final and evidence is not admissible to rebut his denial. Based on this reasoning, the court held in Murray that the accused was not indictable for false statement made when he was permitted to testify in rebuttal of a witness's denial under cross-examination. In Gibbons the court took a contrary view. In that case, decided by eleven judges (with Martin B. and Cropton J. dissenting), it was held that the accused was guilty, notwithstanding that his statement is inadmissible in law, but logically relevant to the question to be decided, that is the witness's credibility. The court relied upon Hawkins "…though the evidence signify nothing to the merits of the cause and is immaterial, yet, if it has a direct tendency to material, it is equally criminal in its own nature, and equally tends to abuse the administration of justice, and there does not seem to be any reason why it should not be equally punishable".

It is submitted that once a person has been lawfully sworn to tell the truth in any judicial proceeding, such a person is under a sacred duty to say nothing, but the truth. If he tells a lie on oath, the question as to whether or not such a statement is immaterial to the main issue before the court ought not to arise. This is because the lie was told in a 'judicial proceeding,’ where he had sworn to say nothing, but the truth. So whether such deliberate falsehood, will corroborate evidence, as to make it a material statement, for the purpose of prosecuting the maker for perjury, should also not arise. It is in view of this, that Muale, J, in Phillpots, said: ‘... it is not material to the judicial proceeding, and it is not necessary that it should have been relevant and material for the issue being tried...’ This proposition differ from the position under Nigerian penal laws and, under the English Perjury Act. Maule, J, proposition in Phillpots is approved by Stephen, who contended that: 'it is difficult to imagine a case in which a person would be under any temptation to introduce into his evidence a deliberate lie about a matter absolutely irrelevant to the matter before the court. At common law a person who made a statement which was true, had no defence, it he believed such a statement to be false, or he was just reckless as to the truth or falsity of the statement. This is still the position under section 1 of the English Perjury Act 1911 and, under section 156 of the Penal Code. This position of the law, according to Smith, means that every statement in any judicial proceeding is the actus reus of perjury. This suggests that once such a statement is made, the burden on the prosecution is to prove that the accused made it with mens rea.

But there are clear situations where the evidence which formed the basis for the assignment of perjury is clearly unconnected to the main issue in dispute. In that case the materiality requirement as a criterion for culpability is then justified. In the case of Omoregie v D.P.P, three assignments were made against the accused (appellant) in a civil case and, the question arose as to whether those assignments were material to main issue in dispute, and whether the appellant made the false statements knowingly. The dispute centered on whether or not the appellant held himself out or was employed as an agent personally responsible for monies on all cement sold out to customers on credit. The first count of the perjury charge was with regard to the money the Plaintiff (a company in Germany) transferred to the appellant in Lagos. The appellant said in his evidence that the alleged money had been transferred before his return to Lagos from Germany. Exhibit 'AA' and 'BB' which were letters written by the appellant corroborated his evidence that he was still awaiting a transfer of the money two weeks after his return to Lagos. In view of the time lapse between the period these letters were written and the period the appellant gave his oral evidence the Supreme Court was of view that the appellant memory might have been playing him false. Apart from the lapse of time which affects memory the court was also of the opinion that even if the evidence on this point was false it may not be a basis for culpability unless it is shown that such evidence was deliberately made with knowledge of its falsehood. And more importantly the court found that even if the evidence was false it was not material to the issue in dispute.

The second count for the perjury charge was with regard to the evidence of the appellant that he (the appellant) and the respondent agreed not to start business until the formation of a new Company by the appellant. In his evidence the appellant later corrected himself that this was untrue. The court found that the appellant's difficulties in giving a straightforward evidence about the formation of the new Company was based on the apparent difficulties or untold problems he faced in his business and, the fact that in one occasion cement was shipped to him in his name in Lagos from Germany by the Plaintiff and in another breath cement was shipped to him in the new Company's name. The court found as a fact that this inconsistency in the shipments of cement accounted to the appellant's inability to answer the question put to him during cross examination. At any rate the court found that the evidence as to whether or not the parties were not to start business until the new Company was formed was not material to the question whether the appellant held himself out as the agent personally responsible for monies on all cement sold out to customers on credit.

The third count for the perjury charge was with regard to the conflicting statement of the appellant that he had nothing to do with the first shipments of cement, whereas Exhibit 'R' proved otherwise. Exhibit 'R' is a letter dated 16 October 1956 wherein the appellant was informed of the shipments of the cement. But the court found it puzzling what the appellant meant when he said 'having nothing to do with the first shipments of cement.' The court was therefore of opinion that the appellant should have been questioned on this point in order to clarify exactly what he meant by that statement. This informed the court's decision that assignment of perjury on the statement that was unclear and, which the appellant was not asked to clarify was wrong. It was in view of the above misconception of the basis for the assignment of perjury that the Supreme Court held discharging the appellant that: On the three matters which the learned Judge complained of and upon which he assigned perjury, it cannot be said that if they are untrue, the appellant knowingly said what he did say knowing them to be untrue, nor can it be said that on the whole evidence that any of them is material to the question at issue in the case before the learned Judge.

==== Assignment of perjury ====
In any perjury charge courts are enjoined to specifically set out the assignment of perjury by telling the accused what amount to perjury from his sworn evidence. This is essential and, in particular when a court adopts a summary procedure to commit an accused to prison for perjury. Where the accusation or even the gist of the offence is not clearly discernible from the record a conviction secured in such circumstances is most likely to be set aside on appeal. In the case of Chang Hangkin and Others v Piggot and Another the Privy Council rescinded the committal order against the appellants because the appellants was not given an opportunity to give reasons why the summary measure was being taken against them. This case also decided that it is not essential to set out the assignment of perjury in the summary procedure provided the accused is made aware of the pith of the charge against him.

Therefore, once it is shown that an accused was fully aware of the statement he made which formed the basis of the assignment of perjury or false evidence an appeal on this ground will certainly fail. In the Nigerian case of Gesellschaft v Attorney General in re Biney guidelines of what the courts should do in such cases were enunciated as follows: 'The proper procedure in such cases is for the Court 'to call up the witness and address him to the following effect:’ 'It appears to this Court that you have been guilty of perjury in that you have falsely sworn so and so (giving the substance of the allegation of perjury).’ The West African Court of Appeal in the case of R v Otubu stated that failure to follow this procedure does not mean that a conviction will automatically be set aside. That court's opinion on this as quoted by Sasegbon reads:

The fact that the witness has been so addressed, and his 'answer, if any, should be recorded in the notes of the 'presiding Judge.' We endorse this declaration as to the procedure, which should be followed in such cases. If however there is a failure to follow that procedure it appears from the cases referred to that the conviction will not be quashed provided (a) that the accused was given an opportunity to show cause and (b) that he knew the gist of the accusation made. In the Hong Kong case of Chang Hangkin the conviction was quashed because (b) was not present, whilst in the Gold Coast case in re Nunoo the conviction was upheld because both (a) and (b) were present. In the present case (a) is present but (b) is not and the conviction therefore cannot stand. The appeal is allowed and the order of committal is rescinded and the appellant is discharged.

=== Oath ===
In the dim past, taking of oath was dreaded for fear of supernatural sanctions. In that epoch, oath taking was an effective means of discovering the truth. Parties who were unsure of their claims or assertions refrained from taking the oath. That made matters simple and straight forward as it was easy to assume that refusal to take on oath was an admission of the allegation made against the defaulter. In this century, it seems that the efficacy of oath as a means of discovering the truth has been lost to the propensity of witnesses to perjure themselves. How to prevent perjury and, what remedies should be made available for the victims of perjured evidence came under focus in 1970(?) in the Council of Justice Committee. In Part III of the Report, the Justice Committee felt that oath or affirmation is still necessary not only for ensuring high standards of truth but also as a remainder of the solemnity of the occasion, it however, was categorical that oath should be abolished, in that:

Many of those who take a religious oath do so largely as a matter of form (or) because they think they are more likely to be believed if they take the oath, the oath 'is only too often regarded as a necessary formality and rattled off with little outward sign of sincerity or understanding of its implications...We therefore think the time has come for the oath in its present form to be abolished and replaced by a form of undertaking which is more meaningful, more generally acceptable and more likely to serve the cause of justice. All witnesses should be required to make same solemn affirmation so that there is no distinction in the respect that is accorded them.'

=== Mens Rea ===
Under the Criminal Code, mens rea and actus reus as common law concepts are no longer relevant in the interpretation of the provision of the Code. Instead, the expressions 'voluntary act' and 'intention' have replaced them under that Code. This is by virtue of section 24 of the same Code which in defining criminal responsibility did not use these Latin expressions. Therefore, under the Criminal Code where a prohibited act results from the voluntary and intentional act of the perpetrator there is responsibility for the commission of such prohibited act. This means that under the Criminal Code, for a person to be liable for perjury, it must be established that the false statement was made intentionally as against statement made inadvertently or by mistake. This means that the accused must have made the statement which he knows to be false. Under the Penal Code and, the English Perjury Act, an additional element is required, that is, the accused apart from knowing of the falsity of the statement, he does not also believe it to be true. Under the Perjury Act, willfulness is also an essential element. This means that the false statement must have been made deliberately.

Under both Codes, prove of intention or recklessness, will suffice. In an Indian case of Ratansi Daya, it was held that if the statement is literally true but owing to suppression or certain other facts, a wrong-inference was drawn, the accused cannot be convicted. This means that negligence as to the falsity of the statement will not suffice. According to Hawkins:

It seemeth that no one ought to be found guilty there of without clear proof, that the false oath alleged against him was taken with some degree of deliberation; for if, upon the whole circumstances of the case it shall appear probable, that it was owing rather to the weakness than perverseness of the party, as where it was occasioned by surprise, or inadvertency, or a mistake of the true state of the question; it cannot be hard to make it amount to voluntary and corrupt perjury

=== Corroboration ===
Corroboration which is a time honoured precaution which the common law imposed in prosecutions is not a requirement under the Penal Code.

== Conclusion ==
It is submitted that the offence of perjury arises as a result of a breach of an oath, affirmation or declaration duly sworn in a judicial proceedings, or as observed, by the breach of a witness who declined from being sworn on oath, or being affirmed, of his undertaking to speak the truth. The fact that statutorily, a witness is allowed to testify in a judicial proceeding, if he elects not to be sworn or be affirmed, supports the position under the Criminal Code which extends the application of the law to every falsehood, whether or not made on oath. Under that Code therefore, the solemnity of the occasion is immaterial, as the Code treats telling of lies in the course of judicial proceedings and, outside judicial proceedings, as a criminal offence. The position of the law under that Code suggests that the underlining objective for the proscription of the offence of perjury requires a re-examination. This is because perjury means that a person has proved false to the oath he has taken. It is on this basis that the charge that the person violated the solemnity of his oath is based or assigned, which is termed the assignment of perjury. There may be several assignments which may exist in one oath duly sworn, but it is only one perjury in that proceeding that can be committed.
