= American Criminal Justice Association–Lambda Alpha Epsilon =

American criminal justice fraternity

- ACJA-ΛΑΕ
- Founded: December 18, 1937; 88 years ago Hayward, California, US
- Type: Professional
- Affiliation: Independent
- Status: Active
- Scope: National (US)
- Publication: ACJA/LAE Journal; ACJA/LAE National Newsletter
- Chapters: 121 (69 active)
- Members: 4,500 active
- Headquarters: 3211 Fitzgerald Drive; Montgomery, Texas 77356; United States
- Website: www.acjalae.com

American Criminal Justice Association–Lambda Alpha Epsilon (ACJA-ΛΑΕ) is a coed professional fraternity in the field of criminal justice based in the United States. It was established in 1937 in Hayward, California.

== History ==
Lambda Alpha Epsilon held its first meeting in Hayward, California on December 18, 1937. Initially, it was a professional fraternity for those employed in law enforcement. It was essentially a regional organization, with all members and chapters being located in California.

Its first annual convention was held between June 13 and 15, 1938 in Lodi, California. In 1945, membership was open to individuals who worked full-time for enforcement agencies or as instructors in police training courses in state colleges. When the School of Criminology was established at the University of California, Berkeley in 1950, the group decided to expand its membership to criminal justice students and chartered the Epsilon chapter.

In 1952, moved outside of California with the establishment of the Zeta chapter at Indiana University. The next year, a chapter for women was established in Sacramento. At the 1957 annual meeting, the fraternity voted to open its membership to all aspects of the criminal justice field.

At the Annual Grand Chapter Business Meeting in 1970 in Anaheim, California, the name was changed from Lambda Alpha Epsilon, Professional Law Enforcement Fraternity to Lambda Alpha Epsilon, Professional Criminal Justice Fraternity. In February 1973, it was proposed that the name be changed to Lambda Alpha Epsilon – American Criminal Justice Association, which was then adopted. The name was adopted later in the year. In 1976, the name was reversed to "American Criminal Justice Association – Lambda Alpha Epsilon."

== Symbols and traditions ==
The fraternity's name was selected for the letters ΛΑΕ which represent the Greek words Lambano (to detect and apprehend), Anakrinen (to adjudicate), and Exorthoun (to rehabilitate).

The Lambda Alpha Epsilon emblem is a hexagon with the Greek letters ΛΑΕ across its center. Below the letters is a spider web that represents "the great complexity of criminal activity". Above the letter are a pair of scales that symbolize justice and a six-pointed star which represents the "light of knowledge".

The ACJA/LAE Journal and the ACJA/LAE National Newsletter are published semiannually.

== Activities ==
ACJA-ΛΑΕ seeks "to improve the administration of criminal justice through educational activities, to foster professionalism within agencies of criminal justice, to encourage better communication and expansion of higher education in the field of criminal justice, and to aid and assist all persons to prevent criminal activity." The fraternity holds a week-long national convention that includes seminars and written, physical, and practical competitions. It also awards annual scholarships to members.

== Membership ==
Membership in ACJA-ΛΑΕ is open to individuals who are committed to the field of criminal justice through their profession or education, those who are retired from a career in criminal justice, or those who volunteer in areas related to the administration of criminal justice. As of 2007, the fraternity has 4,500 active members.

== Chapters ==
As of 2024, there are 69 active chapters of ACJA-ΛΑΕ. Collegiate chapters are located at colleges and universities with criminal justice programs. Professional chapters are located geographically or at an agency for criminal justice professionals.

In the following list, active chapters are indicated in bold and inactive chapters are in italics.

Chapter	Charter date and range	Type	Institution	Location	Status	Ref.
Alpha First	December 18, 1937	Professional		Hayward, California	Reassigned	
**Alpha**		Professional		Martinez, California	Active	
Beta First	April 25, 1941	Professional		Los, Angeles, California	Reassigned	
**Beta**		Collegiate	Greenville Technical College	Greenville, South Carolina	Active	
Gamma	c. 1945	Professional		San Jose, California	Inactive	
Delta	c. 1945	Professional		San Francisco, California	Inactive	
Epsilon	1950	Collegiate	University of California, Berkeley	Berkeley, California	Inactive	
Zeta	1952	Collegiate	Indiana University		Inactive	
Eta	c. 1950	Professional		Sacramento, California	Inactive	
Theta	1953	Professional	Women's Chapter	Sacramento, California	Inactive	
Iota	1956		Sacramento State University	Sacramento, California	Inactive	
**Lambda**		Collegiate	Florida State University	Tallahassee, Florida	Active	
**Mu**		Collegiate	California State University, Los Angeles	Los Angeles, California	Active	
Nu					Inactive	
Xi					Inactive	
**Omicron**		Collegiate	University of Louisville	Louisville, Kentucky	Active	
Pi					Inactive	
Rho					Inactive	
Sigma					Inactive	
Tau					Inactive	
Upsilon					Inactive	
Phi					Inactive	
**Chi**		Collegiate	Truman State University	Kirksville, Missouri	Active	
Psi					Inactive	
**Delta Chi**		Collegiate	Sam Houston State University	Huntsville, Texas	Active	
**Iota Sigma**		Collegiate	Indiana State University	Terre Haute, Indiana	Active	
Pi Kappa	1961	Collegiate	Cerritos College	Norwalk, California	Inactive	
**Pi Chi**		Collegiate	Florida State University Panama City	Panama City, Florida	Active	
**Sigma Zeta**		Collegiate	Clemson University	Clemson, South Carolina	Active	
**Sigma Pi**		Collegiate	Long Beach City College	Long Beach, California	Active	
**Sigma Chi**		Collegiate	California State University, Sacramento	Sacramento, California	Active	
**Chi Nu**		Collegiate	Radford University	Radford, Virginia	Active	
**Psi Omega**		Collegiate	University of New Haven	West Haven, Connecticut	Active	
**Delta Psi Chi**		Collegiate	Boise State University	Boise, Idaho	Active	
**Eta Alpha Mu**		Professional		Gilroy, California	Active	
**Alpha Epsilon Phi**		Collegiate	Texas State University	San Marcos, Texas	Active	
**Alpha Sigma Omega**		Collegiate	Jacksonville State University	Jacksonville, Alabama	Active	
**Alpha Upsilon Beta**		Collegiate	University of Arkansas	Fayetteville, Arkansas	Active	
**Alpha Upsilon Lambda**		Professional		Danville, Virginia	Active	
**Alpha Phi Kappa**		Collegiate	Lamar University	Beaumont, Texas	Active	
**Alpha Psi Omega**		Collegiate	University of Pittsburgh	Pittsburgh, Pennsylvania	Active	
**Alpha Omega Rho**		Collegiate	Webber International University	Babson Park, Florida	Active	
**Beta Kappa Rho**		Collegiate	Ferris State University	Big Rapids, Michigan	Active	
**Beta Phi Zeta**		Collegiate	St. Edward's University	Austin, Texas	Active	
**Beta Sigma Omega Lambda**		Collegiate	Inver Hills Community College	Inver Grove Heights, Minnesota	Active	
**Gamma Alpha Epsilon**		Collegiate	Collin College	McKinney, Texas	Active	
**Gamma Epsilon Delta**		Collegiate	University of Central Missouri	Warrensburg, Missouri	Active	
**Gamma Theta Epsilon**		Collegiate	Franciscan University of Steubenville	Steubenville, Ohio	Active	
**Delta Zeta Omega**		Collegiate	University of Central Florida	Orlando, Florida	Active	
**Delta Sigma Upsilon**		Collegiate	Dalton State College	Dalton, Georgia	Active	
**Delta Sigma Chi**		Collegiate	Dyersburg State Community College	Covington, Tennessee	Active	
**Delta Tau Omega**		Collegiate	Fort Hays State University	Hays, Kansas	Active	
**Delta Chi Alpha**		Alumni		Montgomery, Texas	Active	
**Delta Kappa Epsilon**		Collegiate	Northern Oklahoma College	Tonkawa, Oklahoma	Active	
**Epsilon Chi Chi**		Collegiate	El Paso Community College	El Paso, Texas	Active	
**Epsilon Chi Upsilon**		Collegiate	East Central University	Ada, Oklahoma	Active	
**Zeta Epsilon Nu**		Collegiate	University of Tennessee at Martin	Martin, Tennessee	Active	
**Theta Lambda Chi**		Professional		Buena Park, California	Active	
**Iota Kappa Chi**		Collegiate	University of Texas Rio Grande Valley	Brownsville, Texas	Active	
**Kappa Xi Sigma**		Collegiate	Ocean County College	Toms River, New Jersey	Active	
**Kappa Omicron Rho**		Collegiate	Peru State College	Peru, Nebraska	Active	
**Kappa Omega Psi**		Collegiate	Colorado Technical University	Aurora, Colorado	Active	
**Lambda Kappa Alpha**		Collegiate	Longwood University	Farmville, Virginia	Active	
**Lambda Mu Upsilon**		Collegiate	James Madison University	Harrisonburg, Virginia	Active	
**Nu Alpha Chi**		Collegiate	Northeast Alabama Community College	Rainsville, Alabama	Active	
**Nu Sigma Alpha**		Collegiate	University of North Carolina at Charlotte	Charlotte, North Carolina	Active	
**Pi Lambda Alpha**		Collegiate	Central Methodist University	Fayette, Missouri	Active	
**Sigma Gamma Phi**		Collegiate	Northwestern State University	Natchitoches, Louisiana	Active	
**Sigma Delta Omega**		Collegiate	Arizona Western College	Yuma, Arizona	Active	
**Sigma Iota Gamma**		Professional		Strongsville, Ohio	Active	
**Sigma Kappa Chi**		Collegiate	University of Texas Rio Grande Valley	Edinburg, Texas	Active	
**Sigma Tau Omicron**		Collegiate	West Chester University	West Chester, Pennsylvania	Active	
**Sigma Chi Alpha**		Collegiate	Barton College	Wilson, North Carolina	Active	
**Sigma Chi Nu**		Collegiate	Northern Virginia Community College	Manassas, Virginia	Active	
**Tau Alpha Omicron**		Collegiate	Trine University	Angola, Indiana	Active	
**Tau Epsilon Lambda**		Collegiate	Garden City Community College	Garden City, Kansas	Active	
**Phi Omega Alpha**		Collegiate	California State University, Fresno	Fresno, California	Active	
**Phi Alpha Sigma**		Collegiate	Western Illinois University	Macomb, Illinois	Active	
**Phi Kappa Sigma**		Collegiate	Talladega College	Taladega, Alabama	Active	
**Chi Sigma Upsilon**		Collegiate	Columbia Southern University	Online	Active	
**Psi Sigma Iota**		Collegiate	Kent State University	Kent, Ohio	Active	
**Omega Sigma Alpha**		Collegiate	University of Scranton	Scranton, Pennsylvania	Active	
Omega Omega Omega	1963	Collegiate	Rio Honda College	Whittier, California	Inactive	
**Alpha Omega Delta Zeta**		Collegiate	Keiser University	Orlando, Florida	Active	
**Gamma Epsilon Zeta Rho**		Professional		Newark, Delaware	Active	
**Lambda Epsilon Omega Sigma**		Collegiate	Paradise Valley Community College	Phoenix, Arizona	Active	
**Nu Omega Lambda Omicron**		Collegiate	College of the Muscogee Nation	Okmulgee, Oklahoma	Active	
**Chi Omega Pi Sigma**		Professional		Boothwyn, Pennsylvania	Active	

== See also ==
- Professional fraternities and sororities
