= Joseph Osuigwe Chidiebere =

Nigerian advocate (born 1985)

Joseph Chidiebere Osuigwe
- Born: 26 June 1985 (age 41); Aba South, Abia State, Nigeria
- Education: University of Nigeria Nsukka
- Occupations: Nigerian human trafficking expert; Educator; Social entrepreneur
- Known for: Anti-human trafficking advocacy, educational supports to vulnerable children, and volunteerism
- Notable work: The Academy for Prevention of Human Trafficking and Other Related Matters(TAPHOM), Board of Volunteers against human trafficking, Project Donate2School, and Maximizing Your Brain Power.; Founder and Executive Director, Devatop Centre for Africa Development
- Website: www.devatop.org

Joseph Chidiebere Osuigwe // (born 26 June 1985) is a Nigerian human trafficking expert, educator, and social entrepreneur. He is the executive director of Devatop Centre for Africa Development, a nonprofit organization with focus on combating human trafficking, gender-based violence, providing educational supports to vulnerable children and empowering women and youth.

== Early life and family ==
Joseph Osuigwe was born in Aba, Abia on 26 June 1985. He is the first son of the family of two boys. He hails from Umuzeala Ogwara, Ehime Mbano in Imo State, Nigeria.

== Educational background ==
Osuigwe attended primary school in Aba South and secondary school in Ehime Mbano area, before obtaining bachelor of education in mathematics from University of Nigeria, Nsukka in 2011. While at the university, he was the general course leader of mathematics, computer science, physics, and chemistry departments from 2008 to 2011.

== National Youth Service ==
During his National Youth Service in 2013 at women rehabilitation centre operated by Society Against Prostitution and Child Labour (SAP-CLN) in Abuja, he published and donated his book titled: Maximizing Your Brain Power...a pathway to becoming an intellectual giant” to more than 90 schools in 85 communities. After interacting with survivors of sex trafficking at the women rehabilitation centre, he initiated a community project through which he trained 1900 young people to work towards eradicating human trafficking in Abuja. He received an award by National Youth Service Corps for his community projects on education and anti-human trafficking.

He has also received support from U.S Embassy Nigeria to train NYSC members and engaged them to carryout out anti-human trafficking community projects

== Work ==
Joseph founded Devatop Centre for Africa Development while doing his National Youth Service Corps, and in 2016 the organization was incorporated. He also initiated The Academy for Prevention of Human Trafficking and Other Related Matters (TAPHOM). He is the convener of TALKAM Human Rights Reporting App and host of TALKAM Human Rights Radio Program.

Joseph has presented research papers at International Human Trafficking and Social Justice Conference, USA.

== Awards and honours ==
- National Unity Merit Award
- Hero of Humanity
- Pollination Project Award
- Humanitarian Award 2017

== Books authored by Joseph Osuigwe Chidiebere ==
- Maximizing Your Brain Power...a pathway to becoming an intellectual giant
- End Female Genital Mutilation Advocacy Booklet
- Becoming An Anti-Human Trafficking Advocate

== International Visitors Leadership Program(IVLP) ==
Joseph Osuigwe participated in a U.S Exchange program, known as International Visitor Leadership Program (IVLP) in Washington DC and Austin, during which he explored the best practices, innovative approaches, and policies in tackling human trafficking in United States.
