= Criminal Justice System in Nigeria =

Nigeria’s criminal justice system is influenced by a mix of pre colonial and colonial traditions. There are three major systems that work independently of each other but often overlap; Customary Law, Sharia Law, and Common Law.

== Customary law ==
Before the British colonial era, ethnic groups like the Yoruba, Igbo, and the Hausa, had their own systems for resolving conflicts. Rather than focusing on jail as a punishment, traditional customary systems focused more on reconciliation and restoring peace, and communities holding each other responsible for their actions. Disputes were settled by elders, and punishments included compensation or social shame rather than incarceration. It is still used today to solve local issues in many areas, however it is mainly used for civil cases and is used rarely for minor criminal offenses.

== Sharia law ==
Sharia Law is based on Islamic beliefs and the Qur'an and is central in twelve northern areas on Nigeria. Sharia Courts handle both civil and criminal matters. The Sharia Penal and Criminal Procedure Codes run parallel to the Penal and Criminal Procedure Codes of 1960, both of which are implemented in the northern states of Nigeria. The 1960 Codes are applied in the Magistrate’s Courts and High Courts while Sharia Codes are applied in the Sharia Courts. The Sharia Codes do incorporate components from the 1960 codes but they also add in elements from the Maliki School of Islamic criminal law. The Sharia Penal Codes are organized into three chapters, Hudud and Hudud-Related Offences, Qisas and Qisas-Related Offences, and Ta’azir Offences. They impose punishments such as amputation and stoning in addition to more traditional punishments such as incarceration and fines found in the 1960 Codes. The Sharia Codes give judges more freedom with their sentencing.

== Common law ==
The British introduced English law during the colonial era. It eventually became the foundation of the modern formal criminal justice system, evolving into Common Law during Nigeria's independence in 1960. It consists of three elements; law enforcement, courts, and correctional services.

== Law enforcement ==
The Nigeria Police Force was created in 1930. It is responsible for preventing crime, protecting citizens, maintaining public order, and enforcing laws. The Nigeria Police Force faces a number of issues including lack of training, low funding, and corruption. Bribery and extortion are rampant through the department. This is a publicly known issue so it has caused distrust from citizens, which is why many areas still rely on customary laws as they don't believe that the NPF will fairly carry out justice.

== Court system ==
Nigeria’s court system is an hierarchical system. The lowest is the Magistrate Court. They handle minor offenses and preliminary hearings before moving on to higher levels. Also on the bottom of the system are Area Courts. These mirror the use of the Magistrate Court but are used in the North where Sharia Law is applied. Next on the hierarchical system is the State High Court. This court handles serious matters such as murder and fraud. On the same level is the Federal High Court. They see major cases such as immigration, drug cases and cases that involve federal agencies. The Court of Appeal is the next level. It reviews decisions from the lower courts. At the top of the hierarchy is the Supreme Court of Nigeria which is the ultimate court of appeals. In parallel, there are also Sharia Courts of Appeal and Customary Courts of Appeal that handle appeals related to their own legal traditions.

== Criminal justice process ==
A criminal case in Nigeria begins when someone reports a crime to the police. After that, the police starts the process by investigating and arresting, and bringing suspects before a court. Depending on the circumstances, arrests can be made with or without a warrant. Suspects do have rights such as rights to representation and reasonable time for appearing before the court, defined in the Constitution. However, these rights are not often respected. One of the most serious concerns regarding Nigeria’s justice system is prolonged pretrial detention. Many people are held in jail for years due to lack of legal representation, and lack of coordination between the police and prosecutors. The number of people awaiting trial is higher than the number of convicted inmates. Prosecution is usually carried out by Ministries of Justice, the Attorney General of the Federation, or police prosecutors. Trials follow procedures seen in British law. Both sides present their evidence, call witnesses, and then cross examine the evidence and witnesses. Trials often drag on longer than they should due to overbearing court dockets, limited number of judges, or incomplete investigations. This results in cases remaining unresolved for long periods of time, also contributing to the lack of trust in the criminal justice system.

== Correctional services ==
Nigerian courts offer a range of penalties following conviction including fines, restitution, community service, or probation. Even though these alternatives to prison exist, judges mainly only use prison sentences, which is fueling the overcrowding problem. Many prisons house far more people than they were designed for. Correctional facilities struggle with poor infrastructure, healthcare, and sanitation. A major issue is the large number of people in pretrial detention because of prolonged hearings. Some spend more time waiting for trial than the maximum sentence for the offense that they were accused of in the first place.

== Reform ==
=== ACJA 2015 ===
The Administration of Criminal Justice Act of 2015 was introduced by the National Working Group, led by Chinoye Obiagwu, Yemi Akinseye-George, and Adedeji Adekunle. Its intention was to quicken criminal procedures, decrease delays, ensure suspects’ rights, and emphasize alternatives to imprisonment. It introduced measures like mandatory recording of confessions, and wider use of alternative punishments. Since its passing in 2015, all 36 states have introduced an equivalent state level bill into law. The work of the ACJA is evident with delays going from an average of 44 months in 2012 to 22 months in 2022. The ACJA also helped the push for over 200 corruption cases to be prosecuted, resulting in over a 50% conviction rate.

=== The Correctional Service Act of 2019 ===
The Correctional Service Act of 2019 replaced the Prisons Act of 2004. The act divided the sector into two; Custodial and Non-Custodial Services. This was the first time that the power and functions of the two different sectors were explicitly outlined. Part I of the Act covered the responsibilities of the Custodial Sector, most notably ensuring healthcare, including mental health, to prisoners and the sanitation of facilities. It also required that education and reentry programs be offered prior to release. It also requires a higher level of training for Correctional Officers, better ensuring the safety and human rights of inmates, and a higher degree of punishment for officers that do not comply. Part II covered the Non Custodial sector. This includes alternative punishments such as community service, probation and other restorative measures. It establishes a non custodial fund that encourages judges to use these tools instead of incarceration.
