= Devatop Centre for Africa Development =

Nigerian nonprofit organization

- Founded: Started as a community development project in 2013 by Joseph Osuigwe Chidiebere in Nigeria
- Type: Non-profit; NGO
- Headquarters: Abuja, Nigeria
- Location: Nigeria
- Services: Equipping and empowering young people to be at the forefront of combating human trafficking, and national development.
- Fields: Anti-human trafficking, human rights, education, eradicating gender-based violence, preventing female genital mutilation, women empowerment, and youth empowerment
- Founder: Joseph Osuigwe Chidiebere
- Website: devatop.org

Devatop Centre for Africa Development is a youth-led nonprofit organization with aimed towards fighting and combating human trafficking, gender-based violence, child abuse, providing educational materials and academical support to vulnerable children, and empowering women and youth. The organization has been in the forefront of combating human trafficking and executing educational projects in Nigeria. It is registered with the Cooperate Affairs Commission Nigeria and since its establishment it has impacted over a million people through training, sensitization, assistance, donations and media.

== History ==
The Devatop Centre for Africa Development started in 2013 as a National Youth Service Community Development Project by Joseph Osuigwe Chidiebere. After Osuigwe interviewed and interacted with victims of sex trafficking, he was aggrieved at the rate of human trafficking in Nigeria, and this propelled him to initiate a community service to train thousands of youth, teenagers, educators, and women on how to combat human trafficking. He partnered with United Nations Office on Drugs and Crime (UNODC) and National Agency for Prohibition of Trafficking in Persons (NAPTIP) to execute different anti-human trafficking projects. In 2014, he formed a team of young people to sustain the impact, and this led to the establishment of the Devatop Centre for Africa Development.

== Vision and missions ==
The vision of Devatop is to build a nation without human trafficking and where young people are empowered for national development. Her missions are: To combat and prevent human trafficking, gender-based violence, & violence against children. To provide educational support to vulnerable children. To empower women and young people to be agents of national development and to play strategic roles in combating human trafficking.

== Impact and controversy ==
Through her training, advocacy, and TV and radio programmes, more than one million people have been sensitized on anti-human trafficking and eradication of gender based violence. Devatop is mainly working with young people in prevention of human trafficking. Some people have frowned at how Devatop is using young people to combat human trafficking. The organization’s idea is that since young people are the major targets of traffickers, then they need to be trained and empowered to be at the forefront of combating the monstrous crime. The organization has provided educational materials and services to internally displaced children. At least 90 schools in 85 communities have benefited from her educational donations and seminars.

== Partnership ==
The organization has partnered with:

- National Agency for Prohibition of Trafficking in Persons (NAPTIP), National Human Rights Commission (NHRC) and United Nations Office on Drugs and Crime (UNODC) to carry out anti-human trafficking advocacy projects in Nigeria.
- United Nations Children Education Fund (UNICEF) to provide educational materials and services to internally displaced children.

== Supporters ==
- The Pollination Project
- The Girl Generation
- Mcginnity Family Foundation
- U.S Embassy Abuja
- Africa Centre for Media and Information Literacy
- International Centre for Investigative Reporting
- Human Rights Radio 101.1FM Abuja

== Programs ==
- Red card to FGM
- World Book day
- Project Donate2School
- HumansNot4Trade Campaign
- Anti-Human Trafficking Advocacy
- End Human Trafficking and Irregular Migration Advocacy

== The Academy for Prevention of Human Trafficking and Other Related Matters ==
In 2015, the organization started a pilot project on The Academy for Prevention of Human Trafficking and Other Related Matters. The initiator, Mr. Osuigwe said, "The academy focuses on Training, Advocacy, Research, Media, Publication and Empowerment. In the first phase of the pilot project, 120 young people from 6 states in Nigeria were trained, after which they impacted the lives of 6000 people within 9 months. They also reported incidences of human trafficking. One of the reported cases was Amina who was abducted/trafficked from Abuja to Kano for forced marriage." She was eventually rescued.

== TALKAM ==
On 25 October 2018, Devatop Centre for Africa Development launched the TALKAM mobile application for reporting human trafficking and gender-based violence(GBV); and also a human trafficking data portal which will help to gather information of different forms of human trafficking incidences and governments efforts to tackling them in each of the 36 states of Nigeria. TALKAM is an innovative project that focuses on utilizing information and communication technology tools to speak out about human trafficking, human rights abuses & irregular migration. It monitors, analyzes, reports, advocates and stimulates actions among community members, policy makers, government, and more importantly to change the status quo in Nigeria.

The organization started a weekly TALKAM radio and TV program against human trafficking and migration on Human Rights Radio 101.1FM Abuja. The program, which airs every Friday from 10am to 10.30am, engages experts to sensitize citizens about new trends of human trafficking and migration, while allowing them to phone-in to commend or report during the show.

== Devatop anti-human trafficking ambassadors ==
- Chido Onumah (author and activist)
- Rachel Bakam (TV presenter and actress)
- John Fashanu (footballer)
- Kenneth Okonkwo (Nollywood actor)
- Esther Ekanem (anti-sex trafficking activist)

== End female genital mutilation advocacy ==
To protect the rights of women and girls, Devatop Centre for Africa Development, through her Executive Director, Joseph Osuigwe initiated End FGM Advocacy, making the organization among the leading youth-driven anti-female genital mutilation organizations in Nigeria. Devatop has gotten grants from The Girl Generation and The Pollination Project to train over 210 advocates in Imo State and Abuja. The trained advocates are taking actions to reach out to 15,000 community members.
