= Network Against Child Trafficking, Abuse and Labour =

Nigerian umbrella network against human trafficking

Agency overview
- Formed: 2003
- Headquarters: Abuja, FCT, Nigeria
- Motto: For the protection of vulnerable persons in the Nigerian society
- Agency executives: Abdulganiyu Abubakar, National President; Nosakhare Erhunmwunsee, National Public Relations Officer; Lilian Ezenwa, Vice President; Kaneng Rwang Pam, National Treasurer; Ositadinma Osemene, National Secretary; Modupe Omobolanle Adelanwa, Assistant National Secretary;; Kola Giwa, National Internal Auditor; Oge Ewelem, National Legal Adviser; Jennifer Ero, National Financial Secretary;
- Website: nactal.org

Network Against Trafficking, Abuse and Labour (NACTAL) is an umbrella organisation of Nigerian non-governmental organizations engaged in advocacy and campaign for children's rights, anti-human trafficking, human rights abuse and child labour with some 220 member organizations in the six geopolitical zones of Nigeria and the Federal Capital Territory.

== History ==
NACTAL was founded in 2003 by the United Nations Children's Fund (formerly, United Nations International Children's Emergency Fund), and registered by the Corporate Affairs Commission (CAC) in 2005. NACTAL partners with embassies, government agencies e.g. National Agency for the Prohibition of Trafficking in Persons (NAPTIP), Nigeria Police Force (NPF), Nigeria Immigration Service (NIS), Expertise France, European Union, International Organization for Migration (IOM), and A-TIPSOM/FIIAPP Nigeria Police.

== Mission and activities ==
The organization engages in activities including rescue of victims of human trafficking, anti-human trafficking campaigns, training, and implementation of programmes using the 5 P's to stop human trafficking which are as follows: prevention, protection, partnership, prosecution and policy.

== Governance ==
NACTAL is led by a board of trustees, National Executive Council (NEC) and six zonal coordinators. The board of trustee is chaired by Bolaji Owasanoye, national executive council is headed by Ustaz Amin O. Igwegbe and the national president is Abdulganiyu Abubakar.

== Membership ==
NACTAL has over 220 non-governmental organizations (NGOs), faith based organizations (FBOs) and community based organizations (CBOs) as members working in the area of anti-human trafficking, child protection, abuse/labour, irregular migration and smuggling of migrants in the six geo-political zones of Nigeria and the Federal Capital Territory (FCT).
