= History of the state of São Paulo =

Flag of São Paulo

Coat of arms of São Paulo with "PRO BRASILIA FIANT EXIMIA"

São Paulo is one of 26 states of the Federative Republic of Brazil. It has been inhabited since 12000 BC, when the first indigenous people came to the area. Portuguese and Spanish navigators arrived in the 15th century. In 1532, Portuguese explorer Martim Afonso de Sousa officially founded the first Portuguese settlement in the Americas, the village of São Vicente.

In the 17th century, the bandeirantes accelerated exploration of the interior, expanding Portugal's territories in South America beyond the agreed borders set by the Treaty of Tordesilhas.

After the Captaincy of São Paulo was established in the 18th century, the region increased in political importance, although it achieved more significant economic and population growth after the independence of Brazil.

Under the Empire of Brazil, São Paulo's economy was based on coffee plantations. In the second half of the 19th century, European immigrants increasingly replaced slave labor on plantations, mainly Italians attracted by the imperial government's offer of land. Increased coffee cultivation and the construction of railroads drove the growth of the state's economy. In the 20th century, especially in the Vargas Era, state economic development primarily centered on the industrial sector, which fueled production for all of Brazil.

São Paulo's population greatly increased in the modern era. It has one of the country's most urbanized populations, and today is one of the most diverse in the country, mainly descended from Italians, Portuguese, indigenous peoples, Afro-Brazilians, and migrants from other regions of the country. Other populations such as Arabs, Germans, Spaniards, Japanese and Chinese also have a significant presence in the state.

== Indigenous peoples ==
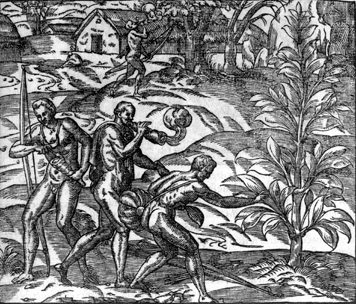
17th-century engraving by André Thevet, depicting Tupinambá men smoking

Indigenous peoples have lived in São Paulo since approximately 12000 BC. Around 1000, its coast was invaded by Tupi speakers from the Amazon rainforest. When Europeans arrived in the 16th century, the indigenous people on the coast were mostly Tupinambás, Tupiniquins and Carijós, with Macro-Jê speakers in the interior.

== European colonization ==
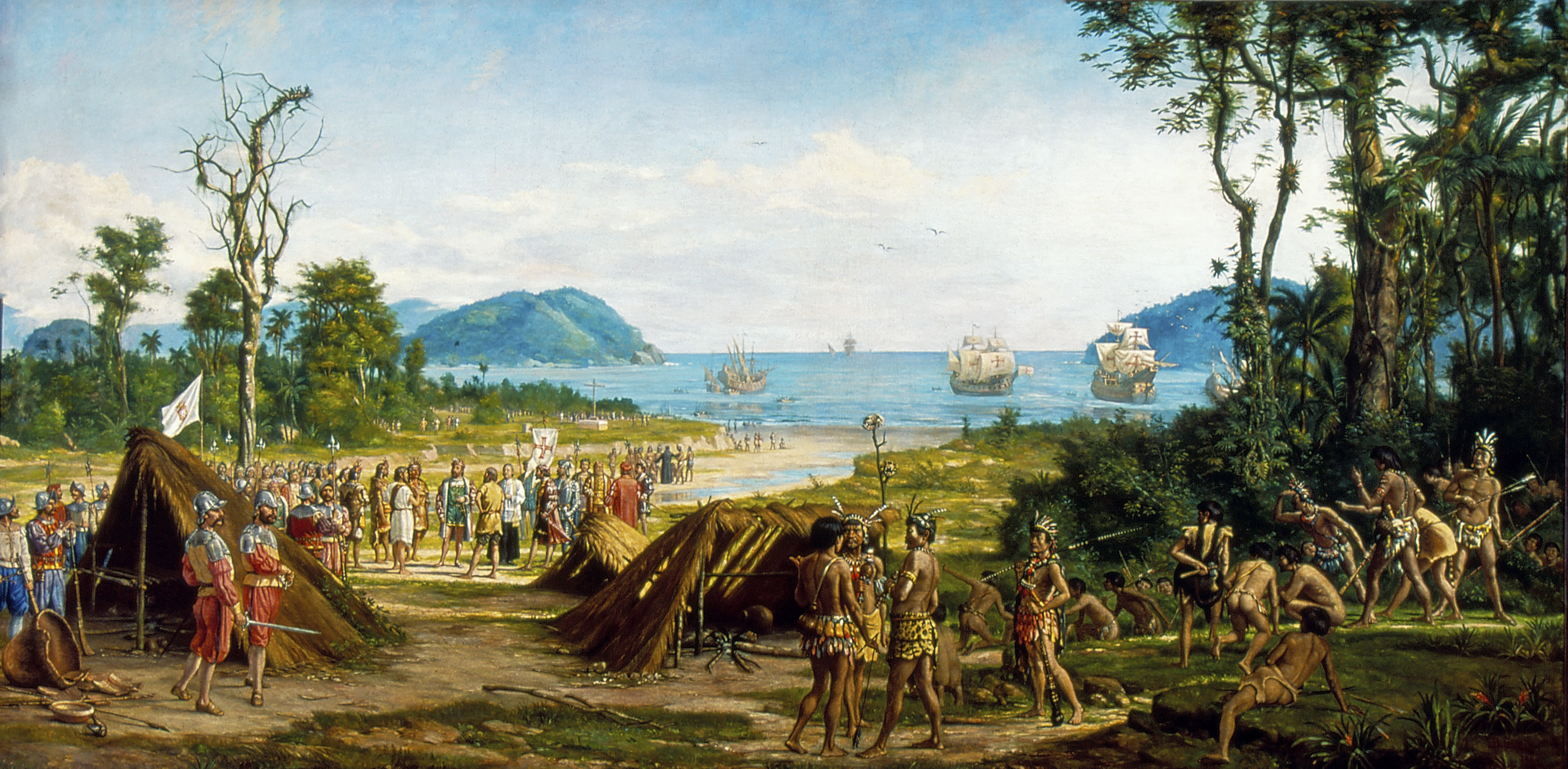
"Founding of São Vicente", by Benedito Calixto

The first European settlements in São Paulo were unofficial. Cosme Fernandes Pessoa, a Portuguese exile and castaway known as "the Bachelor of Cananéia", is considered the original founder of the São Vicente settlement by many historians. Pessoa governed São Vicente and controlled the region's trade. A document dated April 23, 1499, found by historian Jaime Cortesão suggests that Pessoa lived in Brazil before Pedro Álvares Cabral arrived in 1500: the document reports an unofficial trip by Bartolomeu Dias to Brazil. Another document, from 1526, describes São Vicente as a village of a dozen houses, only one of them built of stone, and one tower for defense. This initial nucleus was probably begun by castaways.

On January 22, 1502, Amerigo Vespucci named São Vicente Island, the location of the settlement of the same name, after one of the patron saints of Portugal, Saint Vincent of Saragossa, while mapping the coast of Brazil.

In 1530, Martim Afonso de Sousa left Portugal for Brazil, assigned by King John III to establish a colony to confirm the power of Portugal's monarchy. De Sousa was instructed to remove Pessoa from power in São Vicente. Having warning of De Sousa's intentions, Pessoa had the settlement burned and its people fled to the settlement of Cananéia. On the ruins of the old city, de Sousa founded São Vicente officially on January 20, 1532, making it the first legal Portuguese settlement in Brazil. De Sousa distributed sesmaria land grants and constructed several buildings, leaving São Vicente populated and organized. São Vicente hosted the Americas' first parliament and held the continents' first elections. In 1536, a group led by Pessoa attacked, looted and burned São Vicente, where they hanged Henrique Montes, a former friend of Pessoa who had criticized him to the king to receive land. De Sousa was granted a hereditary captaincy, the Captaincy of São Vicente, in 1534.

When de Sousa sailed from Brazil on May 22, 1533, he left his wife Ana Pimentel the first grantee in Brazil. She in turn appointed Brás Cubas as governor of the captaincy.

The port of São Vicente suffered the first major ecological disaster in Brazil: land near the sea had been cleared and farmed. Since the soil was sandy and had lost its protective layer, rains took the sand out to sea, silting the port of São Vicente, the only access to the Portuguese mainland. Given the loss of the port and the attack by the Bachelor of Cananeia on São Vicente, Cubas decided to set up a more sheltered port in the Enguaguaçu region. The fact that the name of this place was indigenous, not Portuguese, shows that the initiative was not official. The port was transferred in 1536, and a settlement established there which was later called Santos. Cubas attracted settlers there from the surrounding area and built the first Catholic mission in Brazil, Santa Casa (Holy House). The village of São Vicente went into decline.

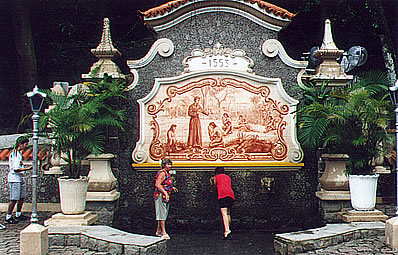
"Biquinha de Anchieta", catechism classes of Jesuit José de Anchieta

Despite the difficulties of crossing the Serra do Mar, the fields of the plateau attracted settlers and made São Paulo an exception in early Portuguese colonization, which usually concentrated on the coasts. Looking for precious metals, the Portuguese crossed the Serra do Mar by an old indigenous route through Peabiru. In 1553, Portuguese settlers founded the Vila de Santo André da Borda do Campo.

The Jesuits, led by Manuel da Nóbrega in 1554 founded a college for Indians on a hill in Piratininga, which became the village of São Paulo de Piratininga, on the plateau beyond. The Portuguese also founded other villages on the plateau such as Santana de Parnaíba, thus guaranteeing the security and livelihood of São Paulo.

By 1560, Vila de Santo André was extinct and its residents moved to São Paulo de Piratininga. The coastal strip, narrow due to the barrier of the Serra do Mar, lacked the necessary conditions for large-scale farming. In turn, the plateau faced the serious obstacle of the Caminho do Mar, which, instead of connecting, isolated the Piratininga region, denying it access to the ocean and, therefore, transportation. As a result, the captaincy was prevented from successfully cultivating the main agricultural product of colonial Brazil, sugarcane, and from competing with the main sugar cultivation zones of the time, Pernambuco and Bahia.

Piratininga established a subsistence polyculture was based on the forced labor of indigenous people. The inventories of the first paulista settlers show few imports and a complete absence of luxury. Isolation created a peculiar society in the plateau. Arriving in São Paulo required particular strength to cross the mountains and withstand attacks by Indians, hunger, and disease. These living conditions determined the structure of their society in a more democratic way than in those established further north.

Although there were reports of Portuguese women in De Sousa's fleet, no records of this have yet been found. The first known written record of Portuguese women in Brazil dates from 1550. Thus, the first wives were generally mamelucas (mestizo) or Indias (indigenous). The proliferation of mamelucos, resulting from marriages to the indigenous Tupi peoples that dominated the Brazilian coast, contributed to a cultural hybridism that attenuated less quickly than in other regions, where an influx of blacks and easier contact with the metropolis diluted it. More than anywhere else, the Portuguese in São Paulo integrated certain cultural traits of the Tupis that allowed them to survive — and more, to take advantage of — the hostile backlands.

== The "Bandeiras" ==
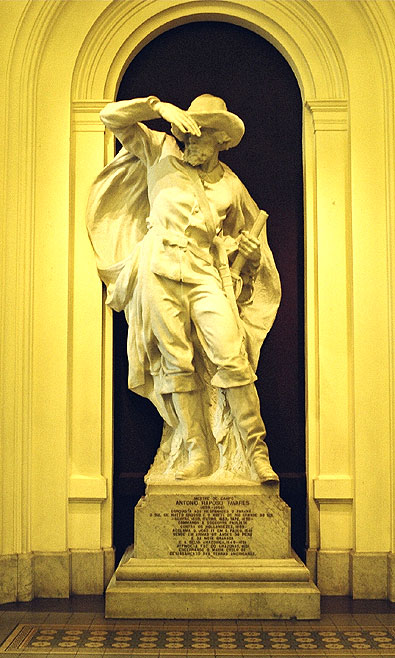
Statue of Antônio Raposo Tavares, one of the most famous bandeirantes, at the Museu Paulista in São Paulo

Economic difficulties and a spirit of adventure were important factors in the rush into the hinterland. This was the century of Bandeirantes, one in which the bandeirismo offensive began, largely motivated by the profits to be made hunting indigenous peoples for slaves. From the village of São Paulo, the bandeirantes headed by Antônio Raposo Tavares, Manuel Preto, and André Fernandes, among others, departed.

Due to their isolation, the paulistas, as the residents of São Paulo are known, enjoyed considerable autonomy for the first two centuries in areas such as defense, indigenous relations, ecclesiastical administration, public works and municipal services, price controls and goods. The local governments, composed of "good men" of the land, were rarely limited to their legitimate attributions. São Paulo's independence especially almost made the Portuguese government forget it.

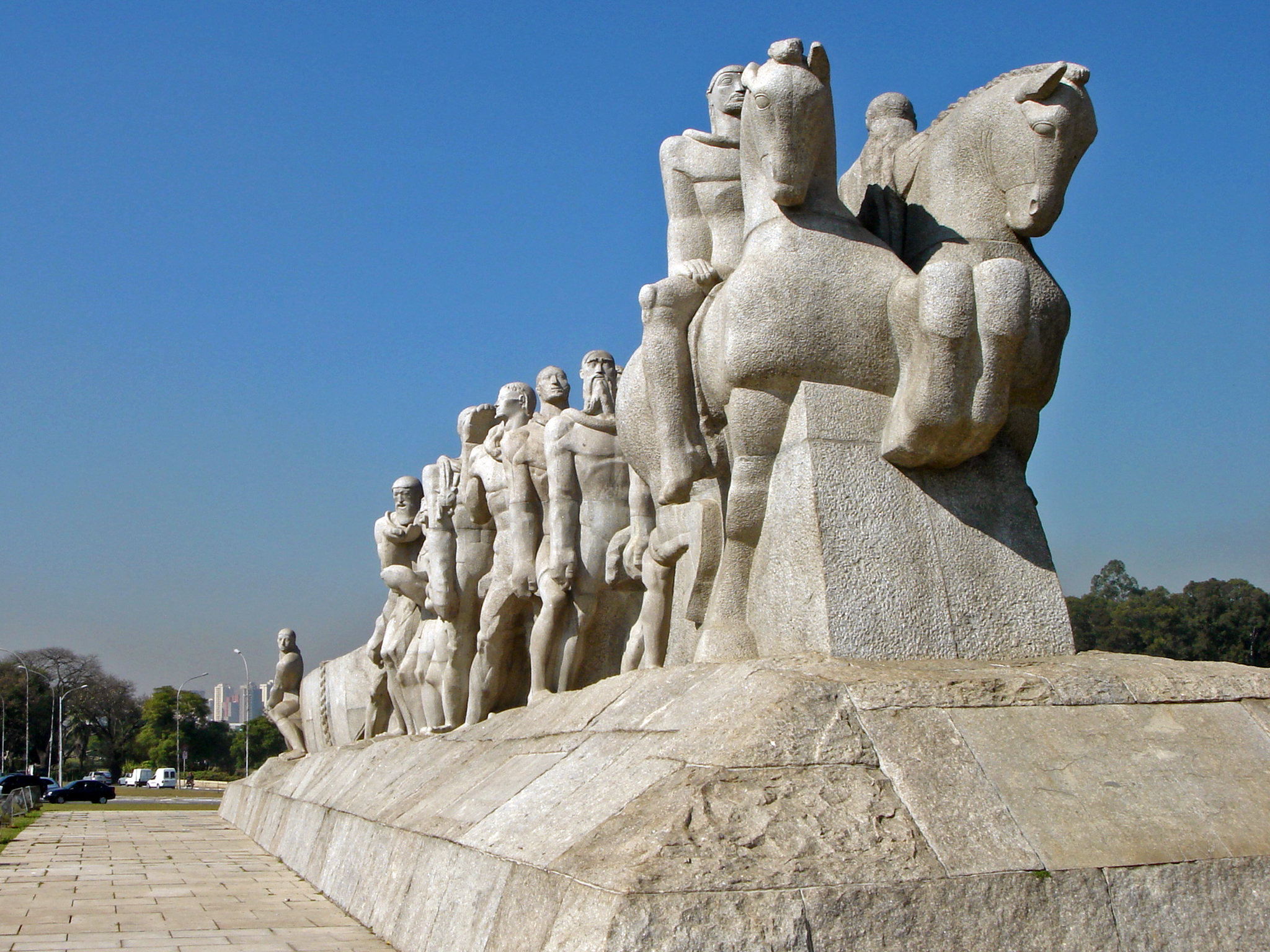
Monument to the Bandeiras, in Ibirapuera Park in São Paulo.

The slaver bandeirismo, became the mining bandeirismo when Borba Gato, Bartolomeu Bueno da Silva, Pascoal Moreira Cabral Leme and others discovered gold veins in Minas Gerais and Mato Grosso. A hard ordeal was the effect of the discovery of gold on São Paulo and other villages on the plateau: all sought the immediate enrichment represented by the precious metal. As José Joaquim Machado de Oliveira said, "there were no Paulista who, more or less, stopped stroking the thought of discovering mines".

Thus, the population of the Brazilian backlands was made at the sacrifice of the inhabitants of São Paulo and at the expense of the population density of the captaincy. This demographic rupture, combined with the geographical factors already mentioned (the Serra do Mar), caused a fall in agricultural productivity, as well as a decline in other activities, which accentuated the people's poverty during the 18th century. The captaincy, which then covered the entire region of the gold discoveries, was transferred to the crown and got its own government in 1709, separate from the government of Rio de Janeiro, and with headquarters in town of São Paulo, elevated to city in 1711.

== Gold rush and decline ==
At the end of the 17th century, bandeirantes from São Paulo discovered gold in the region of Rio das Mortes, close to the current São João del-Rei. The discovery of immense gold deposits provoked a race to Minas Gerais, as the numerous gold deposits were called at the time.

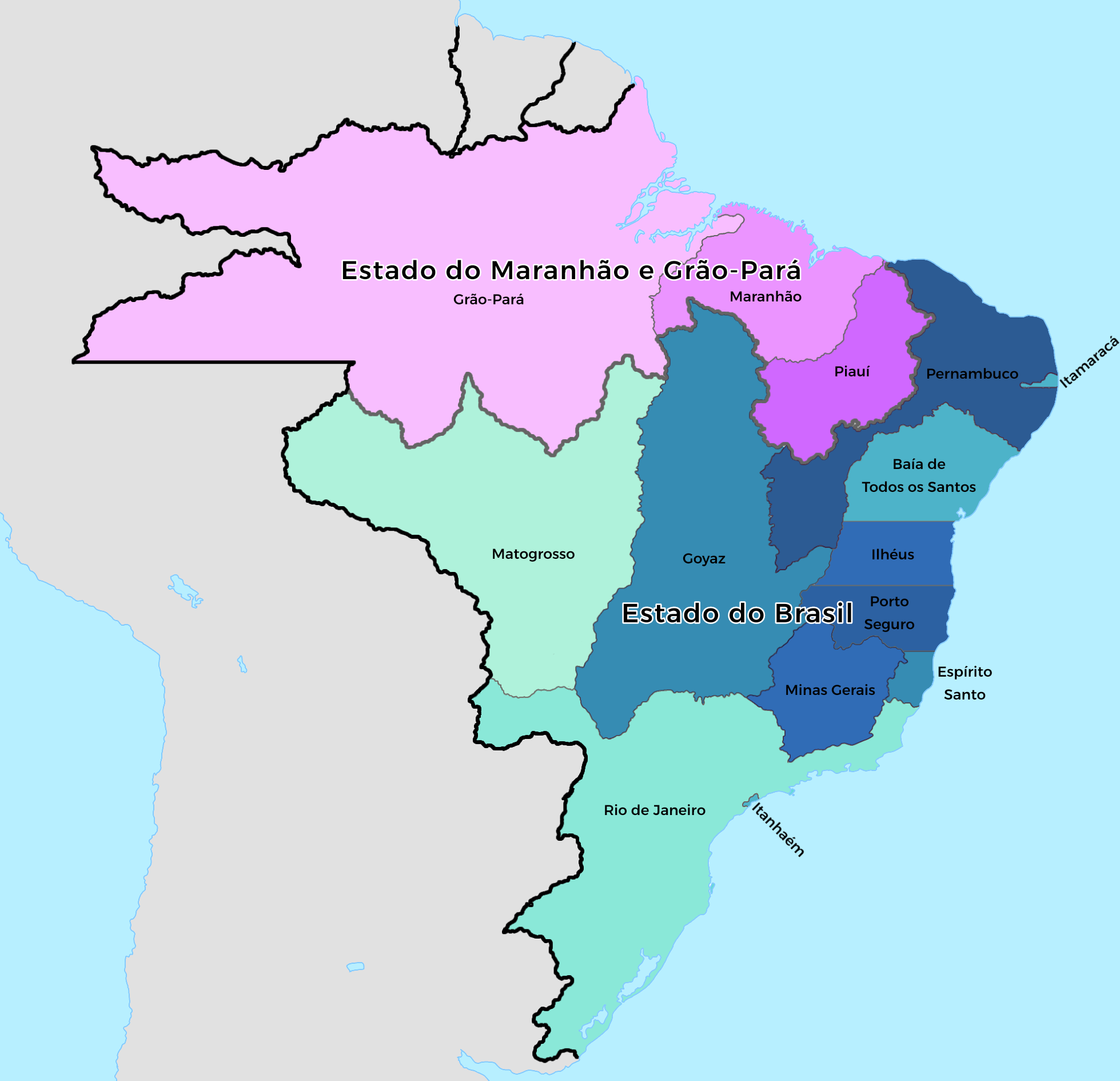
Administrative division of Brazil after War of the Emboabas

As discoverers of the mines, the paulistas wanted exclusive rights to prospect for gold. They were defeated in 1710 with the end of the War of the Emboabas (War of the Newcomers) however, and lost control of Minas Gerais, which became an autonomous captaincy in 1721. The gold extracted from Minas Gerais was exported through Rio de Janeiro. As compensation, São Paulo was elevated to the status of city in 1711.

The exodus towards Minas Gerais caused the economic decline in the captaincy, and throughout the 18th century it lost territory and economic dynamism until it was simply annexed in 1748 to the captaincy of Rio de Janeiro. Thus, shortly before being annexed to Rio de Janeiro, São Paulo lost territory for the creation of Capitania de Goiás and Capitania do Mato Grosso. These two captaincies today correspond to the states of Mato Grosso do Sul, Mato Grosso, Rondônia, Goiás, Tocantins, Federal District and the Triângulo Mineiro.

Some authors have contested this version of the captaincy's decay. The main argument that leads historians to defend this thesis is the stabilization of the number of villages that arose in the period. However, the number of inhabitants would not have decreased, only concentrated in the existing villages, and its population, despite not directly profiting from the mines, dominated the supply of food, mainly linked to livestock. The main justification for the annexation to Grosso was the security of the mines, since São Paulo would be their natural shield against invasions from Argentina or other Spanish colonies.

== Return of the captaincy and Province of São Paulo ==
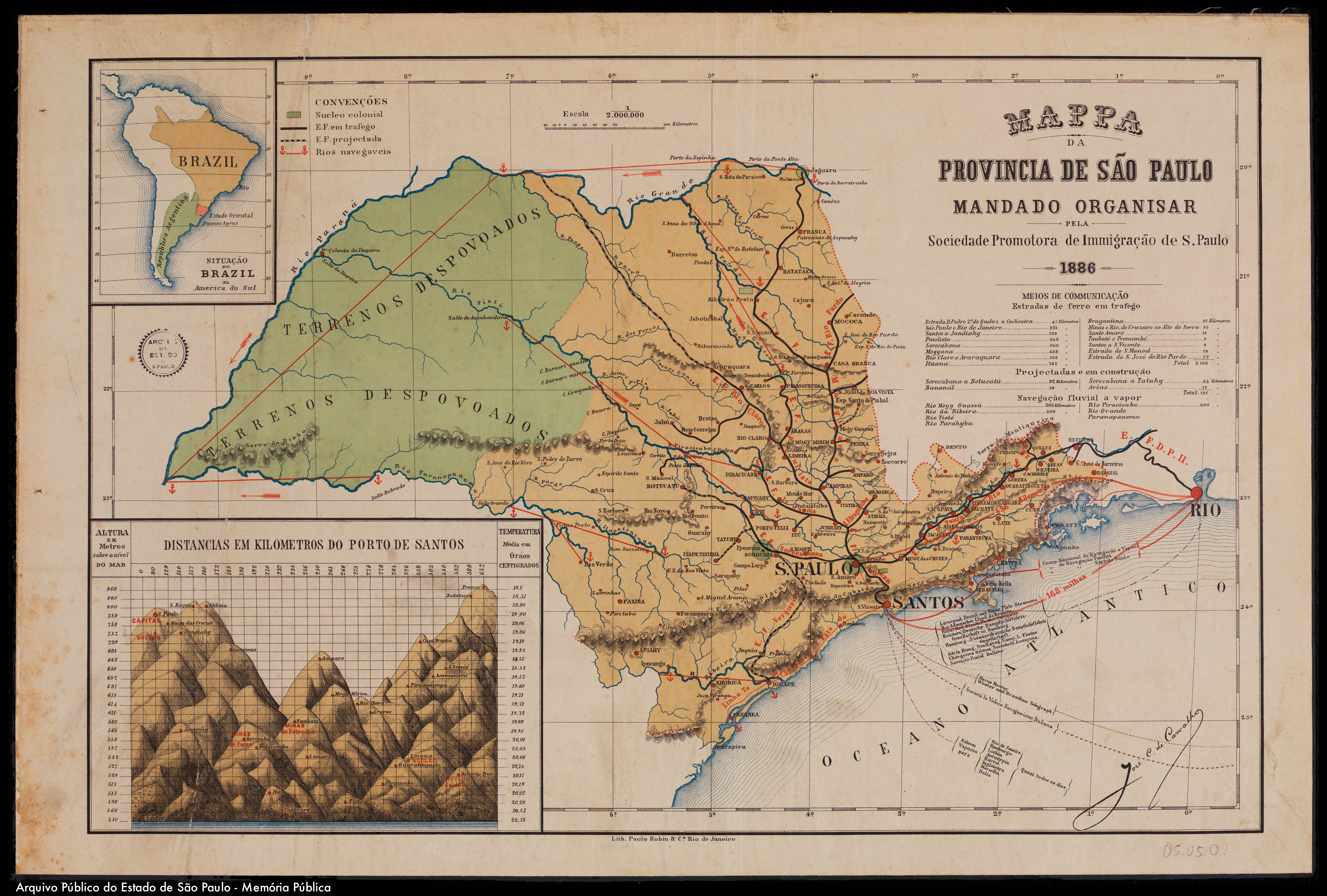
Map of the province of São Paulo (1886).

The governor of Minas Gerais, Luís Diogo Lobo da Silva, on September 24, 1764, annexed the left bank of the Sapucaí River, extending the borders of Minas Gerais to roughly the current border with São Paulo, which never recovered the annexed territory, even after the captaincy was re-created. The region annexed by Minas Gerais continued to belong to Archdiocese of São Paulo however.

In 1765, through the efforts of Luís Antônio de Sousa Botelho Mourão the Morgado de Mateus, São Paulo again became a captaincy. Sugar production was incentivized, to provide revenue. However, the captaincy retained only about a third of its original territory — the current states of São Paulo and Paraná, and part of Santa Catarina.

The Morgado de Mateus created the villages of Lages and Campo Mourão to defend the captaincy, as well as several other villages, which had not occurred since the beginning of the 18th century in São Paulo.

The villages of Campinas and Piracicaba were founded in eastern São Paulo, a favorable region for farming, where sugar cane grew quickly. Sugar was exported through the port of Santos, peaking at the beginning of the 19th century.

The captaincy of São Paulo gained political weight during the time of Independence of Brazil through José Bonifácio de Andrada. On September 7, 1822, Dom Pedro I proclaimed Brazilian independence on the banks of the Ipiranga Brook in São Paulo. In 1821 the captaincy became a province.

In 1820, John VI of Portugal annexed Lages to Santa Catarina, costing São Paulo a little more of its territory.

In 1853, the province of Paraná was created, and São Paulo lost territory for a final time, and has maintained its current territory from that date.

The current territorial boundaries of the state of São Paulo weren't definitively fixed until the 1930s.

== The Coffee in history of the State of São Paulo ==
In 1817 the first coffee farm in São Paulo was founded in the Paraíba do Sul River valley. After independence, coffee cultivation became more prevalent in the Paraíba, rapidly enriching cities such as Guaratinguetá, Bananal, Lorena and Pindamonhangaba.

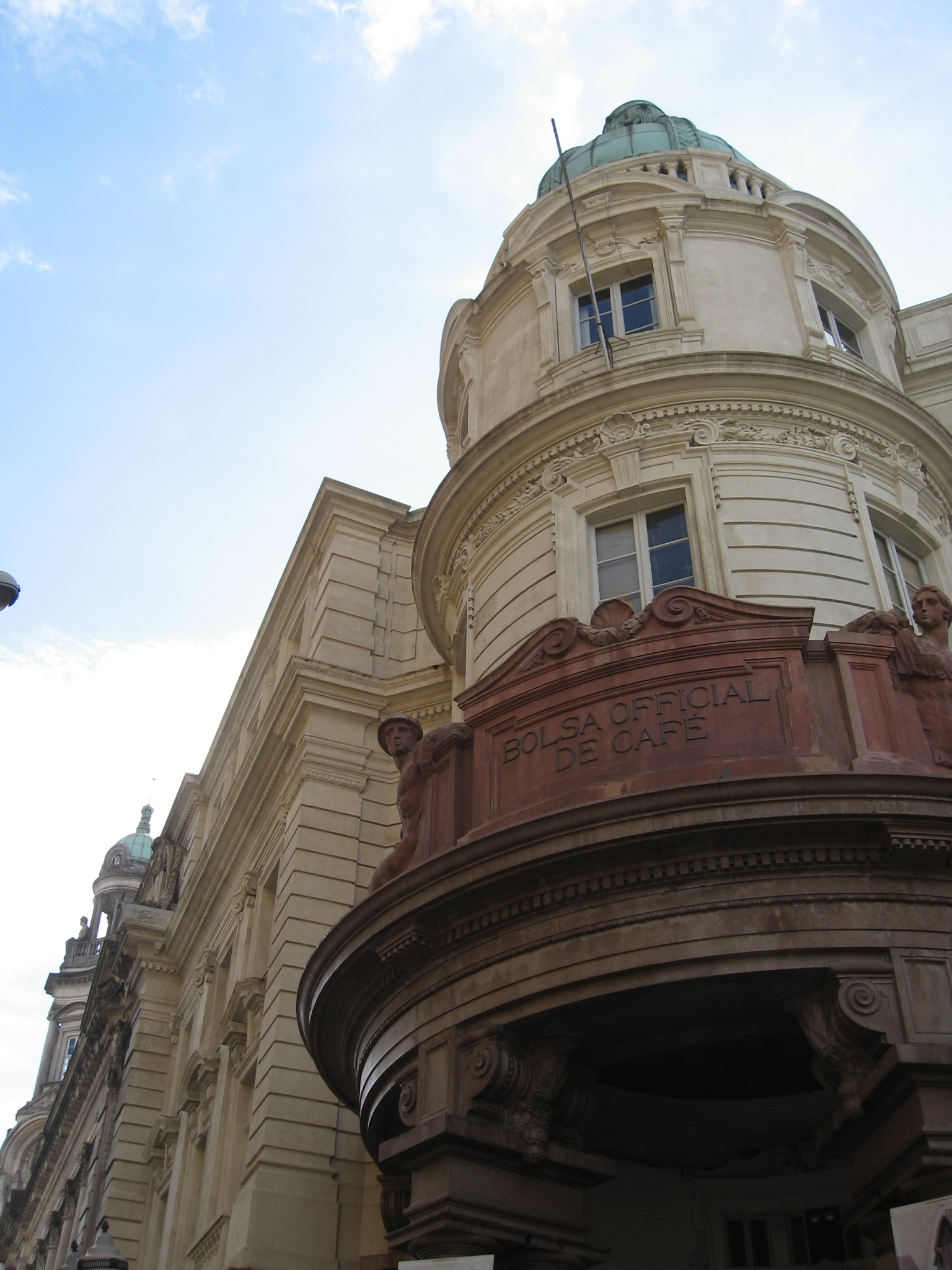
Bolsa do Café (Coffee exchange) in Santos, now a museum

The coffee plantations of the Paraíba Valley used slave labor on a large scale, and sold the beans through Rio de Janeiro. As a result, the valley quickly enriched itself, creating a rural oligarchy. However, the rest of the province remained dependent on sugar cane and on the commerce in the city of São Paulo, driven by the establishment of a law school in 1827. São Paulo also began grow as a city, opening its first establishments for travelers, students and merchants who wanted to learn about the area or to establish projects. Pensions, hotels and inns began to be regulated and grew in number, providing options for accommodation, comfort and leisure.

However, soil exhaustion in the Paraíba Valley and the increasing restrictions imposed on the slavery regime led to a decline in the region's coffee cultivation in 1860. The valley emptied itself economically and coffee cultivation moved towards the west of the province, beginning with the Campinas and Itu areas, where it replaced the sugar cane cultivated there until then.

The migration of coffee to the west caused major economic and social changes in the province. The 1850 ban on the Atlantic slave trade led to a need for a fresh source of labor for the new crops. The Imperial and provincial governments began to encourage European immigration. The flow of exports went through the port of Santos, which led to the establishment of the first railroad, the São Paulo Railway. Inaugurated in 1867, it was built by English financial capital and the Visconde de Mauá, and linked Santos to Jundiaí through São Paulo. It became an important trading post between the coast and the coffee-growing interior.

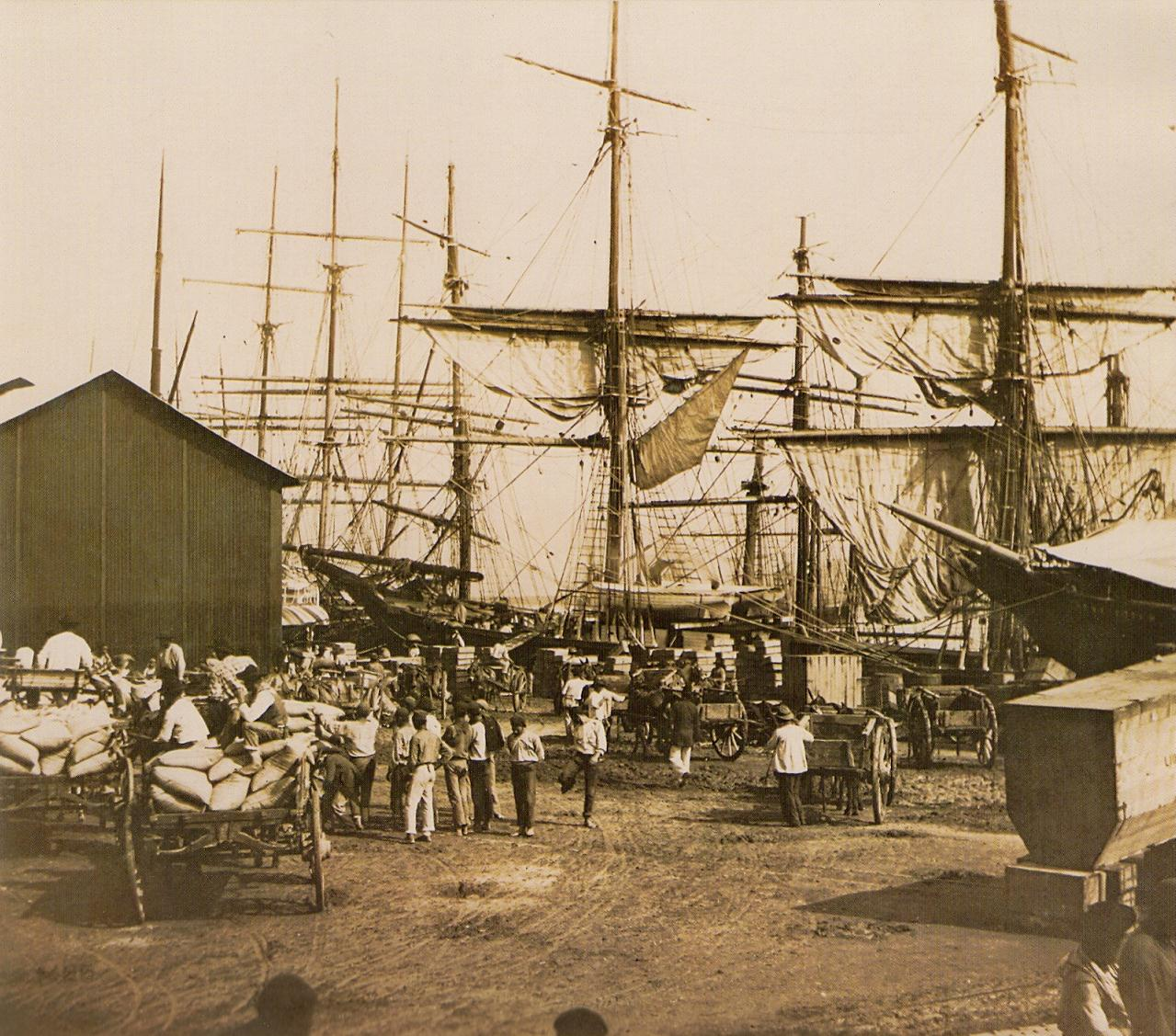
Coffee being shipped through the port of Santos in 1880, by Marc Ferrez.

Coffee-growing gradually spread into western São Paulo, passing through Campinas, Rio Claro and Porto Ferreira. In 1870, it found its most fertile fields: Terra Roxa in northeastern São Paulo state, near Ribeirão Preto, São Carlos and Jaú, where the largest and most productive coffee farms in the world arose.

Behind new lands for coffee, explorers entered the previously unexplored area between the Serra de Botucatu and the Paraná, Tietê and Paranapanema rivers, where they founded cities such as Bauru, Marília, Garça, Araçatuba and Presidente Prudente at the end of the 19th century and the beginning of the 20th century.

São Paulo's borders were defined with the emancipation of Paraná Province in 1853. The south of São Paulo (Vale do Ribeira and the region of Itapeva) did not attract coffee cultivation and suffered from border disputes between São Paulo and Paraná. This led to less development in the area compared to the rest of the province, making it yet one of the poorest regions of São Paulo.

The wealth created by coffee and the constant arrival of immigrants to the province, including Italians, Portuguese, Spanish, Japanese and Arabs, in addition to the development of a large network railroad, brought prosperity to São Paulo.

== Old Republic and the "Coffee with Milk politics" ==
When the republic was installed, the new state's economic predominance was clearly affirmed. If Brazil was coffee, coffee was São Paulo. This reality had repercussions in the national sphere, hence the homogeneity of 1894 to 1902, in three consecutive quadrenniums, under presidents Prudente de Morais, Campos Sales and Rodrigues Alves.

At the beginning of the 20th century, with the advance of the railroads towards the Paraná River, dozens of municipalities were created along the railroads: Estrada de Ferro Sorocabana, NOB and Companhia Paulista de Estradas de Ferro. Western São Paulo was populated for the first time. Because it was populated along the railroads, western São Paulo was divided into regions called Zona da Paulista, Zona da Sorocabana, Zona da Noroeste and Zona da Araraquarense. The railways were built in the highest regions, most suitable for coffee, the so-called spikes, which were less subject to frost.

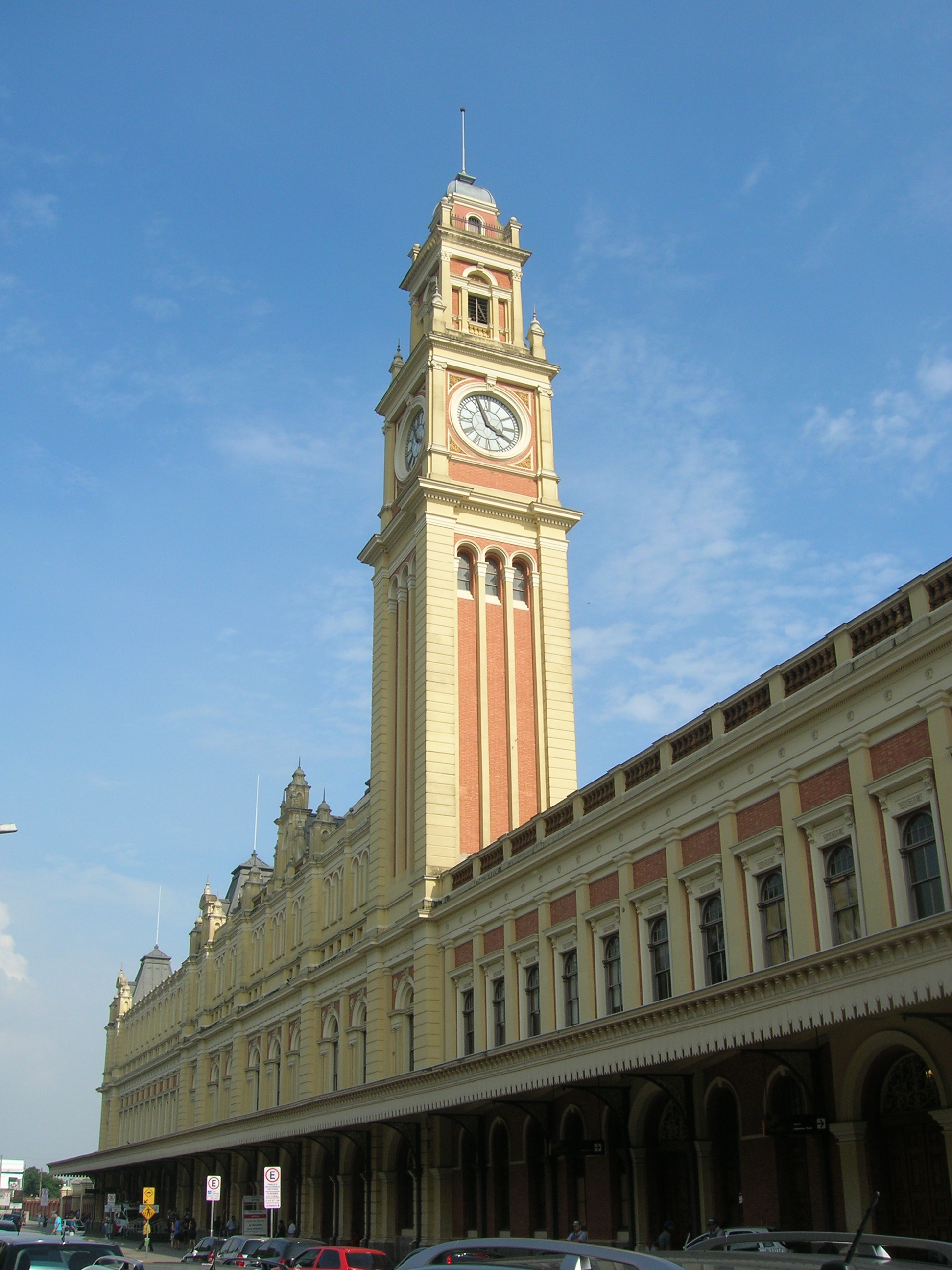
Luz Station, one of the symbols of São Paulo's power at the height of Republic of coffee with milk.

São Paulo entered the republican era with two trump cards: the wealth brought in by coffee and the free labor system, which had been introduced before the abolition of slavery and had already adapted and integrated into São Paulo's agricultural production. On the other hand, the local autonomy conferred by the new federative regime, in view of the broad rights conferred on the states, resulted in practice in real sovereignty. It came to politically and administratively reinforce the advantages conferred by the two factors above.

Thus equipped, benefiting from the institutional weakness resulting from the Proclamation of the Republic of Brazil, São Paulo combined its economic power with the electoral strength of Minas Gerais and established coffee with milk politics, a reference to São Paola coffee and Minas Gerais’ dairy production. This alliance resulted in a change in federalism in Brazil, whose results are still visible today. For this, the business vision of his businessmen, who were mainly coffee growers and even in the empire had learned to use political power in defense of their economic interests, also competed. They immediately perceived the opportunity to introduce foreign immigrants and subsidize them with resources from the province, since the imperial government paid more attention to the establishment of colonial nuclei than to salaried immigration. With the institution of the republican regime, they were able to expand their means of action. From then on, until the 1929 crash, they did not lose sight of the expansion and defense of the product that sustained the region's economy.

Despite internal dissension and several dissidents, the Partido Republicano Paulista (PRP) managed to maintain great cohesion in the face of the Union, which allowed it to carry forward a policy that generally satisfied dominant interests and undeniably contributed to the prestige of São Paulo within the federation.

However, the first republican moments in São Paulo were not peaceful. They reflected the agitations and mistakes that occurred at the federal level. As in the other states, a provisional governing board was established. Then governor Prudente de Morais was appointed, but soon resigned. The state government then passed to Jorge Tibiriçá, appointed by Deodoro da Fonseca.

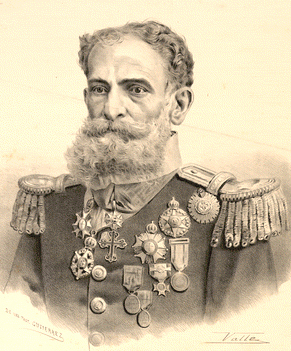
Deodoro da Fonseca, proclaimer of the Brazilian republic

In 1890 the era of political dissension was inaugurated within the PRP, with the opposition exerted by the Centro Republicano de Santos, which in an August 24, 1890 manifesto launched the candidacy of Américo Brasiliense de Almeida Melo. The faculty of law was agitated, while the main republican figures of São Paulo, such as Prudente de Morais, Manuel Ferraz de Campos Sales, Bernardino de Campos and Francisco Glicério, among others, were concerned about the authoritarianism of marshal Deodoro da Fonseca. He removed Jorge Tibiriçá and delegated power to Américo Brasiliense in 1891, who Deodoro da Fonseca considered the only one capable of organizing São Paulo.

Discontent worsened. Bitter polemics were fought between Campos Sales, through the newspaper Correio Paulistano, and Francisco Rangel Pestana, with the newspaper O Estado de S. Paulo as a mouthpiece. In this environment, on June 8, 1891, the Constituent Assembly was installed and, in July, Américo Brasiliense, already chosen president of the state, promulgated the first constitution in São Paulo.

Spirits seemed to calm when Deodoro da Fonseca's blow brought the excitement back to life. The capital and the countryside lived in apprehension under the threat of subversion of public order, which was spreading throughout the country. To avoid civil war, Deodoro resigned and the vice president, Floriano Peixoto, took over the presidency of the republic, and then received political and financial support from São Paulo against the uprisings that were spreading across the nation. In return, São Paulo assumed the hegemony of the federation with the election of Prudente de Morais in 1894, which started the series of civilian presidents.

Meanwhile, in the state, Américo Brasiliense handed over the government to Major Sérgio Tertuliano Castelo Branco, who soon passed it on to whoever was entitled: vice president José Alves de Cerqueira César. This, in the face of the spirit of riot and monarchical reaction that reigned, dissolved the Legislative Assembly, immediately called another Congress and deposed all the city councils of the state. Elections were held for deputies and senators for the second state legislature, which took place on April 7, 1892. Always showing determination and firmness, Cerqueira César called on the electorate to choose a new president of the state: Bernardino de Campos, the first São Paulo governor elected by direct suffrage.

After 1904, the mandates of the presidents of the state of São Paulo stabilized, every four years. Jorge Tibiriçá Piratininga reformed the police in São Paulo. In 1910, in a failed campaign, the paulistas supported the candidacy of Rui Barbosa to the presidency of the republic, with the president of São Paulo Albuquerque Lins as their vice. Defeated Rui Barbosa and assuming the presidency Hermes da Fonseca, São Paulo took the risk of federal intervention in Salvation Policy, however, with the election of the Counselor Rodrigues Alves, president of São Paulo from 1912 to 1916, thanks to his prestige throughout Brazil, São Paulo escaped federal intervention.

The president of São Paulo from 1916 to 1920, Dr. Altino Arantes Marques, faced the Five Greats: the Great War, the great frost of 1918, the strikes of 1917, the Spanish flu and the invasion of locusts in the interior of São Paulo.

Dr. Washington Luís, who governed São Paulo from 1920 to 1924, revolutionized São Paulo with his motto "Governing is opening roads", and currently, 19 of the 20 best Brazilian highways are from São Paulo.

In 1924, during the Carlos de Campos presidency, the 1924 Revolution took place in São Paulo, which forced Carlos de Campos to withdraw from the capital. Destruction and depredation and bombing happened on the part of the federal government. The rebels were defeated and headed for the interior of Brazil.

Dr. Washington Luís came to the presidency of the republic in 1926; however, he was deposed on October 24, 1930.

== Revolutions of 1930 and 1932 (Brazilian Civil War of 1932) ==
On March 1, 1930, the president of São Paulo, Júlio Prestes, was elected president of the republic, obtaining 91% of the valid votes in São Paulo. The Revolution of 1930 however prevented him from taking office, and also overthrew the sitting president, Washington Luís, who had been president of São Paulo from 1920 to 1924. São Paulo was then governed by the winners of the Revolution of 1930, and soon afterwards revolted, leading the Revolution of 1932. Júlio Prestes and Washington Luís were exiled. Newspapers that had supported the Progressive Republican Party (PRP) were shut down.

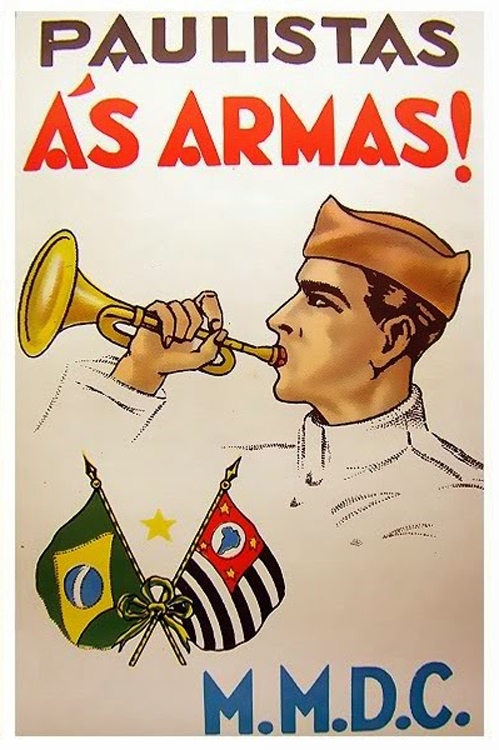
MMDC poster calling the people of São Paulo to arms.

The 1930s in São Paulo were characterized, from an economic point of view, by efforts to adjust to the conditions created by the world crisis of 1929 and by the collapse of the price of coffee. From a political point of view, the period was marked by a struggle to recover São Paulo's hegemony in the federation, reached by Aliança Liberal and finally annihilated by the revolution of 1930. This submitted the state to the action of federal interventionists, who, at first, were not even from São Paulo.

Demands for a São Paulo government soon appeared, which, in the version of the winners of the Revolution of 1930, was seen as an attempt to restore the hegemonic groups in São Paulo, whose economic and political interests were being harmed by the new situation. However, even some stakeholders, such as João Alberto Lins de Barros sought to reconcile coffee growing with the new federal government guidance.

Accustomed to leading their own destiny, the ruling classes rose up under the leadership of the Democratic Party, then chaired by Professor Francisco Morato, precisely the party allied with Getulist revolution of 1930. The political organization however broke with the federal government and constituted, with the conservative classes and the old PRP, the Frente Única Paulista (United Front of São Paulo). The latter sought alliance with other states, particularly with the opposition gaúcha, but in the end the paulistas rebelled, with the support only of troops from the State de Maracaju (now Mato Grosso do Sul).

On July 9, 1932, the constitutional revolution of São Paulo broke out. Pedro de Toledo of São Paulo was proclaimed governor and governed the state. Battalions of volunteers were formed, and some army units, a strong contingent from Mato Grosso and almost all of the state public force joined the movement. Fifty thousand men initially mobilized, whose command fell to General Bertolo Klingler, and later to Colonel Euclides de Oliveira Figueiredo.

Industry participated in the revolution with enthusiasm. Under the direction of Roberto Cochrane Simonsen, the entire industrial park in São Paulo was placed at the service of the rebellion, dedicated to war production. Internal supply lines were also organized. The fight lasted, however, only three months and ended with the defeat of the paulistas and the loss of hundreds of lives.

A few months after the surrender, the federal government, in order to pacify the country, decided to call elections for a Constituent assembly, responding to the main objective of the revolutionaries in São Paulo: the restoration of constitutional order. Meanwhile, São Paulo was under military occupation from October 1932 to August 1933. Former governor Pedro de Toledo, his secretariat, and other politicians who took an active part in the revolution were exiled.

== Industrialization and metropolization ==
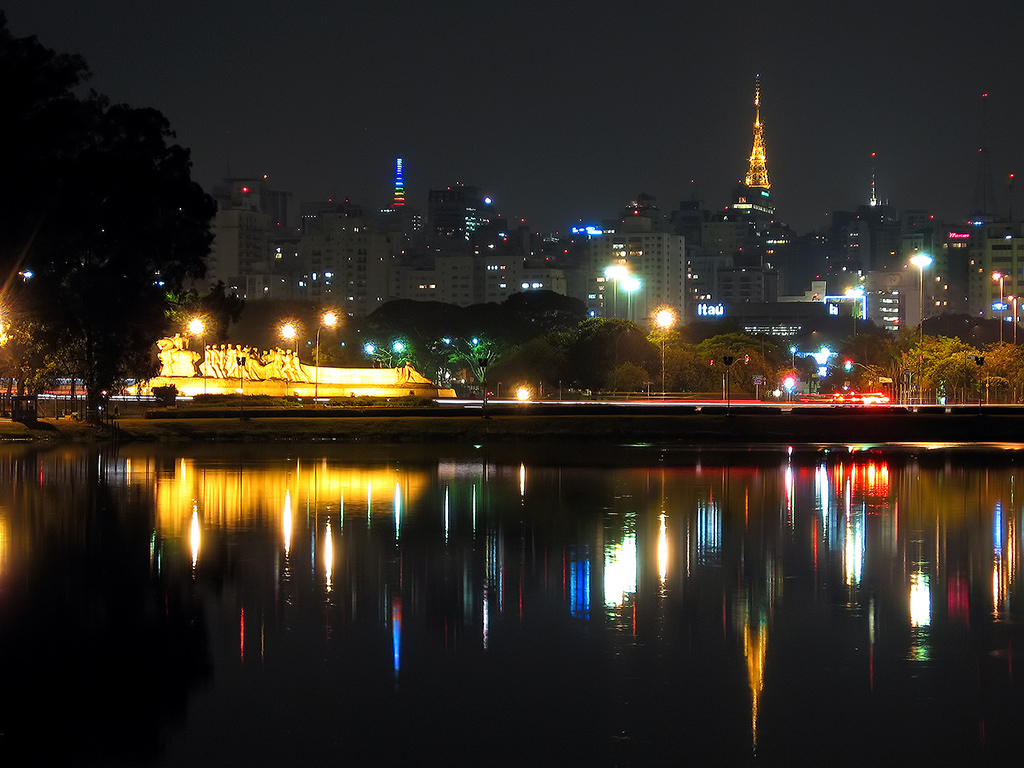
The city of São Paulo has long been the primary industrial center of the state.

After World War I, coffee cultivation faced crises of oversupply and competition from other countries. The government began to regulate by coffee production to avoid these crises. Farms shut down, sending immigrant workers towards São Paulo.

Political pressures arose demanding an end to the predominance of the São Paulo coffee elite, and artistic movements, such as the 1922 Modern Art Week considered the beginning of Brazilian Modernism, propagated new social and economic ideas. External immigration decreased and strikes by anarchists and communists broke out in São Paulo as industrial empires formed, such as that of the Matarazzo family.

In 1930 coffee entered its last crisis, the Crisis of 1929, and the crash of the New York Stock Exchange the previous year, the collapse of overseas grain prices and the Revolution of 1930, removed Paulistas from power.

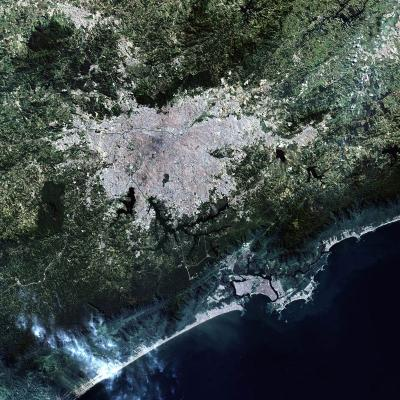
Satellite image of the Metropolitan Region of São Paulo.

Two years later, in 1932, São Paulo fought Getúlio Vargas in the Constitutionalist revolution in an attempt to retake the lost power, but was defeated militarily. The coffee crisis worsened and a rural exodus to the city of São Paulo emptied the interior of the state.

During the period of Estado Novo with Ademar de Barros as governor of the state and Francisco Prestes Maia mayor of the city of São Paulo, the state entered a new phase of development, with the construction of major highways and hydroelectric plants.

World War II interrupted imports and São Paulo industry began a process of import substitution, producing previously imported products. This process intensified under the Juscelino Kubitschek government, which laid the foundations of the automotive industry in the greater ABC Region.

To supply the necessary manpower, the state now receives millions of northeasterners, from the states of Bahia, Ceará, Pernambuco and Paraíba, who replace the earlier immigrants and now compose the São Paulo middle class as workers. These workers mainly live on the outskirts of São Paulo and in neighboring cities. This rapid population increase caused a process of metropolization, where São Paulo agglomerated with neighboring cities, forming the Metropolitan Region of São Paulo.

In 1960, the city of São Paulo became the largest Brazilian city and primary economic center in the country, surpassing Rio de Janeiro, due to the larger number of migrants to São Paulo.

In this period, São Paulo's policy was dominated by the rivalry between Janismo and Ademarismo, the two greatest political leaders in São Paulo, Ademar de Barros and Jânio Quadros.

== Industrialization of the interior ==
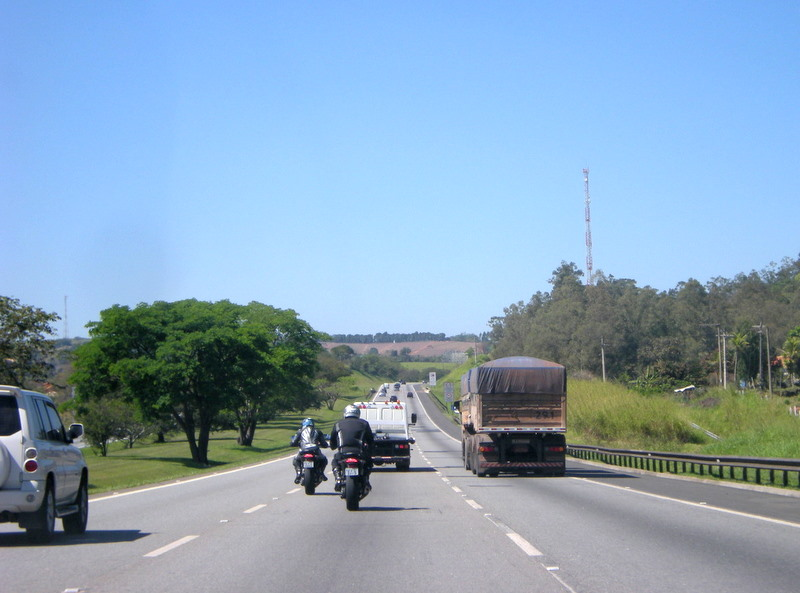
Rodovia dos Bandeirantes, a primary vector of development in the interior

In the 1960s and 1970s, the state government promoted several projects to stimulate the economy of the interior, depopulated since the coffee crash in 1930.

The Via Dutra (BR-116) supported the recovery and industrialization of the Vale do Paraíba, concentrated around the aviation industry of São José dos Campos. To the west, Viracopos International Airport, the State University of Campinas (Unicamp), the opening of highways such as Rodovia Anhanguera, Rodovia dos Bandeirantes and Rodovia Washington Luís, and the implementation of modern production techniques, especially for sugarcane and its by-product, fuel alcohol, brought progress back to the Campinas, Sorocaba, Central Administrative Region, Ribeirão Preto and Franca regions.

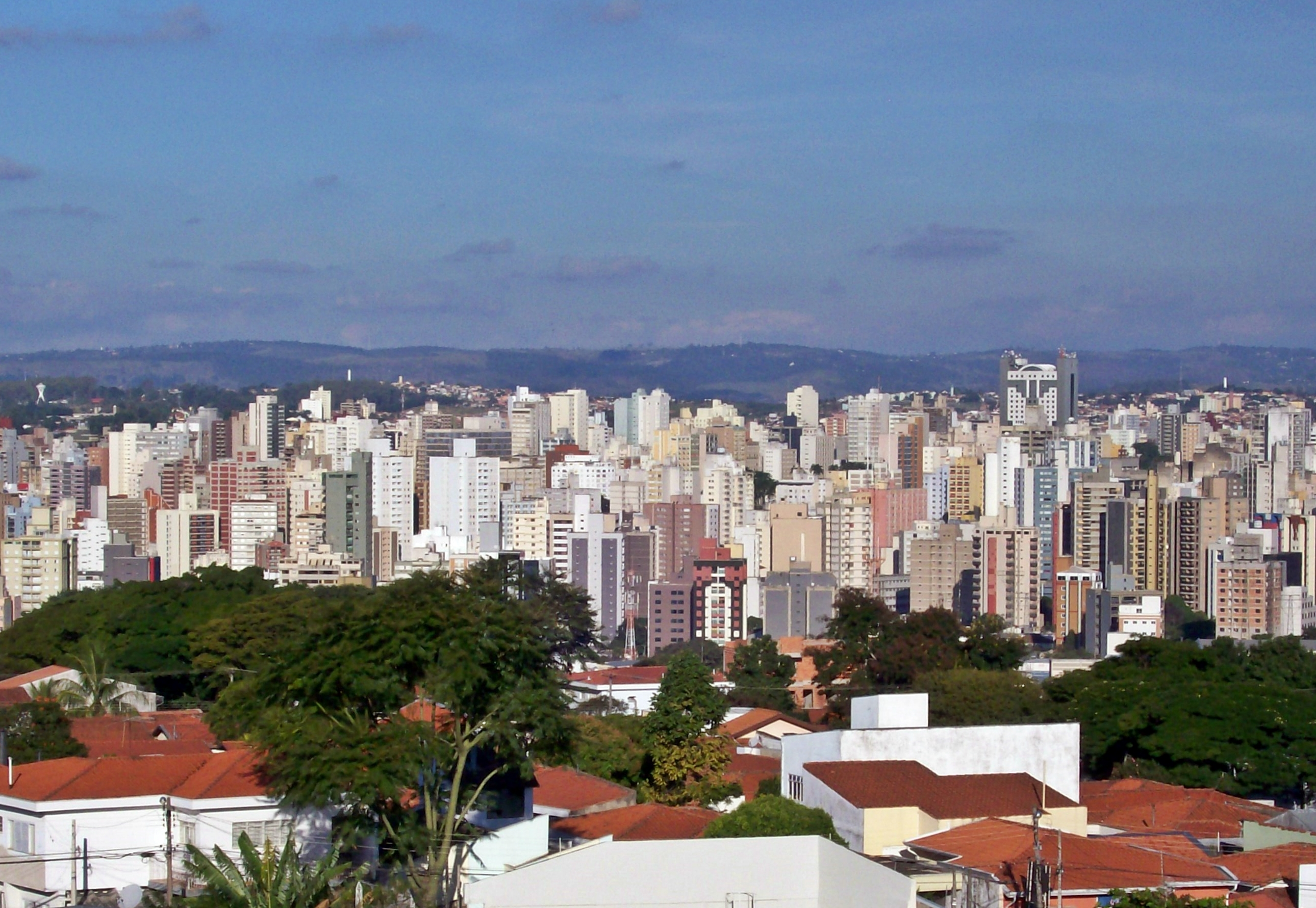
Campinas, the largest city in the state's interior

This economic recovery in the interior accelerated in the 1980s, when countless urban problems, such as violence, pollution and disorderly occupation, afflicted the Metropolitan Region of São Paulo. Between 1980 and 2000 the vast majority of investments made in the state were made outside the capital, which changed from an industrial metropolis to a center of services and finance. The interior, especially the axes between Campinas – Piracicaba – São Carlos – Ribeirão Preto – Franca and Sorocaba – São José dos Campos – Taubaté, became industrialized and prosperous.

However, even with the enrichment and industrialization of the interior, other states have an even higher rate of economic growth than São Paulo, especially the South and Central-West regions.

Currently, although growth is lower and it faces competition from other states, São Paulo is the main economic and industrial hub of South America, the largest consumer market in Brazil.

== See also ==
- State of São Paulo
- City of São Paulo
- List of people from São Paulo

== Bibliography ==
=== Environmental history ===
- JORDÃO, S. A contribuição da geomorfologia para o conhecimento da fitogeografia nativa do estado de São Paulo e da representatividade das Unidades de Conservação de Proteção Integral. Doctoral Thesis in Sciences, University of São Paulo, 2011. link.
- ENVIRONMENT SECRETARIAT (SECRETARIA DE MEIO AMBIENTE (SMA)). Nos Caminhos da Biodiversidade Paulista (Org. Marcelo Leite). São Paulo: Official Press, 2007.
- USTERI, A. Flora der umgebung der stadt São Paulo in Brasilien. Jena: G. Fischer, 1911. link.
- VICTOR, M. A. M. et al. Cem anos de devastação: revisitada 30 anos depois. Brasília: Ministry of the Environment, 2005. link.
- WANDERLEY, M.G.L. et al., coords. Flora Fanerogâmica do Estado de São Paulo. Botany Institute, São Paulo. 2001 – present. 8 vol. link.

=== Archeology and indigenous peoples ===
- AFONSO, Marisa Coutinho. Um painel da arqueologia pré-histórica no Estado de São Paulo: os sítios cerâmicos. Especiaria: Cadernos de Ciências Humanas, v. 11–12, n. 20–21, 2008–2009, p. 127-155, .
- DORNELLES, Soraia Sales. A questão indígena e o Império: índios, terra, trabalho e violência na província paulista, 1845-1891. Thesis (doctorate) - State University of Campinas, Institute of Philosophy and Human Sciences, Campinas, 2016, link.
- MONTEIRO, John et al. Índios no Estado de São Paulo: resistência e transfiguração. São Paulo: Yankatu, 1984, link.
- SCHADEN, Egon. Os primitivos habitantes do território paulista. Revista de História, v. 8, n. 18, p. 385-406, 1954.
- WICHERS, Camila Azevedo de Moraes. Mosaico Paulista: guia do patrimônio arqueológico do estado de São Paulo. São Paulo: Zanettini Arqueologia, 2010, .

=== Slavery ===
- QUEIROZ, Suely Robles Reis de. Escravidão negra em São Paulo: um estudo das tensões provocadas pelo escravismo no século XIX. Rio de Janeiro: Livraria J. Olympio Editora, 1977.

=== Coffee and industrialization ===
- DEAN, Warren. A industrialização de São Paulo (1880-1945). São Paulo: Difel, Edusp, 1971. [1a ed., 1969, link.]
- MILLIET, Sérgio. Roteiro do Café. São Paulo: Ed. Bipa, 1946.

=== Others ===
- BASSANEZI, Maria Silvia C. Beozzo; SCOTT, Ana Silvia Volpi; BACELLAR, Carlos de Almeida Prado; TRUZZI, O. M. S. Roteiro de fontes sobre a imigração em São Paulo 1850-1950. São Paulo: UNESP, 2008. 314p .
- Garschagen, Donaldson M. (1998). Nova Enciclopédia Barsa. Vol. 11. São Paulo: Encyclopædia Britannica do Brasil Publicações Ltda.
- GODOY, J. M. T. Identidade e regionalismo paulista: trajetória e mutações. Anais do XXVI Simpósio Nacional de História - ANPUH, São Paulo, July 2011, link.
- SOUZA, Ricardo Luiz de. História regional e identidade: o caso de São Paulo. História & Perspectivas, Uberlândia, 36–37, 2007, pp. 389–411, .
