= Federal Republican Party (Brazil) =

The Federal Republican Party (Portuguese: Partido Republicano Federal; PR Federal) was the first attempt at a national political party during the First Brazilian Republic. It was created in 1893, with the fusion of the Republican Party of São Paulo with state-based republican clubs.

In 1896, it fell apart due to internal crises. Even in ruins, the party held on until 1898, when Lauro Sodré ran for the presidency of the Republic against the winner Campos Sales.

== Main representatives ==
- Lauro Sodré – governor of Pará (1891–1897);
- Prudente de Morais – president of the Republic (1894–1898);
- Francisco Glicério – senator of the Republic (1891–1899);
- Manuel Vitorino – vice-presidente of the Republic (1894–1898);
