= Paulista Republican Party =

Paulista Republican Party Partido Republicano Paulista
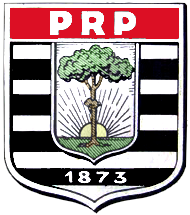
- Historical leader(s): Prudente de Morais, Campos Sales, Rodrigues Alves, Washington Luís, Júlio Prestes
- Founded: April 18, 1873
- Dissolved: December 2, 1937
- Headquarters: São Paulo
- Newspaper: Correio Paulistano
- Ideology: Republicanism; Federalism; Regionalism; Agrarianism; Milk coffee politics Conservative liberalism Secularism
- Political position: Centre-right

The Paulista Republican Party (Portuguese: Partido Republicano Paulista, PRP) was a Brazilian political party founded on April 18, 1873 during the Convention of Itu and sparked the first modern republican movement in Brazil.

Its followers were called perrepistas. PRP was the predominant political party in the state of São Paulo throughout the First Brazilian Republic. At the federal level, it allied, in most cases, with the Mineiro Republican Party (PRM) in elections and power alternation through the coffee with milk politics.

During its active period, the party elected four presidents of the republic: Campos Salles (1898), Rodrigues Alves (1902 and 1918), Washington Luís (1922), and Júlio Prestes (1930).

PRP was dissolved on December 2, 1937, during the Estado Novo.

== Origin ==
PRP was a republican party with legal existence, even during the Empire of Brazil period, founded during the Convention of Itu on April 18, 1873. It was the result of a political fusion between farmers from the Republican or Radical Club, among whom were prominent figures like Américo Brasiliense, Luís Gama, Américo de Campos, and Bernardino de Campos, Prudente de Morais, Campos Sales, Francisco Glicério, Júlio de Mesquita, and Jorge Tibiriçá Piratininga, its first president. At this first party convention, 124 delegates from various cities in the São Paulo province attended.

During the imperial period, PRP elected deputies to the General Assembly of the Empire (the current Chamber of Deputies), Campos Sales and Prudente de Morais, in the 1885-1888 legislature. In 1887, Bernardino de Campos definitively aligned the party with abolitionism, saving it from the crisis caused by the pro-slavery inclination of landowners.

Its official organ was the newspaper "Correio Paulistano", which, during the Second Reign, belonged to the Conservative Party and was destroyed in 1930 with the victory of the Revolution of 1930, but it resumed circulation and finally ceased its activities in the 1960s. Other newspapers that supported PRP were also destroyed in 1930, including "A Plateia", "A Gazeta," and "Folha da Manhã," the current Folha de S. Paulo.

Its members consisted of liberal professionals (lawyers, doctors, engineers, etc.), known as the liberal classes, and above all, important rural landowners from São Paulo, coffee growers, known as the conservative classes, supporters of European immigration for coffee plantations and also supporters of the abolition of slavery.

Almost all the leadership of PRP, at the time called "próceres," were members of the Freemasons. Meetings of the PRP leadership in the editorial office of Correio Paulistano were traditional.

Its first newspaper was "A Província de S. Paulo," now O Estado de S. Paulo, founded in 1875 by the historical republicans, including Campos Sales.

The primary goal of PRP was to establish a republican federation in Brazil with a high degree of administrative decentralization, which did not exist during the imperial period (1822-1889).

Another important demand of the Republicans was the return of taxes collected by the union to the originating province (later states).

PRP remained in opposition from its foundation in 1873 until the Proclamation of the Republic. After the 1930 Revolution, it returned to being an opposition party. PRP remained in opposition from 1930 until its extinction with the advent of the Estado Novo in 1937. In other words, it started on April 18, 1873, and ended on December 2, 1937.

== Old Republic ==
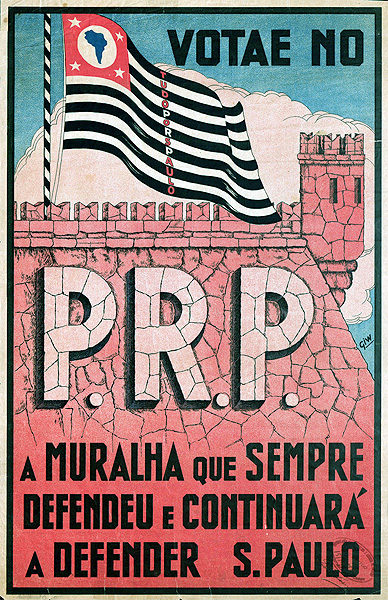
Party poster calling for votes. "The wall that always defended and will continue to defend São Paulo."

With the Proclamation of the Republic on November 15, 1889, a new cycle of political power began in Brazil known as the Old Republic.

The Old Republic was divided into two periods. Initially, the so-called Sword Republic was established, with the military governments of Marshal Deodoro da Fonseca and Marshal Floriano Peixoto consolidating the republican regime in Brazil.

After the military left federal power, the Coffee with Milk politics or Oligarchic Republic originated, with the country being governed by civilian presidents strongly influenced by the agrarian sector of the economy.

PRP, through its main leader and ideologue Campos Sales with his "Politics of the States," which was better known as the Governors' Politics, was the political party that played a decisive role in removing the military from politics at the beginning of the Republic.

Campos Sales expressed his opinion on this matter:

Others gave my policy the name "Politics of the Governors." They would have been right if they had said "Politics of the States." This name would better express my thought!

— Campos Sales

And he defined the coffee with milk politics and the politics of the states as follows:

If we found ourselves in normal conditions of political life, with well-defined political parties, each obeying the authority of their legitimate leaders... I would remain in a neutral position to offer all electoral guarantees to the contenders. But the situation of the republic is different... and it is necessary to avoid, with determined effort, the agitations without a basis in the national interest that would only serve to bring disruptive ambitions to the political arena, which have always been and will always be eternal obstacles to the effectiveness of administrative action... (and explains the need for a vice-president from Minas Gerais for Rodrigues Alves)... I have reasons to believe that Minas will only accept the combination if a person from Minas is also included, and to avoid obstacles, I consider it appropriate to indicate Silviano Brandão as vice president!

— Campos Sales

In this regime, as I said in my last message, the true political force that, in the tight unitarianism of the Empire, resided in the central power, has shifted to the states. The Politics of the States, that is, the politics that strengthens the bonds of harmony between the states and the Union, is, therefore, in its essence, national politics. It is there, in the sum of these autonomous units, that the true sovereignty of public opinion is found. What the states think, the Union thinks!

— Campos Sales

The federal political power, in the Coffee with Milk Republic, had its governability guaranteed by the Politics of the States. Federal deputies and senators did not hinder the president's politics, and the president did not interfere in state governments. The states were guaranteed broad administrative autonomy in their own affairs. The federal power did not interfere in the internal politics of the states, and state governments did not interfere in municipal politics, ensuring political autonomy and national tranquility.

The President of the Republic supported the actions of state presidents, such as the selection of their successors, and in return, the governors provided support and political assistance to the federal government, collaborating in the election of candidates for the Federal Senate and the Chamber of Deputies who fully supported the President of the Republic. Thus, the state delegations in the Federal Senate and the Chamber of Deputies did not pose obstacles to the president of the republic, who freely conducted his government.

Each state of the Brazilian federation had its own Republican Party, but they were not connected to each other and were autonomous.

Representatives of the Paulista Republican Party and the Mineiro Republican Party (PRM) alternated in federal power. They controlled the elections and enjoyed the support of the agrarian elite, at the time called the conservative classes, from other states in Brazil.

With the new republican regime, PRP ceased to be a party of social class and opposition, as it was during the Second Reign, when it was, in fact, a vehicle for the political demands of the great abolitionist coffee planters who used European wage labor.

With the Republic, the party also became an institution dedicated to state bureaucracy, with the need for state and municipal governments to comply with the directives of the PRP leadership.

Thus, PRP, upon gaining power with the republic, put into practice its political program of administrative decentralization, establishment of schools, defense of coffee, modernization of the state and the economy, and separation of the Catholic Church from the Brazilian state.

PRP only had legal existence within the Paulista territory, and with the extinction of the Conservative and Liberal Party after the proclamation of the republic, it became practically the only existing political party in the state of São Paulo. Some political parties had ephemeral existence in the state of São Paulo at the beginning of the Republic.

PRP elected all the presidents of São Paulo and all state senators and deputies. PRP faced weak competition from the Republican Federal Party (PRF) of Francisco Glicério, with a municipalist ideology, and the Conservative Republican Party (PRC).

It was up to Campos Sales, when president of the State of São Paulo, in 1897 and 1898, to weaken the PRF and municipalism by pressuring the interior colonels to join PRP. In exchange for support for PRP and the state president, the colonels had their local power guaranteed and respected.

Campos Sales' actions in the government of São Paulo were like an embryo of what he would later do at the national level: the Politics of the States or the Governors' Politics. One of the interior leaders of São Paulo who joined PRP because of Campos Sales' politics and later became an important leader (prócer) of PRP was Dr. Washington Luís.

PRP was greatly influenced by the ideals of Freemasonry and positivism, and PRP had a true obsession with European immigration.

At the municipal level, there were political disputes when more than one colonel contested local power. In these cases, politicians from the capital divided themselves, supporting one or another colonel for municipal positions.

In the small towns in the interior of São Paulo, the local leader of PRP was typically a colonel, usually the leader of the local Masonic Lodge. Sometimes, two or more colonels competed for control of the local PRP. Local political groups were given nicknames like the Araras against the Pica-Paus (woodpeckers). However, there was always a single candidate for the presidency of the state. The colonels supported the politics of the state presidents in exchange for the presidents respecting the local power of the colonel.

There were at least four dissidences within PRP, led by politicians dissatisfied with the PRP leadership and who were bypassed in the choice of PRP candidates for the presidency of the state or other important positions.

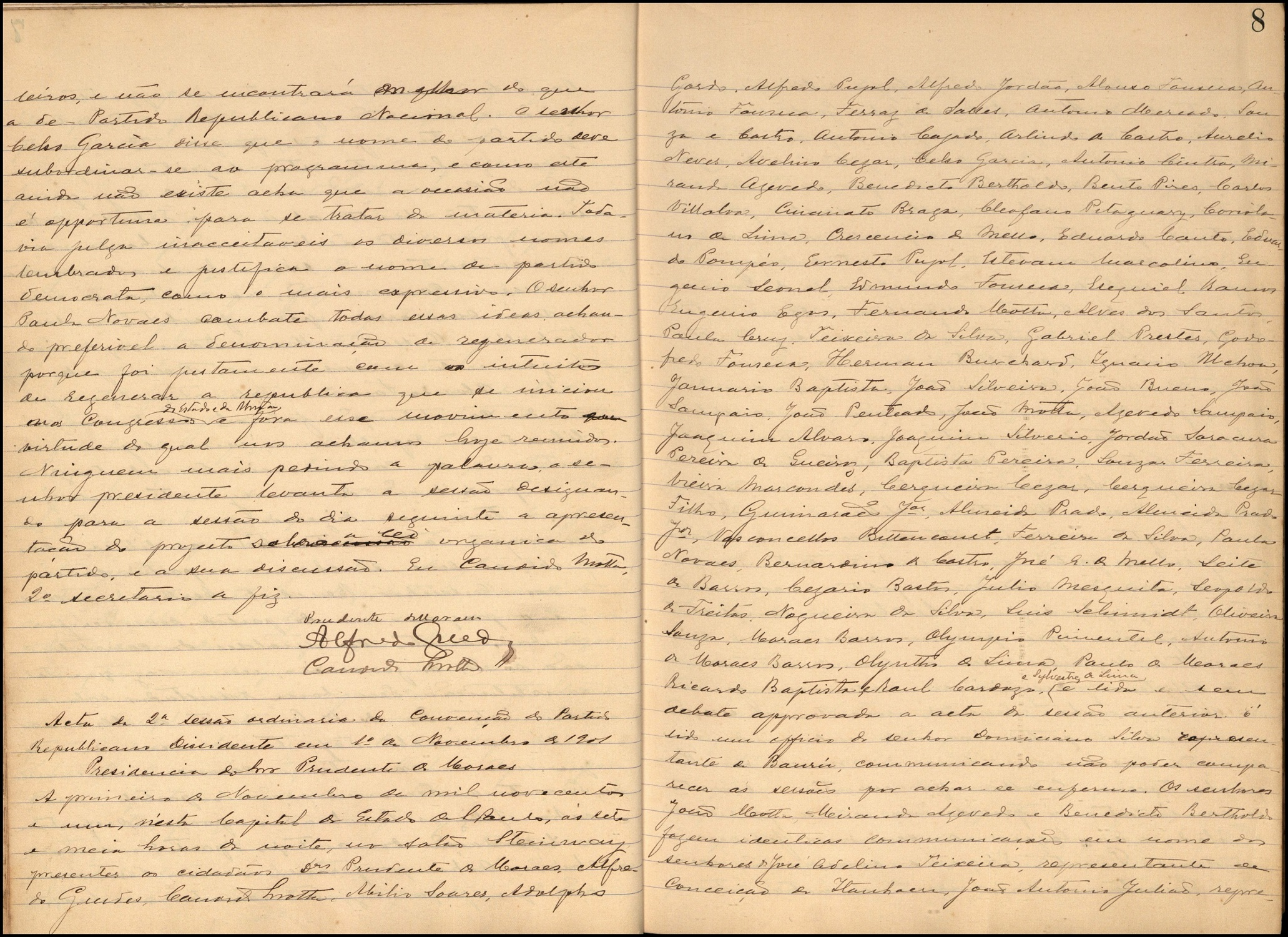
Minutes of the Convention, handwritten, of the Dissident Paulista Republican Party, produced in 1901(?), and signed by Prudente de Moraes, Alfredo Queiroz(?).

In 1901, Prudente de Moraes and other deputies founded the Dissident Paulista Republican Party (PRDSP). The final dissidence resulted in the creation of the Democratic Party in February 1926, a party that supported the 1930 Revolution. This last dissidence of PRP originated from a crisis in the São Paulo Masonry, and Dr. José Adriano Marrey Júnior, the grandmaster of the Grand Orient of São Paulo, founded the Democratic Party.

The first major electoral dispute between PRP and the Democratic Party occurred in 1928 for the mayoralty of the city of São Paulo through direct vote, when PRP was overwhelmingly victorious, reelecting Mayor Dr. José Pires do Rio.

The most serious attack on the power of PRP was the São Paulo Revolt of 1924, which caused President Carlos de Campos to withdraw to the interior of the state and organize battalions to defend legality, managing to regain power. Many important members of PRP wore uniforms of the São Paulo Public Force, currently the Military Police of the State of São Paulo, organized and commanded the resistance against the rebels.

PRP elected all the presidents of the State of São Paulo in the Old Republic and elected six presidents of the Republic, although two of them did not take office: Rodrigues Alves when reelected in 1918 did not take office due to his death, and Júlio Prestes due to the 1930 Revolution. Dr. Washington Luís was deposed in 1930.

Washington Luís was a modernizer of PRP, establishing a technical administration, both in the Secretary of Justice and Public Security (in the so-called "politics without politics"), and in the Mayor of São Paulo and the state government.

PRP was defeated in the presidential elections of 1910 when the São Paulo president Albuquerque Lins was the vice-presidential candidate on Rui Barbosa's ticket in the so-called Civilist Campaign.

The political leaders of PRP gained a reputation as good administrators and upright men, and several were considered statesmen.

In general, PRP, in the Old Republic, was commanded by the current state president. The leaders who had the most strength on the executive board of PRP were President Jorge Tibiriçá Piratininga, who died in 1928, Colonel Fernando Prestes de Albuquerque, and Dr. Altino Arantes Marques, both deceased after the end of the Old Republic.

== 1930 Revolution ==
On March 1, 1930, the presidential candidate of the Republic Party (PRP), Júlio Prestes, received 90% of the valid votes in the State of São Paulo. It was another major victory for the PRP against the Democratic Party, which supported the opposition candidate Getúlio Vargas. However, Júlio Prestes did not take office as he was overthrown by the 1930 Revolution.

With the 1930 revolution, several political leaders of the PRP, including the elected president Júlio Prestes, who had resigned from the government of São Paulo, and President Washington Luís, were exiled. Heitor Penteado, the acting vice-president of São Paulo and president of the state, was deposed on October 24, 1930, arrested, and exiled. The PRP would no longer govern São Paulo.

The 1930 Revolution and the rise of Getúlio Vargas to power broke this cycle, leading to the extinction of all parties, which only returned in the 1933 elections. The domination of the "coffee with milk" politics (represented by the PRP and the PRM) was also abolished.

From 1930 onwards, with few exceptions, politicians from Rio Grande do Sul and Minas Gerais would alternate in the presidency until the 1980s. In the 50 years following 1930, politicians from Rio Grande do Sul and Minas Gerais held federal power for 41 years. Júlio Prestes was the last elected president from São Paulo until the election of Jair Bolsonaro in 2018.

According to the revolutionaries of 1930, Brazil demanded modernity through political and cultural manifestations, with premonitions of what would happen in 1930, given by the Semana de Arte Moderna de 1922 (which, however, was supported by the President of São Paulo at the time, Washington Luís, and by the Correio Paulistano, and in which two members of the PRP participated: Plínio Salgado and Menotti Del Picchia), and by the Copacabana Fort revolt of 1922 and the São Paulo Revolt of 1924, which aimed to overthrow the perrepista government of Carlos de Campos.

According to the revolutionaries' perspective, the 1930 Revolution, with all its difficulties, raised the country to the contemporary world.

However, from the perspective of the perrepista leader, Júlio Prestes, who was elected president in 1930, the dictatorship established in 1930 dishonored Brazil:

What is incomprehensible is that a nation like Brazil, after over a century of constitutional life and liberalism, would regress to an unchecked and limitless dictatorship like the one that degrades and humiliates us before the civilized world!

— Júlio Prestes

In the 1932 Constitutionalist Revolution, the PRP and the Democratic Party joined forces to fight against the dictatorship of the "Provisional Government." In 1933, the PRP participated in the elections for the National Constituent Assembly through the "United Front for United São Paulo," which was the last time in the history of São Paulo that the political forces of São Paulo marched together.

In its final years, the PRP launched its last star in politics as a constituent state deputy, Adhemar Pereira de Barros. During this time, the PRP opposed Governor Armando de Sales Oliveira and did not support him when he ran for president in the elections scheduled for January 1938.

The PRP was definitively extinct shortly after the establishment of the Estado Novo by Decree-Law No. 37 on December 2, 1937. Adhemar de Barros and Fernando Costa, historical perrepistas, were appointed interveners of São Paulo during the dictatorship.

With the return of political parties in 1945, the remnants of the old PRP formed the São Paulo section of the Social Democratic Party, except for Júlio Prestes and elements connected to Washington Luís, who participated in the founding of the National Democratic Union, and Adhemar de Barros and his followers, who created the Progressive Republican Party and shortly thereafter the Progressive Social Party.

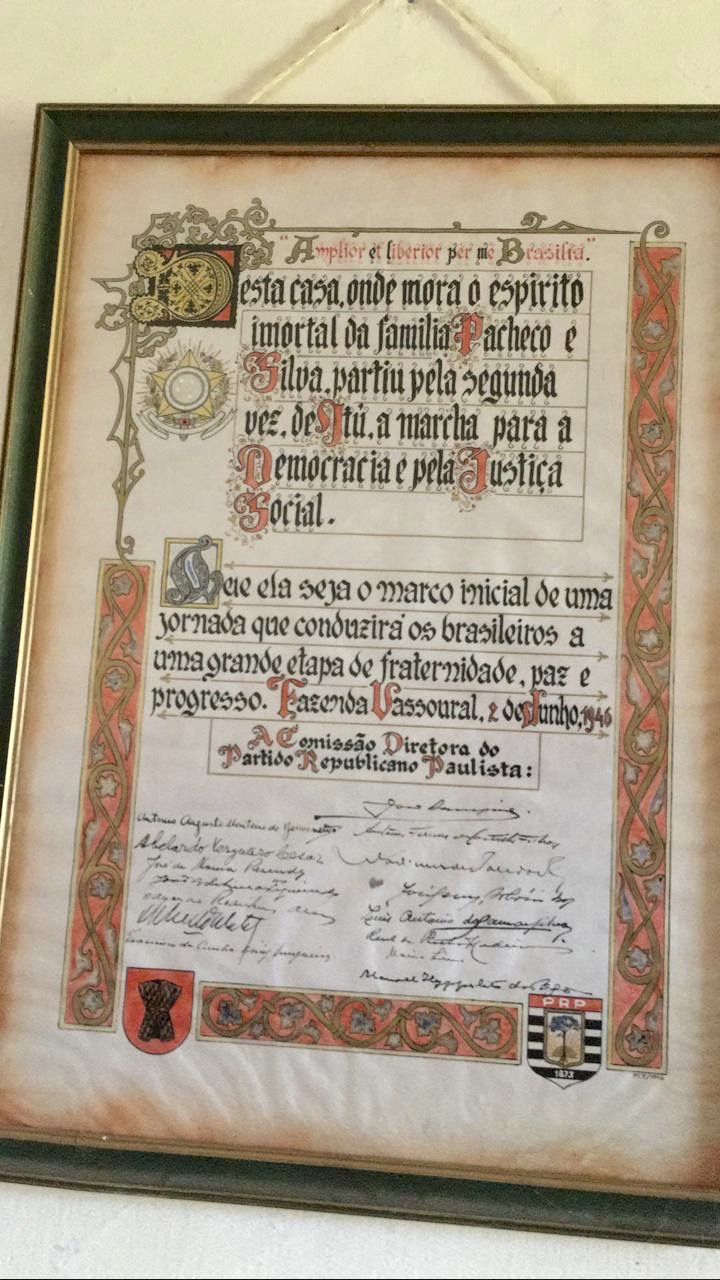
Minutes of the Meeting of the Directing Committee of the Paulista Republican Party at Fazenda Vassoural in Itu - São Paulo, June 2, 1946.

== Main Representatives ==
- Antônio da Silva Prado - Mayor of São Paulo (1899-1910)
- Prudente de Morais - Party member from 1873 to 1893 and President of the Republic (1894-1898)
- Campos Sales - President of the Republic (1898-1902)
- Rodrigues Alves - President of the Republic (1902-1906) and reelected in 1918, but did not take office
- Washington Luís - President of the Republic (1926-1930)
- Júlio Prestes - President-elect (term: 1930-1934; did not take office), President of São Paulo (1927-1930)
- Francisco Rangel Pestana
- José Alves de Cerqueira César
- Bernardino de Campos - President of São Paulo (1892-1896)
- Jorge Tibiriçá - President of São Paulo (1904-1908)
- Albuquerque Lins - President of São Paulo (1908-1912)
- Altino Arantes - President of São Paulo (1916-1920)
- Carlos de Campos - President of São Paulo (1924-1927)
- Fernando Prestes de Albuquerque - President of São Paulo (1898-1900)
- Mário Tavares - São Paulo state senator
- José de Freitas Valle - São Paulo state senator
- Augusto César de Miranda Azevedo - Physician, President of the Chamber of the Legislative Congress of the State of São Paulo from 1891 to 1892, and state deputy for three terms (1891-1892, 1895-1897, and 1898-1900)
- Antônio de Lacerda Franco - State senator and senator of the Republic
- Paulino Carlos de Arruda Botelho
- José Ignácio de Camargo Penteado -
- Marcolino Lopes Barretto -
- Rodolfo Fernandes Gastão de Sá - Physician from São Carlos-SP
- José Augusto de Oliveira Salles -
- Raphael Augusto de Souza Campos - Mayor, councilman of Tietê-SP, and state deputy
- Elias Augusto de Camargo Salles - Farmer and mayor of São Carlos-SP, twice
- José Franco de Camargo - Coffee farmer in São Carlos-SP
- Paulino Botelho de Abreu Sampaio - Farmer and mayor of São Carlos-SP, twice
- Antônio Militão de Lima - Farmer and mayor of São Carlos-SP
- José Fonseca Teixeira de Barros - Farmer and mayor of São Carlos-SP
- Joaquim Evangelista de Toledo - Mayor of São Carlos-SP
- Dona Sinhára Toledo - Widow of Joaquim Evangelista de Toledo
- Roberto Simonsen
- Adhemar Pereira de Barros
- Fernando Costa
- César Vergueiro
- Cirilo Júnior
- Martinho Prado Júnior
- Cândido Nogueira da Mota
- Cincinato Braga
- Heitor Penteado
- Jorge Americano
- Elói Chaves
- Plínio Salgado
- Cândido Rodrigues
- Francisco Glicério
- Manuel Pedro Vilaboim
- José Alvares de Rubião Júnior
- Adolfo Antônio da Silva Gordo
- Américo Brasiliense
- Ataliba Leonel
- Alfredo Ellis Júnior
- Álvaro Augusto da Costa Carvalho
- Olavo Egídio de Sousa Aranha
- Cesário Bastos
- Carlos José Botelho
- Oscar Rodrigues Alves
- Virgílio Rodrigues Alves
- Antônio Cândido Rodrigues
- Antônio Dino da Costa Bueno
- Carlos José de Arruda Botelho
- Américo de Campos
- José Adriano Marrey Júnior
- Alfredo Ellis
- Menotti del Picchia
- Deodato Wertheimer
- José Pires de Andrade

== Electoral results ==
=== Presidential elections ===
| Election | Candidate | Running mate | Colligation | First round | | Second round | | Result | Sources |
| Election | Candidate | Running mate | Colligation | Votes | % | Votes | % | Result | Sources |
|---|---|---|---|---|---|---|---|---|---|
| 1891 | Prudente de Morais (PRP) | None | None | 97 | 41.45% (#2) | - | - | Lost ✗ | |
| 1891 | None | Floriano Peixoto (Independent) | None | 153 | 65.38% (#1) | - | - | Elected ✓ | |
| 1891 | None | Prudente de Morais (PRP) | None | 12 | 5.13% (#3) | - | - | Lost ✗ | |
| 1894 | Prudente de Morais (PR Federal) | None | PR Federal; PRP | 290,883 | 88.38% (#1) | - | - | Elected ✓ | |
| 1894 | None | Manuel Vitorino Pereira (PR Federal) | PR Federal; PRP | 266,060 | 78.36% (#1) | - | - | Elected ✓ | |
| 1898 | Campos Sales (PRP) | None | PRP; PRM | 420,286 | 91.52% (#1) | - | - | Elected ✓ | |
| 1898 | None | Rosa e Silva (PR Federal) | PR Federal; PRP; PRM | 412,074 | 89.45% (#1) | - | - | Elected ✓ | |
| 1902 | Rodrigues Alves (PRP) | None | PRP; PRM | 592,038 | 93.30% (#1) | - | - | Elected ✓ | |
| 1902 | None | Silviano Brandão (PRM) | PRM; PRP | 563,734 | 87.83% (#1) | - | - | Elected ✓ | |
| 1902 | None | Rodrigues Alves (PRP) | None | 4 | 0.0006% | - | - | Lost ✗ | |
| 1906 | Afonso Pena (PRM) | None | PRM; PRP | 288,285 | 97.92% (#1) | - | - | Elected ✓ | |
| 1906 | Campos Sales (PRP) | None | None | 95 | 0.032% (#3) | - | - | Lost ✗ | |
| 1906 | None | Nilo Peçanha (PRF) | PRF; PRM; PRP | 272,529 | 92.96% (#1) | - | - | Elected ✓ | |
| 1910 | Ruy Barbosa (PRP) | None | None | 222,822 | 31.51% (#2) | - | - | Lost ✗ | |
| 1910 | None | Manuel Joaquim de Albuquerque Lins (PRP) | None | 219,106 | 35.00% (#2) | - | - | Lost ✗ | |
| 1914 | Venceslau Brás (PRM) | None | PRM; PRP; PPR; PRF | 532,107 | 91.58% (#1) | - | - | Elected ✓ | |
| 1914 | None | Urbano Santos (PRM) | PRM; PRP; PPR; PRF | 556,127 | 96.21% (#1) | - | - | Elected ✓ | |
| 1918 | Rodrigues Alves (PRP) | None | PRP; PRM | 386,467 | 99.03% (#1) | - | - | Elected ✓ | |
| 1918 | None | Delfim Moreira (PRM) | PRM; PRP | 382,491 | 99.42% (#1) | - | - | Elected ✓ | |
| 1919 | Epitácio Pessoa (PRM) | None | PRM; PRP | 286,373 | 70.96% (#1) | - | - | Elected ✓ | |
| 1919 | Ruy Barbosa (PRP) | None | None | 116,414 | 28,85% (#2) | - | - | Lost ✗ | |
| 1922 | Artur Bernardes (PRM) | None | PRM; PRP | 466,972 | 59.46% (#1) | - | - | Elected ✓ | |
| 1922 | Washington Luís (PRP) | None | None | 149 | 0.01% (#4) | - | - | Lost ✗ | |
| 1922 | None | Urbano Santos (PRM) | PRM; PRP | 447,595 | 56.85% (#1) | - | - | Elected ✓ | |
| 1922 | None | Washington Luís (PRP) | None | 368 | 0.03% (#3) | - | - | Lost ✗ | |
| 1926 | Washington Luís (PRP) | None | PRP; PRM | 688,528 | 99.70% (#1) | - | - | Elected ✓ | |
| 1926 | None | Fernando de Melo Viana (PRM) | PRM; PRP | 685,754 | 99.62% (#1) | - | - | Elected ✓ | |
| 1926 | None | Washington Luís (PRP) | None | 208 | 0.030% (#5) | - | - | Lost ✗ | |
| 1930 | Júlio Prestes (PRP) | None | PRP; PRB | 1,091,709 | 59.39% (#1) | - | - | Elected ✓ | |
| 1930 | None | Vital Soares (PRB) | PRB; PRP | 1,079,360 | 59.67% (#1) | - | - | Elected ✓ | |
| 1934 | None | None | None | - | - | - | - | - | |

== See also ==
- João de Sousa Campos (1813–1880)

== Sources ==
- __________, Dados Biográficos dos Senadores de São Paulo - 1826-1998 [Biographical Data of Senators from São Paulo - 1826-1998], Senado Federal, Brasília.
- ALMEIDA FILHO, José Carlos de Araújo, O Ensino Jurídico, a Elite dos Bacharéis e a Maçonaria do Séc. XIX [Legal Education, the Elite of Bachelor's Degrees, and Freemasonry in the 19th Century], Dissertation presented in stricto sensu postgraduate program in the area of Law, State, and Citizenship, Universidade Gama Filho, as a requirement for obtaining the title of Master, Rio de Janeiro, 2005.
- BARBOSA, Rui, Campanhas Presidenciais [Presidential Campaigns], Livraria Editora Iracema Ltda, São Paulo, n.d.
- BELLO, José Maria, História da República [History of the Republic], São Paulo, Companhia Editora Nacional, 1976.
- CASALECCHI, José Ênio, O Partido Republicano Paulista: política e poder (1889-1926) [The Paulista Republican Party: Politics and Power (1889-1926)], São Paulo, Editora Brasiliense, 1987.
- CASTELLANI, José, A Maçonaria na Década da Abolição e da República [Freemasonry in the Decade of Abolition and the Republic], Editora A Trolha, 2001.
- DEBES, Célio, Constituição, estrutura e atuação do partido republicano de São Paulo na Propaganda (1872 - 1889) [Constitution, Structure, and Performance of the Paulista Republican Party in Propaganda (1872-1889)], Master's Thesis in History, Universidade de São Paulo, São Paulo, 1975.* DEBES, Célio, Júlio Prestes e a primeira República [Júlio Prestes and the First Republic], São Paulo, Edição Arquivo do Estado - IMESP, 1983.
- EGAS, Eugênio, Galeria dos Presidentes de São Paulo e vice-presidentes [Gallery of Presidents and Vice-Presidents of São Paulo], Seção de Obras de "O Estado de S. Paulo," 3 volumes, 1927.
- LEITE, Aureliano, História da Civilização Paulista [History of Paulista Civilization], Monumental Edition of the IV Centennial of the City of São Paulo, 1954.
- LIMA, Sandra Lúcia Lopes, O oeste paulista e a república [The West of São Paulo and the Republic], Editora Vértice, 1986.
- OLIVEIRA, Percival de - O ponto de vista do PRP: uma campanha política [The PRP's Point of View: A Political Campaign], São Paulo, São Paulo Editora, 1930.
- SALES, Alberto - A pátria paulista [The Paulista Homeland], Brasília, Editora da UnB, 1983.
- SALES, Manuel Ferraz de Campos, Da propaganda à presidência [From Propaganda to the Presidency], Senado Federal, 2000.
- SANTOS, José Maria dos, Bernardino de Campos e o Partido Republicano Paulista [Bernardino de Campos and the Paulista Republican Party], Rio de Janeiro, Editora Jose Olympio, 1960.
- ZIMMERMANN, Maria Emilia, O PRP e os fazendeiros do café [The PRP and Coffee Farmers], Campinas, Editora da UNICAMP, 1986.
