= Júlio de Mesquita Filho =

Brazilian journalist

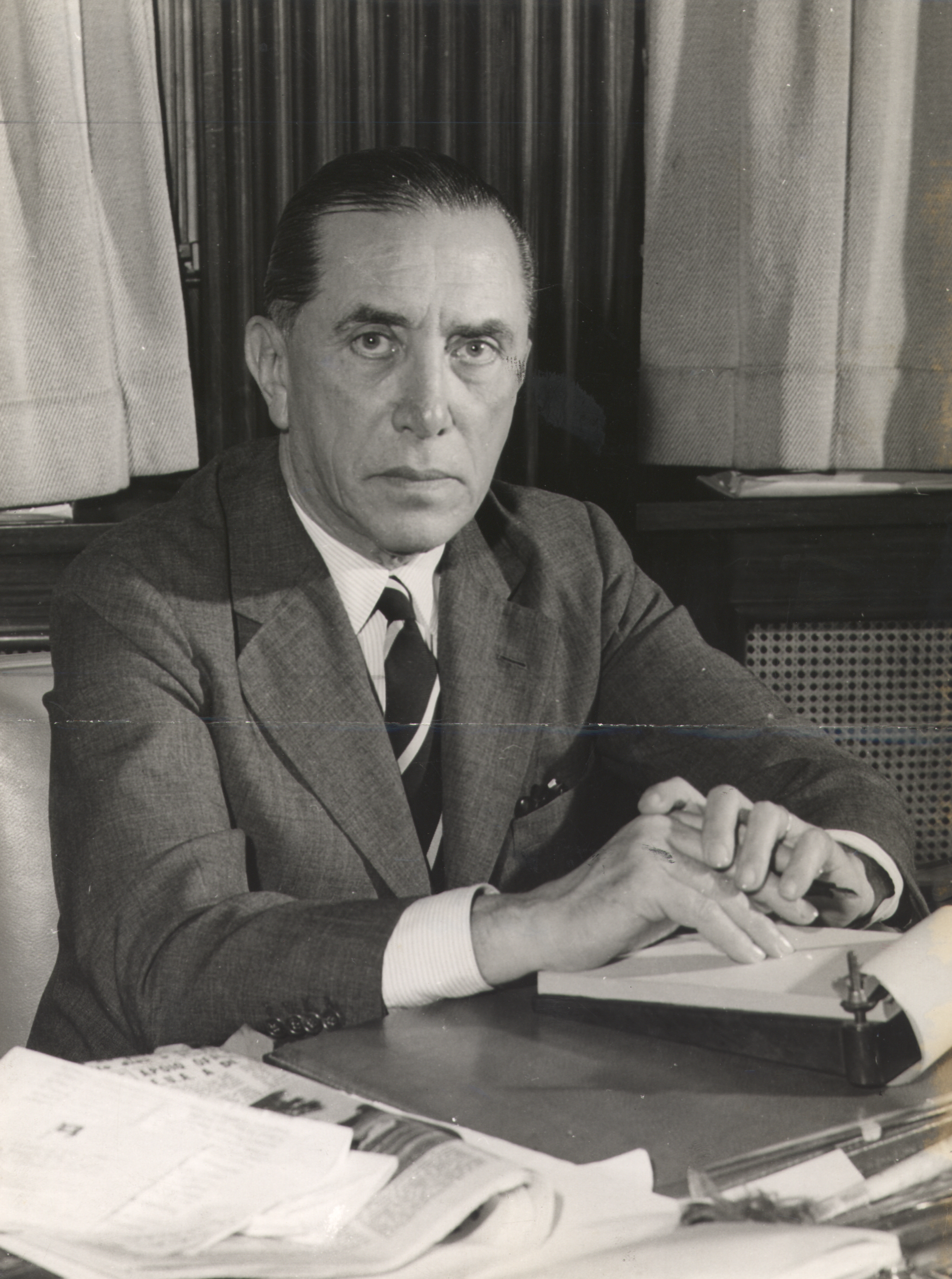
- Born: February 14, 1892; São Paulo, São Paulo (state), Brazil
- Died: July 12, 1969 (aged 77); São Paulo, São Paulo, Brazil
- Education: Faculty of Law of São Paulo
- Occupations: Journalist, businessman

Júlio César Ferreira de Mesquita Filho (February 14, 1892 – July 12, 1969) was a Brazilian journalist, businessman, intellectual, and media mogul. Owner of the traditional newspaper O Estado de S. Paulo, Mesquita Filho helped found the University of São Paulo. The São Paulo State University is named in his honor.

== Biography ==
Born into a wealthy family of Portuguese descent, he was the son of Júlio de Mesquita. Mesquita Filho completed his elementary education in Europe before enrolling at the Faculty of Law of São Paulo, from which he graduated. In 1926, as an established journalist, he became one of the founding members of the Democratic Party, which rivalled with the Paulista Republican Party. By the end of the decade, Mesquita Filho was drawing closer to the Liberal Alliance, a nationalist party led by Getúlio Vargas.

Having supported the Revolution of 1930, which overthrew the rural oligarchies and installed Getúlio Vargas as head of state, Mesquita Filho later opposed Vargas' authoritarian rule, helping to organise the movement known as Constitutionalist Revolution of 1932. Defeated, he was exiled for a brief period. Upon his return to Brazil, Mesquita Filho, together with his brother-in-law Armando de Sales Oliveira and a group of intellectuals, entrepreneurs, and politicians, contributed to the foundation of the University of São Paulo, which was projected as a center for forming a new Brazilian political and cultural elite.

Following the establishment of the Estado Novo, Mesquita Filho was arrested several times and once again forced into exile, spending many years in Paris and Buenos Aires. With the advent of the Fourth Brazilian Republic, Mesquita Filho positioned himself as an opponent of the populist and left-wing Brazilian Labour Party as well as a critic of the conservative National Democratic Union.

In 1964, Mesquita Filho supported the military coup d'état that deposed João Goulart and instituted a purportedly provisional government. However, following the issuance of the Institutional Act n.º 2 (pt), which signaled the government's shift towards a dictatorship, Mesquita Filho came to an overt opposition, which caused his newspaper to be censored after the Institutional Act n.º 5.

He died in July 1969, aged 77, after gastric surgery.
