= Francisco Glicério =

Brazilian politician

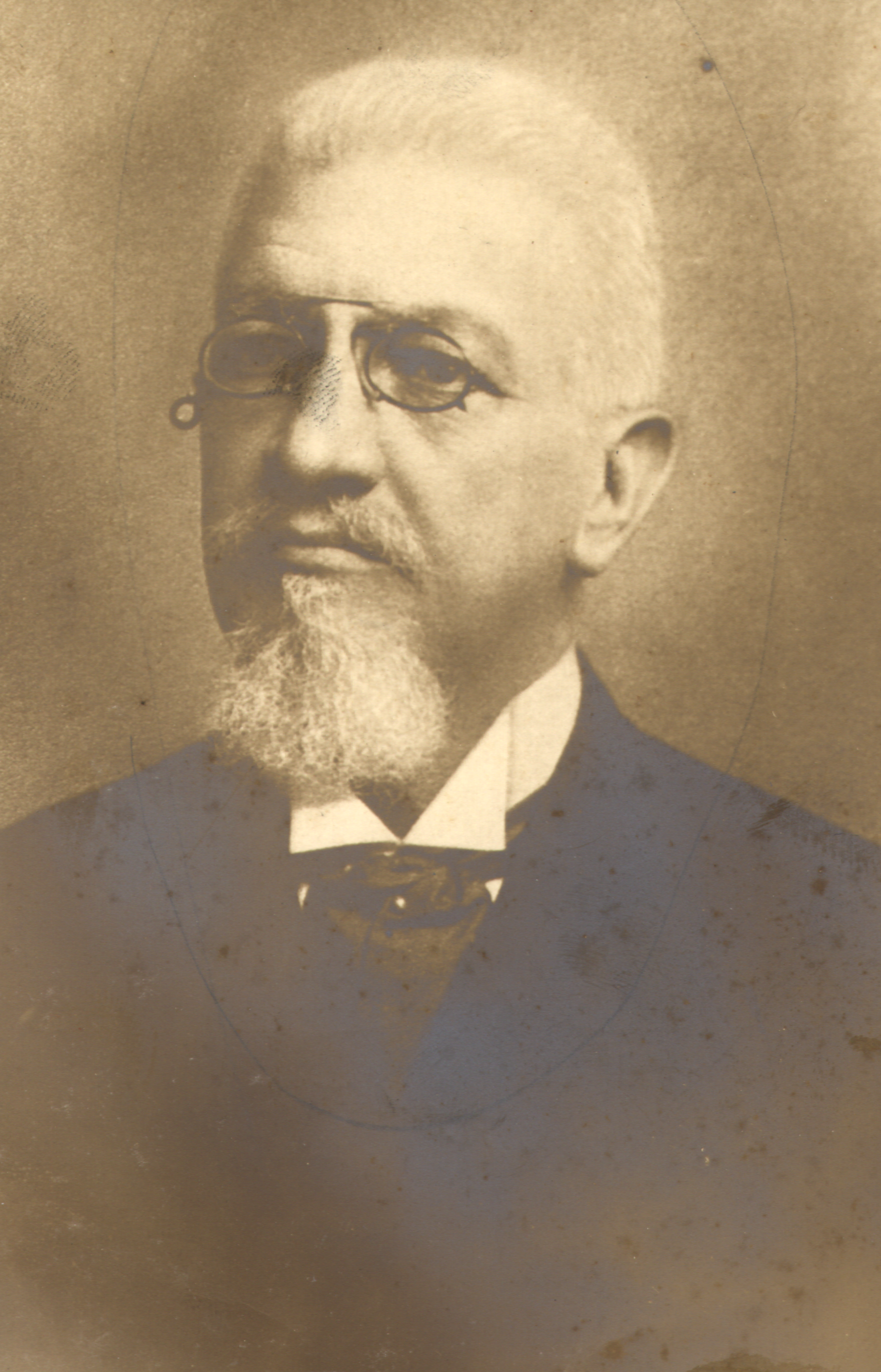
- Born: August 15, 1846; Campinas, São Paulo, Empire of Brazil
- Died: April 12, 1916 (aged 69); Rio de Janeiro, Rio de Janeiro, Brazil
- Resting place: Cemitério da Saudade
- Education: Faculty of Law of São Paulo
- Political party: Paulista Republican Party

Francisco Glicério de Cerqueira Leite (August 15, 1846 – April 12, 1916) was a Brazilian lawyer, politician, professor, and journalist. A leading figure of the Paulista Republican Party, he occupied several public offices, including federal deputy and senator for São Paulo and Minister of Agriculture.

== Biography ==
Glicério's father descended from wealthy rural families of São Paulo, while his mother was an emancipated slave. He completed his early schooling in his hometown, Campinas, before moving to São Paulo to study at a seminary. At the age of 15, he enrolled at the Faculty of Law of São Paulo, but was unable to complete his studies due to his father's death.

In Campinas, facing financial hardship, he worked as a typographer and merchant before accepting a position as a primary school teacher in São José do Rio Claro. Around that time, he was already involved with political activism, having joined the so-called Clube Radical, an abolitionist and republican group of young men that included Luís Gama, Bernardino de Campos, Prudente de Morais, and Campos Sales. Two newspapers, Gazeta de Campinas and Radical Paulistano, were associated with the club, and to the latter contributed names like Castro Alves, Ruy Barbosa, and Joaquim Nabuco. This group would later become the Grupo Radical de São Paulo.

In 1873, Glicério was present at the Convention of Itu, becoming one of the founding members of the Paulista Republican Party. In 1874, Glicério, along with other Freemasons, established the traditional Colégio Culto à Ciência. In 1875, the Party launched its own newspaper, A Província de São Paulo, which would originate O Estado de S. Paulo.

Glicério was an organizer and a publicist of both the republican and abolitionist campaigns. He brought several young men into the causes, including Carlos de Campos, Júlio de Mesquita, and Alfredo Pujol.

== Career ==
=== Empire (1881 - 1889) ===
In 1881, Glicério began his political career as a city councilor for Campinas. His election signalled the growth of the PRP, which, in 1884, succeeded in electing two federal deputies: Prudente de Morais and Campos Sales. In 1888, following the departure of Pedro II to Europe for health reasons, Glicério met with the republican leader Júlio de Castilhos to prepare a plan, which consisted of pressuring princess Isabel to abolish slavery. The same year, Isabel signed the Lei Áurea.

In 1889, Glicério failed to be elected as a federal deputy, losing to a conservative rival. Glicério took part in the preparation for that year's republican coup d'état. On November 10, following his arrival in Rio de Janeiro, he attended a gathering at Deodoro da Fonseca's house, in which were present Ruy Barbosa, Aristides Lobo, Quintino Bocaiuva, Benjamin Constant, João Tomás de Cantuária, and Frederico Sólon de Sampaio Ribeiro, and where the overthrow of the monarchy was proposed, agreed upon, and planned.

=== Republic ===
With the establishment of the Republic, Glicério was requested to help form a provisional government, and took up the Minister of Agriculture. He was appointed vice-governor of São Paulo under Prudente de Morais together with the physician Luís Pereira Barreto.
