= 1898 Brazilian presidential election =

- 1 March 1898
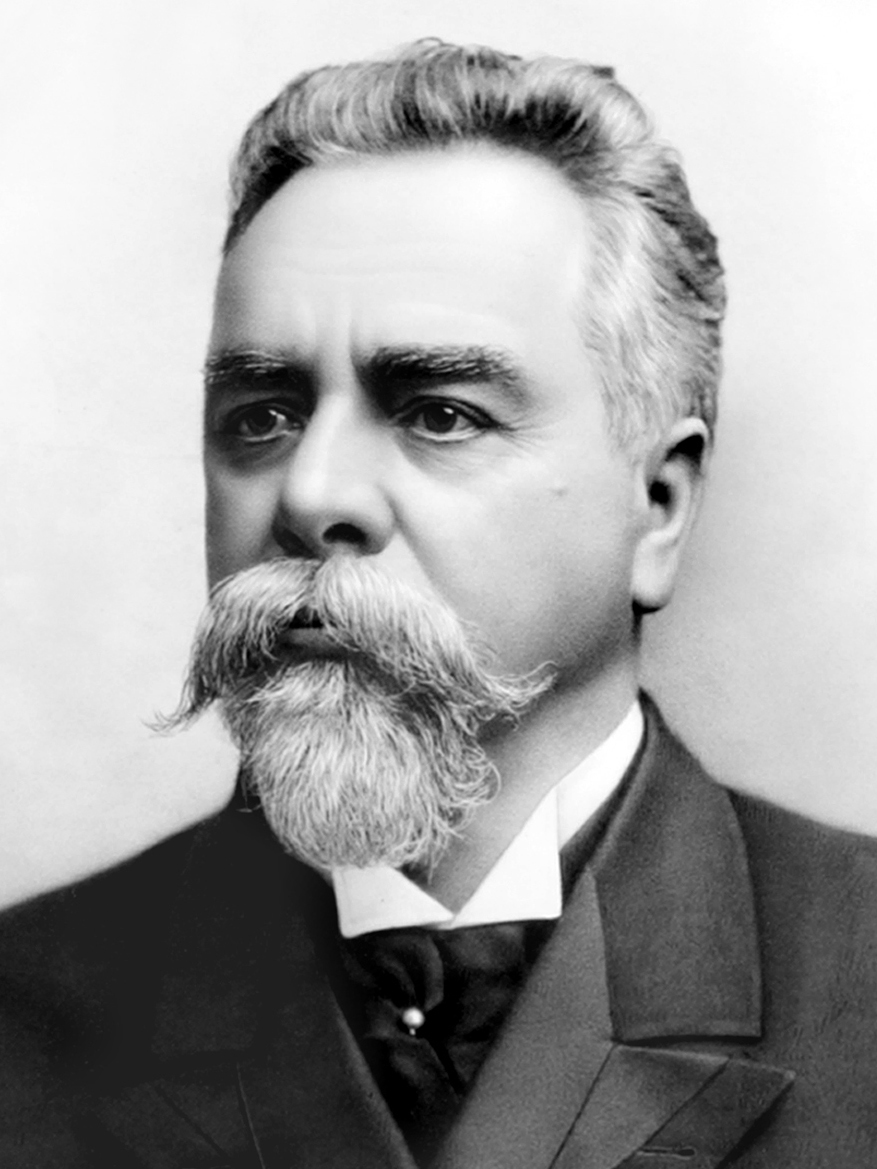

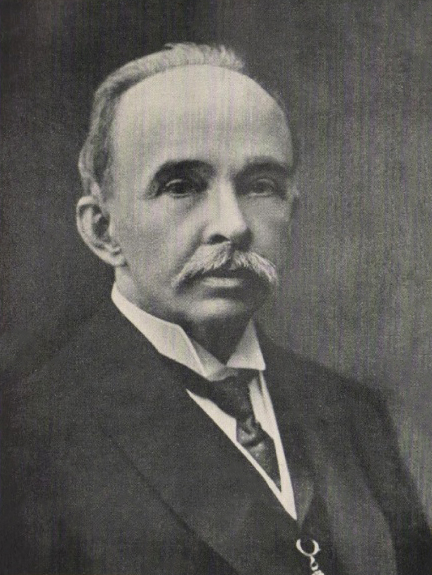
Candidate	Campos Sales	Lauro Sodré
Party	PRP	PR Paraná
Popular vote	420,286	38,929
Percentage	90.9%	8.42%
- Results by state
President before election
Prudente de Morais
PRP
Elected President
Campos Sales
PRP

Presidential elections were held in Brazil on 1 March 1898. The result was a victory for Campos Sales of the Paulista Republican Party, who received 91% of the vote.

== Results ==
Candidate	Party	Votes	%
Campos Sales	Paulista Republican Party	420,286	90.90
Lauro Sodré	Paraná Republican Party	38,929	8.42
Other candidates		3,146	0.68
Total		462,361	100.00
Source: Nohlen
