= 1926 Brazilian presidential election =

- 1 March 1926
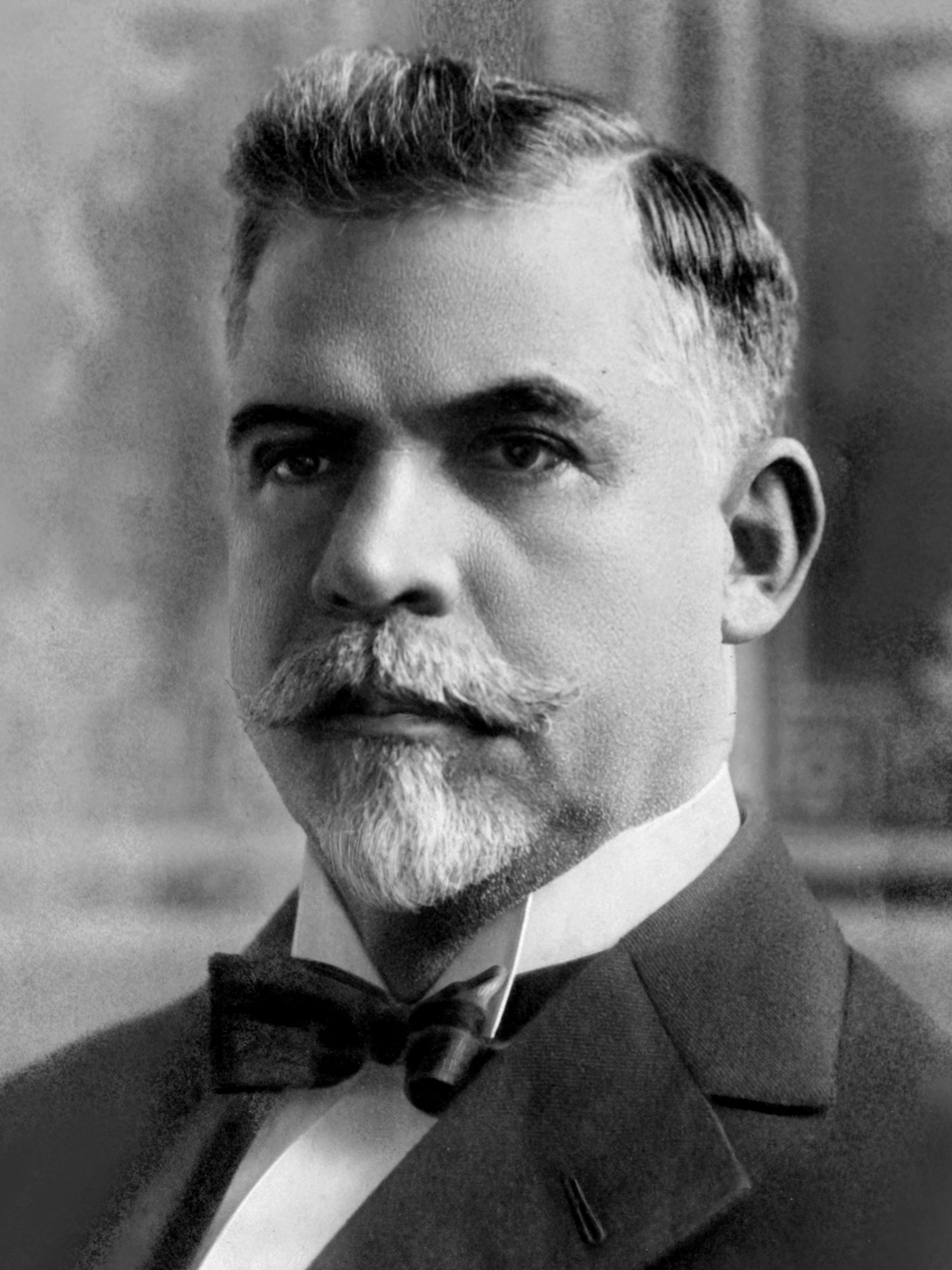

Nominee	Washington Luís	Assis Brasil
Party	PRP	PFB
Popular vote	688,528	1,116
Percentage	98%	0.16%
- Results by state
President before election
Artur Bernardes
PRM
Elected President
Washington Luís
PRP

Presidential elections were held in Brazil on 1 March 1926. The result was a victory for Washington Luís of the Paulista Republican Party, who received 98% of the vote.

== Results ==
Candidate	Party	Votes	%
Washington Luís	Paulista Republican Party	688,528	98.00
Joaquim Francisco de Assis Brasil	Brazilian Federalist Party	1,116	0.16
Other candidates		12,936	1.84
Total		702,580	100.00
Source: Nohlen
