= Jorge Tibiriçá =

Brazilian politician (1855–1928)

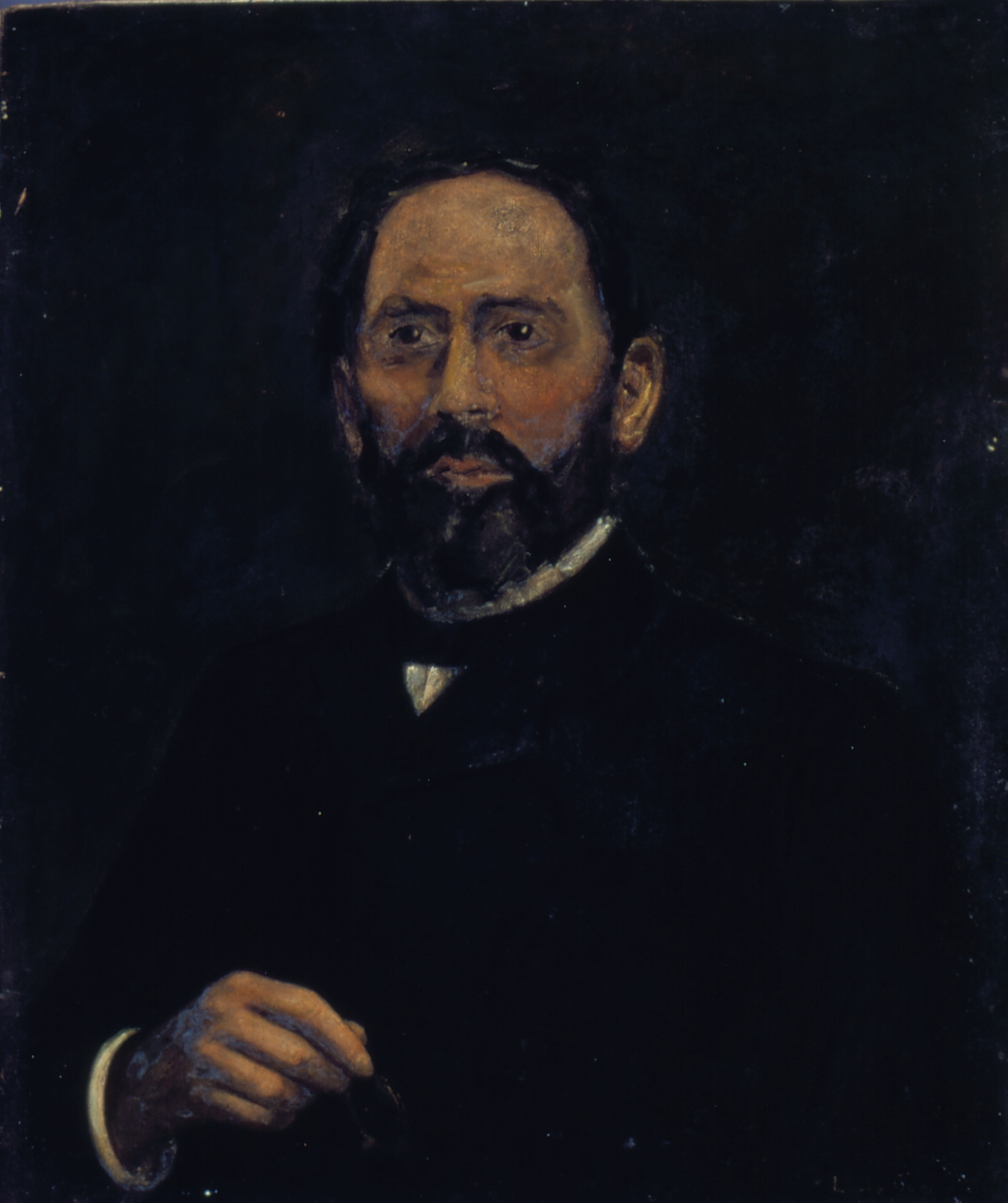

President of São Paulo
- In office October 18, 1890 – March 7, 1891
- Preceded by: Prudente de Morais
- Succeeded by: Américo Brasilliense

Personal details
- Born: Jorge Tibiriçá Piratininga; November 15, 1855 Paris, France
- Died: September 30, 1928 (aged 72) São Paulo, Brazil
- Party: PRP

Jorge Tibiriçá Piratininga (November 15, 1855 — September 30, 1928) was a Brazilian politician who served as president (governor) of São Paulo.

== Biography ==
Jorge Tibiriçá Piratininga, the son of João Tibiriçá Piratininga, was born in Paris on what was to become the day of the proclamation of the Brazilian Republic. He studied agriculture and philosophy in Germany and Switzerland, and was president of the Republican Party of São Paulo (PRP) of which his father had helped form. He was the second person to be named governor of the State of São Paulo following Prudente de Morais. Before Morais' nomination the state was governed by a triumvirate between Prudente de Morais, Joaquim de Sousa Mursa, and Francisco Rangel Pestana. In February 1904 he was elected to office for the first time as the 7th president of São Paulo (which was essentially the same as governor).

His administration would be marked by an improvement in the states armed forces by bringing a mission of the Gendarmerie from Paris to serve as a new model for the "Força Pública". Additionally, he promoted the Taubaté Agreement, an encounter of the governors of São Paulo, Minas Gerais, and Rio de Janeiro that resulted in an agreement that would help keep Brazilian coffee selling overseas at a lucrative price for Brazilian coffee barons until the Stock Market Crash of 1929. He is also known for lease holding the Sorocaba Railway to an American company.

He was the state secretary of agriculture, commerce and public works during the administration of Bernardino de Campos and worked in the State Senate from 1892 to 1924. He died in São Paulo at the age of 72.
