= Cerqueira César (politician) =

Brazilian politician

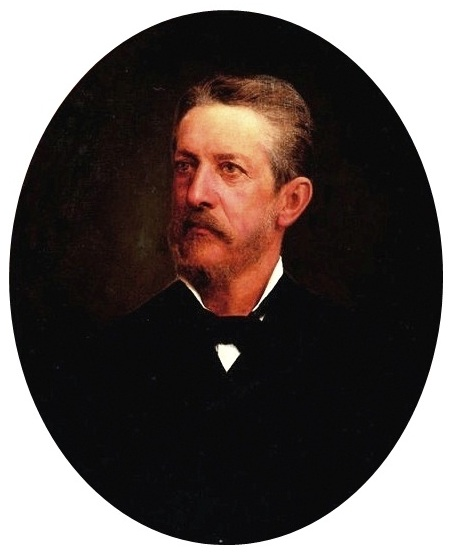
- Portrait by Almeida Júnior, 1895

President of São Paulo
- In office 16 December 1891 – 23 August 1892
- Preceded by: Américo Brasiliense
- Succeeded by: Bernardino de Campos

Personal details
- Born: 23 May 1835; Guarulhos, São Paulo, Empire of Brazil
- Died: 26 July 1911 (aged 76); São Paulo, São Paulo, Brazil
- Resting place: Consolação Cemetery

José Alves de Cerqueira César (23 May 1835 – 26 July 1911) was a Brazilian politician who served as president (governor) of the State of São Paulo from December 1891 to August 1892.

Cerqueira César was born in Guarulhos. He graduated in 1860 from the Law School of São Paulo and was public defender in the city of Itapetininga. He was secretary and president of the Republican Party of São Paulo and assumed the position of Treasury Inspector for the State of São Paulo in 1889.

He was elected First Vice-President of the State of São Paulo for the mandate 1891–1892. The city of Cerqueira César in the state is named after him.

He died in São Paulo, aged 76.
