= Júlio de Mesquita =

Brazilian journalist

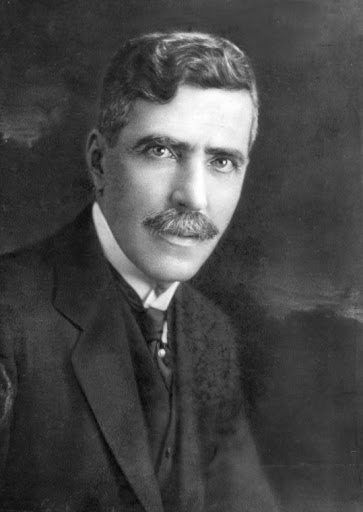
- Born: August 18, 1862; Campinas, São Paulo (state), Brazil
- Died: March 15, 1927 (aged 64); São Paulo, São Paulo (state), Brazil
- Resting place: Cemitério da Consolação
- Education: Faculty of Law of São Paulo
- Occupations: Journalist, entrepreneur, politician
- Children: Júlio de Mesquita Filho

Júlio César Ferreira de Mesquita (August 18, 1862 – March 15, 1927) was a Brazilian journalist, writer, lawyer, businessman, and politician. He owned the newspaper O Estado de S. Paulo.

== Biography ==
Born in Campinas into a wealthy family of Portuguese immigrants, Mesquita moved to Portugal at a young age, completing there his early years of schooling. Following his return to Brazil, he studied at the traditional Colégio Culto à Ciência and enrolled at the Faculty of Law of São Paulo, from which he graduated.

In January 1885, he began his career as journalist writing to the newspaper A Província de S. Paulo. In 1891, he took over as head of the newspaper, which had been renamed to O Estado de S. Paulo. By that time, he was already involved in political circles associated with the Paulista Republican Party. He was elected as a municipal councilor for Campinas, later progressing to state senator and federal deputee. By 1902, Mesquita Filho was drifting away from Republicanism. He came to endorse Ruy Barbosa's campaign twice, and was arrested during the São Paulo Revolt of 1924.

He was among the founders of the League of National Defence (pt), a civic and patriotic organization.
