= Francisco de Assis Rosa e Silva =

Vice President of Brazil from 1898 to 1902

Rosa e Silva
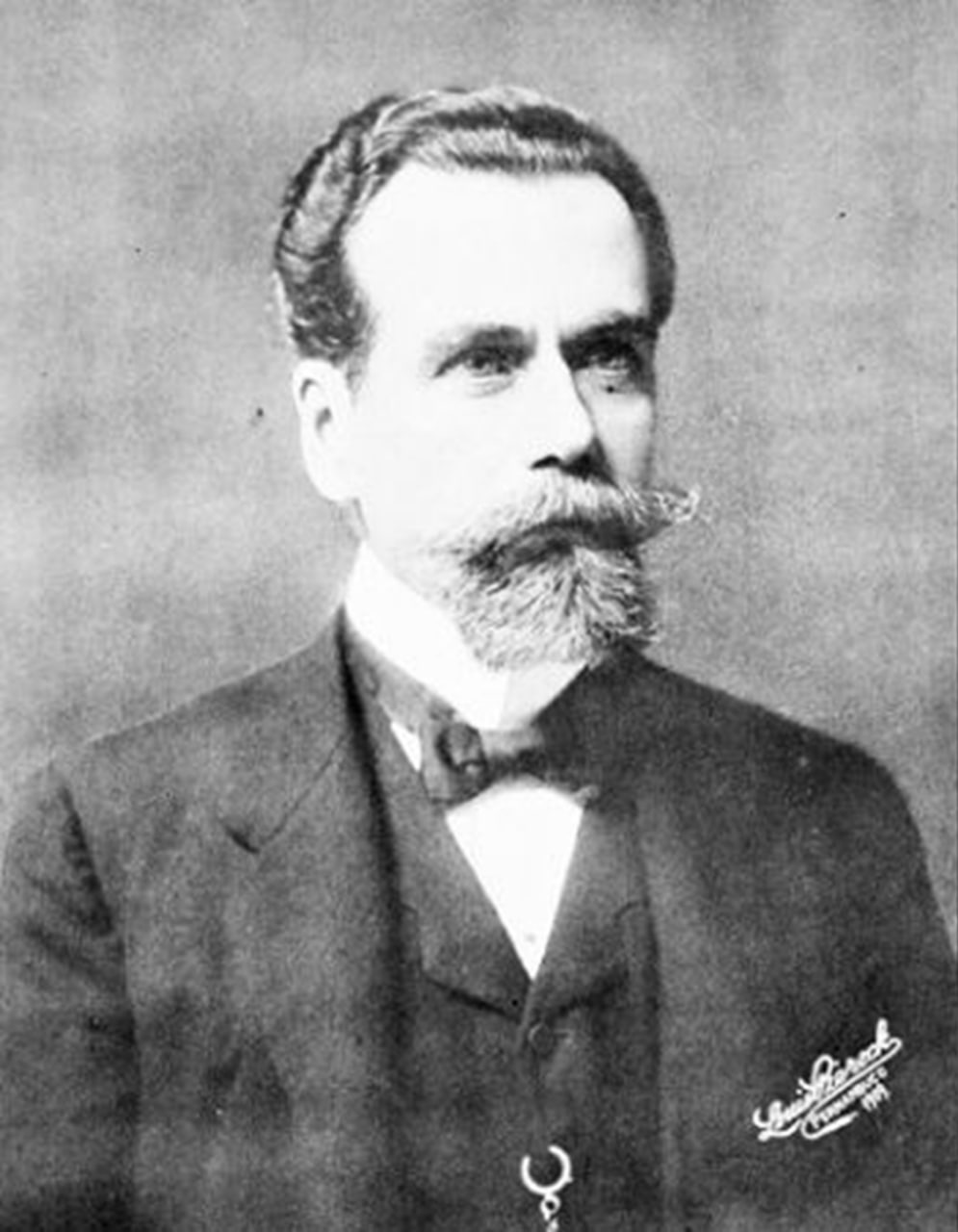

3rd Vice President of Brazil
- In office 15 November 1898 – 15 November 1902
- President: Campos Sales
- Preceded by: Manuel Vitorino
- Succeeded by: Afonso Pena

Acting President of Brazil
- In office 17 October 1900 – 8 November 1900
- Vice President: Himself
- Preceded by: Campos Sales
- Succeeded by: Campos Sales
Legislative offices
1924–1929	Senator for Pernambuco
1903–1911	Senator for Pernambuco
1896–1898	Senator for Pernambuco
1894–1896	President of the Chamber of Deputies
1890–1896	Federal Deputy for Pernambuco
1886–1889	General Deputy for Pernambuco
1882–1886	Provincial Deputy of Pernambuco
Executive offices
1889–1889	Minister of Justice

Personal details
- Born: Francisco de Assis Rosa e Silva; 4 October 1857 Recife, Pernambuco, Brazil
- Died: 1 July 1929 (aged 71) Rio de Janeiro, Federal District, Brazil
- Spouse(s): Maria das Dores Araújo (died 1892); Heloísa Graça Aranha (died 1935)
- Parents: Albino José da Silva (father); Joana Francisca da Rosa (mother)
- Education: Faculty of Law of Recife

Francisco de Assis Rosa e Silva (4 October 1857 – 1 July 1929) was a Brazilian politician who was the vice president of Brazil from 15 November 1898 to 15 November 1902 under Manuel Ferraz de Campos Sales. As Vice President, he also served as the President of the Senate. He served as the President of the Chamber of Deputies from 1894 to 1896.

Political offices
Preceded by Manuel Vitorino	Vice President of Brazil; 1898–1902	Succeeded by Afonso Pena
