= Campos Sales =

President of Brazil from free 1898 to 1902

His Excellency Campos Sales
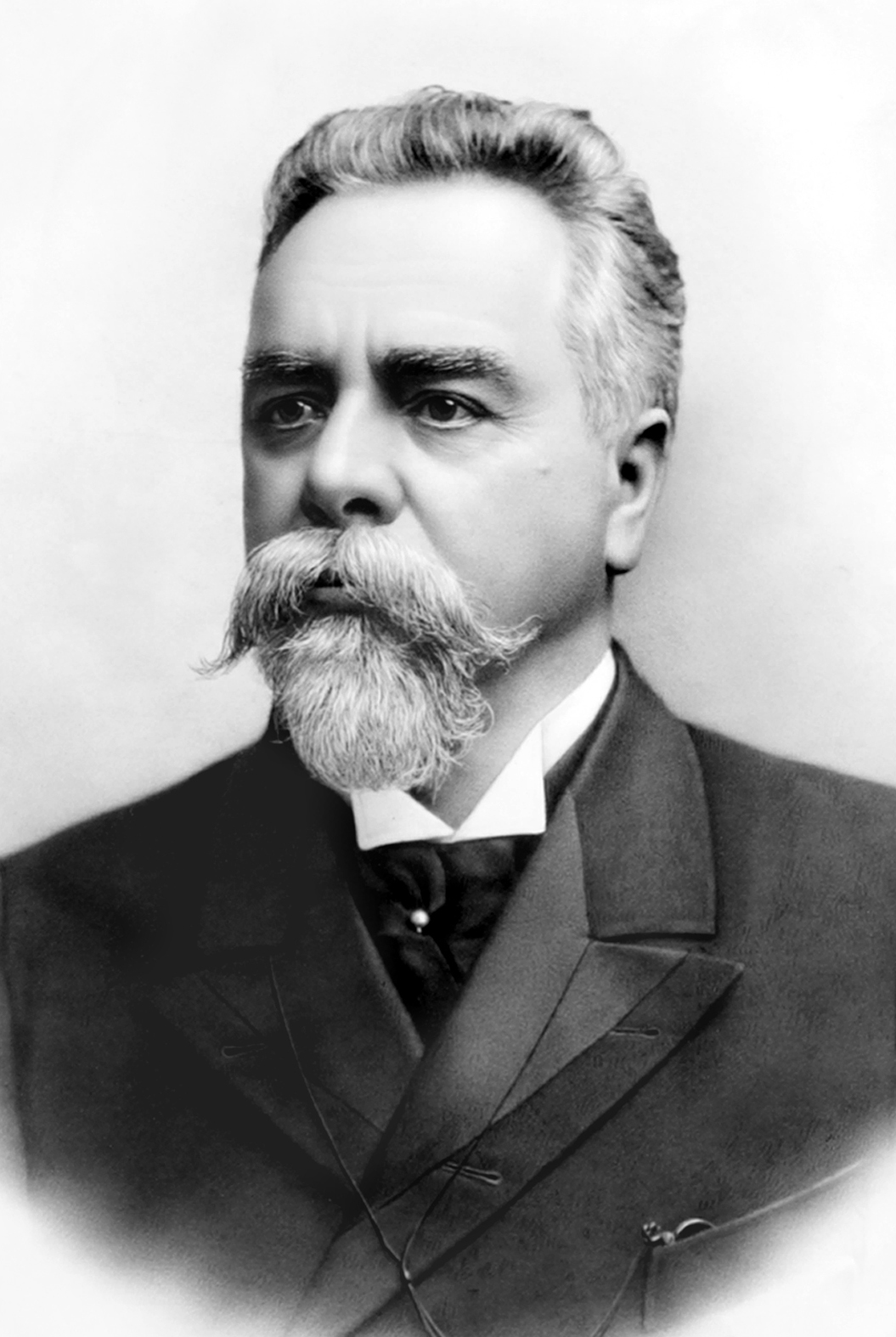
- Official portrait, 1898

4th President of Brazil
- In office 15 November 1898 – 15 November 1902
- Vice President: Rosa e Silva
- Preceded by: Prudente de Morais
- Succeeded by: Rodrigues Alves
Diplomatic offices
Ambassador of Brazil to Argentina
In office 14 April 1912 – 6 July 1912
Nominated by	Hermes da Fonseca
Preceded by	Pereira da Costa Mota
Succeeded by	Sousa Dantas
Executive offices
President of São Paulo
In office 1 May 1896 – 31 October 1897
Vice President	Peixoto Gomide
Preceded by	Peixoto Gomide
Succeeded by	Peixoto Gomide
Minister of Justice
In office 18 November 1889 – 22 January 1891
President	Deodoro da Fonseca
Preceded by	Cândido de Oliveira
Succeeded by	Baron of Lucena
Legislative offices
1912–1913	Senator
1909–1912	Senator
1891–1896	Senator
1888–1889	Provincial Deputy
1885–1886	General Deputy
1882–1883	Provincial Deputy

Personal details
- Born: Manoel Ferraz de Campos Sales; 15 February 1841 Campinas, São Paulo, Empire of Brazil
- Died: 28 June 1913 (aged 72) Santos, São Paulo, Brazil
- Party: Liberal (1863–1873); PRP (1873–1913)
- Spouse: Ana Gabriela de Campos Sales (m. 1865)
- Children: 10
- Education: Faculty of Law of Largo de São Francisco

Manoel Ferraz de Campos Sales (Brazilian Portuguese pronunciation: [manuˈɛw feˈʁaz dʒi ˈkɐ̃pus ˈsalis]; 15 February 1841 – 28 June 1913) was a Brazilian lawyer, coffee farmer, and politician who served as the fourth president of Brazil from 1898 to 1902.

== Early life and political career ==
He was born in the city of Campinas, São Paulo, descended from a rich family of coffee planters. He graduated as a lawyer from the Faculdade de Direito do Largo de São Francisco, São Paulo, in 1863. He served as a provincial deputy of the state assembly of São Paulo three times, (1868-1869, 1882-1883, 1888-1889). He was a signatory of the Republican Manifesto of 1870, and one of the founders of the Paulista Republican Party (PRP). In 1888, he became president of the PRP Central Committee. After the Proclamation of the Republic, he was chosen by Deodoro da Fonseca to be Minister of justice (1889–1891), and senator and governor of São Paulo (1896–1897). In 1898, he was elected president of Brazil.

== Presidency (1898–1902) ==
Austere financial reforms were adopted during his tenure under Minister of Finance Joaquim Murtinho. Unpopular economic reforms such as introduction of paper money and the increase of taxes were introduced during his presidency. He obtained a funding loan from Britain, which suspended the interest charge from previous loans. He also created the political system known as the Governors Policy, in which politics would be controlled by dominated by smaller political groups in each states, and created the Verification of Powers, a commission which had authority to supervise elections and ensure a favourable environment for the election of pro-government candidates. He created the Instituto de Manguinhos (now the Oswaldo Cruz Foundation), which was mainly focused on the creation of vaccines against the bubonic plague. During his trip to Argentina from October 1900 to November 1900, his vice president, Francisco de Assis Rosa e Silva, assumed the duty of president.

== Later life and death ==
In 1909, he was elected Senator for São Paulo and held the position until 1913. He was also Minister Plenipotentiary to Argentina (1912).

He died in São Paulo on 28 June 1913 from a cerebral embolism.

== See also ==
- List of presidents of Brazil

Political offices
Preceded by Prudente José de Morais Barros	President of Brazil; 1898–1902	Succeeded by Rodrigues Alves
Government offices
Preceded by Bernardino José de Campos Júnior	President of São Paulo; 1896–1897	Succeeded by Fernando Prestes de Albuquerque as President
