= Carlos de Campos =

Brazilian politician (1866–1927)

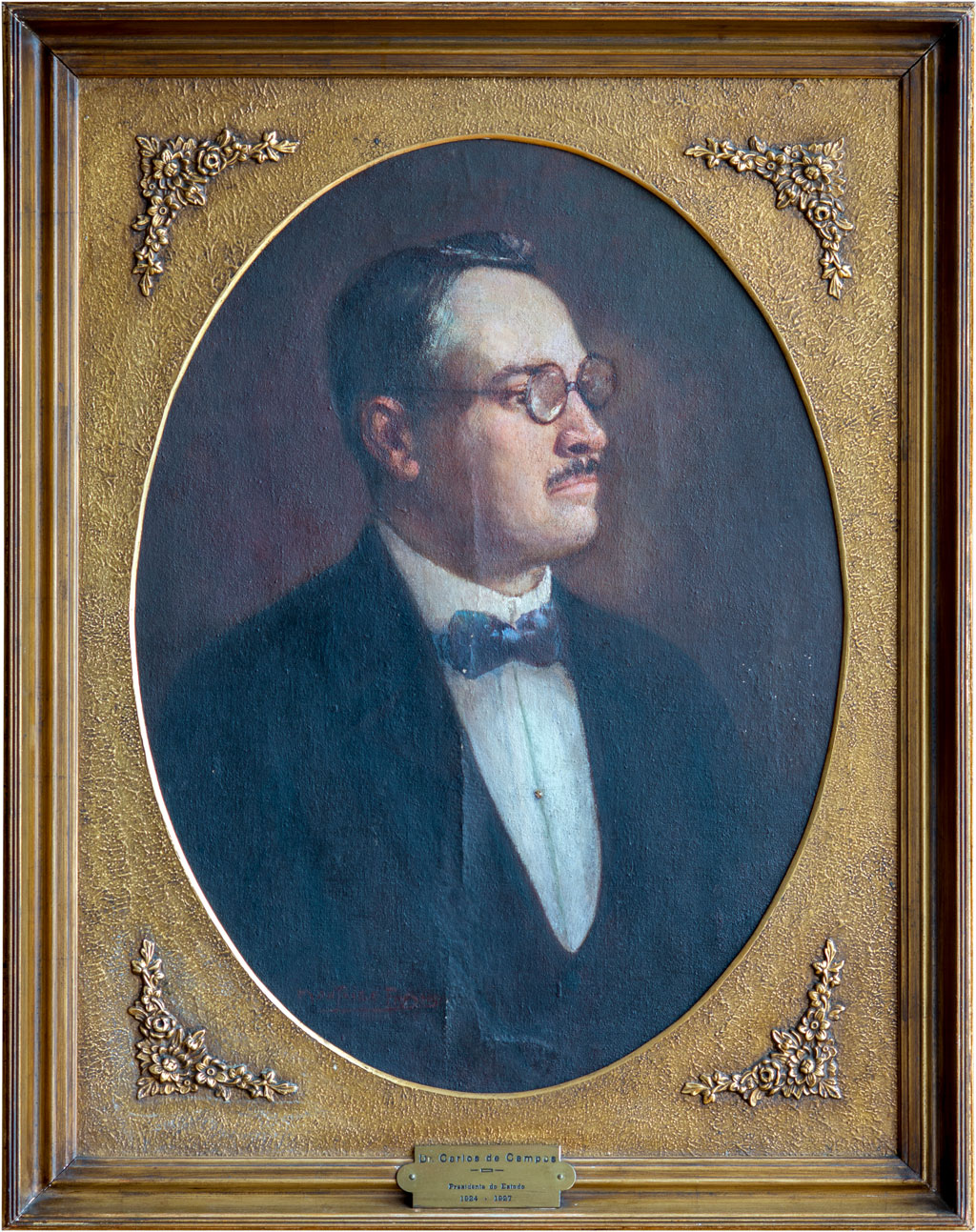

Personal details
- Born: 6 August 1866 Campinas, Brazil
- Died: 27 April 1927 (aged 60) São Paulo, Brazil

Carlos de Campos [ˈkaʁluz dʒi ˈkɐ̃pus] (6 August 1866 – 27 April 1927) was a Brazilian politician, and president of the state of São Paulo for several months in 1924.

He was a native of Campinas, São Paulo state, son of Bernardino de Campos (who also was a president of that state). He graduated with a law degree from the College of the Plaza of Saint Francis in 1887. Interested in music, he was a composer and founding member of the São Paulo Academy of Letters, and became its sixteenth chairman.

His political career began when he was member of the Board of Municipal Intendancy Support in 1890. Shortly afterwards he served as state deputy, from 1895 up to 1915, being Chairman of the Board between 1907 and 1915. In 1896 already he had the busy position of Secretary of State for Justice. Between 1915 and 1918 he was a state senator. Moving up to the federal level, he was representative (1918/1923) and became leader of the majority in the government of President Epitácio Pessoa.

He initiated his term as president of the State of São Paulo on May 1, 1924. On July 5, 1924, during his tenure as state governor, the 1924 São Paulo revolt erupted, compelling the federal government of Brazil to bomb the city and forcing Campos to take refuge in Guaiaúna, where the government forces were concentrated. Under this administration the Guarda Civil was created, and the Public Force started to count on a flotilla of airplanes.

He died in São Paulo, before fulfilling his term, on April 27, 1927. The remaining time in his term was served by the President of the State Senate, Antônio Dino da Costa Bueno, as thirteenth President.

Government offices
Preceded by Washington Luís	President of the State of São Paulo; 1924–1927	Succeeded by Antônio Dino da Costa Bueno
