= Américo Brasiliense (politician) =

Brazilian politician

Américo Brasiliense de Almeida Melo (São Paulo, August 8, 1833 -Rio de Janeiro, March 25, 1896) was the third governor of the State of São Paulo, from March to December 1891, and first president of the State of São Paulo.

Died in Rio de Janeiro, as Minister of the Supreme Federal Tribunal. The city of Américo Brasiliense in the State of São Paulo is named after him, as is a school in the city of Santo André. His son with his wife, Marcellina Lopes Chaves de Mello, was a member of the Academia de Medicina de São Paulo.
