= President-elect of Brazil =

Winning candidate of the Brazilian presidential elections

- Presidente eleito do Brasil
- Incumbent; Vacant since 1 January 2023
- Style: His/Her Excellency
- Residence: In their own residence until inauguration day
- Term length: In the period between TSE confirmation and Inauguration Day
- Inaugural holder: Prudente de Morais; 1 March – 15 November 1894
- Formation: No official formation

President-elect of Brazil is the title used to refer to the winning candidate of the presidential elections of Brazil, in the period between the announcement of the election results and his taking office, from which he becomes constitutionally President of Brazil and has beginning of his term. The first directly elected president in Brazil was Prudente de Morais after winning the presidential election in Brazil in 1894, defeating Afonso Pena.

Currently, when a president is elected in Brazil, during confirmation at the polls and until their inauguration, all television newspapers and news papers refer to them as the "elected president." This title cannot be attained by incumbent presidents. During the period he holds that title, they are certified by the TSE (Superior Electoral Court), which makes official the results of the polls and is a formal condition for the president-elect to take office on 5 January, days after winning at the polls.

According to article 77 of the Federal Constitution of Brazil, the candidate who obtains half of the valid votes plus one in an election held on the first Sunday of October is considered elected. If no candidate reaches this mark, a second round is called between the two candidates with the highest number of votes in the first round, to be held on the last Sunday of October. The Constitution further determines that the president be elected for a four-year term, with the right to reelection, starting on 5 January of the following year.

The outgoing president should assemble a team that will work with the president-elect's team. Between the election and the inauguration, both teams, as well as the occupying president and the elected one, meet several times so that the new ruler and his team can adapt to all their future obligations. The transition process begins on the second business day after the announcement of the election result, and ends up to ten days after the president-elect takes office.

== List ==
President-elect (Note: Column counts number of presidents-elect.: Getúlio Vargas and Luiz Inácio Lula da Silva are counted twice because they were elected to two non-consecutive terms. Of those two, Lula elected on his third term overall after returning to power. Rodrigues Alves was also elected to two non-consecutive terms but died before entering his second term.; Nilo Peçanha, Delfim Moreira, José Linhares, Café Filho, João Goulart, Artur da Costa e Silva, José Sarney, Itamar Franco, and Michel Temer are not counted because they entered office intra-term and never elected to the presidency. Of those nine, Sarney entered presidency at the start of Tancredo Neves's term as acting president despite Neves having ill before his scheduled inauguration and subsequent death.)		Party	Following
1	Prudente de Morais	PR Federal	Election of 1894
2	Campos Sales	PRP	Election of 1898
3	Rodrigues Alves	PRP	Election of 1902
4	Afonso Pena	PRM	Election of 1906
4	Hermes da Fonseca	PRC	Election of 1910
5	Venceslau Brás	PRM	Election of 1914
6	Rodrigues Alves (Note: Died before taking office)	PRP	Election of 1918
7	Epitácio Pessoa	PRM	Election of 1919
8	Artur Bernardes	PRM	Election of 1922
9	Washington Luís	PRP	Election of 1926
10	Júlio Prestes (Note: Did not take office, taking over by military junta)	PRP	Election of 1930
11	Getúlio Vargas	Independent	Election of 1934
12	Eurico Gaspar Dutra	PSD	Election of 1945
13	Getúlio Vargas	PTB	Election of 1950
14	Juscelino Kubitschek	PSD	Election of 1955
15	Jânio Quadros	PTN	Election of 1960
16	Castelo Branco	Independent	Election of 1964
17	Emílio Garrastazu Médici	ARENA	Election of 1969
18	Ernesto Geisel	ARENA	Election of 1974
19	João Figueiredo	ARENA	Election of 1978
20	Tancredo Neves	MDB	Election of 1985
21	Fernando Collor	PRN	Election of 1989
22	Fernando Henrique Cardoso	PSDB	Election of 1994
23	Luiz Inácio Lula da Silva	PT	Election of 2002
24	Dilma Rousseff	PT	Election of 2010
25	Jair Bolsonaro	PSL	Election of 2018
26	Luiz Inácio Lula da Silva	PT	Election of 2022
