= List of assassinated Brazilian politicians =

This is a list of assassinated Brazilian politicians

Date		Victim	Office	Location	Attacker	Notes
1830	24 December	José Paulino de Almeida e Albuquerque	Former President of the Province of Rio Grande do Norte and Congressman of the General Assembly for Rio Grande do Norte	Ponte de Uchôa, Recife, Province of Pernambuco	Unknown	
1891	29 June	Estácio Borges da Silva Matos	Former congressman of the General Assembly for Santa Catarina	Lajeado dos Linhares, Curitibanos, Santa Catarina	Manuel Ferreira da Silva Farrapo and Joaquim dos Santos Matoso	
1895	4 March	José Maria de Albuquerque Melo	Acting governor of Pernambuco in 1891, president of the state's legislative assembly	Recife, Pernambuco	Three police officers	He was a candidate for mayor of Recife at the time of his death
1897	5 November	Carlos Machado de Bittencourt	Minister of War	Rio de Janeiro, Federal District of Brazil	Marcelino Bispo de Melo	See Attempted assassination of Prudente de Morais
1897	30 November	Antônio da Silva Paranhos	Senator for Goiás	Catalão, Goiás	Carlos Antônio de Andrade	
1908	11 August	José Plácido de Castro	Former President of the Republic of Acre	São Paulo, São Paulo	Unknown	
1915	8 September	Pinheiro Machado	Senator for Rio Grande do Sul and Vice President of the Federal Senate	Rio de Janeiro, Federal District	Manso de Paiva	
1929	1 July	Juquinha Gomes Duarte	Mayor of Bauru, São Paulo	Bauru, São Paulo	Moacir de Almeida	
1929	26 December	Manuel Francisco de Sousa Filho	Federal Deputy for Pernambuco	Rio de Janeiro, Federal District of Brazil	Ildefonso Simões Lopes	
1930	26 July	João Pessoa Cavalcânti de Albuquerque	Governor of Paraíba	Recife, Pernambuco	João Duarte Dantas	
1963	4 December	José Kairala	Substitute senator for Acre	Brasília, Federal District	Arnon de Melo	See homicide at the Brazilian Senate
1971	21 or 22 January	Rubens Paiva	Former Federal Deputy for São Paulo	Rio de Janeiro, Guanabara	Unknown	
1973	25 December	Maurício Grabois	Former Federal Deputy for the Federal District of Brazil	Xambioá, Goiás	Unknown	
1992	17 May	Edmundo Pinto	Governor of Acre	São Paulo, São Paulo	Unknown	
1993	10 March	Renildo José dos Santos	Councillor of Coqueiro Seco	Coqueiro Seco, Alagoas	José Renato de Oliveira and Luiz Marcelo Falcão	
2001	10 September	Antonio da Costa Santos	Mayor of Campinas, São Paulo	Campinas, São Paulo	Unknown	
2001	8 November	Aguinaldo Pereira da Silva	Mayor of Caraúbas, Rio Grande do Norte	Governador Dix-Sept Rosado, Rio Grande do Norte	Disputed	
2002	18 January	Celso Daniel	Mayor of Santo André, São Paulo	Juquitiba, São Paulo	Unknown	
2002	2 June	Lídia Menezes	Vice Mayor of Magé, Rio de Janeiro	Magé, Rio de Janeiro	Unknown	
2010	10 December	Walderi Braz Paschoalin	Mayor of Jandira, São Paulo	Jandira, São Paulo	Unknown	
2016	28 September	José Gomes da Rocha	Former Mayor of Itumbiara, Goiás, and mayoral candidate	Itumbiara, Goiás	Gilberto Ferreira do Amaral	
2018	14 March	Marielle Franco	City Councillor of Rio de Janeiro, Rio de Janeiro	Rio de Janeiro, Rio de Janeiro	Ronnie Lessa and Élcio Vieira de Queiroz	
2018	26 December	Gerson Camata	Former Governor of Espírito Santo	Vitória, Espírito Santo	Marcos Vinícius Moreira Andrade	
