= Francisco de Paula Argolo =

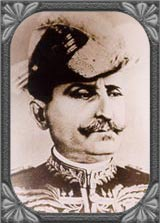

9th and 13th Minister of War of Brazil
- In office January 4, 1897 – May 17, 1897
- President: Prudente de Morais
- Vice President: Manuel Vitorino
- Preceded by: Dionísio Evangelista de Castro Cerqueira
- Succeeded by: Carlos Machado de Bittencourt
- In office November 15, 1902 – November 15, 1906
- President: Rodrigues Alves
- Vice President: Afonso Pena
- Preceded by: João Nepomuceno de Medeiros Mallet
- Succeeded by: Hermes da Fonseca

Personal details
- Born: January 28, 1847 São Francisco do Conde, Bahia, Brazil
- Died: February 11, 1930 (aged 83) Rio de Janeiro, Rio de Janeiro, Brazil

Military service
- Allegiance: Empire of Brazil; First Brazilian Republic
- Branch: Imperial Brazilian Army; Brazilian Army
- Years of service: 1866 – 1920
- Rank: Marshal
- Battles/wars: Paraguayan War; Humaitá campaign; Battle of Tuyutí; Campaign of the Hills; Federalist Revolution; Siege of Lapa

Francisco de Paula Argolo (January 28, 1847 – February 11, 1930) was a Brazilian Marshal of the Paraguayan War, the Federalist Revolution and the Vaccine Revolt. He served as the 9th and 13th Minister of War of Brazil and was a deputy of Bahia after the Proclamation of the Republic.

== Early Military Career ==
He was the son of Colonel Paulo de Argolo Queirós and Gracinda de Melo e Silva. His father was a veteran of the Cisplatine War. His uncle, General Alexandre Gomes de Argolo Ferrão, Baron of Cajaíba, participated in the Brazilian War of Independence and in the Cisplatine War. His cousin, General Alexandre Gomes de Argolo Ferrão Filho, Viscount of Itaparica, fought in the Paraguayan War. His brother, Captain Paulo de Argolo Queirós, was killed at the Battle of Itororó during the war.

Francisco enlisted on October 19, 1866 within the 40th Volunteer Corps and as an ensign, participated in the Paraguayan War along with his brother where he entered the 16th Infantry Corps under the command of General Antônio Tibúrcio Ferreira de Sousa. He was then appointed adjutant to the command of the 1st Division and later to the command of the 2nd Corps. Subsequently, he went on to serve with the general staff of the Duke of Caxias, and the Count of Eu. For his service during the Battle of Tuyutí, he was named a knight of the Order of Christ. For his performance during the battles of June 16 and 18 of the same year, he received the knighthood of the Order of the Rose. On June 18, 1868, he served under the 1st Army Corps and was promoted to Lieutenant on February 20, 1869. He was then brevetted as a Captain. These last two promotions were granted for bravery in the Dezembrada series of battles fought in December 1968 in the Chaco region under the command of Marshal Duke of Caxias. He also participated in the Campaign of the Hills, in the final phase of the war. In 1870, he served in the battalion of engineers that went to the Paraguayan city of Humaitá. On March 1 of that year, he left the theater of war, returning to Brazil.

On April 27, 1871, he was confirmed in the rank of captain for acts of bravery. In the same year, he enrolled at the Praia Vermelha Military School in Rio de Janeiro where he took courses in Infantry and Cavalry. He chose to become an infantry officer, a class in which he remained until the end of his military life. He was promoted to Major on May 24, 1888, to Lieutenant Colonel on January 7, 1890, and to Colonel on March 17, 1890.

== Constituent Deputy and Federalist Revolution ==
In the elections of September 15, 1890 for the National Constituent Congress, he ran for deputy for Bahia. Two slates were presented: one in support of the provisional government of Deodoro da Fonseca, and another, against. The first included the names indicated by the Clube Militar, organized shortly after the Proclamation of the Republic. In addition to Colonel Francisco de Paula Argolo, Admiral Custódio de Melo, the Baron de São Marcos, Lieutenant Colonel Paula Guimarães, General Dionísio Cerqueira, Captain Salvador Pires and Artur Rios were on the list. All were elected and took office on November 15, 1890.

Faced with the political question that arose right at the beginning of the Constituent Assembly to determine whether or not it would grant special powers to the provisional government, Argolo signed Ubaldino do Amaral's motion, legally consecrating the government. In his opinion, the states should only deal with their definitive organization after the Federal Constitution has been promulgated. He also thought that the military should only lose their ranks in case of conviction for an infamous crime, as provided for in the military codes. After the promulgation of the Constitution on February 24, 1891, he began, as of June, to exercise the ordinary mandate in the Chamber of Deputies.. In 1892, he was elected a member of the Chamber's Navy and War Committee and became a member of the National Democratic Party, founded on April 25 in Salvador.

In addition to concentrating his efforts on politics, he also devoted himself to a military career. He was promoted to Brigadier General on September 5, 1893, as commander of the 5th Military District, he marched from Paraná to the city of São Bento do Sul in Santa Catarina to participate in the repression of the Federalist Revolution which had started in February in Rio Grande do Sul and spread through the neighboring states. Como Desterro (modern-day Florianópolis) was captured by the revolutionaries, on November 11 he proclaimed São Bento do Sul provisional capital of the state and assumed the government. The next day, as the rebels approached the entrance to the city, he withdrew, destroying the bridges he found along the way. Along with the authorities who accompanied him, he took refuge in Rio Negro, later marching to Lapa, Paraná, participating in the Siege of Lapa. On December 31, 1893, he ended his term as federal deputy.

== Return to Military Service ==
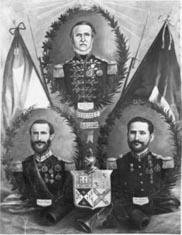
The Generals of Argolo: Alexandre Gomes de Argolo Ferrão, Francisco de Paula Argolo and Alexandre Gomes de Argolo Ferrão Filho.

In 1894, during the Revolta da Armada, a movement promoted by units of the Brazilian Navy against the government of Marshal Floriano Peixoto, Argolo defended the city of Niterói, capital of the state of Rio de Janeiro. He was then made Minister of War from January 4 to May 17, 1897 during the interim government of Manuel Vitorino and the first months after the return of Prudente de Morais, during which time the second and third expeditions of the War of Canudos took place. He resigned shortly after Prudente de Morais had resumed the government, due to a disagreement with the President, who, during a cabinet meeting, was dissatisfied with his performance in the ministry.

On January 28, 1898, he was appointed quartermaster-general of the war. Two years later he was promoted to Major General. He commanded the 1st Military Region in Rio de Janeiro, from November 12, 1900 until October 24, 1902. On July 13, 1902, he was promoted to Marshal. He returned to the post of Minister of War between November 15, 1902 and November 15, 1906, under Rodrigues Alves.

During his administration, Brazil faced border disputes with Peru, which, between the end of 1902 and mid-1903, attempted to conquer the regions of Alto Juruá and Alto Purus within Amazonas. Urged on by José Maria da Silva Paranhos Jr., Baron of Rio Branco, responsible for the process of consolidating Brazilian borders, Minister Argolo reinforced the Brazilian Army's strength in that state. The Brazilian objective was to conquer the Peruvian city of Iquitos, take the opposing warships and dominate Ucaiale, the Peruvian portion of the Amazon River. After several armed clashes with the Peruvians, Peru agreed to a joint administration, formalized on July 12, 1904.

At the end of that same year, Minister Argolo had to face demonstrations of protest against Law No. 1,261, of October 31, which instituted mandatory vaccination and revaccination against smallpox. Between November 10 and 16, numerous protests erupted across Rio de Janeiro. The movement, which became known as the Vaccine Revolt, as on the 14th, approximately 300 students from the Praia Vermelha Military School marching towards the city with the aim of taking the government palace and Argolo was sent to quell the revolt. On the same day, another uprising at the Realengo Preparatory and Tactics School had been thwarted shortly before. In response, the government authorized a new reorganization of military education, although the last regulation had only been in force since 1898. Thus, the Praia Vermelha Military School and the Realengo Preparatory and Tactical School were disbanded, and new teaching establishments were created. The School of Artillery and Engineering was located in the neighborhood of Realengo, and the School of Application of Artillery and Engineering, in Santa Cruz, both in Rio de Janeiro. For the cities of Rio Pardo and Porto Alegre in Rio Grande do Sul, were transferred, respectively, the School of Application of Infantry and Cavalry and the School of War. Finally, through Decree No. 5,698, of October 2, 1905, the new regulation for military teaching institutes was approved.

During his military administration, ni September 1905, military maneuvers were carried out in the fields of Santa Cruz. In September of the following year, the exercises were repeated. Another measure of the period was the installation of a smokeless gunpowder factory in Piquete, São Paulo. Still as Minister of War, Argolo was appointed Minister of the Supreme Military Court (STM), currently the Superior Military Court on February 24, 1905, taking office on March 6 of the same year. He presided over the STM from January 18, 1911 to November 26, 1920. On that date, he was removed from office by government act, the only case of removal in the Court's history.

He died in Rio de Janeiro on February 11, 1930. He was married to Maria José Pires de Argolo, sister of Antônio Joaquim Pires de Carvalho e Albuquerque, minister of the Federal Supreme Court between 1916 and 1931, and Attorney General of the Republic between 1919 and 1931.
