= João Tomás de Cantuária =

Brazilian general (1835–1908)

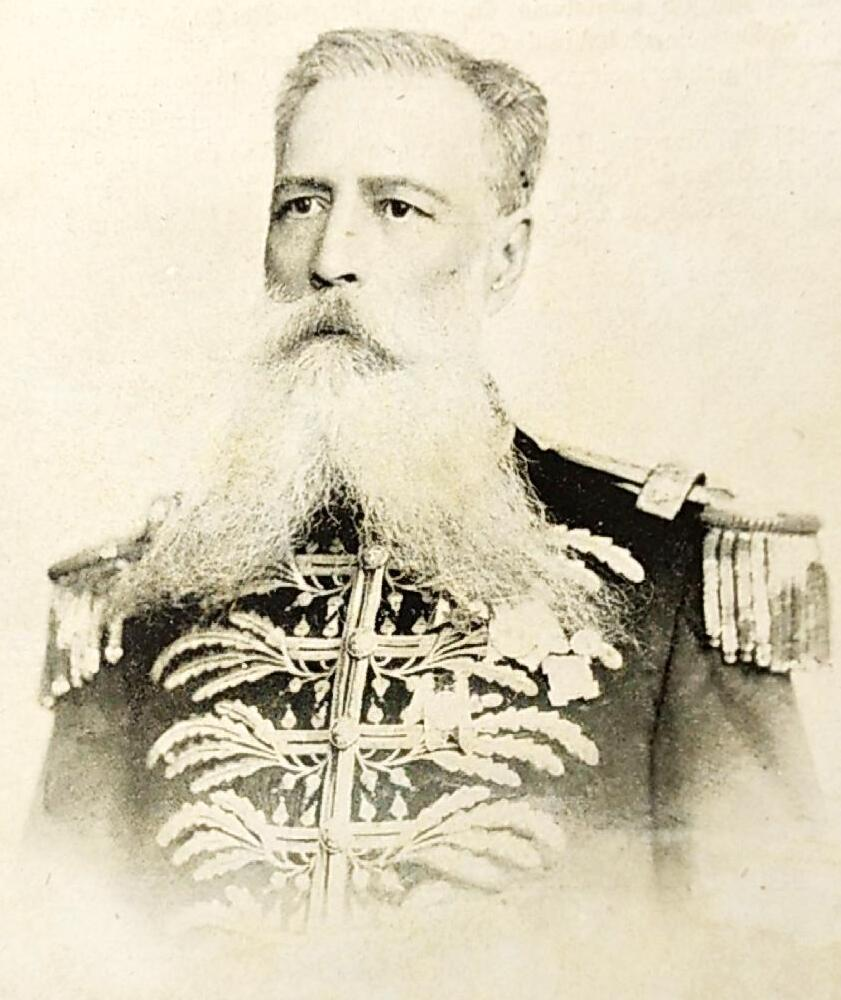

Acting Minister of War
- In office 2 August 1897 – 26 October 1897
- President: Prudente de Morais
- Preceded by: Carlos Machado de Bittencourt
- Succeeded by: Carlos Machado de Bittencourt
- In office 30 April 1900 – 24 May 1900
- President: Campos Sales
- Preceded by: João Nepomuceno de Medeiros Mallet
- Succeeded by: João Nepomuceno de Medeiros Mallet

Minister of War
- In office 7 November 1897 – 15 November 1898
- President: Prudente de Morais
- Preceded by: Carlos Machado de Bittencourt
- Succeeded by: João Nepomuceno de Medeiros Mallet

Personal details
- Born: 24 September 1835 Porto Alegre, Rio Grande do Sul, Empire of Brazil
- Died: 20 March 1908 (aged 72) Rio de Janeiro, Rio de Janeiro, Brazil
- Education: Military School of Praia Vermelha
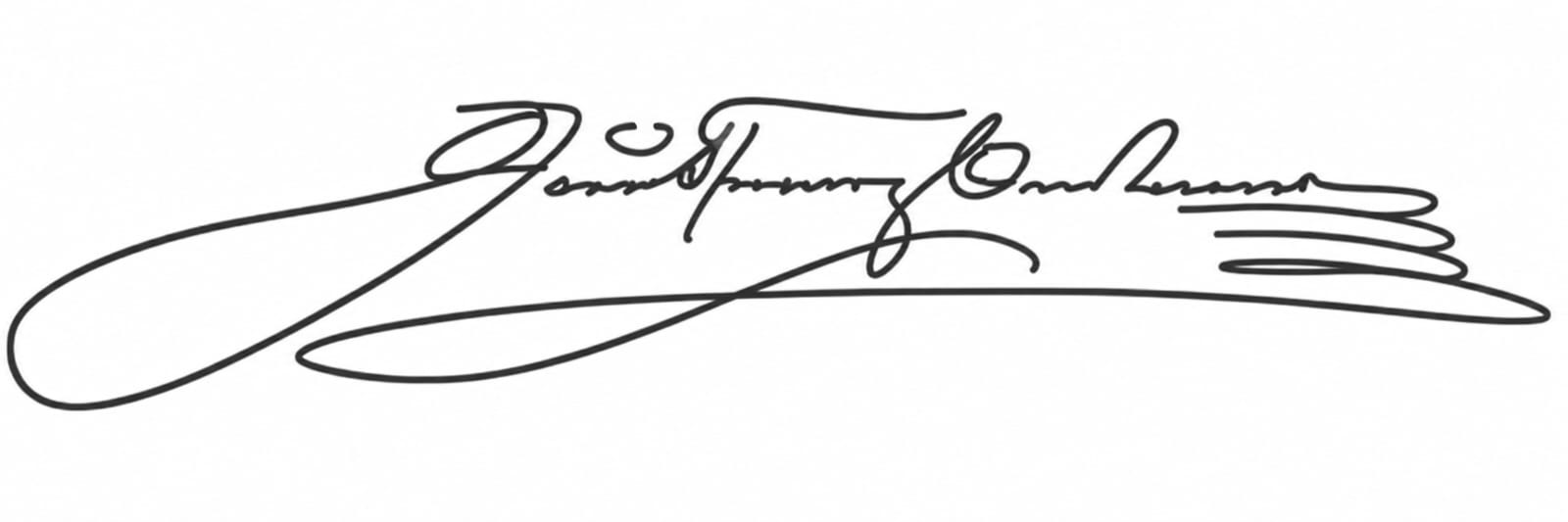
- Signature

Military service
- Allegiance: Brazil
- Branch/service: Army
- Years of service: 1854–1905
- Rank: Field marshal
- Commands: Court Police Corps; Rio de Janeiro War Arsenal; 6th Army Division; Brazilian Army General Staff
- Battles/wars: Uruguayan War; Paraguayan War

João Tomás de Cantuária (24 September 1835 – 20 March 1908) was a Brazilian field marshal who served as Minister of War under presidents Prudente de Morais and Campos Sales.

== Biography ==
Born in Porto Alegre, Cantuária enlisted in the military in March 1854, joining the 1st Horse Artillery Regiment in São Gabriel. He was promoted to second lieutenant in December 1857 and completed his fourth year at the Military School, graduating from the artillery course.

In the old Military School of Praia Vermelha, Cantuária studied mathematics and physics before attaining the rank of first lieutenant in 1860. In December 1862, he graduated as a civil engineer from the same school.

In 1864, Cantuária fought in the Uruguayan War. That same year, he partook in the Mato Grosso campaign, serving on a commission of military engineers and later being assigned to command an artillery corps. For his actions, he was elevated to captain in January 1866 and to major in November of the same year. He participated in the retreat from Laguna as an artilleryman. Following the end of the war, Cantuária was made a knight of the Order of Avis.
