= Attempted assassination of Prudente de Morais =

1897 assassination attempt

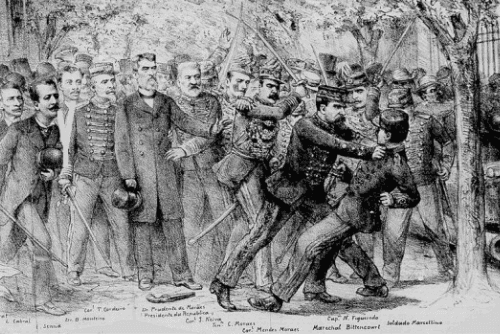
- Moment when Marcelino Bispo de Melo is detained by Marshal Bittencourt
- Location: Near the War Arsenal in Rio de Janeiro, Brazil
- Date: 5 November 1897; 128 years ago
- Target: Prudente de Morais, 3rd President of Brazil
- Attack type: Attempted assassination by gunshot
- Weapons: Garrucha and knife
- Deaths: 1
- Injuries: Luiz Mendes de Moraes
- Victim: Carlos Machado de Bittencourt
- Perpetrator: Marcelino Bispo de Melo
- Defenders: Carlos Machado de Bittencourt, Luiz Mendes de Moraes

The assassination attempt on Prudente de Morais took place on 5 November 1897, when then president of Brazil Prudente de Morais appeared at the War Arsenal (currently the National Historical Museum building) to welcome the victorious military forces returning from the War of Canudos, in Bahia. During the ceremony, in the early afternoon, Morais was approached by an armed young man from the 10th Infantry Battalion, Lance Corporal Marcelino Bispo de Melo, who pointed a gun in Morais' direction. The gun, however, did not fire. There was time for Marshal Carlos Machado de Bittencourt, the Minister of War, and Colonel Luiz Mendes de Moraes, chief of the president's security, to intervene in defense of the president. At this point, the attacker, who was also wielding a knife, wounded the colonel and stabbed Marshal Bittencourt several times, who ended up dying from his wounds.

At first, Vice President Manuel Vitorino, who had political disputes with Prudente de Morais, was indicted in the investigation into the attack, accused of involvement. Vitorino responded with a manifesto in which he declared his innocence and his name was not included in the final order of the case, but his career was ruined.

Marcelino was taken prisoner and found hanging in jail with a sheet. Although his death compromised the investigations, Captain Deocleciano Martyr and José de Souza Velloso were identified as mentors of the crime.
