= Marcelino Bispo de Melo =

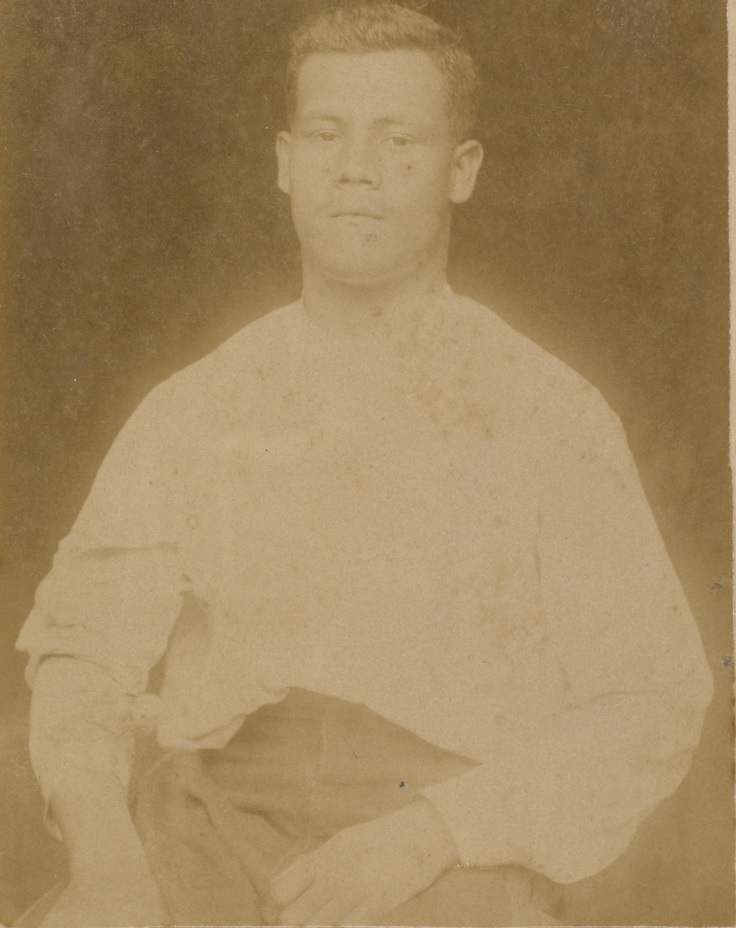
- Melo in an 1897 mugshot
- Born: June 30, 1875; Murici, Brazil
- Died: January 14, 1898 (aged 22); Rio de Janeiro, Brazil
- Cause of death: Suicide
- Military career
- Branch: Brazilian Army
- Rank: Lance Corporal
- Known for: for the murder of Carlos Machado de Bittencourt and attempting to assassinated Prudente de Morais
- Conflicts: Canudos War

Marcelino Bispo de Melo (30 June 1875 – 14 January 1898) was a Brazilian military officer who was arrested for the murder of Carlos Machado de Bittencourt, Brazil's Minister of War, and for attempting to assassinate President Prudente de Morais. Marcelino hanged himself in his cell with a bed sheet.

== Early life ==
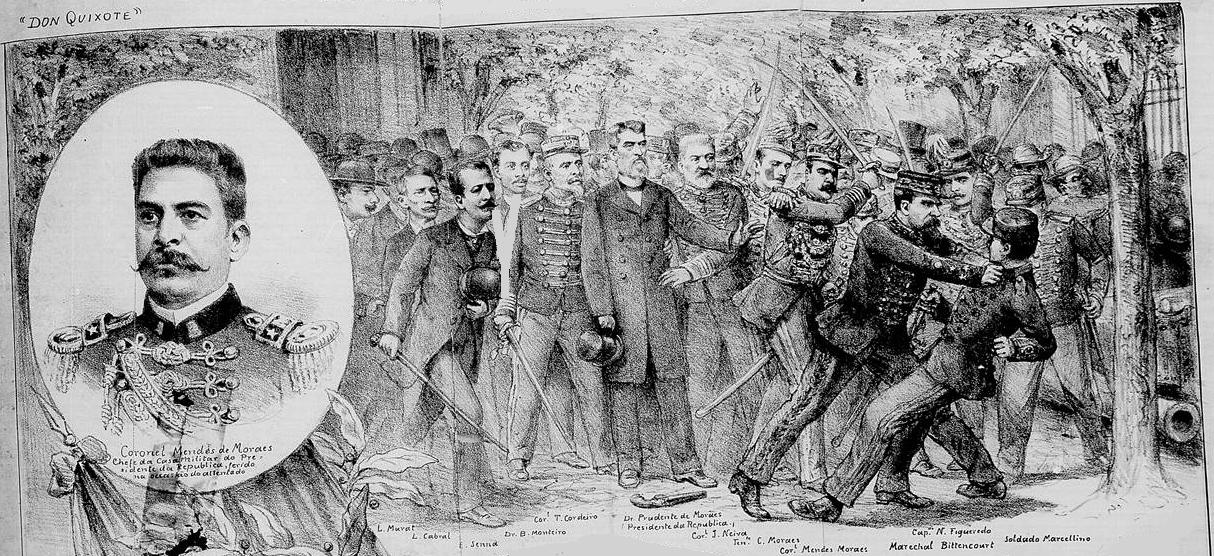
An illustration of the assassination attempt on 5 November 1897

Marcelino was born to a well-respected caboclo family in Murici. In 1881, Marcelino's father died from injuries sustained from a fall of his horse and in 1890, Marcelino ran away from home when he was 15-years-old. In 1895, Marcelino worked as a railway worker in São José da Lage. He briefly worked as an officer for the Recife municipal police but left and decided to join the Brazilian Army.

=== Military career ===
Marcelino was initially a private in the 2nd Battalion and was stationed in Pernambuco. Marcelino was then transferred to 33rd Battalion and was stationed in Maceió in June 1896. Marcelino and his battalion then moved to Rio de Janeiro in September 1896.

== The attack and the aftermath ==
On 7 November 1897, President Prudente de Morais, Minister Bittencourt, Colonel Luiz Mendes de Moraes along with several other military officials visited Rio de Janeiro's War Arsenal (the current National Historical Museum building) for a military ceremony, following Brazil's victory in the Canudos War. While the president was viewing the parade, Marcelino approached and attempted to fire a double-barreled pistol at the president. However, the gun misfired and Bittencourt and Colonel Moraes attempted to restrain Marcelino. However, Marcelino produced a dagger and repeatedly stabbed both the men. As a result, Bittencourt died and Moraes was heavily wounded. Marcelino was arrested and taken to a prison within the city. While in prison, Marcelino revealed that he was a part of a radical Republican group who wanted Prudente dead (known as the Jacobins) and listed two fellow conspirators in the plot: Captain Deocleciano Martyr and José de Souza Velloso.

=== Death ===
On 14 January 1898, (2 months and 7 days from the assassination), Marcelino was found dead hanging in his cell. He had used a bed sheet to hang himself and he left no note.
