= Joaquim Murtinho =

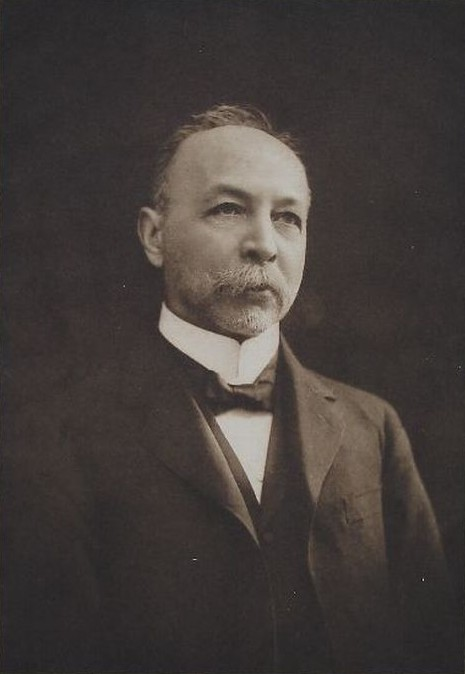
- Dr. Joaquim Duarte Murtinho

Minister of Finance
- In office November 15, 1898 – September 2, 1902
- President: Campos Sales
- Preceded by: Bernardino de Campos
- Succeeded by: Sabino Barroso

Minister of Industry, Transport and Public Works
- In office November 20, 1896 – October 1, 1897
- President: Manuel Vitorino (acting); Prudente de Morais
- Preceded by: Antônio Olinto
- Succeeded by: Sebastião Lacerda

Senator for Mato Grosso
- In office May 3, 1903 – November 18, 1911
- Preceded by: Generoso Ponce
- Succeeded by: José Murtinho
- In office November 15, 1890 – November 20, 1896
- Preceded by: Seat established by Decree No. 510 of 1890
- Succeeded by: Antônio Azeredo

Personal details
- Born: Joaquim Duarte Murtinho Nobre; December 7, 1848 Cuiabá, Mato Grosso, Brazil
- Died: November 18, 1911 (aged 62) Rio de Janeiro, Federal District, Brazil
- Education: School of Medicine of Rio de Janeiro
- Profession: Physician

Joaquim Murtinho (December 7, 1848 – November 18, 1911, born Joaquim Duarte Murtinho) was a Brazilian physician and politician. Murtinho was born in Cuiabá, the capital of Mato Grosso, and moved to Rio de Janeiro for his education. He graduated from the Faculty of Medicine of Rio de Janeiro and became a physician and later a politician. Murtinho initially served as Minister of Industry, and Commerce (1899–1902) under president Prudente de Morais; then pursued austerity measures as Minister of Finance (1898–1902) under president Campos Sales. Murtinho also served two non-consecutive terms as senator for Mato Grosso, 1890–1896 and 1903–1911.

Murtinho's Imperial-period birth home, Casa Dom Aquino, is preserved in Cuiabá and is the only of its type remaining in the city. It is also the birthplace of Dom Francisco de Aquino Correia (1885–1956), the archbishop of Cuiabá and a cultural figure; the house is named "Predestination House" (Casa Predestinada) by historians for producing two of the most important figures in the modern history of Mato Grosso. Murtinho is noted as a pioneer of homeopathic medicine in Brazil and published extensively on the topic. The historian Rubens Mendonça called Murtinho the "greatest Brazilian statesman in the Republican period."

His name adorns a number of public spaces in Brazilian cities, most notably Joaquim Murtinho Street in Santa Teresa, Rio de Janeiro, and a homonymous street in Cuiabá, Mato Grosso; as well as a centennial public school in Campo Grande, Mato Grosso do Sul.

== Early life and birth home ==
Joaquim Murtinho was born in a house on the Fazenda Bela Vista, a plantation. While now part of the dense urban fabric of Cuiabá, the house was built a few meters from the Cuiabá River. The river was the only source of transportation and an additional source of food and water. A renovation in 2006 revealed that the plantation house depended on fish from the Cuiabá River and game animals from the surrounding forest; it revealed that residents of the Cuiabá region were self-sufficient, even in 19th-century Brazil.

The plantation house of the Murtinho family is now known as Casa Dom Aquino; it is nicknamed "Predestination House" (Casa Predetinada) by historians for producing two of the most important figures in the modern history of Mato Grosso.^{A} Murtinho was born in the residence in 1848, and it was the birthplace of Dom Francisco de Aquino Correia (1885 – 1956), archbishop of Cuiabá. Both men were deeply influential in the political, economic, and cultural development of both Mato Grosso and Cuiabá. The house was listed as a state-level historic structure by the State Secretary for Culture, Sports and Leisure of Mato Grosso (Secretaria de Estado de Cultura, Esporte e Lazer de Mato Grosso) in 1984.

== Education and medical career ==
Murtinho was educated at the Episcopal Seminary in Cuiabá, the first and only secondary school in Mato Grosso. He graduated in 1861 at age 13, left Cuiabá, and enrolled at Colégio Kopke in Petrópolis in 1861. He then studied at the Episcopal College of São Pedro de Alcântara and Colégio dos Padres Paiva in Rio de Janeiro.

Murtinho studied civil engineering at the Central School of Rio de Janeiro, which became the Escola Politécnica in 1874. He then taught industrial biology, the physical sciences, organic chemistry, and zoology at the Polytechnic School. Murtinho left teaching to study medicine, and graduated from the Faculty of Medicine of Rio de Janeiro in 1875 with a specialization in homeopathy. He wrote several publications on medicine, served as an editor of early Brazilian medical journals, and is known as a pioneer of homeopathic medicine in Brazil. He was president of the Hahnemannian Institute of Brazil, which introduced homeopathy into the medical services of the Brazilian Navy and Army.

== Political career ==
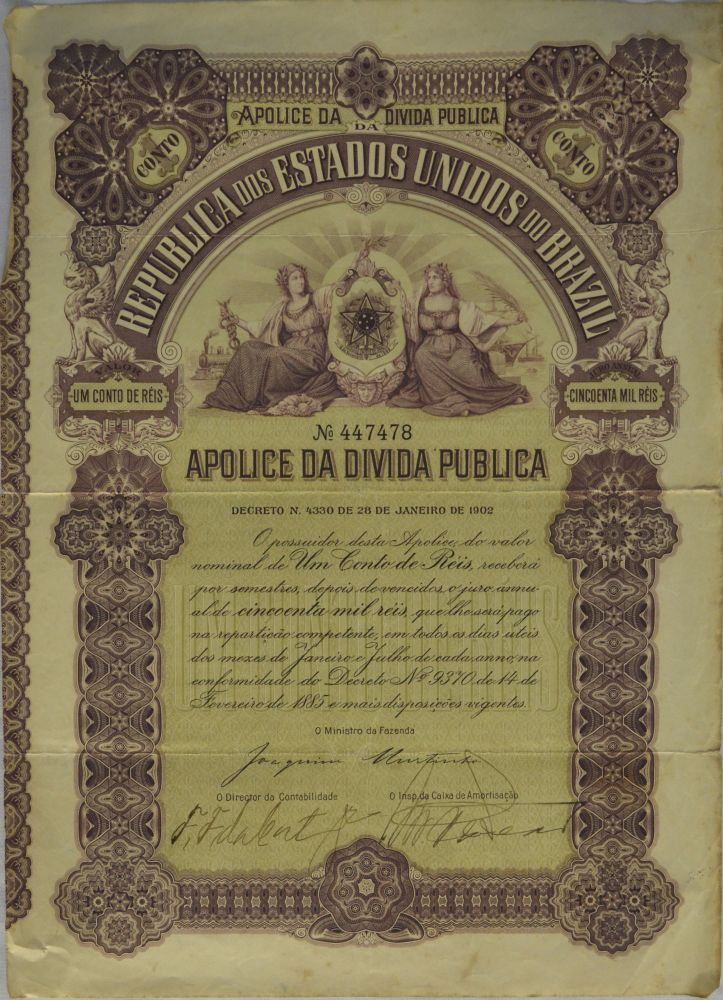
1902 decree of the Brazilian Ministry of Finance signed by Joaquim Murtinho

Joaquim Murtinho left medicine for a political career, a practice common in post-colonial Brazil. He served two non-consecutive terms and as a government minister. Murtinho initially served as Minister of Industry, Transport and Public Works (1899–1902) under Prudente de Morais, the fourth President of Brazil; and Minister of Finance (1898–1902) under president Campos Sales.

Murtinho inherited the financial aftermath of the Encilhamento during his tenure as Finance Minister. The Encilhamento was an economic bubble at the beginning of the First Brazilian Republic (1889–1894). The Viscount of Ouro Preto and Ruy Barbosa, finance ministers, promoted unrestricted credit for industrial investments and backed it with unrestrained issuance of money. The Encilhamento left the Campos Sales administration in great financial imbalance. Murtinho's austerity measures "provid[ed] invaluable service in the rehabilitation of the country's credit" during his tenure at the Finance Ministry.

Murtinho also inherited problems related to the coffee industry in Brazil, with tensions related to the end of slavery in Brazil in 1888, large coffee producers, and sharecroppers. The historian Delfim Netto stated: "Murtinho believed that the solution to the problem should be found by the market itself, which would be responsible for eliminating marginal producers. It is he himself who tells us this in the Report of the Ministry of Finance of 1899." Murtinho stated in the Relatório apresentado ao presidente da República dos Estados Unidos do Brazil pelo Ministro de Estado dos Negócios da Fazenda Joaquim Murtinho no anno de 1899, 11º da República: "Convinced that official intervention could only increase our ills, the government allowed coffee production to be reduced by natural selection, thus determining the liquidation and elimination of those who had no living conditions, leaving it in the hands of the strongest and those most organized for the fight".

Murtinho served two non-consecutive terms as senator for Mato Grosso. His first term, 1890–1896, came after the establishment of the First Brazilian Republic. He served a second term, 1903–1911. Murtinho was also active in commerce, and was a large financier in the Brazilian Republican period.

== Personal life and death ==
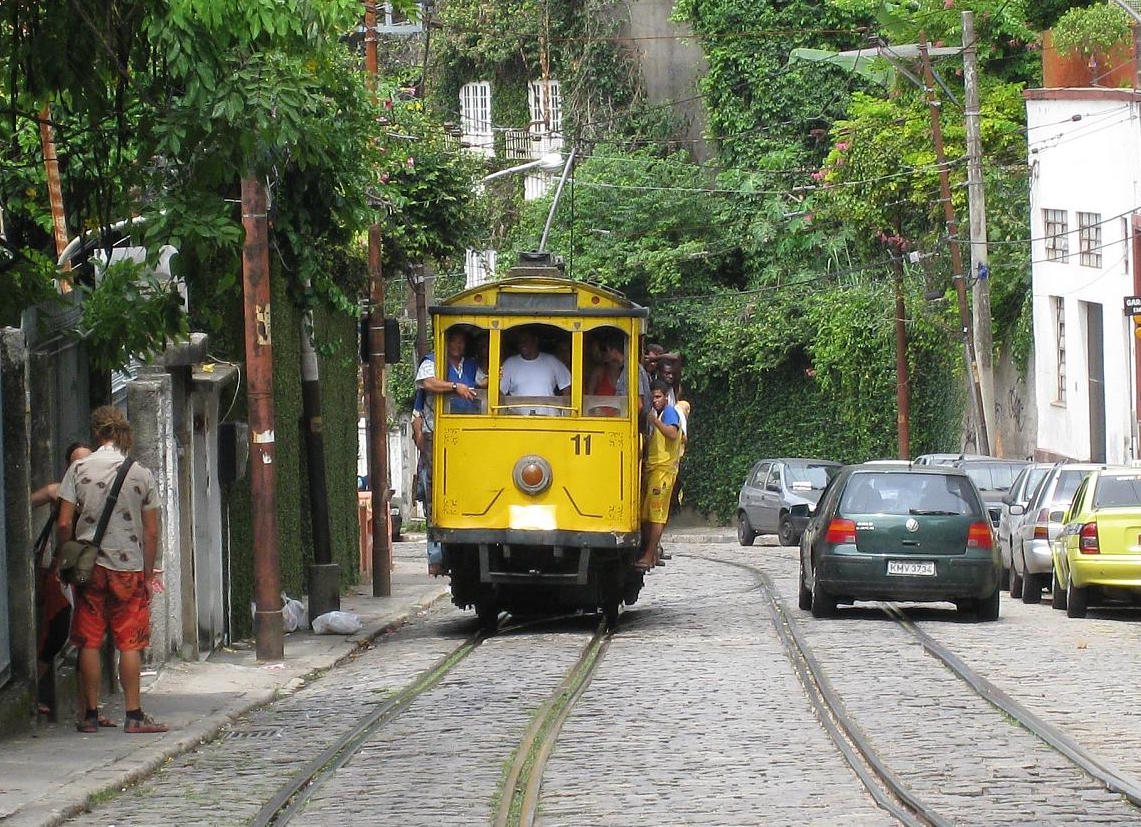
Rua Joaquim Murtinho (street) on Rio de Janeiro's Santa Teresa tram line (2008)

Joaquim Murtinho was the third son of José Antônio Murtinho (1814 – 1888), a noted military doctor and politician of the Brazilian Empire. Joaquim Murtinho was a product of his marriage to his first wife Rosa Joaquina Pinheiro. José Antônio Murtinho was Chief Surgeon Officer of the Brazilian Army, and was elected vice-president and president of the province of Mato Grosso in the mid-19th century. Murtinho's older brothers José Antônio Murtinho and Manuel José Murtinho were also politicians, serving as a Senator for the Republic for Mato Grosso and Minister of the Supreme Federal Court respectively.

Joaquim Murtinho died in Rio de Janeiro on November 18, 1911.

== Noted works ==
- Respiração em Geral, (thesis presented to the Faculty of Medicine at the Federal University of Rio de Janeiro, 1872)
- Acústica
- Aeupressura

Murtinho additional served as an editor of the Arquivos da Medicina and Anais de Medicina Homeopática (1882-1887), both pioneering medical publications in Brazil.

== Footnote ==
A.The house is known as Casa Dom Aquino, despite being both the birthplace of Joaquim Murtinho and Dom Francisco de Aquino Correia. It now houses the Mato Grosso Museum of Prehistory.
