= Inauguration of Prudente de Morais =

Presidential Inauguration of Prudente de Morais
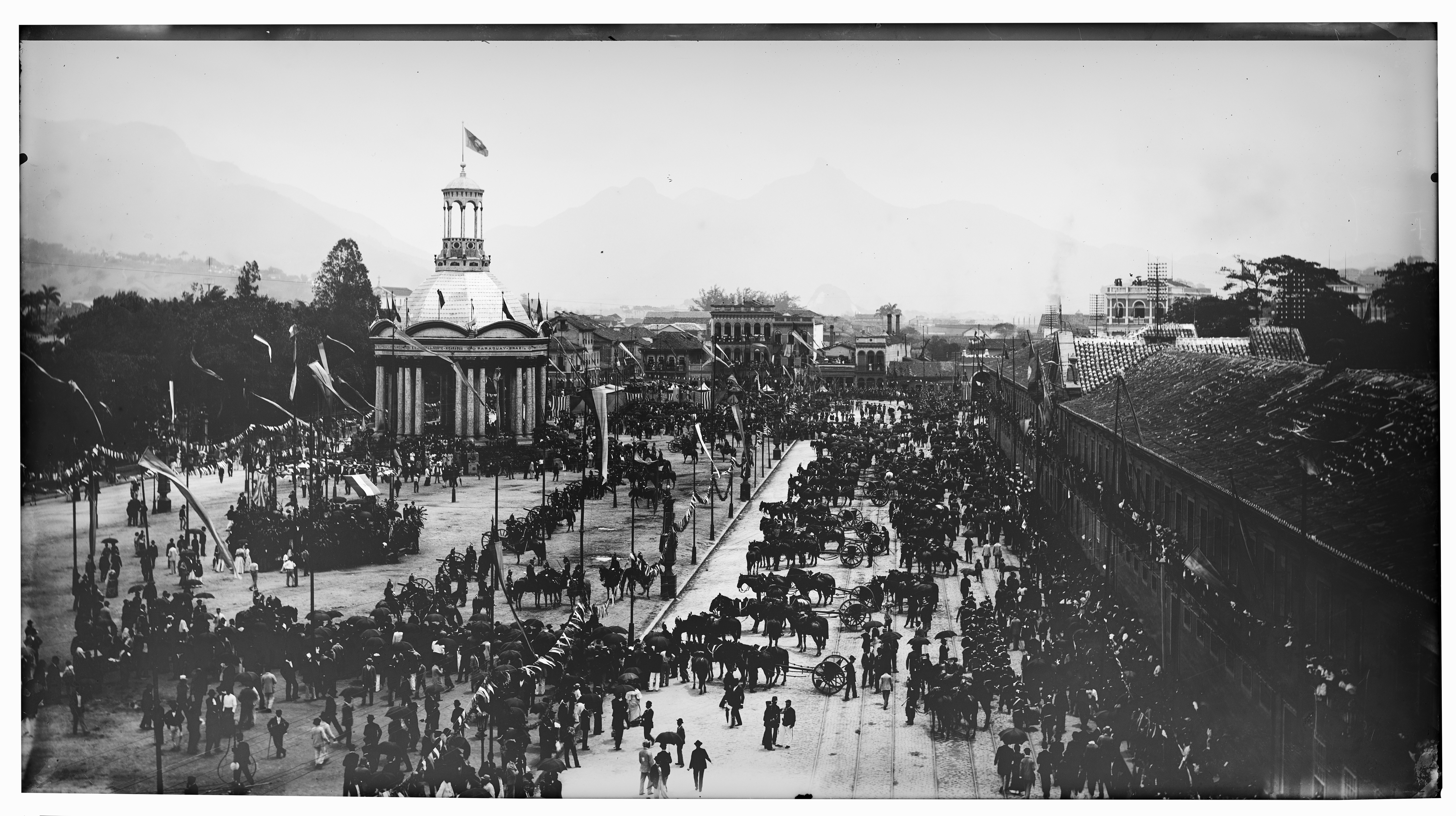
- Date: 15 November 1894; 131 years ago
- Location: Rio de Janeiro, Federal District, Brazil
- Participants: Prudente de Morais; 3rd president of Brazil — Assuming office Ubaldino do Amaral; Senator — Administering oath

The inauguration of Prudente de Morais as the 3rd president of Brazil was held on 15 November 1894 in the National Congress of Brazil in Rio de Janeiro, Federal District. The inauguration marked the commencement of the only four-year term of Prudente de Morais as president and of Manuel Vitorino as vice president.

== Background ==
Prudente de Morais was the first president of Brazil to be elected by direct vote and the first civilian president of Brazil. His inauguration marked the end of military rule in the country, characterized by the presidencies of Deodoro da Fonseca and Floriano Peixoto - which followed the proclamation of the republic - beginning the representation of the interests of the agricultural and São Paulo civilian oligarchies, especially those in the coffee sector, in Brazil's government.

== Gallery ==
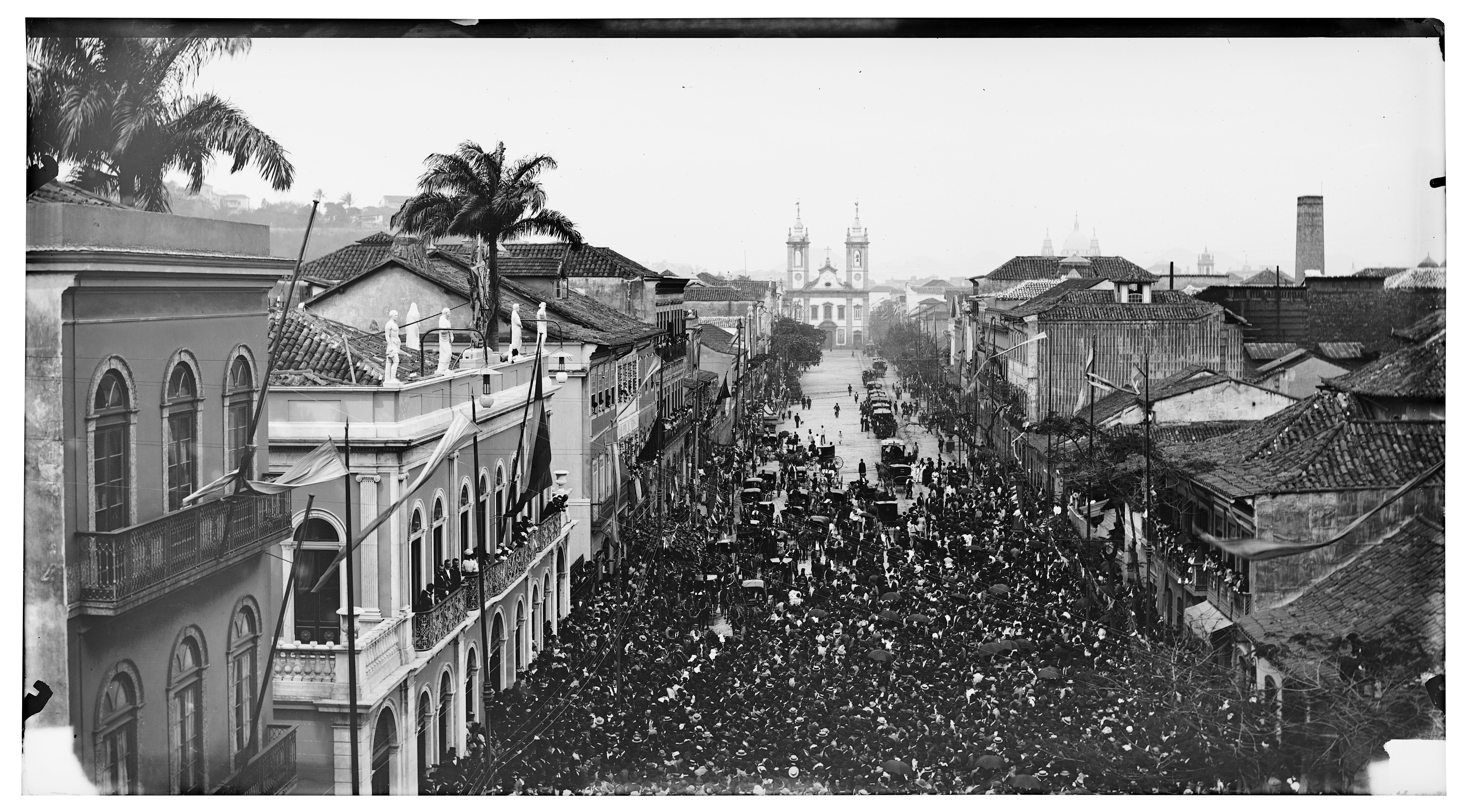

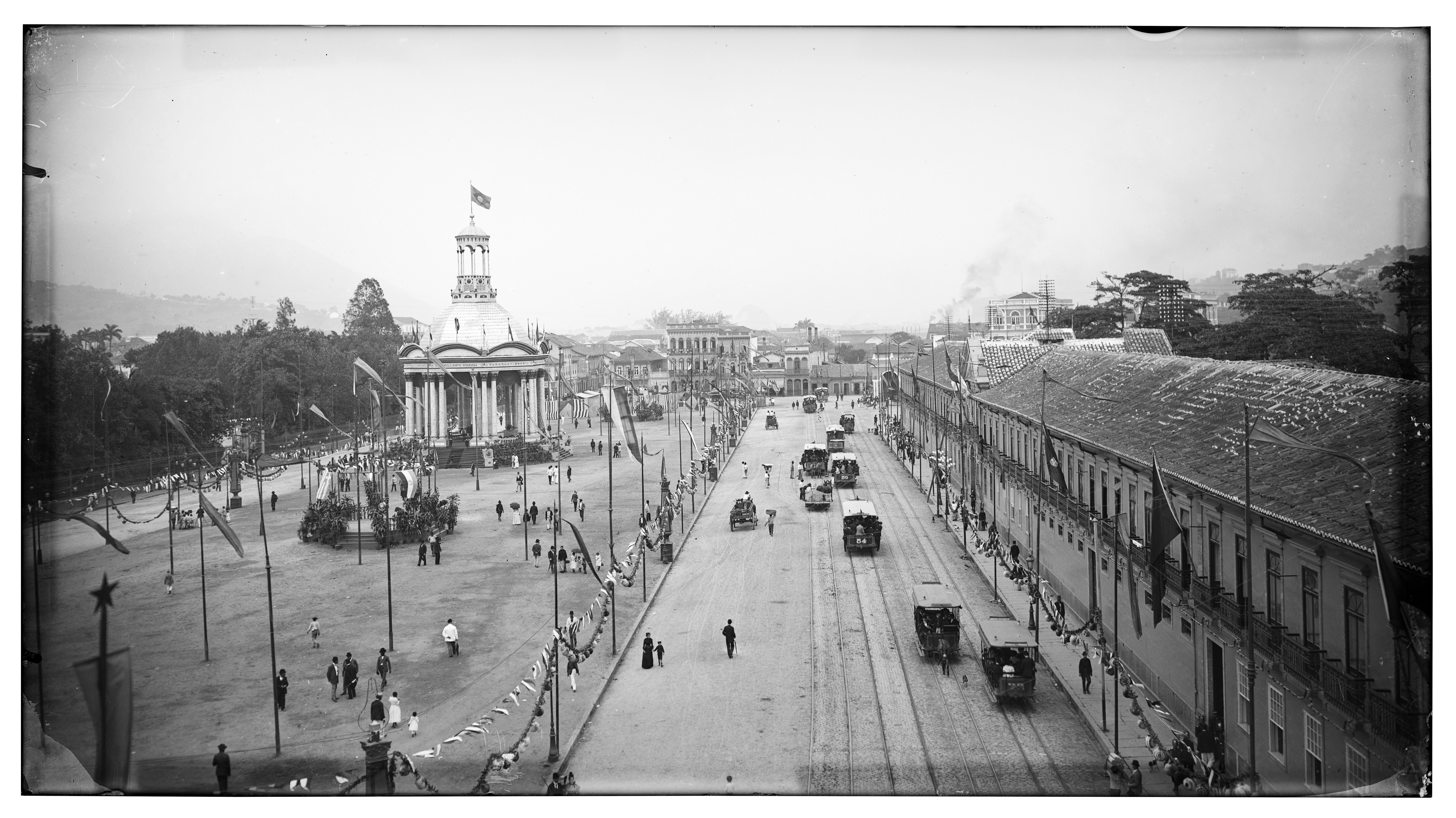

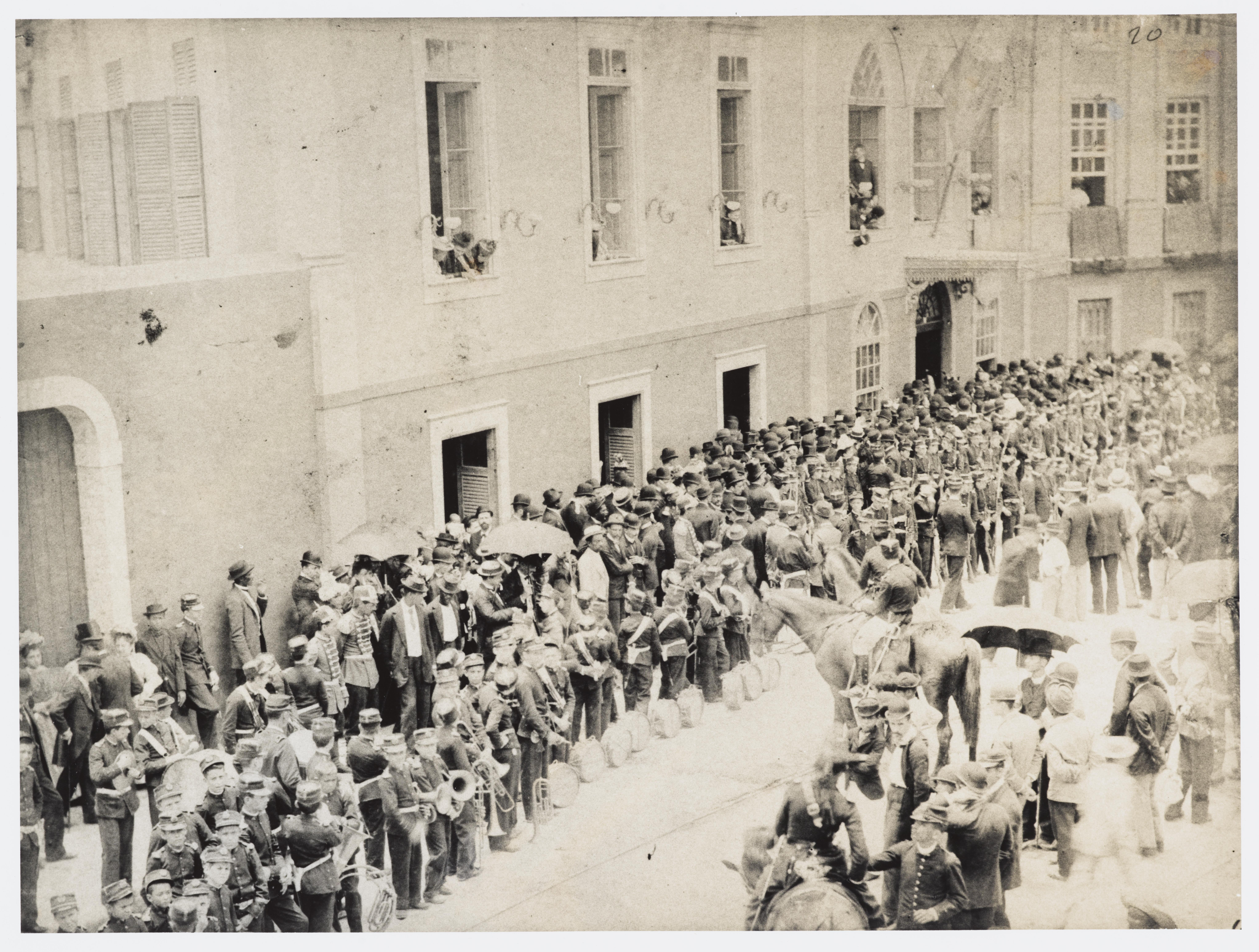

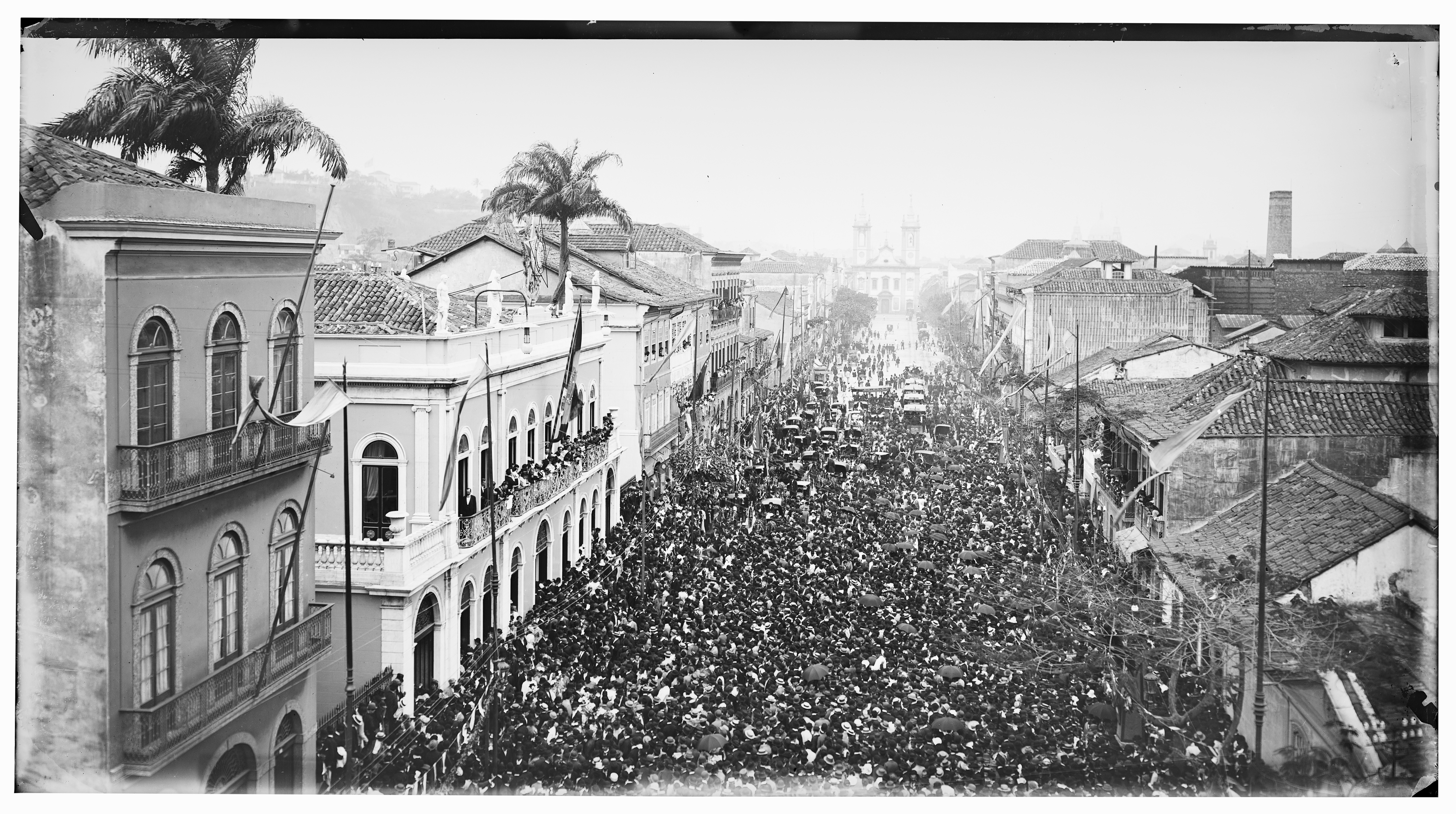
