= Bernardino de Campos (politician) =

Brazilian politician (1841–1915)

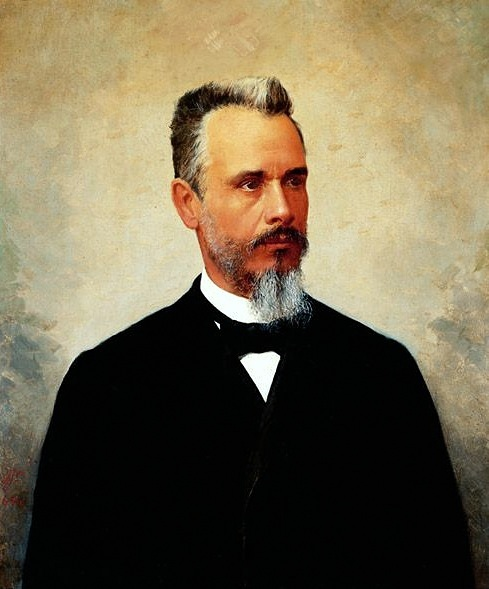
- Portrait by Almeida Júnior, 1896

President of São Paulo
- In office 3 July 1902 – 1 May 1904
- Vice President: Domingos de Morais
- Preceded by: Domingos de Morais
- Succeeded by: Jorge Tibiriçá
- In office 23 August 1892 – 15 April 1896
- Vice President: Cerqueira César
- Preceded by: Cerqueira César
- Succeeded by: Peixoto Gomide

Senator for São Paulo
- In office 3 May 1900 – 3 July 1902
- Preceded by: Rodrigues Alves
- Succeeded by: Francisco Glicério
- In office 20 July 1896 – 20 November 1896
- Preceded by: Campos Sales
- Succeeded by: Rodrigues Alves

Minister of Finance
- In office 20 November 1896 – 15 November 1898
- President: Manuel Vitorino (acting); Prudente de Morais
- Preceded by: Rodrigues Alves
- Succeeded by: Joaquim Murtinho

President of the Chamber of Deputies
- In office 31 October 1891 – 18 August 1892
- Preceded by: Mata Machado
- Succeeded by: João Lopes

Member of the Chamber of Deputies
- In office 15 November 1890 – 18 August 1892
- Constituency: São Paulo

Personal details
- Born: 6 September 1841 Pouso Alegre, Minas Gerais, Brazil
- Died: 18 January 1915 (aged 73) São Paulo, São Paulo, Brazil
- Spouse: Francisca de Barros Duarte (m. 1865)
- Children: 16
- Education: Faculty of Law of Largo de São Francisco

Bernardino José de Campos Júnior (6 September 1841 – 18 January 1915) was a Brazilian politician. He was governor of São Paulo from 23 August 1892 to 15 April 1896 and 3 July 1902 to 1 May 1904.

Campos was born in Pouso Alegre. He served as the President of the Chamber of Deputies from 1891 to 1892. He was also Minister of Finance from 1896 to 1898, and a senator.

The city of Bernardino de Campos is named after him.

== Bibliography ==
- SANTOS, José Maria dos, Bernardino de Campos e o Partido Republicano Paulista, Rj, Jose Olympio, 1960.
