= 1918 Brazilian general election =

- 1 March 1918
- Presidential election
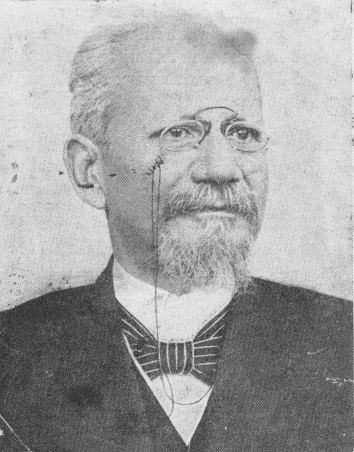

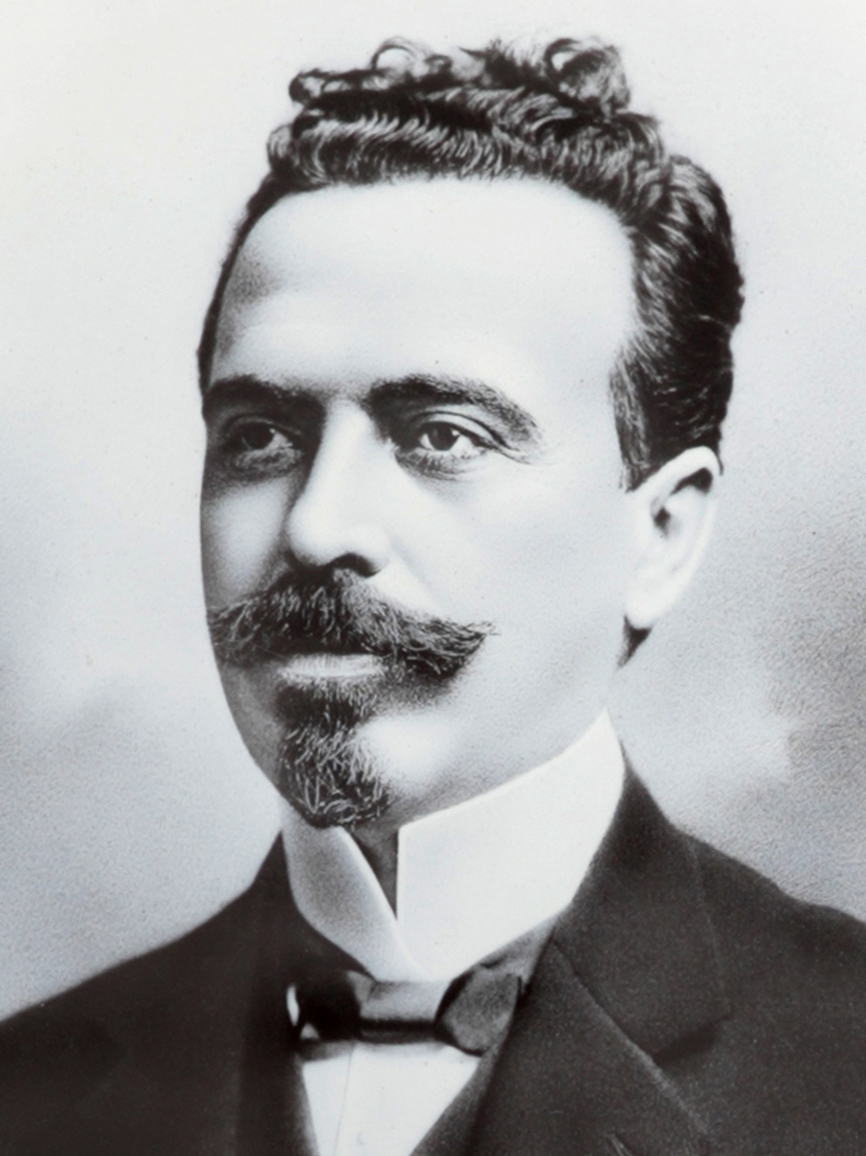
Nominee	Rodrigues Alves	Nilo Peçanha
Party	PRP	PRF
Popular vote	386,467	1,258
Percentage	99.06%	0.32%
- Results by state

General elections were held in Brazil on 1 March 1918. The presidential elections were won by former President Rodrigues Alves, who received 99% of the vote. However, he died of the Spanish flu in 1919 before he could take office. Vice-president Delfim Moreira became Acting President until fresh elections were held on 13 April 1919.

== Results ==
The estimated population of Brazil in 1918 was of 28.9 million, of which just 1,726,000 were eligible to vote.

=== President ===
Candidate	Party	Votes	%
Rodrigues Alves	Paulista Republican Party	386,467	99.06
Nilo Peçanha	Fluminense Republican Party	1,258	0.32
Ruy Barbosa	Independent	1,014	0.26
Other candidates		1,392	0.36
Total		390,131	100.00
Source: Nohlen
