= 1919 Brazilian presidential election =

- 13 April 1919

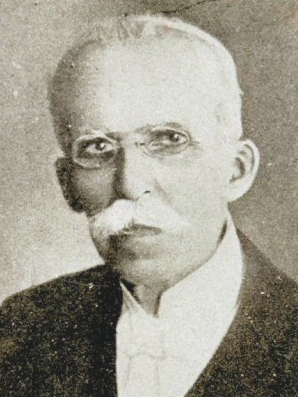
Nominee	Epitácio Pessoa	Ruy Barbosa
Party	PR Paraíba	Independent
Popular vote	286,373	116,414
Percentage	71%	28.86%
- Results by state
President before election
Delfim Moreira
PRP
Elected President
Epitácio Pessoa
PR Paraíba

Early presidential elections were held in Brazil on 13 April 1919, following the death of Rodrigues Alves, who had been elected the previous year. The result was a victory for Epitácio Pessoa of the Paraíba Republican Party (and supported by the Paulista Republican Party and the Mineiro Republican Party), who received 71% of the vote.

== Results ==
Candidate	Party	Votes	%
Epitácio Pessoa	Paraíba Republican Party	286,373	71.00
Ruy Barbosa	Independent	116,414	28.86
Other candidates		528	0.13
Total		403,315	100.00
Source: Nohlen
