= 1902 Brazilian presidential election =

- 1 March 1902
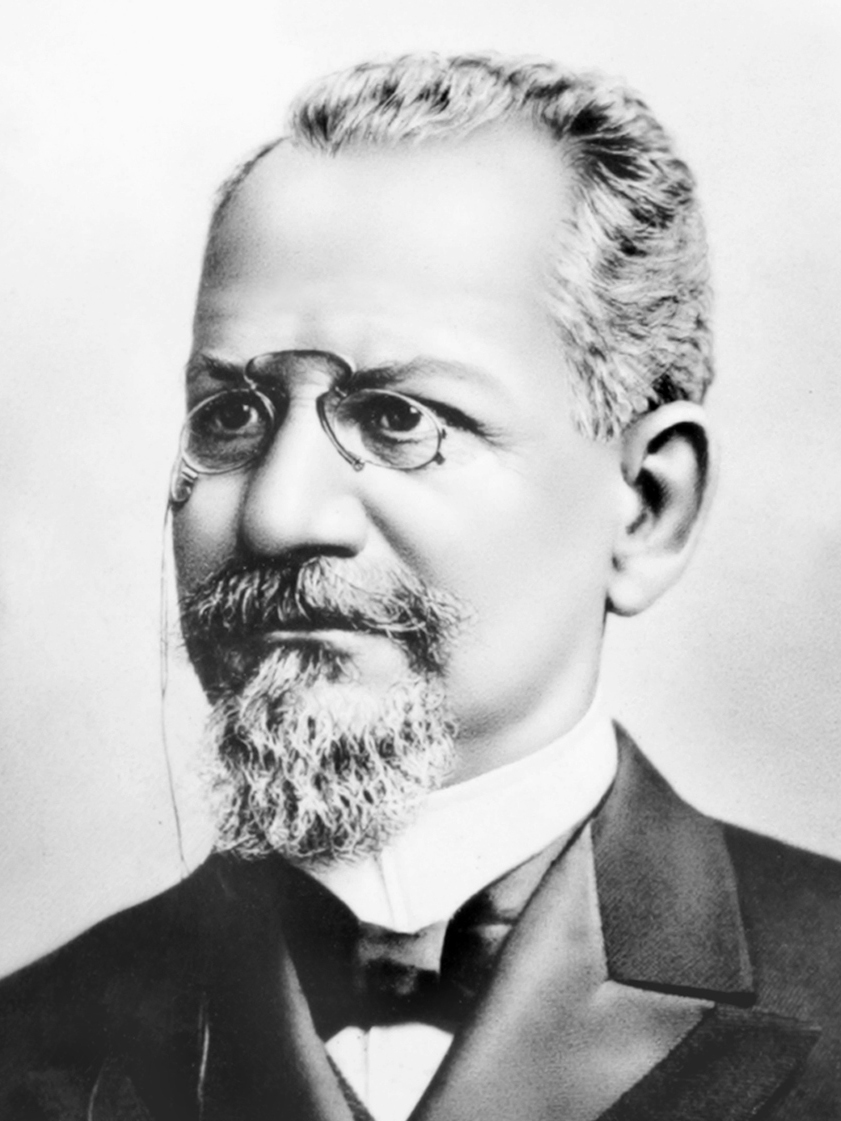

Nominee	Rodrigues Alves	Quintino Bocaiuva
Party	PRP	PRF
Popular vote	592,039	42,542
Percentage	91.71%	6.59%
- Results by state
President before election
Campos Sales
PRP
Elected President
Rodrigues Alves
PRP

Presidential elections were held in Brazil on 1 March 1902. The result was a victory for Rodrigues Alves of the Paulista Republican Party, who received 92% of the vote.

== Results ==
Candidate	Party	Votes	%
Rodrigues Alves	Paulista Republican Party	592,039	91.71
Quintino Bocaiuva	Fluminense Republican Party	42,542	6.59
Ubaldino Fontoura	Fluminense Republican Party	5,371	0.83
Other candidates		5,579	0.86
Total		645,531	100.00
Source: Nohlen
