= Rodrigues Alves =

President of Brazil from 1902 to 1906

His Excellency Rodrigues Alves
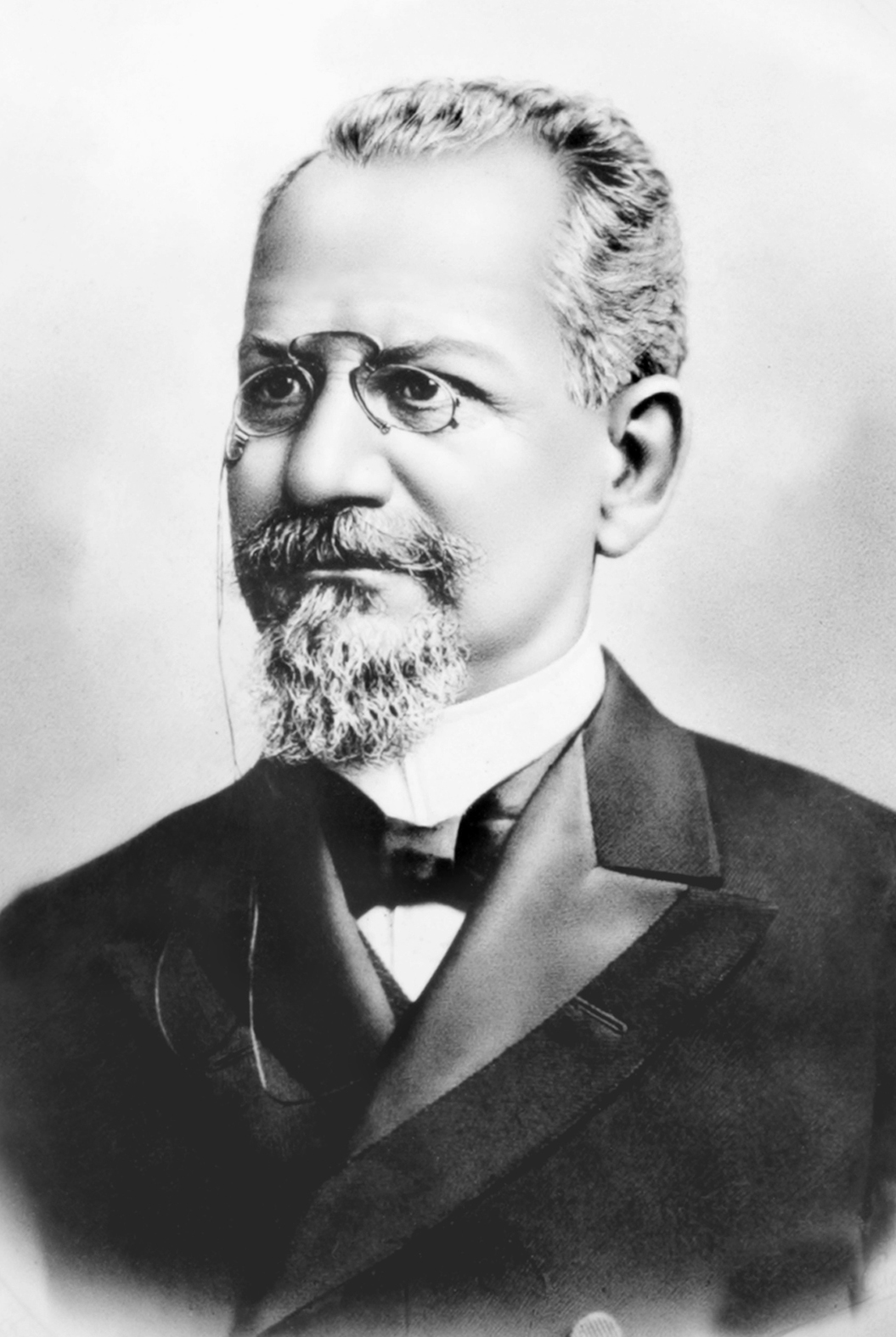
- Official portrait, 1902

5th President of Brazil
- In office 15 November 1902 – 15 November 1906
- Vice President: Silviano Brandão (elect); None (1902–1903); Afonso Pena (1903–1906)
- Preceded by: Campos Sales
- Succeeded by: Afonso Pena

6th President-elect of Brazil
- In role 1 March 1918 – 16 January 1919
- Vice President: Delfim Moreira (elect)
- Preceded by: Venceslau Brás (1914)
- Succeeded by: Epitácio Pessoa (1919)
Executive offices
President of São Paulo
In office 1 May 1912 – 1 May 1916
Vice President	Pereira Guimarães
Preceded by	Albuquerque Lins
Succeeded by	Altino Arantes
In office 1 May 1900 – 13 February 1902
Vice President	Domingos de Morais
Preceded by	Fernando Prestes
Succeeded by	Domingos de Morais
In office 19 November 1887 – 27 April 1888
Preceded by	Count of Parnaíba
Succeeded by	Dutra Rodrigues
Minister of Finance
In office 15 November 1894 – 20 November 1896
President	Prudente de Morais
Preceded by	Felisbelo Freire
Succeeded by	Bernardino de Campos
In office 26 November 1891 – 31 August 1892
President	Floriano Peixoto
Preceded by	Antão Gonçalves de Faria
Succeeded by	Serzedelo Correia
Legislative offices
1916–1918	Senator
1897–1900	Senator
1893–1894	Senator
1887–1888	General Deputy
1878–1879	Provincial Deputy
1872–1875	Provincial Deputy

Personal details
- Born: Francisco de Paula Rodrigues Alves; 7 July 1848 Guaratinguetá, São Paulo, Empire of Brazil
- Died: 16 January 1919 (aged 70) Rio de Janeiro, Federal District, Brazil
- Party: Conservative (before 1889); PRP (1889–1919)
- Spouse: Ana Guilhermina Borges
- Profession: Lawyer; politician
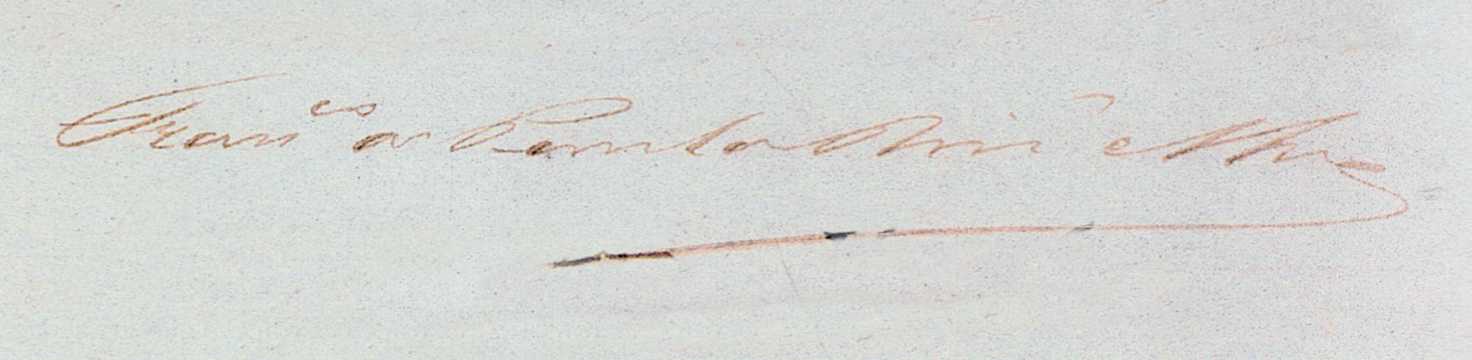
- Signature

Francisco de Paula Rodrigues Alves (Brazilian Portuguese pronunciation: [fɾɐ̃ˈsisku dʒi ˈpawlɐ ʁoˈdɾiɡiz ˈawvis]. 7 July 1848 – 16 January 1919) was a Brazilian politician and statesman who served as the fifth president of Brazil, from 1902 to 1906. Alves was elected in 1902, becoming the third consecutive São Paulo native to hold the presidency. Before his presidency, he served as president of the province of São Paulo during the Empire of Brazil (1887) and as finance minister under Floriano Peixoto and Prudente de Morais in the 1890s.

During his term, Rodrigues Alves promoted a series of urban renewals and sanitation campaigns in Rio de Janeiro, then the Brazilian capital, which led to the outbreak of the Vaccine Revolt in 1904.

Rodrigues Alves was elected president for a second term in 1918, but died of the Spanish flu pandemic before assuming power, on 16 January 1919. He was succeeded by his vice-president, Delfim Moreira.

== Early life ==
Rodrigues Alves was born in the city of Guaratinguetá, São Paulo. He graduated as a lawyer from the Faculdade de Direito do Largo de São Francisco, São Paulo, in 1870. His public career started as councilman in his native city, from 1866 to 1870. He became prosecutor in 1870. In 1872 he became a member of the state house of representatives until 1879, and became known for his views on education, which he believed should be compulsory and free. Also during the period of the Empire of Brazil, he took office as president of the province of São Paulo, from 1887 until 1888 as a conservative. During his state presidency, he clashed with liberal forces regarding the emancipation of slaves, and repressed what he thought to be "excessive liberalization" measures, and as a result, he was labelled a "Slavocrat". When the conservative cabinet he had been a part of was replaced by a new liberal cabinet, with the Viscount of Ours Preto at its head, he was not re-elected. When the Republic was proclaimed, Rodrigues Alves, like most other monarchists, did not resist, and saw it as a fait accompli. After the proclamation of the Republic, he intended to retire from politics, but agreed to serve as a delegate for São Paulo in Constitutional Assembly, and also a member of the house of representatives (1891/1893). He occupied the position of Treasury Secretary twice, from 1891 to 1892 and from 1894 to 1896.

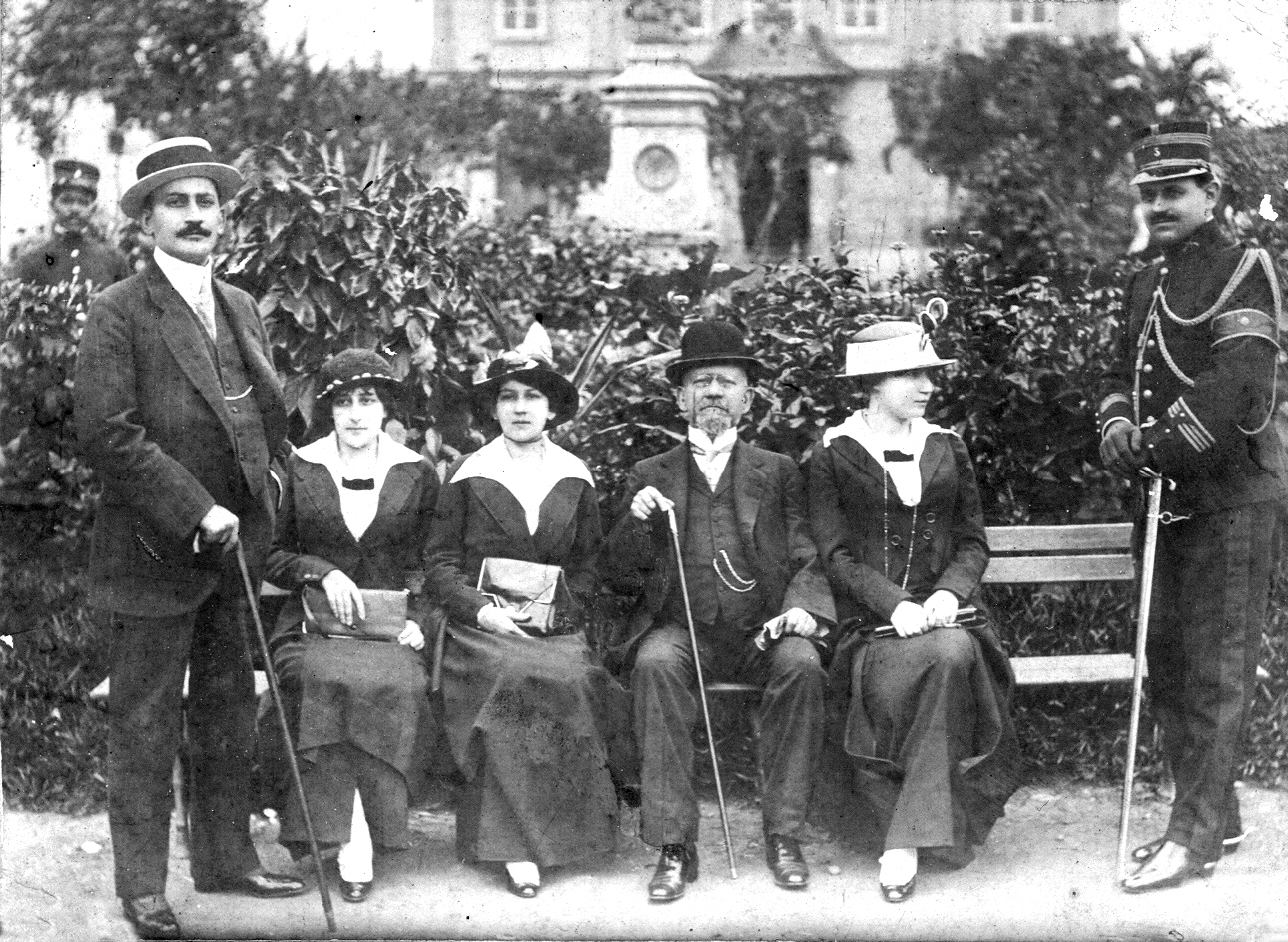
Rodrigues Alves and his children, 1913.

He assumed his second mandate as state president in São Paulo from 1 May 1900 to 13 February 1902. On February 13 he resigned to run for Brazil's presidency as the previous president, Campos Sales' appointed successor, and won with 91% of the vote.

== Presidency (1902–1906) ==
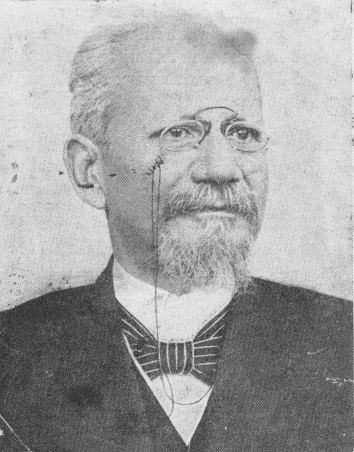
- Presidency of Rodrigues Alves; 1902–1906
- Standard of the President

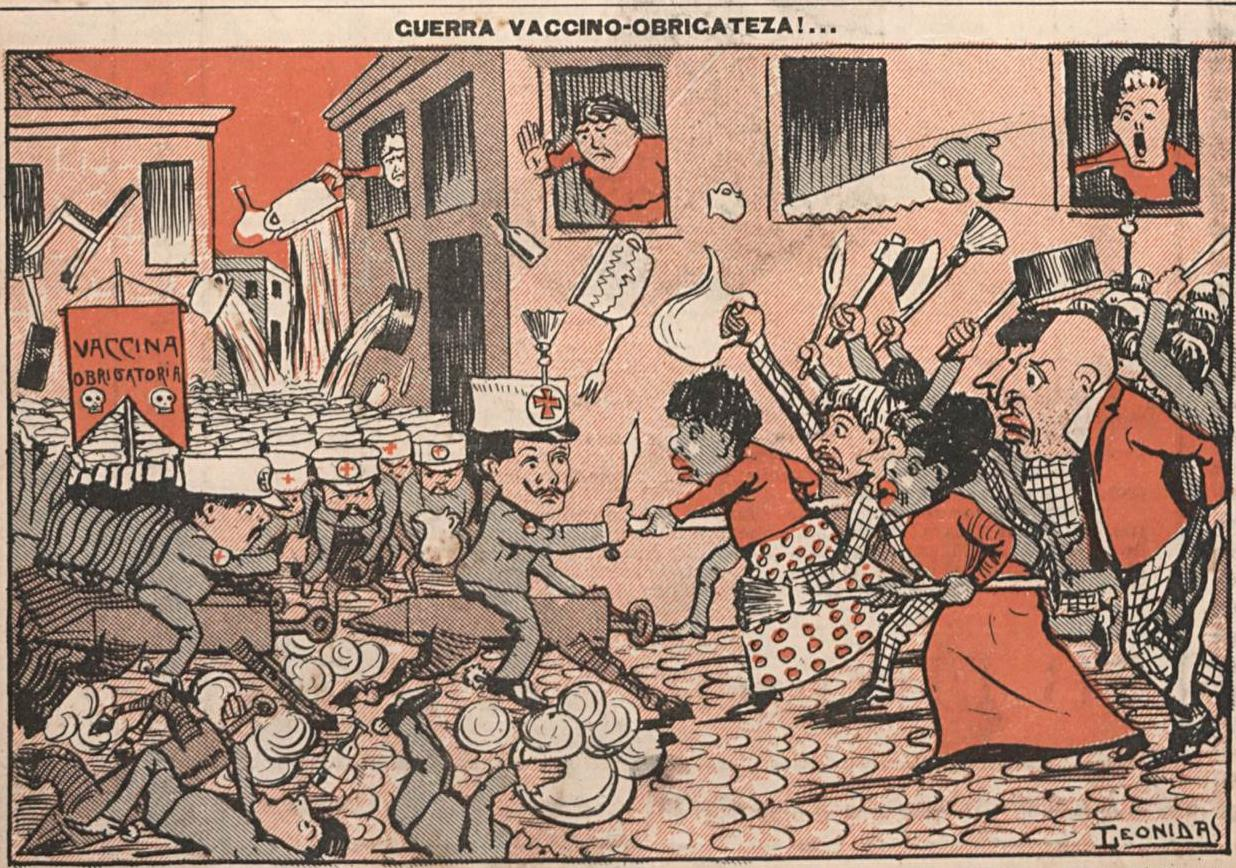
Cartoon depicting the Vaccine Revolt.

Upon taking office, according to his biographer, Gastão Pereira da Silva, his main objective was to improve the sanitation in the capital city, Rio de Janeiro, and to improve its harbour. Alves believed that the city's poor sanitation weakened the entire nation's communities and also ruined its image abroad. Rio de Janeiro's population had increased twofold, and the city had not been prepared to face the rapid spread of diseases. Families lived in a single house and rats and mosquitos were rampant. Rodrigues Alves appointed members of his cabinet based on how capable he considered them to be, and did not include any politicians from "the big states", and gave the people he appointed a free hand within his program.

His administration created a program to eliminate diseases such as bubonic plague and yellow fever in the capital and remodel it, the plans drew skepticism from the public, who believed that he was squandering money and reviving the illusions that caused the Encilhamento. Few believed the plans could succeed. Among his presidencial cabinet was the first minister of the navy in the history of Brazil, Julio de César Noronha. During his presidency, he appointed Oswaldo Cruz to handle public health, and Pereira Passos as Mayor of Rio de Janeiro.

Oswaldo Cruz had hardly announced his measures when strong opposition lined up against him, headed by groups of politicians and military officers who aimed to revive the idea of a military dictatorship. Local newspapers stirred up popular prejudice against him and his assistants, eager for scandal, and labelled them "mosquito swatters", while writers and journalists frequently satirised him. The courts issued habeas corpus to protect people against the cleaning efforts of public workers. Despite criticism, he continued on with his plans. In 1903, deaths from yellow fever were 584. The next year, they had decreased to 53. By 1906, the plague had practically disappeared. After solving the problem of Yellow fever, he turned his attention to smallpox, and issued mandatory vaccination in Rio de Janeiro on November 9 of 1904. This caused the Vaccine Revolt as many of the poor saw mandatory vaccination as a struggle against state intervention in their private lives. Following the Vaccine Revolt, opposition to mandatory vaccination eroded, and other cities were stimulated by Rio's example.

While Oswaldo Cruz tackled the healthcare problems of the capital, its mayor, Pereira Passos oversaw its urbanisation, inspired by modern European urban centers. During his mayorship, the port of Rio de Janeiro was extended and the old blocks with their cortiços were demolished, displacing marginalized families while the workers were forced to the rural countryside, where transportation to their workplaces would cost more half or more of their daily salary. The residents were moved to the suburbs, which gave space for the enlargement of streets and new avenues. He also exercised strict city control; he banned beggars from the streets, outlawed cows and other livestock from roaming the city, and forbade spitting in public. The first automobiles began to appear, while the city's light, power and transit systems underwent renovation. Other cities soon followed Rio de Janeiro's example, the city of São Paulo began to rise rapidly. During this time, a new capital for the state of Minas Gerais, was built, Belo Horizonte. The government was able to afford these measures from Brazil's rubber sales; at the time the country produced 97% of all rubber in the world.

=== Foreign Relations ===
Border disputes with Bolivia, Uruguay, British Guiana, and Dutch Guyana were resolved during his presidency by Alves' foreign minister José Maria da Silva Paranhos. In 1903 the Bolivian state of Acre was integrated into Brazil after a 4-year long border conflict between the two countries as the result of the Treaty of Petrópolis. (Though prior to its integration into Brazil there were two secessionist republics named the Republic of Acre) The treaty stated that in exchange for Brazil annexing Acre, 2 million pounds sterling would compensated to Bolivia by Brazil, and the latter would also build the Madeira-Mamoré Railroad. The same year, he faced the first general strike in the capital city on August 15, led by textile workers who demanded raise in salary and the eight-hour work day for all workers.

Rodrigues Alves was never popular among politicians, though he did have the affection and esteem of the nation at large. He was a monarchist which suspicion from republican politicians. He also did not have the full support of São Paulo and its politicians, who still held a grudge against him for refusing to sign the Taubaté Agreement, a coffee Valorisation proposal, and for refusing to name Bernardino de Campos as his successor in the 1906 presidential election. The reason as to why he refused these proposals was because the majority of the states opposed Bernardino's candidacy, while attempts in Brazil's history to artificially increase the price of coffee up to that point had been unsuccessful.

== Later life and death ==
He ran again for the presidency in 1918, won the election with over 99% of the vote, and was scheduled to take office on 15 November 1918. He was unable to do so because of illness, and he died on 16 January 1919, a victim of the Spanish flu epidemic of 1918–1919.

Political offices
Preceded by The Count of Parnaíba	President of the São Paulo Province; 1887–1888	Succeeded by Dutra Rodrigues
Preceded by Fernando Prestes	President of São Paulo; 1900–1902	Succeeded by Domingos Correia de Morais
Preceded by Campos Sales	President of Brazil; 1902–1906	Succeeded by Afonso Pena
Preceded by Albuquerque Lins	President of São Paulo; 1912–1916	Succeeded by Altino Arantes Marques
Preceded by Venceslau Brás	President of Brazil (elect); Did not take office	Succeeded by Delfim Moreira
