= Carlos Machado de Bittencourt =

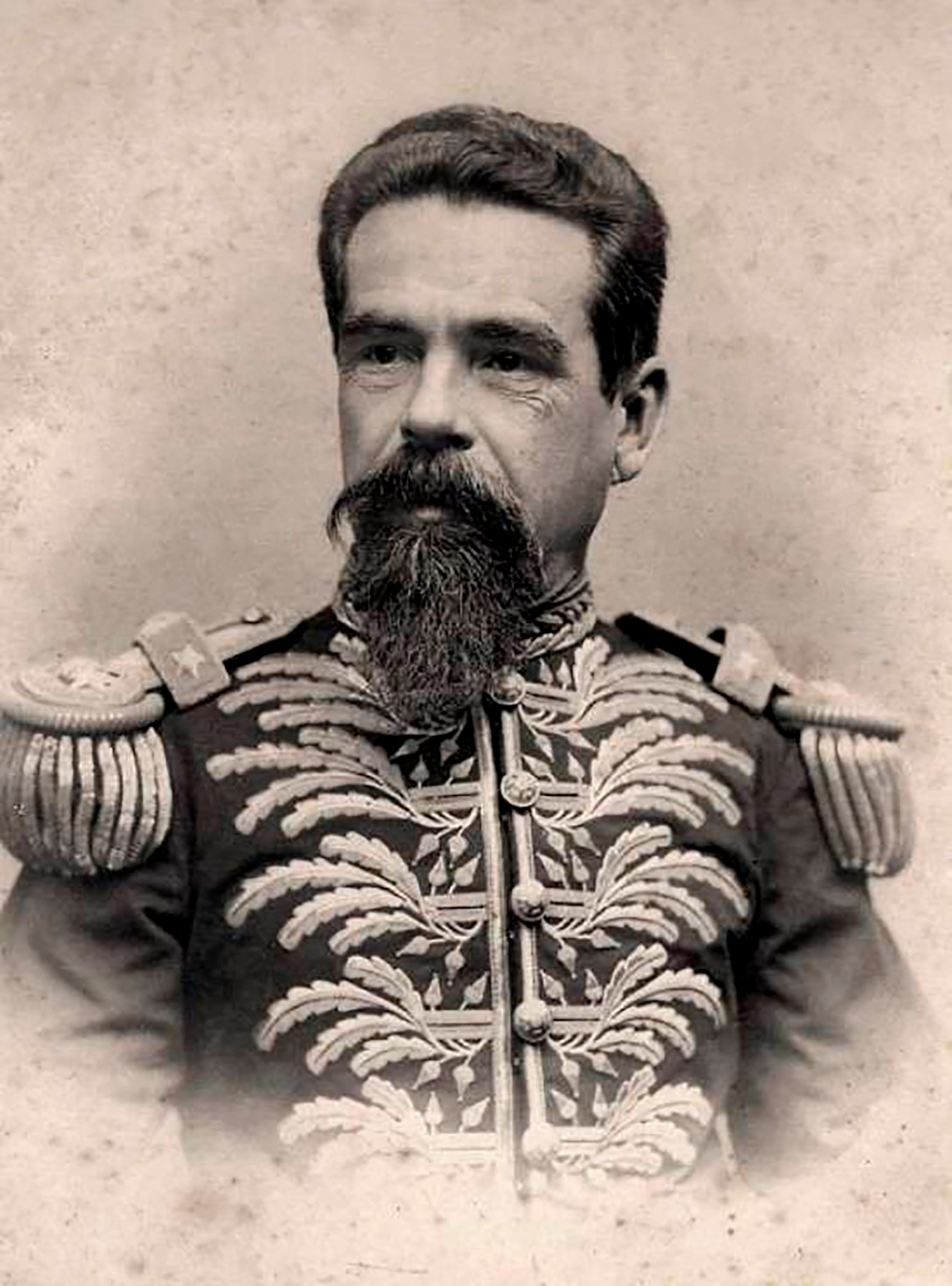
- Bittencourt, 1897

Minister of War
- In office 17 May 1897 – 5 November 1897
- President: Prudente de Morais
- Preceded by: Francisco de Paula Argolo
- Succeeded by: João Tomás de Cantuária

President of Rio Grande do Sul
- In office 13 May 1890 – 23 May 1890
- Preceded by: Francisco da Silva Tavares
- Succeeded by: Cândido José da Costa

Personal details
- Born: 12 April 1840 Porto Alegre, Rio Grande do Sul, Brazil
- Died: 5 November 1897 (aged 57) Rio de Janeiro, Brazil
- Cause of death: Stab wounds
- Awards: Imperial Order of Saint Benedict of Avis (1874), Imperial Order of the Rose (1875)
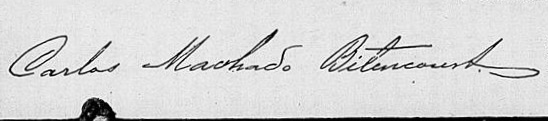
- Signature
- Nickname: "Golden Marshal"

Military service
- Allegiance: Empire of Brazil; First Brazilian Republic
- Branch: Imperial Brazilian Army; Brazilian Army
- Years of service: 1858–1897
- Rank: Marshal
- Battles/wars: Paraguayan War; Battle of Tuyutí; War of Canudos

Carlos Machado de Bittencourt (12 April 1840 – 5 November 1897) was a Brazilian military Marshal, war criminal and the 2nd Governor of Rio Grande de Sul. On 5 November 1897, Carlos attended a military ceremony with President Prudente de Morais, where he was stabbed by Lance Corporal Marcelino Bispo de Melo and in a failed assassination attempt and died of his injures.

== Early life ==
Carlos was born in 1840 to Jacinto Machado de Bittencourt (1807–1869), a well-respected brigadier in the Brazilian Army, and Ana Maurícia da Silva.

== Military career ==
=== Paraguayan War ===
Carlos began his military career when he was 17-years-old, Carlos began to attend a military academy and chose cavalry as his career path. In the 1860s, he participated in the Paraguayan War and fought in the Battle of Tuyutí on 24 May 1866. By the war's conclusion in 1870, Carlos was a captain and became a general in 1873. In 1890, Carlos became a brigadier and later became the Governor of Rio Grande do Sul following the resignation of Francisco da Silva Tavares. In 1895, he became a marshal and on 17 May 1897, he became the Minister of War under President Prudente de Morais.

=== Canudos War ===
In August 1897, Bittencourt embarked to Bahia to fight the Canudos. where he quickly realized the expedition's major vulnerability: an inadequate supply structure. Faced with this situation, he took several measures: he dismissed suppliers, acquired products directly, organized convoys, negotiated prices, established supply posts, etc. Less than two months after his arrival, the army was victorious. During the war, Bittencourt engaged in various war crimes including: executions of Canudos POWs, murdering innocent women and children, slaughtered actively surrendering soldiers waving a white flag and beheaded several sleeping POWs in Monte Santo.

== Death ==
On 5 November 1897, while attending a military ceremony with President Morais in honor of Brazil's victory over Canudos, Marcelino Bispo de Melo, a lance corporal, approached President Morais and pointed a double-barreled pistol and attempted to shoot the president. However, the gun jammed and Marcelino was grabbed by Bittencourt and Colonel Luiz Mendes de Moraes. Marcelino produced a dagger and fatally stabbed Bittencourt and wounded Moraes.

Bittencourt became known as the "Golden Marshal" (Marechal de Ouro in Portuguese).
