= Prudente de Morais =

President of Brazil from 1894 to 1898

His Excellency Prudente de Morais
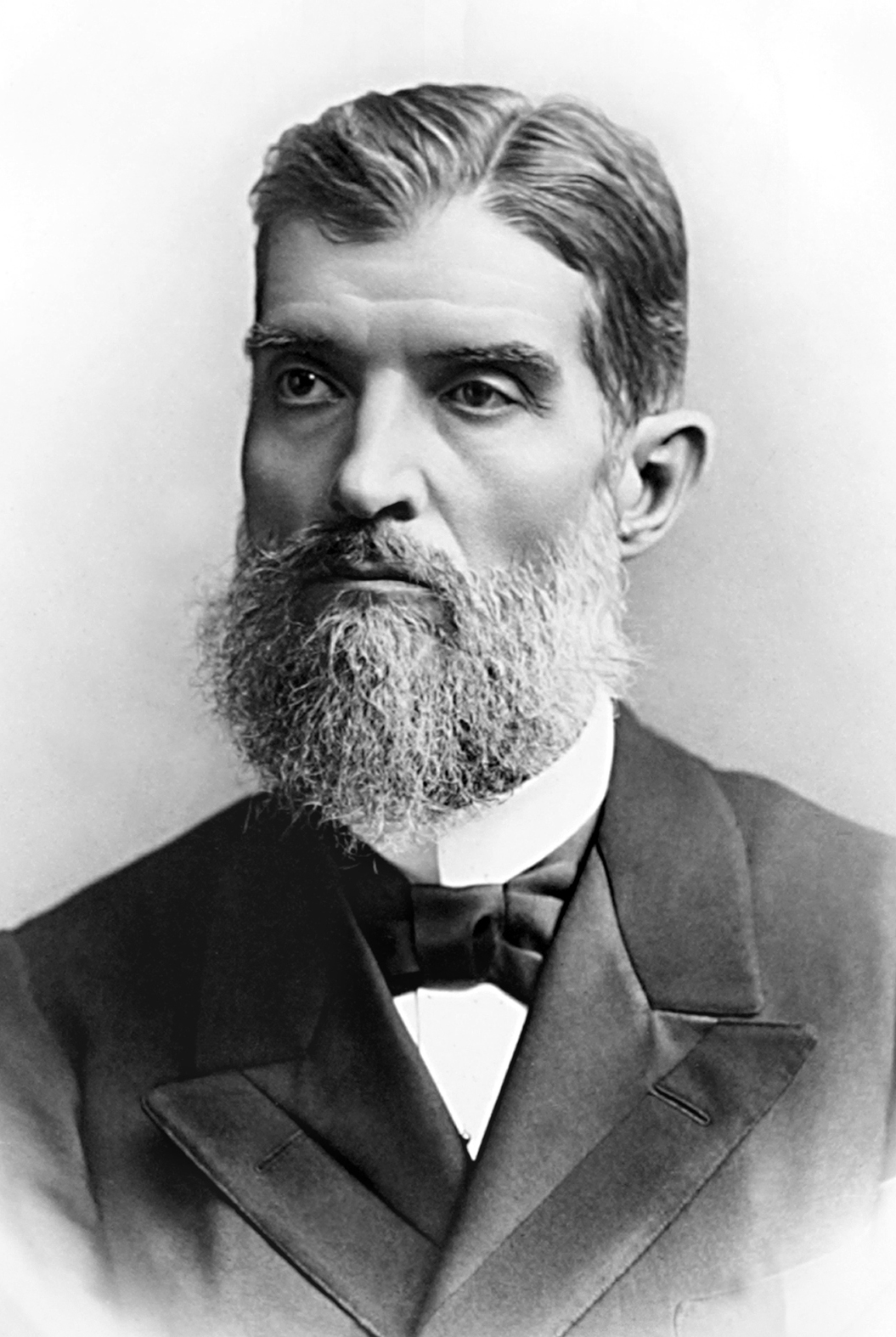
- Official portrait, 1894

3rd President of Brazil
- In office 15 November 1894 – 15 November 1898; Leave of absence 10 November 1896 – 3 March 1897
- Vice President: Manuel Vitorino
- Preceded by: Floriano Peixoto
- Succeeded by: Campos Sales

Vice President of the Federal Senate
- In office 19 June 1891 – 9 May 1894
- Preceded by: Brás Carneiro
- Succeeded by: Ubaldino do Amaral

President of the Constituent Assembly
- In office 21 November 1890 – 24 February 1891
- Preceded by: Silva Coutinho (1823)
- Succeeded by: Antônio Carlos (1934)
Executive offices
President of São Paulo
In office 14 December 1889 – 18 October 1890
Vice President	1. Francisco Glicério; 2. Luís Pereira Barreto
Preceded by	Governing Junta (acting)
Succeeded by	Jorge Tibiriçá
Member of the São Paulo Governing Junta
In office 16 November 1889 – 14 December 1889 Serving with Francisco Rangel Pestana, Joaquim de Sousa Mursa
Preceded by	Couto de Magalhães (as President)
Succeeded by	Himself (as President)
Legislative offices
1890–1894	Senator
1885–1886	General Deputy
1881–1882	Provincial Deputy
1878–1879	Provincial Deputy
1868–1869	Provincial Deputy

Personal details
- Born: 4 October 1841 Itu, São Paulo, Empire of Brazil
- Died: 3 December 1902 (aged 61) Piracicaba, São Paulo, Brazil
- Party: Liberal (until 1873); PRP (1873–1893); PRF (1893–1902)
- Spouse: Adelaide de Morais Barros (m. 1866)
- Education: Faculty of Law of São Paulo (LL.B.)

Prudente José de Morais Barros (Note: Portuguese pronunciation: [pɾuˈdẽtʃi ʒoˈzɛ dʒi moˈɾajz i ˈbaʁus].) (4 October 1841 – 3 December 1902) was a Brazilian lawyer and politician who served as the third president of Brazil from 1894 to 1898. Morais was elected in 1894, being the first civilian president of the country, the first to be elected by direct popular ballot under the permanent provisions of Brazil's 1891 Constitution, and the first to serve a full term. Before his presidency he served as president (governor) of the state of São Paulo and president of the Senate from 1891 to 1894. He was also president of the Constituent Assembly that drafted and enacted the 1891 Constitution.

Morais was born in Itu, São Paulo, in 1841. His father, José Marcelino de Barros, was murdered by a slave when Prudente was three years old. Raised in Piracicaba after his mother's remarriage to major Caetano José Gomes Carneiro, Morais graduated from the Faculty of Law of São Paulo in 1863. Returning to Piracicaba, he established a law firm and soon joined the Liberal Party, serving as a municipal councilor and later as provincial deputy. In the 1870s he joined the Republican cause, taking part in the foundation of the Republican Party of São Paulo and becoming one of the most prominent leaders of the republican propaganda in São Paulo. In 1866, he married Adelaide Benvinda da Silva Gordo, with whom he had seven children, including Prudente de Morais Filho, who later became a politician. After the fall of the monarchy, Morais was part of the governing junta of São Paulo and was then appointed governor of the state. In 1890 he became senator, and the following year presided over the Constituent Assembly that promulgated Brazil's first republican Constitution, which instituted a federal system.

Elected president of Brazil in 1894, Morais took office in a climate of severe political instability following the country's first military presidencies, marked by the 1894 Naval Revolt in the capital and the Federalist Revolution in southern Brazil, which ended in the first year of his term. His government also faced the War of Canudos, a peasant revolt in Bahia's hinterland crushed by the Brazilian Army in 1897, and an assassination attempt that same year. On the international front, his administration restored diplomatic relations with Portugal after mediation by Queen Victoria, settled disputes with Italy and France in Amapá, signed a treaty with Japan to encourage immigration, and resolved a border dispute with Argentina through arbitration by U.S. president Grover Cleveland, which was favorable to Brazil. He also dealt with the financial aftermath of the Encilhamento by negotiating the first funding loan with British bankers. After completing his term, Morais returned to Piracicaba, where he remained active in politics until his death in 1902.

== Early life ==
=== Education ===
Born on 4 October 1841 in Itu, São Paulo Province, Prudente José de Morais Barros was the son of José Marcelino de Barros and Catarina Maria de Morais. At the age of three he lost his father, who was murdered by a slave at the family's estate known as Moinho. The perpetrator was later sentenced to death by a jury, in what became the last execution carried out in that district. His mother then married major Caetano José Gomes Carneiro, described as a man of "routine and backward spirit", and the family moved to Piracicaba.

After receiving his first schooling from his mother, Morais enrolled in 1855 at the Delgado School at the age of 14, newly founded in Itu by the educator Manoel Estanislau Delgado, but the institution closed the following year. Morais aspired to move to São Paulo, where he could take preparatory courses for the Faculty of Law, but his stepfather was against his decision, despite the expenses being covered by the inheritance left by his father. With the help of his mother, Morais was able to move to the provincial capital in April 1857, where he enrolled at João Carlos da Fonseca's school. There he studied under notable professors José Vieira Couto de Magalhães and João Baptista Cortines Laxe. In November 1858 he took his last preparatory exams and in 1859 he enrolled in the Faculty of Law.

During his studies at the Faculty of Law, Morais was a colleague of Campos Sales, Bernardino de Campos, Rangel Pestana, and Francisco Quirino dos Santos. Like many other leaders of Brazil's early republican period, in the faculty Morais joined the Bucha, a secret student society of a liberal, abolitionist, and republican nature founded by professor Julius Frank and inspired by the German Burschenschaft associations. Morais graduated with a Legal and Social Sciences degree in 1863 and returned to Piracicaba the following year, where he opened a law firm and began to work as an attorney.

=== Marriage and family ===
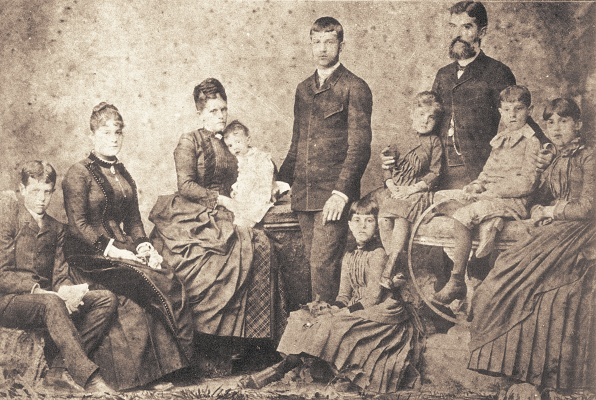
The Morais Family, from left to right: Prudente Filho, Maria Amélia, Adelaide (wife), Paula, Gustavo, Carlota, Maria Teresa, Prudente, Antônio and Julia, c. 1875

Prudente de Morais married Adelaide Benvinda da Silva Gordo on 18 May 1866 in Santos. Adelaide was the daughter of Antônio José da Silva Gordo. Morais' older brother, Manuel de Morais Barros, was already married to Adelaide's sister, Maria Inês. Adelaide's younger brother, Adolfo Afonso da Silva Gordo, was also active in politics and married first Ana, the granddaughter of senator Nicolau Vergueiro, and later Albertina Vieira de Carvalho, daughter of jurist Joaquim José Vieira de Carvalho and sister of Arnaldo Vieira de Carvalho, founder of the Faculty of Medicine of São Paulo.

Together Prudente and Adelaide had seven children, including Gustavo de Morais e Barros and Prudente José de Morais e Barros Filho, both of whom enlisted as volunteers during the Federalist Revolt, marching to Itararé to defend it against the rebels. Several members of the extended Morais family later held political office, such as his son Prudente Filho, his relative Paulo de Morais Barros, and his son-in-law João Sampaio.

== Political rise ==
=== Municipal councillor and provincial deputy (1865–1868) ===
Prudente de Morais joined the Liberal Party and was elected president of the Municipal Chamber of Piracicaba on 7 September 1864 for the 1865–1868 period. In this office he enacted the municipality's first Manners Code. (Note: The Manners Codes were a set of municipal regulations issued by local councils in nineteenth-century Brazil. These codes functioned as instruments of administrative police, laying down rules to organize urban life and maintain public order. They typically addressed matters such as street cleaning, sanitation, building standards, the use of public spaces, trade practices, and even norms of public behavior, Limeira & Miranda 2022, pp. 5–6.) In October 1867 Morais was elected provincial deputy in the 3rd district to the 1868–1869 legislature in São Paulo, being appointed a member of the Provincial Assembly's Justice and Legislation Commission. On the national political scene, the liberal prime minister Zacarias de Góis e Vasconcelos fell on 16 July 1868, being succeeded by the conservative Joaquim José Rodriges Torres, who dissolved the Chamber of Deputies.

The new elections for councilors and deputies that followed, scheduled for September 1868 and January 1869, respectively, were marked by political violence in São Paulo and other provinces. Liberals all over the country decided not to take part in the January elections, and in São Paulo the legislature met to discuss the wave of violence and persecution carried out by the provincial president, the Baron of Itaúna, directly appointed by the imperial government. In a session held on 31 May 1869 to discuss the bill establishing the police force, Prudente de Morais delivered a lengthy speech denouncing political persecution. According to Manoel Antonio Alvares de Azevedo, the speech already revealed Morais' disbelief in Brazil's monarchical institutions and his republican leanings.

=== The Convention of Itu and foundation of the Republican Party ===
The country was then experiencing the beginning of republican unrest and on 3 December 1870, the Republican Manifesto was launched in Rio de Janeiro. Published in the first issue of the newspaper A República and signed by 56 people, including the São Paulo natives Rangel Pestana and Miranda de Azevedo, the document had repercussions in São Paulo, proposing a "peaceful evolution" in Brazil to make the country a republic by non violent means.

In 1873, he joined the Republican Party of São Paulo (PRP) and declared himself a republican as a representative in the Provincial Assembly.

He was a provincial deputy in the city of São Paulo and deputy to the General Assembly of the Empire as a supporter of the republican form of government, abolition of slavery and federalism. As provincial deputy, he worked with the complex issue of the borders of São Paulo with Minas Gerais, a subject on which he was an expert.

After the proclamation of the Republic in 1889, his Party began to dominate national politics, and Morais was elected to the Constituent Congress as Senator for São Paulo. Due to his leading position in the Party, he was chosen by his peers as President of the Constituent Congress, that promulgated the Brazil's first republican Constitution in 1891.

Morais ran in the first Brazilian presidential election (conducted by the Constituent Congress after the promulgation of the Constitution and in accordance with its transitional provisions), but lost to incumbent head of the Provisional Government Deodoro da Fonseca. After that election and the inauguration of the first president and vice-president, the Congress's function as a Constituent Assembly ceased, and it became an ordinary bicameral National Congress, whereupon Morais' role as president of the Constituent Congress ended. Senator Prudente de Morais was then elected vice-president of the Federal Senate, the legislature's upper house. The presidency of the Senate was vested by the Constitution in the vice-president of the Republic. In November 1891 however, President Deodoro da Fonseca attempted to dissolve Congress and rule as a dictator, but after a few weeks he was forced to resign the presidency due to the First Revolt of the Navy; Vice-President Floriano Peixoto then succeeded to the presidency of the Republic, and the vice-presidency became vacant and remained so until the next presidential election, in 1894. As a consequence, Morais, who until then was vice-president of the Senate, succeeded Peixoto as president of the Senate on 23 November 1891.

== Presidential election of 1894 ==
In the contest for the succession of Floriano Peixoto, Morais was nominated by the Federal Republican Party (PRF), founded by Francisco Glicério in 1893. He won the presidential election on 1 March 1894 and took office on 15 November that year, becoming the first president of Brazil to be elected by direct vote and the first civilian president of Brazil. Prudente gleaned 276,583 votes against 38,291 for his main competitor, Afonso Pena. The election had more than 29 politicians polled. His vice-president was Dr. Manuel Vitorino Pereira. His election marked the coming to power of the coffee oligarchy of São Paulo (the "paulista oligarchy") in place of the military.

== Presidency (1894–1898) ==
=== Domestic policy ===
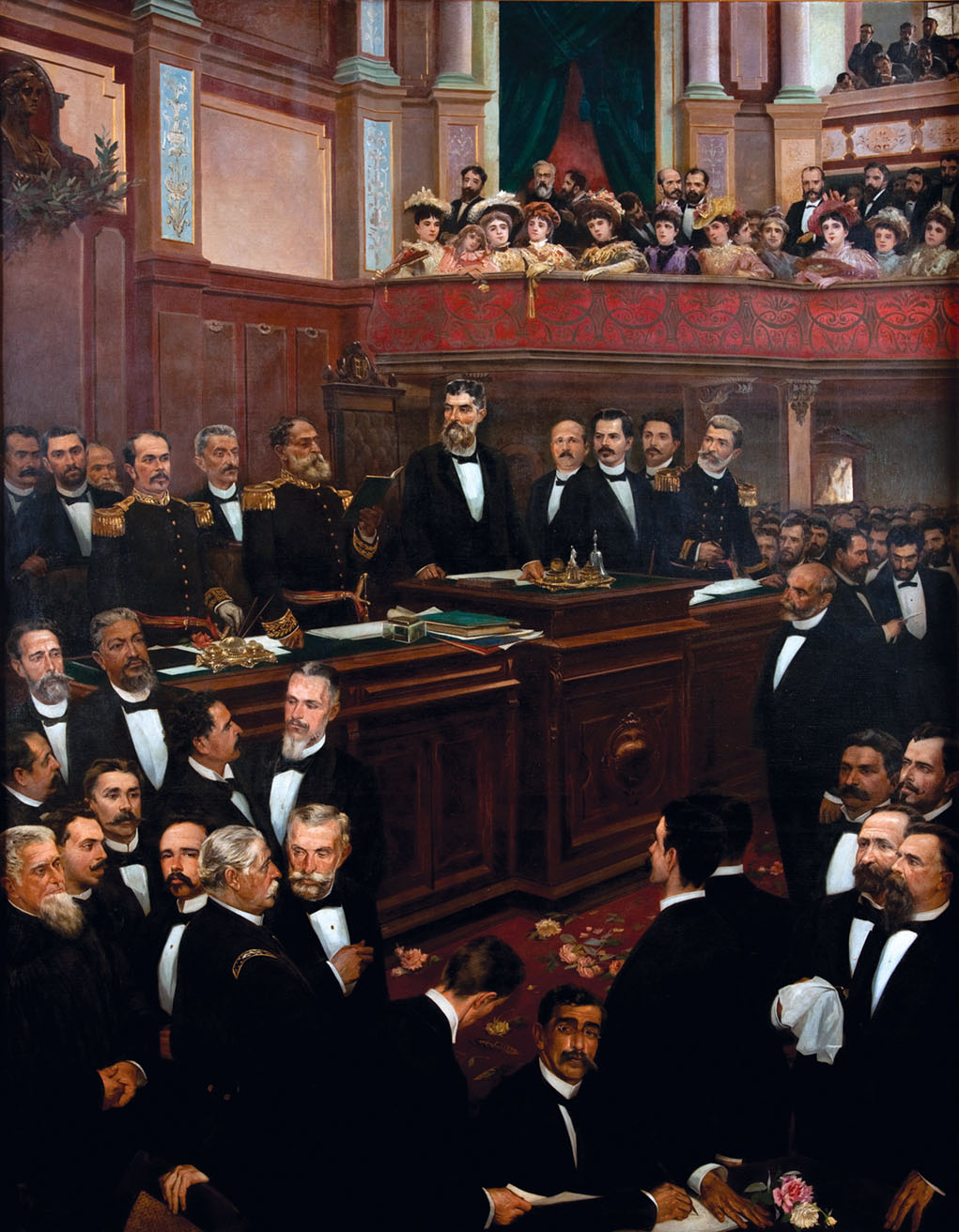
Prudente de Morais (center) as President of the Constituent Congress, presides over the swearing-in of Deodoro da Fonseca as first President of the Republic and of Floriano Peixoto as Vice-President on 26 February 1891, painting by Aurélio de Figueiredo (Republic Museum, Rio de Janeiro).

The four-year government of Prudente de Morais was shaken both by partisan political issues and continued fighting in Rio Grande do Sul, the center of the Federalist Revolt (1893–1895). Early in his government, he was able to resolve the latter difficulty by signing a peace treaty with the rebels, who received amnesty.

Later, Prudente de Morais devoted all of his efforts to pacify the policial factions within his country, which included extreme advocates of the centralist policies of Floriano Peixoto and supporters of the monarchy. During his rule, he abandoned the innovative measures of Floriano Peixoto one by one. A gradual approach was necessary since the Florianists still had some influence, particularly in the army, and the vice-president was connected to the ideas of the Florianists.

Shortly after the rebel movement in Rio Grande do Sul, Prudente faced an even greater challenge: the War of Canudos in the interior of Bahia.

Forced to undergo surgery, Prudente de Morais retired from power between 10 November 1896 and 4 March 1897, turning over his responsibilities to vice president Vitorino. During this interim, Vitorino transferred the seat of government from Itamaraty Palace to the Catete Palace.

With the early rebel victories of Antônio Conselheiro in the War of Canudos, the political situation further deteriorated. Morais interrupted his convalescence and then appointed Minister of War general Carlos Machado de Bittencourt to lead a new expedition to defeat the rebels.

Internal disputes within the PRF and the War of Canudos wore down the government. Even with the victory of the government troops in the war, tensions did not abate. On 5 November 1897, during a military ceremony, Morais withstood an assassination attempt. He escaped unharmed, but war minister Bittencourt died defending him. The president decreed a state of emergency in the Federal District in order to get rid of his most troublesome opponents.

The difficult economic and financial crisis inherited from the Encilhamento economic bubble took its toll on the administration, mainly because of military spending and increased debt to foreign creditors.

With the advice of his ministers of finance, Rodrigues Alves and Bernardino de Campos, Morais negotiated with British bankers to consolidate debt in a financial transaction known as the funding loan, based on the policy implemented by Joaquim Murtinho within four years.

=== Foreign policy ===
In foreign policy, in 1896 Morais faced a diplomatic issue involving the British, who took possession of the islands of Trindade and Martim Vaz in 1895, and the revolt of the Military School. He asserted his authority by closing the school and military club. The diplomatic issue was resolved favorably in favor of Brazil.

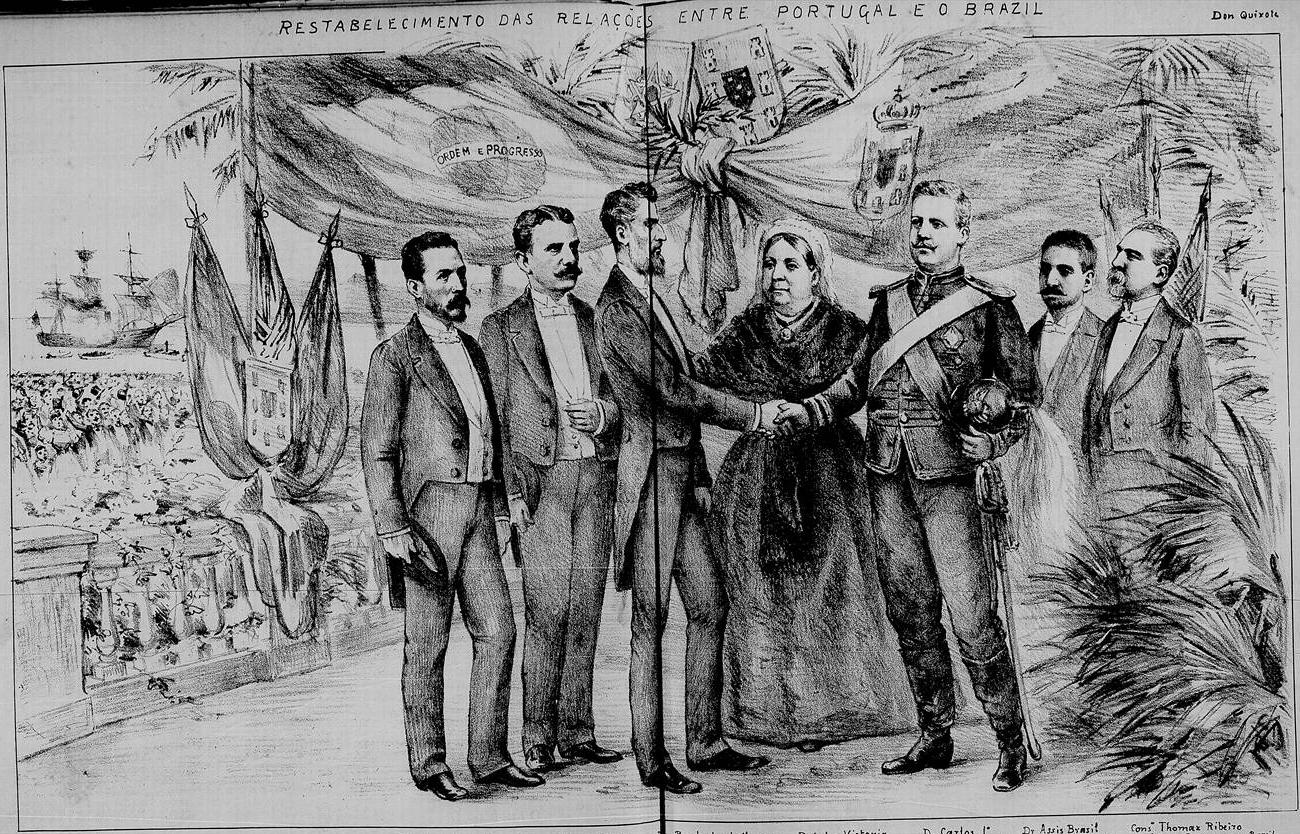
President Morais shakes hands with King Carlos I of Portugal during the re-establishment of diplomatic relations between Brazil and Portugal after talks mediated by Queen Victoria, 16 March 1895.

Prudente de Morais re-established relations with Portugal and signed a Treaty of Friendship with Japan in November 1895 with the aim of encouraging the arrival of Japanese immigrants.

A boundary dispute with Argentina arbitrated by U.S. President Grover Cleveland was resolved in favor of Brazil. Historians ascribe that diplomatic success to the efforts and diligence of the Brazilian Government's representative, the Baron of Rio Branco, appointed by Morais to lead the Brazilian delegation in the arbitration process.

== Legacy ==
The city of Presidente Prudente, located in the western part of the state of São Paulo, is named after him.

== Notes ==
Political offices
Preceded by Floriano Peixoto	President of Brazil; 1894–1898	Succeeded by Campos Sales
Government offices
Preceded by None	Governor of the State of São Paulo; 1889–1890	Succeeded by Jorge Tibiriça Piratininga
