= 1923 federal intervention in Rio de Janeiro =

Brazilian political crisis

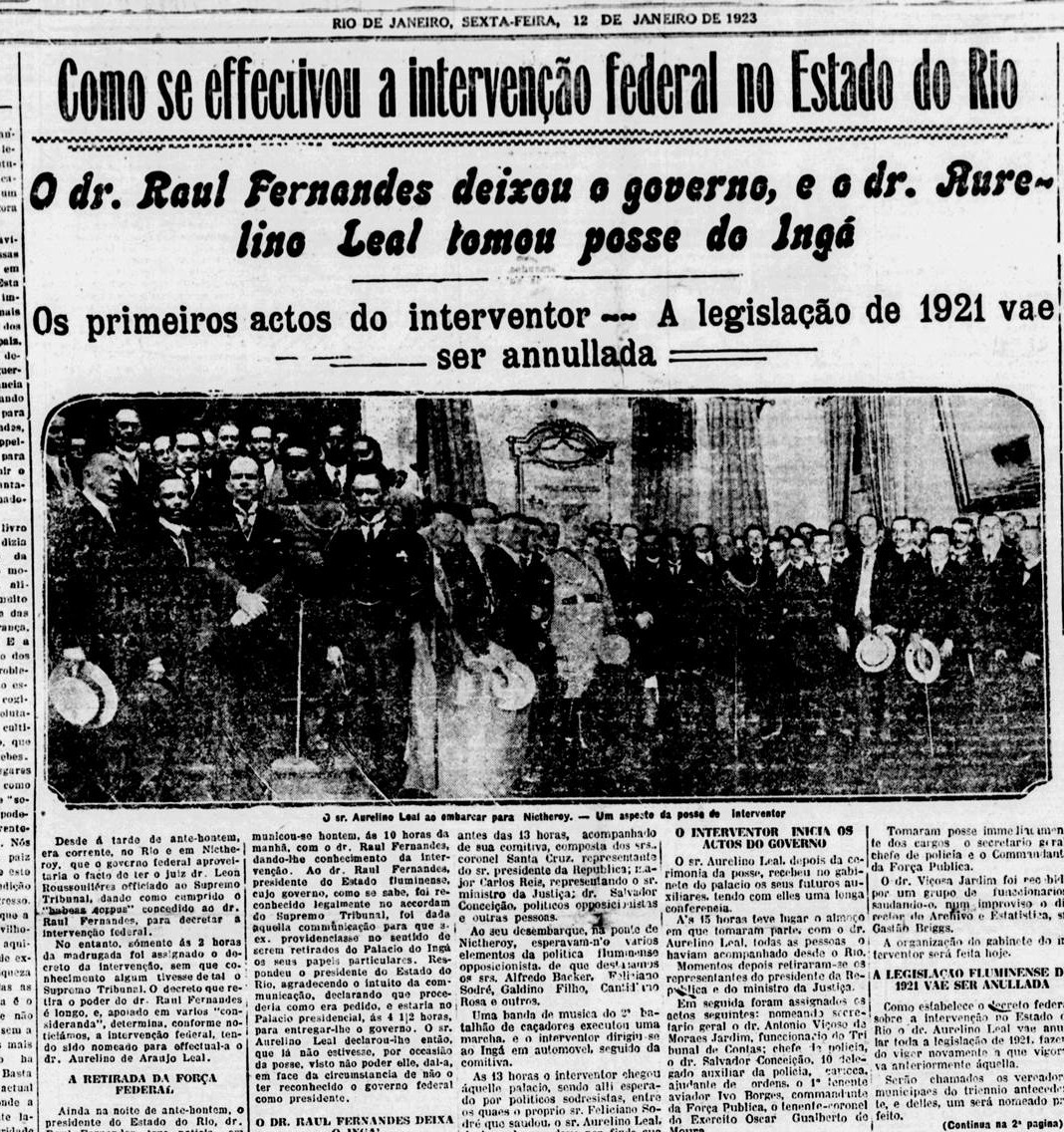
- Report from O Brasil on the inauguration of Aurelino Leal
- Date formed: 10 January 1923
- Date dissolved: 23 December 1923
- President: Artur Bernardes
- Federal interventor: Aurelino Leal

Federal intervention in Rio de Janeiro was decreed by Brazilian president Artur Bernardes on 10 January 1923, installing Aurelino Leal as the federal interventor at the head of the state's Executive branch. State president (governor) Raul Fernandes, sworn in on 31 December 1922 at the Ingá Palace, in Niterói, was being challenged by a parallel government led by Feliciano Sodré. Aurelino Leal called for new elections, in which the only candidate was Feliciano Sodré, who took over the government on 23 December 1923. During his administration, Leal dismantled the political machine of Nilo Peçanha's "Nilist" faction, the main force in Rio de Janeiro state politics in the previous two decades.

Peçanha had been an enemy of Bernardes since both ran in the turbulent 1922 presidential election. In June 1922, Sodré lost the state election to Nilist Raul Fernandes and the opposition deputies, prevented from entering the Legislative Assembly by the State Police Force, denounced the elections as irregular and organized a parallel assembly. The opposition did not control the public political machine nor the state's budget, but it counted on the strong arm of the federal government — the same one that Peçanha used against his opponents in Rio de Janeiro in 1910 and 1914. The possibility of a federal intervention hovered over Nilism for months, attracting attention in the press, against the backdrop of the state of emergency in force since the Copacabana Fort revolt.

Raul Fernandes took office as governor guaranteed by a writ of habeas corpus from the Supreme Federal Court (STF), with security provided by the Brazilian Army. Once in power, Fernandes was boycotted by the federal government. Violence spread throughout the state's countryside, in which oppositionists and police officers from the Federal District removed mayors, city councillors and other authorities, installing municipal governments loyal to Feliciano Sodré. The army did nothing for the municipal authorities and prevented the Police Force from being sent to the countryside. Bernardes convinced STF president Hermínio Francisco do Espírito Santo that the writ of habeas corpus had already been fulfilled. On 9 January, the Police Force rejected Raul Fernandes' authority.

The intervention decrees were justified based on the duality of state governments and the disorder in the countryside. The decrees diverged from the consolidated legal practice of federal intervention in Brazil until then, as they were enacted during parliamentary recess, without being requested by the state government, and investing the federal interventor with the same powers as the state president — including the appointment of public officials without connection to the Nilist machine. The measure transformed the state of Rio de Janeiro into an ally of the federal government, alongside the other dissident states in the 1922 election, Rio Grande do Sul and Bahia, which also faced crises resolved in favor of Artur Bernardes. Politicians and jurists supported the measure, despite criticism that it disregarded the STF's habeas corpus. In the long term, criticism prevailed that the crises in Rio de Janeiro, Rio Grande do Sul and Bahia were engineered by president Bernardes to take revenge on his opponents.

== Background ==
=== Nilo Peçanha's Rio de Janeiro ===
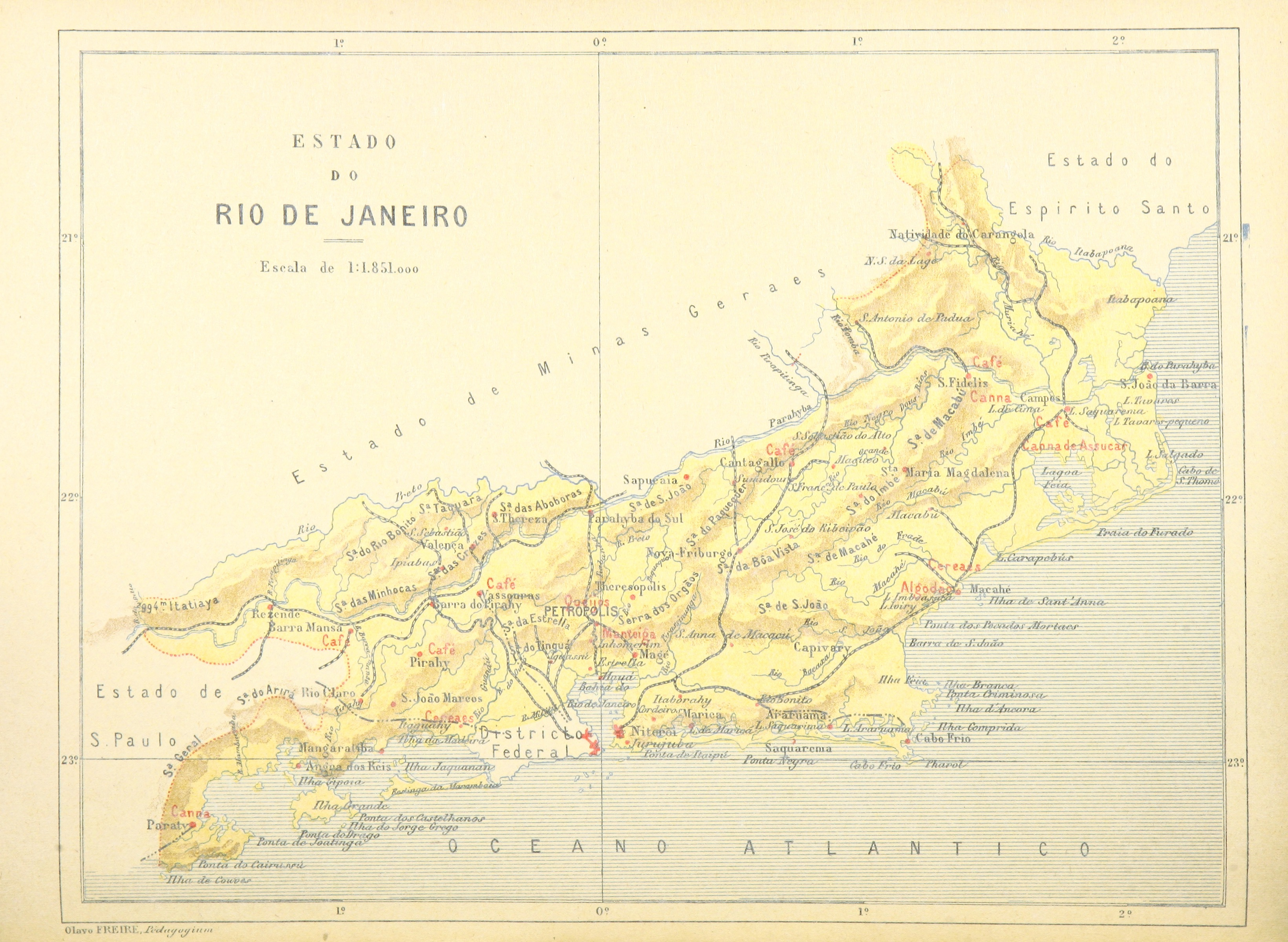
Map of the state of Rio de Janeiro in 1895

The state of Rio de Janeiro had its capital in Niterói and 48 municipalities in 1922. In turn, the city of Rio de Janeiro was not part of the state and was administered as the Federal District, but its proximity meant constant federal involvement in Rio de Janeiro state affairs. During the Second Reign, the "Old Province" of Rio became the country's main political force, but its coffee-based prosperity went into decline in the 1880s. Its economy and number of Congress members were still sufficient to rank it as a second-tier power in the First Brazilian Republic, inferior to São Paulo, Minas Gerais and Rio Grande do Sul. These states had cohesive dominant parties, unlike Rio de Janeiro's constant internal political struggles.

The dominant current in Rio de Janeiro politics, since the beginning of the 20th century, was Nilo Peçanha's "Nilism", referred to as "the most important political force that emerged in the State of Rio during the First Republic". Peçanha, who served as president of Brazil from 1909 to 1910, aimed to increase the national projection of his state. The Nilist political machine used typical instruments of coronelism, such as political persecution and electoral fraud, at the same time that Peçanha expressed an innovative discourse in national politics, appealing to the urban strata.

As President of Brazil, in 1910, there were dual Legislative Assemblies in Rio de Janeiro, one status quo and the other oppositionist. Peçanha requested federal intervention and militarily occupied the state to overthrow Alfredo Backer's dissent and install his candidate for president of the state (governor), Oliveira Botelho. In 1914, Peçanha personally ran against Feliciano Sodré and requested a writ of habeas corpus from the Supreme Federal Court (STF) to take office. There was a new duality of assemblies and also a duality of state governments. The opposition requested federal intervention, but Peçanha triumphed with a military occupation ordered by president Venceslau Brás. Rio police officers invaded the homes of Peçanha's opponents in Niterói and destroyed newspapers in Campos. The following years were of internal stability and good relations with the federal government. The state president in 1922, Raul Veiga, was one of Peçanha's most faithful allies.

=== Presidential election of 1922 ===
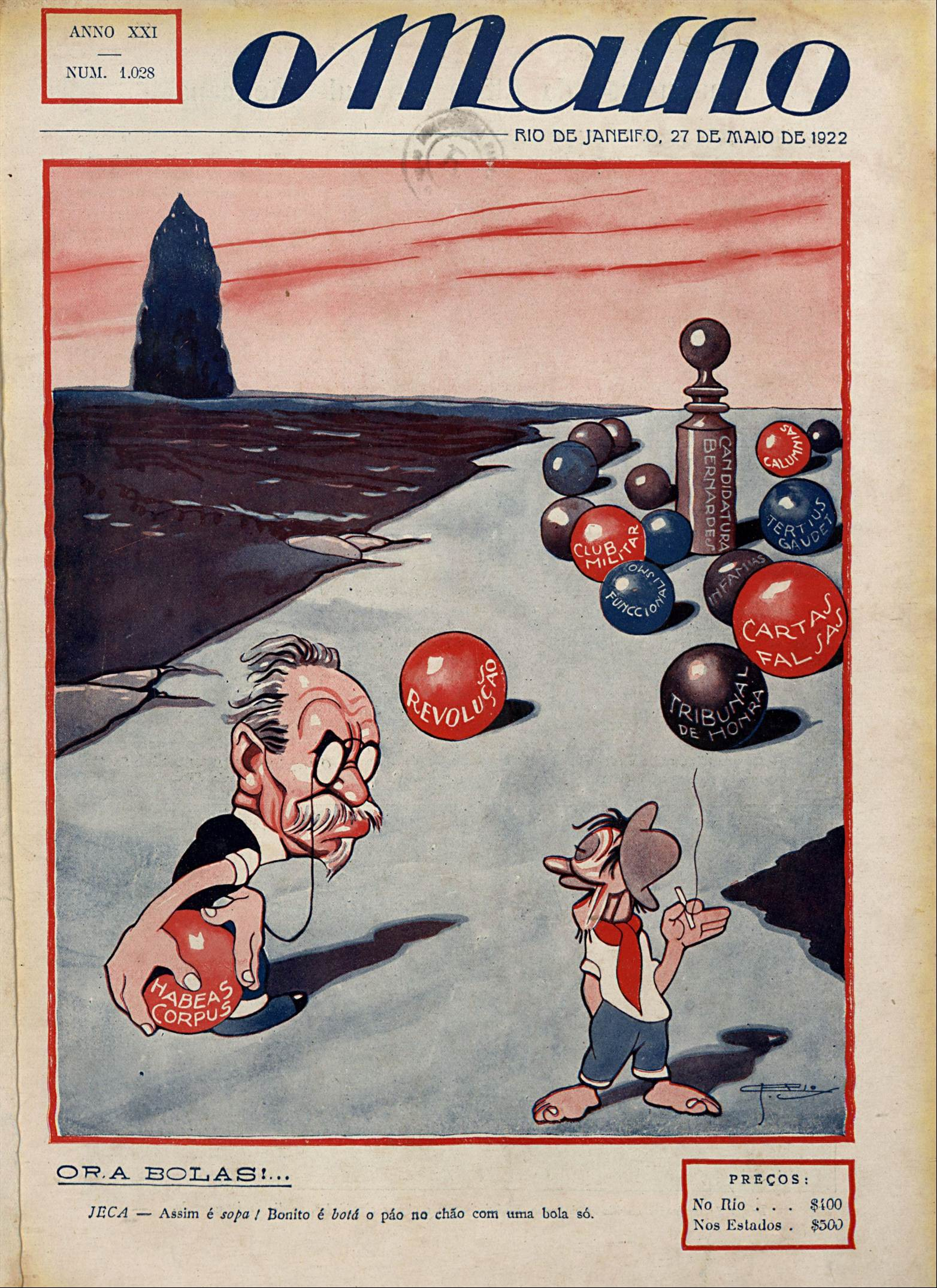
O Malho magazine, May 1922: Nilo Peçanha fails in every way to defeat Bernardes' candidacy

State representatives met in June 1921 to define the status quo candidate for president of Brazil in the 1922 election. Almost all states, especially São Paulo and Minas Gerais, ratified the name of Artur Bernardes. Only Rio de Janeiro, Rio Grande do Sul, Bahia and Pernambuco did not send representatives to the convention. Instead, they formed the Republican Reaction bloc and launched the candidacies of Nilo Peçanha for president and J. J. Seabra, from Bahia, for vice president. Peçanha's opponents in Rio, Backer and Sodré, formed the Rio de Janeiro Opposition Committee in order to support Bernardes.

The elections for the Legislative Assembly and Municipal Chambers, on 18 December, were won by the Nilists and the opposition protested against the legitimacy of the counting board. (Note: "The unsuccessful candidates pointed out as unconstitutional the following aspects of the Counting Board: (i) the Board being composed of judges, contrary to the provisions of article 75 of the state constitution, receiving undue special remuneration and; (ii) having been appointed by the state president, which thus would have interfered in the organization of the Legislative Branch, violating the principle of separation of powers" (Galvão 2013, p. 95). Theodoro de Almeida's habeas corpus request argued that the electoral defects began in the 1917 and 1918 reforms, "which would have exhibited constitutionality issues, with the aim of strengthening the internal political machine against the federal government" (Galvão 2013, p. 99).) The result of the dispute was linked to the presidential election, which was won by Bernardes in March 1922, after a fierce and hostile campaign. The Republican Reaction did not accept the results and tried to mobilize pressure from the masses and the military for arbitration of the electoral process. Military tempers flared on 5 July, in the Copacabana Fort revolt. The armed uprising was brief and the federal government promptly declared a state of emergency in the Federal District and the state of Rio de Janeiro, with favorable votes from Republican Reaction deputies. The revolt was not Peçanha's intention, but he contributed to the legal defense of the rebels in solidarity. Bernardes did not forgive him for that.

The state of emergency was suspended for 24 hours on 9 July for the elections for the state presidency and vice presidency and for municipal mayors. The future seemed threatened for Nilists. In the state election, status quo Raul Fernandes and Artur Leandro de Araújo Costa defeated the opposition ticket, Feliciano Sodré and Paulino de Sousa, and again the results were contested. In the municipalities, Nilism maintained control of most city governments, but lost the two most important ones, Niterói and Petrópolis. The opposition's political base was in the main urban centers, especially in the capital.

== Parallel governments ==
=== Dissident assembly ===
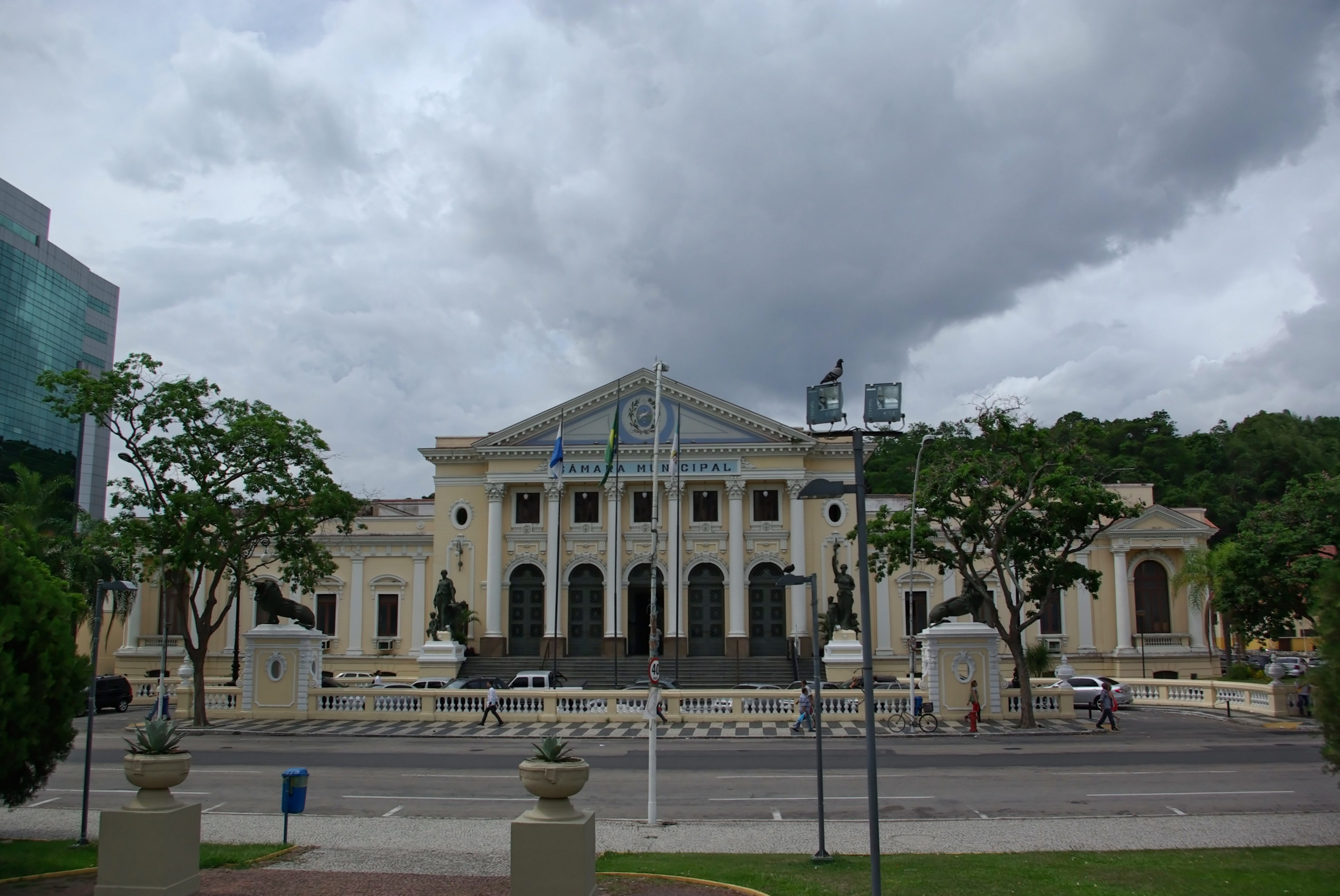
Former seat of the Legislative Assembly, current Niterói City Council

The state deputies elected in December 1921 would be sworn in by the Legislative Assembly on 17 July through a Powers Verification Commission appointed by the president of the previous legislature. This was the Nilist Artur Costa, who, as was customary in politics at the time, would only recognize Nilist candidates. Fearing riots, the state government deployed the Police Force around the assembly. Feliciano Sodré, Horácio de Magalhães and Manoel Duarte, at the head of the candidates' delegation, were physically prevented from climbing the stairs of the building.

The delegation went to the Niterói City Council session room, with the support of mayor Teixeira Leomil and allied councillors, and began legislative work on their own. Jornal do Commercio, from the Federal District, reported that a "huge popular mass" accompanied them. This was probably an exaggeration, as the newspaper was aligned with opponents of Nilism. The deputies filed a protest to federal judge Leon Roussolières, alleging the unconstitutionality of the electoral law applied in December 1921, and hence "the nullity of the inaugurations, and consequently, also the nullity of the laws, acts and resolutions by the gathering which, with the title of Legislative Assembly, result from the meeting of those inaugurated". But they did not request the annulment of the election of 31 December 1921 and considered themselves elected by that same election.

Two assemblies, one of Nilists, chaired by Artur Costa, and another of the opposition, chaired by Horácio Magalhães, now met sporadically. On the 28th the state of emergency was extended. The official gazette published only the laws enacted by Artur Costa's assembly and sanctioned by president Raul Veiga, while Jornal do Commercio published the decisions of both assemblies. Artur Costa's assembly legislated on administration, almost ignoring the existence of the parallel one, while Horácio Magalhães' assembly enacted few laws, mainly dealing with the territorial reorganization of the state. It needed to justify its existence and the budget and public machinery were beyond its control. There was no parallel investigative board to inaugurate these deputies, but only a complaint of illegality on the part of the established board.

=== Intervention expectations ===
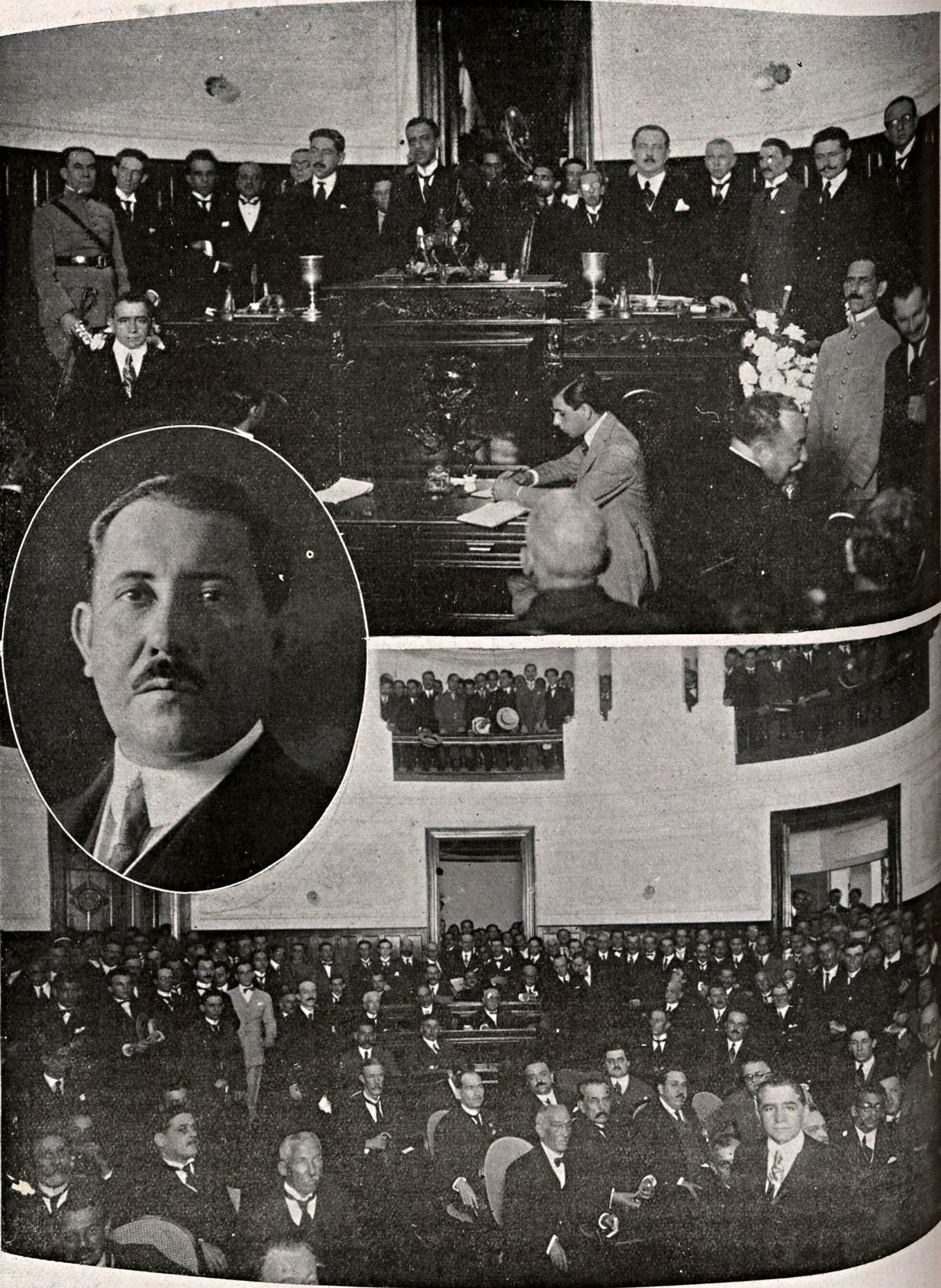
Feliciano Sodré's (pictured on the left) supporters convention in the Assembly in 1923

It was the assembly that certified the state president's inauguration. The opposition's strategy was obvious to the Nilists: move from duality of assemblies to duality of governments, and then request federal intervention, one of the only two ways for the opposition to reach state power in Brazil's First Republic system — the other was the state of emergency. Rio de Janeiro's status quo shielded the inauguration of Raul Fernandes, getting closer to federal status quo, supporting Estácio Coimbra's official candidacy for the vice presidency and planning deputy José Tolentino, who had good relations with the federal government, as the next president of the assembly. The siege tightened around them: the state of emergency remained in force and censorship even affected the speeches of members of the assembly. Arrests and lawsuits affected politicians and journalists from Rio de Janeiro. Peçanha himself was included in the police investigation, but was later acquitted of the accusation of involvement in the Copacaba Fort revolt.

In August, Bernardes wrote to Afrânio de Melo Franco: "how great is the mistake of our friends in the State of Rio, remaining divided, at this time, by disputes or personal rivalries". "I emphasized my freedom of action in the politics of that State, before our friends" — which could be understood as an intention not to intervene. There were ongoing negotiations. Senator Bernardo Pinto Monteiro, a friend of Bernardes and Peçanha, proposed the collective resignation of the president and vice president of the state and the majority of the Legislative Assembly and the holding of new elections with conciliation candidates. The president would be neutral, but trusted by Peçanha. He refused the agreement when Monteiro explained that the name had already been chosen, but he could not reveal it. According to Melo Franco, the other mediator of the proposal, Bernardes did not intend conciliation, as he wanted to exterminate Nilism. Bernardes personally respected Raul Fernandes, but could not tolerate his loyalty agenda to Peçanha.

When Bernardes took office as president of Brazil on 15 November, the imminent federal intervention was already polarizing national public opinion. Niterói's proximity to Rio's newspaper offices gave the crisis a lot of visibility. The opposition from Rio de Janeiro approached Bernardes, whose policy towards the former members of the Republican Reaction would be one of persecution. Raul Soares, president of Minas Gerais, sent a letter to Bernardes on 15 December, recommending that he issue an official note "in which he declares that he will not intervene to take the presidency away from Raul Fernandes". "Sodré is evidently defeated, any violence to put him in government would be indefensible and only through violence could he go". Intervention would be "an act of force that is repugnant to our legalistic spirit".

=== Double inauguration in the state Executive ===
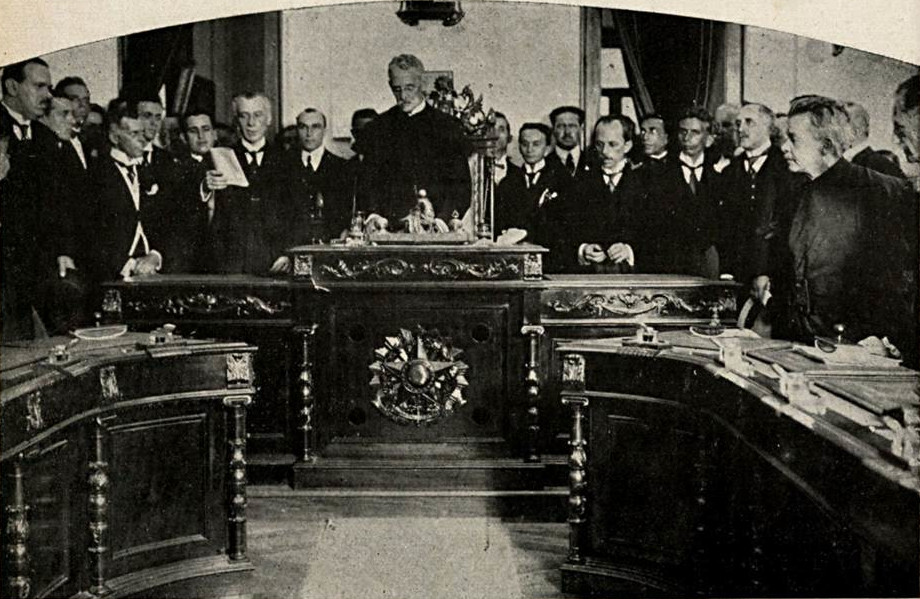

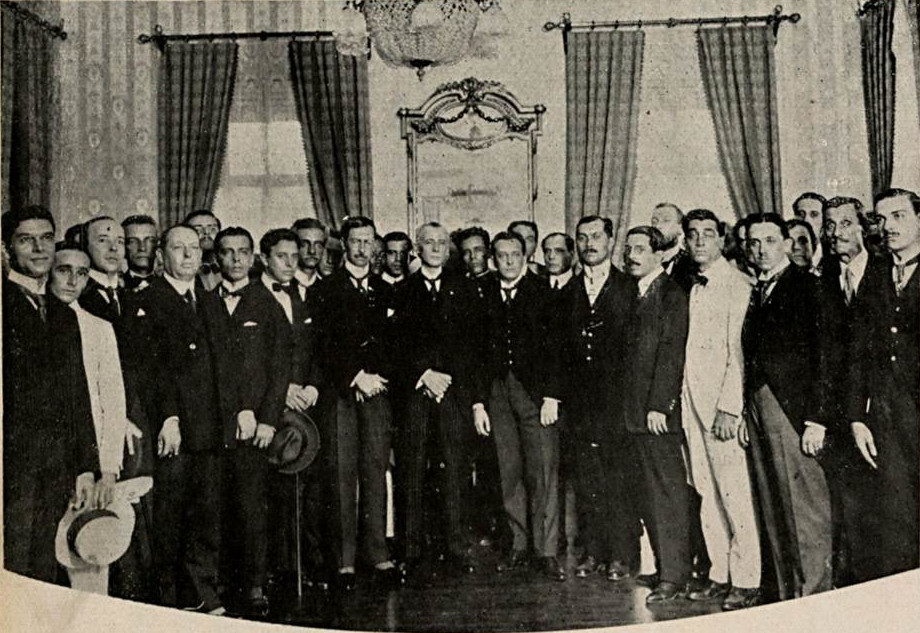
Inauguration of Raul Fernandes as president of Rio de Janeiro

The inauguration of the president and vice president of Rio de Janeiro at the Ingá Palace was scheduled for 31 December 1922. Raul Fernandes was already thinking about requesting a writ of habeas corpus when he was advised to first consult Artur Bernardes in person. The first interview was comforting, but a few days later, Bernardes warned Fernandes that he could not guarantee anything. On the 23rd, Levi Carneiro and Assis Chateaubriand wrote a petition for habeas corpus (number 8,800) to the Supreme Court in favor of the inauguration of Raul Fernandes and Artur Costa. The federal government had not recognized Artur Costa's assembly and threatened to "give a strong hand to the petitioners' political opponents, restricting their rights".

The petitioners would have no way of defending themselves: "the federal government still hoards, due to the continuation of the state of emergency, broad and unrestricted powers, with the state of emergency in force only in this capital and in the State of Rio itself; the Police Force of the State of Rio and all its companies is commanded by officers of the first line of the national army, designated by the then President of the Republic and immediately subordinate to the Federal Government, and who only receive direct orders from them."

Carneiro and Chateaubriand legitimized Artur Costa's assembly, as, among other contacts, it maintained relations with the federal ministers of Justice, War, Finance and Foreign Affairs and representatives of the governments of São Paulo, Paraná and Santa Catarina. They delegitimized Horácio Magalhães' assembly: "without inauguration certificates, without electoral books, through the very same elections in which the status quo candidates competed, they proclaimed themselves deputies, also called themselves the State Legislative Assembly, and began an obscure, remotely hopeful collective life, like that of those dethroned sovereigns".

Another habeas corpus petition, authored by lawyer Theodoro Figueira de Almeida, had already been sent to the STF on the 8th. Almeida argued that Rio de Janeiro's Executive and Legislative, were leaderless on both sides and thus the next in the line of succession, the president of the Court of Appeals, should take over. The STF denied the request due to lack of consent from the writ's beneficiary. Theodoro de Almeida's solution was neither Nilist nor Sodresist, but would prevent federal intervention.

Horácio Magalhães asked Bernardes for federal intervention, arguing that neither assembly had real inauguration certificates, but highlighting that his assembly worked regularly, having even certified the election of Feliciano Sodré, who asked them to guarantee his inauguration. The representations of both were forwarded by Bernardes to the National Congress on 24 December. Deputy Sales Filho speculated that the federal intervention had already been decided for the last day of the month, with Aurelino Leal or Carneiro da Fontoura as the federal interventor. Congress went into recess until May before deciding the issue, giving Bernardes freedom to resolve the issue as he saw fit. The state of emergency, which was due to expire after 31 December, was extended until April 1923.

By six votes against five, the STF granted the writ of habeas corpus on 27 December, despite protests from the Prosecutor General of the Republic, Pires de Albuquerque, for whom federal intervention was a political act and therefore within the jurisdiction of Congress and not of the Judiciary. Raul Veiga handed the government to Raul Fernandes on 31 December, guaranteed by the 2nd Battalion of Caçadores from the army. The following day, as per protocol, Fernandes telegraphed Bernardes thanking him for the security provided. Artur Bernardes thanked him back and informed him of another message from Feliciano Sodré, sworn in to the same position and on the same date.

=== State anarchy ===
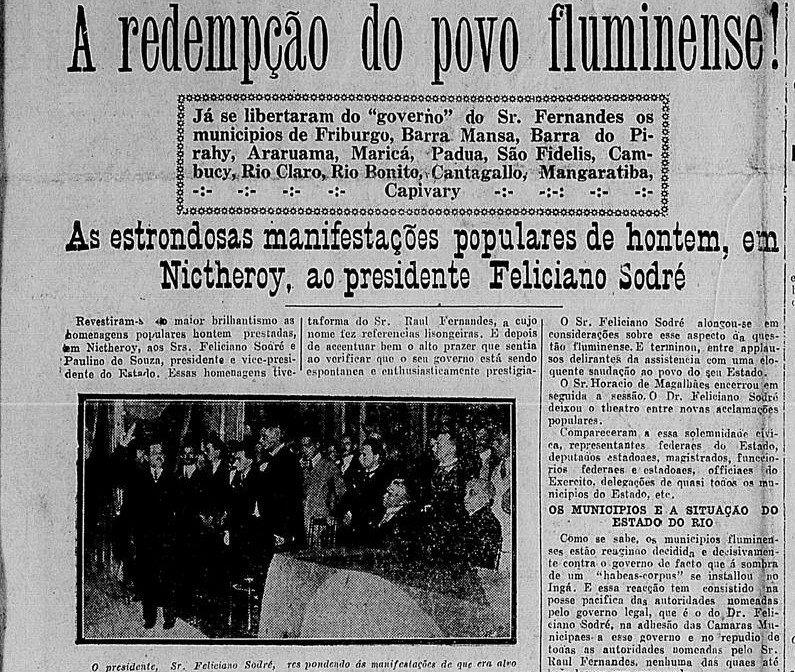
Clipping from the newspaper A Rua: the municipalities "free themselves" from Mr. Fernandes' government (in quotation marks)

Raul Fernandes took office, but was unable to govern. Claiming they were threatened, Sodré's supportes got involved in shootouts in the countryside. Mayors, city councillors and sometimes police chiefs, revenue collectors and civil registry officers were deposed and replaced by new office holders or left the municipalities without government. The Rio newspaper A Rua reported the installation of authorities loyal to the Feliciano Sodré government in Friburgo and Barra do Piraí, on 3 January. On the 6th, Maricá, Araruama, Barra Mansa and Cambuci joined the list; until the 8th, also Pádua, São Fidélis, Rio Claro, Rio Bonito, Cantagalo, Mangaratiba and Capivari. On the 9th, "twenty-one municipalities have already joined the Sodré government", including Petrópolis, Itaboraí, Teresópolis, Bom Jardim, Saquarema, Macaé, Cabo Frio and Madalena. Raul Fernandes wanted the support of the Judiciary so as not to fall into the trap of a violent confrontation, which would justify federal intervention, and therefore ordered the local authorities not to resist. Several companies and businessmen did not pay taxes, as they did not know which of the two governments to pay.

In the Sodresist version of the facts, those who deposed the authorities were the "respective populations", due to the "heat of passions", in a popular movement of "dignifying civics", according to Norival Freitas. The Nilists denounced federal involvement, with the support of police officers from the Federal District and army soldiers. The vast majority of telegrams from municipal authorities to Raul Fernandes reported the participation of federal agents, usually occupying the local police stations and prisons. Historians such as Hélio Silva, Marieta de Moraes Ferreira, and Edgard Carone (Note: Revoluções do Brasil contemporâneo (1922-1938), 3rd ed. (1977), p. 46, mentions that the "countryside mayors were deposed by Capt. Limoeiro's group".) support the participation of federal agents in the depositions.

In Barra Mansa, according to the police chief, police officers from the Federal District fired rifles and revolvers and the following day they forcibly took over the state collector's office and the registry office. In Macaé, some police authorities were reportedly detained in jail until their release by a judge. The mayor of that city described the violence:

a group of Federal District Police agents, arriving in this city by today's express [train], as soon as they disembarked, with weapons in hand, joined a group of major Feliciano Sodré's supporters and immediately attacked status quo friends who were close to the Leopoldina station, injuring a father and immediately attacking the public prison, where there was no resistance, as there was only two soldiers deployed. They arrested Dr. Miranda Filho, police chief of the 3rd police region, deputy Francisco Rodrigues Pinto and other authorities. Then, going to the City Hall building, which was closed and without any employee at the time, due to the panic established in the city, they broke into the city hall itself, taking documents, taking possession of the respective safe and committing the biggest mischiefs.

=== Federal boycott ===
Deputy Ramiro Braga, from Campos, reported on the bulletins delivered by the forces that overthrew the municipal authorities:

To the people! The apparent disturbance of order seen today is nothing more than the reconquest of our rights, criminally usurped by the exploiters of profitable positions. This reconquest is the affirmation that this great people does not deny its glorious traditions of greatness and dignity, which it has always revealed in carrying out its civic duties. Now that the necessary measures have been taken, we are in a hurry to recommend all moderation, all calm, ensuring that all families can rest assured, today more than ever, that the city's order will be kept unaltered. The public force, free from the excesses of provocative authorities and reinforced by the dedication of worthy and respected men, allows the certainty that absolutely nothing will disturb the life and tranquility of the city. Within a few hours a strong contingent of federal forces will arrive in this city to take over policing, under orders from the police chief.

At the request of Raul Fernandes, federal forces were sent to several municipalities and secured state collection officials in office. However, they did nothing to defend the mayors and councilors, as judge Roussoulières understood that the protection granted by habeas corpus only extended to delegates of state power. Justice Hermínio Francisco do Espírito Santo, president of the STF, called on Roussoulières to prevent municipal depositions and the "anarchy resulting from a de facto duality that is being established there and that would not have been possible if the ruling of this Court had been complied with". Shortly afterwards, he changed his mind and sent a telegram stating that habeas corpus had been fulfilled. According to minister Hermenegildo de Barros, the president of the STF revoked his previous order after a meeting with Artur Bernardes at the Catete Palace. Bernardes' Minister of Justice, João Luís Alves, declared that the federal Executive had done everything it could.

The federal attitude was one of boycott; according to Hélio Silva, "it was an unprecedented fact to isolate the State [Rio de Janeiro] from the Federation, making the exercise of administration impossible". The federal authorities did not correspond with the Raul Fernandes government. Postal and telegraphic correspondence was only delivered to members of the government when addressed by name. Payment of checks or postal orders issued by the countryside collection stations did not reach the state treasurer. Captain Cavalcanti, Raul Fernandes' military assistant, was arrested for three days on the orders of the Federal District police chief, marshal Carneiro da Fontoura. The Rio police seized and transferred two official Rio cars to the Sodré government.

Raul Fernandes tried to quell the riots with his Police Force. According to his and Ramiro Braga's reports, when he managed to gather loyal police officers (15 soldiers and one officer) for an operation in Friburgo, they were prevented from boarding at the train station by the army. With the authority granted by the state of emergency, the commander of the 2nd Battalion of Caçadores would have personally appeared at the police headquarters to prohibit the departure of detachments to the countryside, as "the commander of that army unit had considered that (...) as my Government needed support from the federal force to comply with habeas corpus, it should not deploy the state police". On 9 January the police retired to the barracks of the 2nd Battalion of Caçadores, refusing to obey the Fernandes government. A Rua celebrated: "the State police force joined the government of Mr. Feliciano Sodré". According to Julião de Castro, before this maneuver, the officers most loyal to Nilism were called to testify in a police investigation, facilitating the co-optation of the rest of them.

== Intervention ==
=== Presidential decrees ===
At 11:00 on 10 January, ill and bedridden, Artur Bernardes signed Decrees No. 15,922, for federal intervention in Rio de Janeiro, and No. 15,923, instructing the interventor. Aurelino Leal would assume the state Executive as interventor, replacing Raul Fernandes. A renowned law professor and lawyer, he was the one who drafted the outline of the decrees. The Minister of Justice cut some of the items. Leal was a former police chief in the Venceslau Brás administration (1914–1918), when he repressed the strike movements of the late decade, head of the pro-Bernardes electoral campaign in Bahia and until then uninvolved in Rio de Janeiro politics. His contacts with Nilism were greater than with the opposition; he had been a lawyer at the firm Guinle & Irmão, together with Raul Fernandes, and worked with Nilo Peçanha in the Venceslau Brás government. It is likely that his name was Bernardes' personal choice and not that of the Rio de Janeiro opposition. As a constitutionalist, he considered the intervention correct. He was a weighty name, but was still received with "flagrant outrage" in Rio de Janeiro, according to his biographer Hamilton Leal.

Decree 15,922 justified itself by stating: "the State of Rio currently has two governments, each considering itself legitimately invested", a case of "deformation or subversion of the federal republican form". The result was "a permanent state of disorder," "without either of the would-be presidents being able to assert their authority, which requires action by the Union to achieve public peace and tranquility". This referred to Article 6 of the Constitution: "the federal government may not intervene in matters peculiar to the states, except:" "2) to maintain the federal republican form", and "3) to restore order and tranquility in the States, at the request of the respective governments". The decree argued that "this request cannot occur due to the non-existence of the local government", an exception to consolidated jurisprudence. This also determined that an intervention based on item 2 would have to originate from the Legislature. The decree justified this by saying that Congress was not in session and the situation was serious.

The decree of instructions gave the interventor powers equal to those of a state president, contradicting the established interpretation that a federal interventor would have minimal powers. Article 4 established:

The appointed interventor will replace the normal State Government in all matters, and may:

- No. 1: fill vacant positions, in accordance with local laws;
- No. 2: remove any State employees from their respective positions if they do not merit his trust, appointing others to replace them, and may, for this purpose, but in both cases only for appointive offices, resort to persons outside the local civil service;
- No. 3: adopt rigorous measures regarding the collection of State revenues;
- No. 4: provide for public expenses in accordance with the State budget;
- No. 5: exercise supreme inspection, through the Chief of Police whom he appoints, over the public security of the State, freely dismissing and appointing police authorities;
- No. 6: freely appoint, on a provisional basis, a commander for the State Police Force and any other auxiliary officers from among the Army officers;
- No. 7: to use said force in the State's police service or to disarm it, if deemed necessary;
- No. 8: make use, in the general security service, the federal land and sea force placed at his disposal or to request it in greater numbers and efficiency from the Federal Government;
- No. 9: to adopt the necessary measures to guarantee all individual rights.

The decrees were published in the morning. Raul Fernandes did not dare to protest and at 12:00 he prepared to leave Ingá, accompanied only by his friend Heitor Collet. He took a boat from the Companhia Cantareira to the Federal District, and on the way, he crossed paths with the one carrying the interventor.

=== Reactions ===
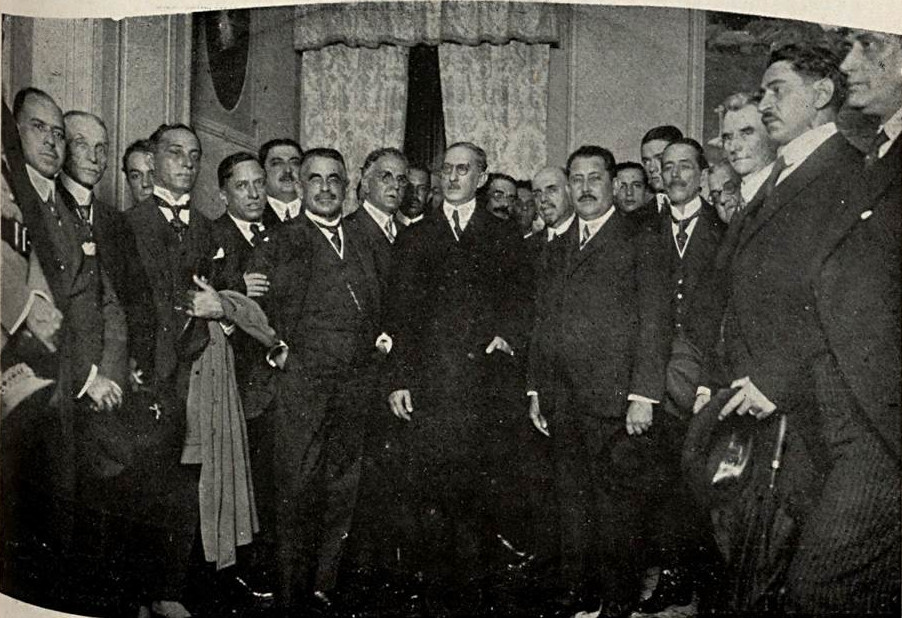
The President of Brazil, in the center, with Feliciano Sodré to his right

Bernardes lamented directly targeting "such a distinguished man as Raul Fernandes", and said that he "would like to see what Nilo will say about all this". Also on the 11th, Nilo wrote to the President: "Your Excellency did not hesitate to depress and demoralize the high power that judges the constitutionality of the laws and acts of Congress and the Government, as well as creating a disastrous precedent for the institutions and autonomy of the State".

The non-compliance with the habeas corpus ruling disappointed many Supreme Court justices. Justice Guimarães Natal, rapporteur of the process, called the intervention decree "the greatest attack on the authority of a judicial decision, which no other power has the competence to review and alter, and the most profound blow to the Constitution and the federal republican regime". Pedro dos Santos, who had voted against granting the habeas corpus, deemed that it should have been complied with. The justices considered issuing a statement of condemnation, but the following day concluded that it was not up to the Court to comment. The argument prevailed that only Congress could judge the intervention. Taking the controversy to the press and confronting the Executive would be too risky.

The repercussions of the Rio de Janeiro crisis were overshadowed by the outbreak of an armed conflict in Rio Grande do Sul. The Executive extended the state of emergency until the end of the year on 23 April, shortly before Congress resumed its activities, and requested confirmation of the intervention. The debates in the Chamber of Deputies were heated and inconsequential. There were few opposition deputies. Congressmen, politicians, and jurists widely supported the intervention, which was carefully undertaken in accordance with legal procedures. But very few attempted to refute the accusation that the intervention had been a vindictive gesture by Bernardes.

In the Constitution and Justice Committee of the Chamber of Deputies, where the case was reported by Juvenal Lamartine, Prudente de Morais Filho argued that the government could not comply with the habeas corpus and secure the investiture of an administration in Niterói, only to then claim that there was no legitimate administration in the state. He stated that the dual state government was not legitimate and compared the situation to Rio Grande do Sul, where there was no intervention. The final opinion of 9 June concluded that both Rio de Janeiro assemblies had illegitimate origins, therefore the federal Executive was authorized to intervene to intervene. Morais Filho, one of the very few dissidents of the Republican Party of São Paulo on this issue, would lose his seat in the following legislature.

In the Senate, where Nilo Peçanha represented Rio de Janeiro, he attacked the presidential decree as a "mockery of the defeated candidate for the Presidency of the Republic, from whom everything was taken, including his old province, reduced to the condition of a colony". Miguel de Carvalho replied, calling Nilo a "reckless alchemist who, for a long time, had heated the backlash of Rio de Janeiro politics, without leaving automatic valves through which the excess steam could escape" — a reference to the use of federal force twice in the past, in 1910 and 1914, against Backer and Sodré. In September, Congress approved the Executive's act.

=== Transition of power ===
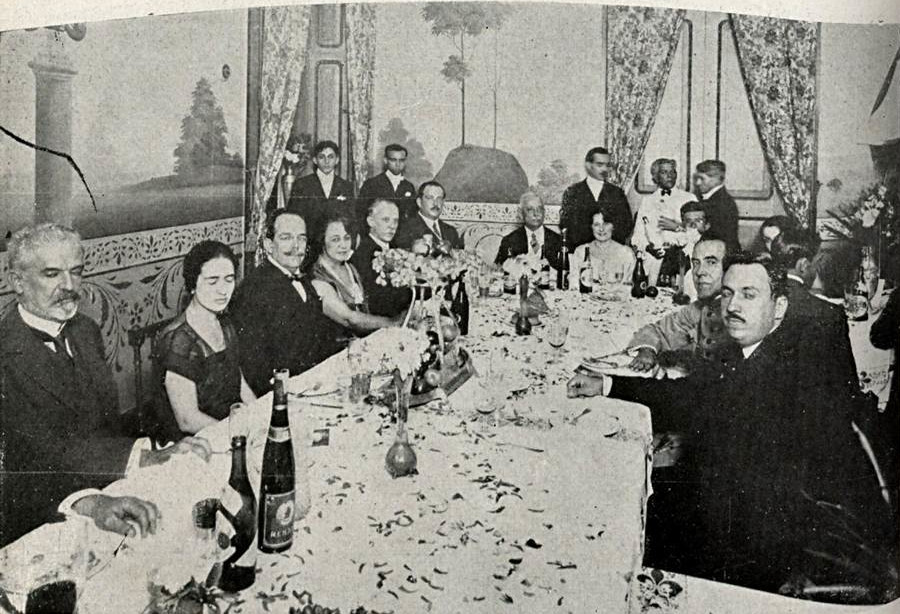
Banquet offered to the federal interventor (on the left side of the table, in the center) by the mayor of Campos

Aurelino Leal's intervention dismantled the Nilist political machine. To legitimize his power, Leal could not automatically transfer power to Sodré's followers. The intervention decree specified that the assistants would be "persons foreign to the warring parties". But his identification with the anti-Nilists was clear from the beginning. New police authorities, judges and justices of the peace were appointed in the countryside and the Niterói newspapers were censored.

All elections held in the state since 18 December 1921 were declared null and void. On 28 October, new elections for the Presidency and Assembly reorganized state politics. The Nilists did not present candidates and the greatest controversy was within the anti-Nilist bloc, between Backer and Sodré, both of whom wanted to be the candidate. On 23 December, Feliciano Sodré took office as president of the State and Paulino Soares de Sousa Júnior as vice-president. On the same day, the federal government lifted the state of emergency. In the federal elections of 17 February 1924, Nilism lost all its federal deputies and senators. In May, Nilists ran for some municipal councils and the mayoralty of Campos, but throughout the state they only managed to elect two councilors in Petrópolis.

Feliciano Sodré sought to define his government as a watershed in state history. The administration sought support from the larger states, through participation in the coffee defense policy, and greater independence from the Federal District. Among intellectuals, the moment was propitious for new reflections on the state. Lacerda Nogueira, secretary of the Fluminense Academy of Letters, founded the "Fluminense Renaissance" to "maintain in the state the respect for its great men, the cult of the memory of its great events, the defense of its liberal institutions". The new president gave his full support.

== Consequences ==
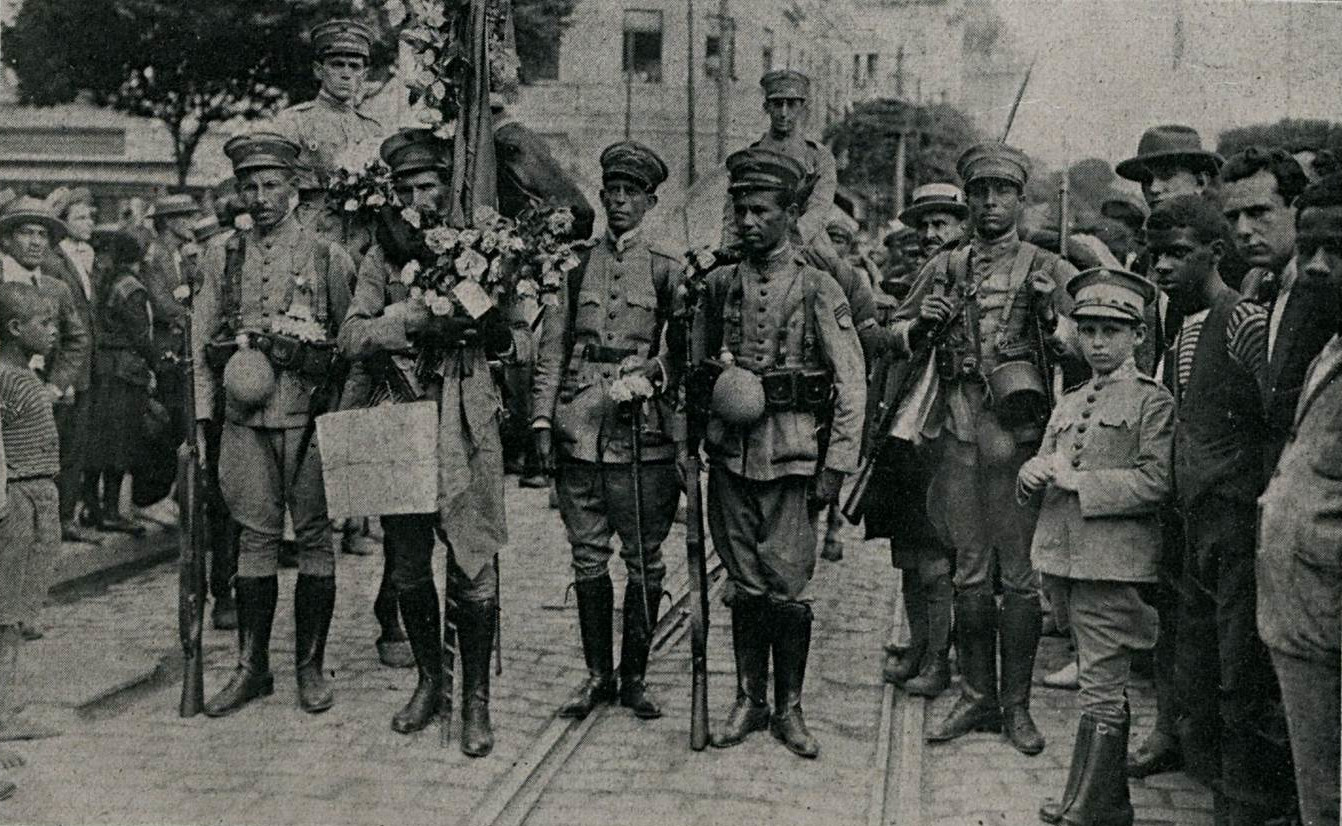
State soldiers from Rio de Janeiro who fought in São Paulo in 1924

Feliciano Sodré sought to define his government as a watershed in Rio de Janeiro's history. Among intellectuals, the moment was propitious for new reflections on the state. Lacerda Nogueira, secretary of the Rio de Janeiro Academy of Letters, founded the "Renascença Fluminense" to "maintain in the state the respect for its great men, the cult of the memory of its great events, the defense of its liberal institutions". The new state president gave his full support.

In the federal elections of 17 February 1924, Nilism lost all its federal deputies and senators. In May, they ran for some municipal councils and the mayorship of Campos, but in the entire state they only managed to elect two councillors in Petrópolis. Nilo Peçanha died on 31 March, prestigious but defeated. Until the last month of his life, his house was monitored by spies from the capital's political police, the 4th Auxiliary Police Bureau, looking for conspirators. The tenentist plotters of the São Paulo Revolt of 1924 greatly regretted Peçanha's death. The leader of the revolt, general Isidoro Dias Lopes, even discussed his plans with the former president in the first half of 1923.

On the other side of the fighting in São Paulo, two battalions of the Rio de Janeiro Police Force participated in the loyalist army, side by side with federal soldiers and those from other states. Good relations with the federal government were maintained by Sodré and his successor Manuel Duarte, in a political phase that would last until his deposition in the Revolution of 1930. In the elections to the Constituent Assembly in 1933, the Nilists reemerged from ostracism and elected the majority of the Rio de Janeiro congressional caucus.

The Bernardes government triumphed over all its former enemies from the Republican Reaction. In Bahia, the replacement of J. J. Seabra's supporters was secured by a declaration of a state of emergency. In Rio Grande do Sul, federal intermediation at the end of the 1923 civil war prohibited the re-election of Borges de Medeiros and incorporated him into the government support base. In the medium term, Bernardes' decisions in these three states lowered his image. The version prevailed that the president was vindictive. The biographers of the politicians involved tried to exempt them from responsibility. According to Afonso Arinos de Melo Franco, Bernardes defeated his opponents at the expense of the legitimacy of the regime itself. Historians point to this moment as one of hypertrophy of the federal Executive and decadence of the political-legal paradigm of the Governors' Politics.

Bernardes' defenders argued that Republican Reaction politicians threatened to overthrow the federal government. Even they acknowledged that the decisions were "preemptive" and planned in advance. Afonso Arinos, a critic of the decisions, cited documents from November 1921 as evidence of a plan to overthrow Nilo Peçanha: three legal opinions against the validity of the elections in Rio de Janeiro. Carlos Maximiliano, after arguing that the election of deputies would be null, concluded that "the door to federal intervention will be wide open". Pedro Tavares speculated that "the case will be essentially political, and it will be up to the Union [federal] government to intervene". Afrânio de Melo Franco would have written yet another study refuting the interventionist reasoning of previous opinions.

== See also ==
- 2018 federal intervention in Rio de Janeiro
