= 1906 Brazilian presidential election =

- 1 March 1906
- President
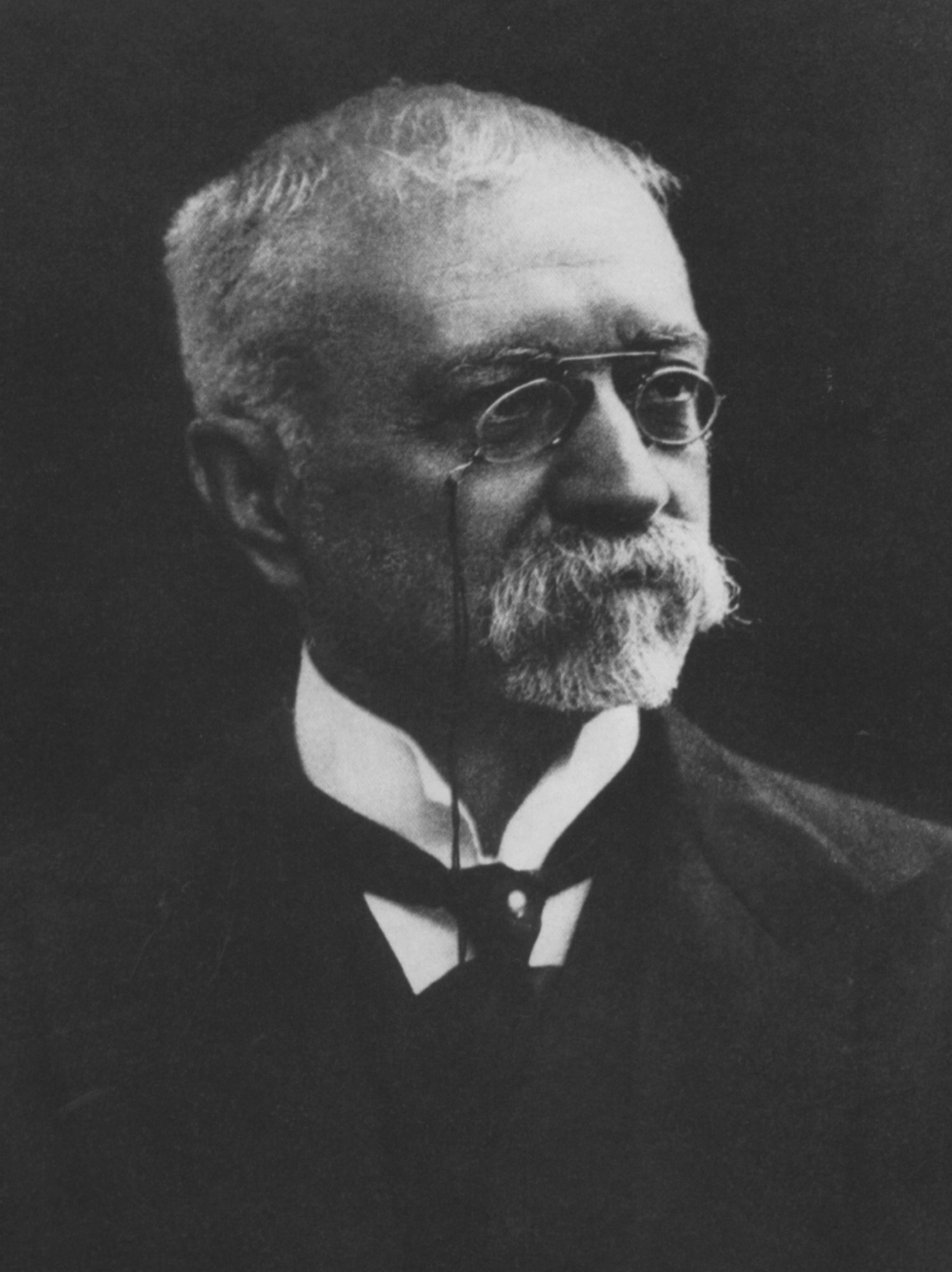

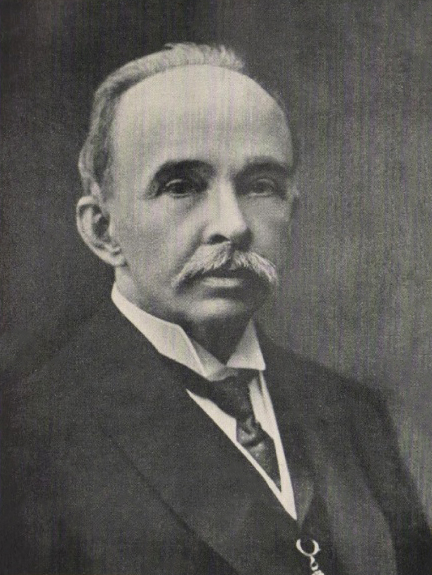
Nominee	Afonso Pena	Lauro Sodré
Party	PRM	PR Paraná
Popular vote	288,285	4,865
Percentage	97.92%	1.65%
- Results by state
President before election
Rodrigues Alves
PRP
Elected President
Afonso Pena
PRM
- Vice president
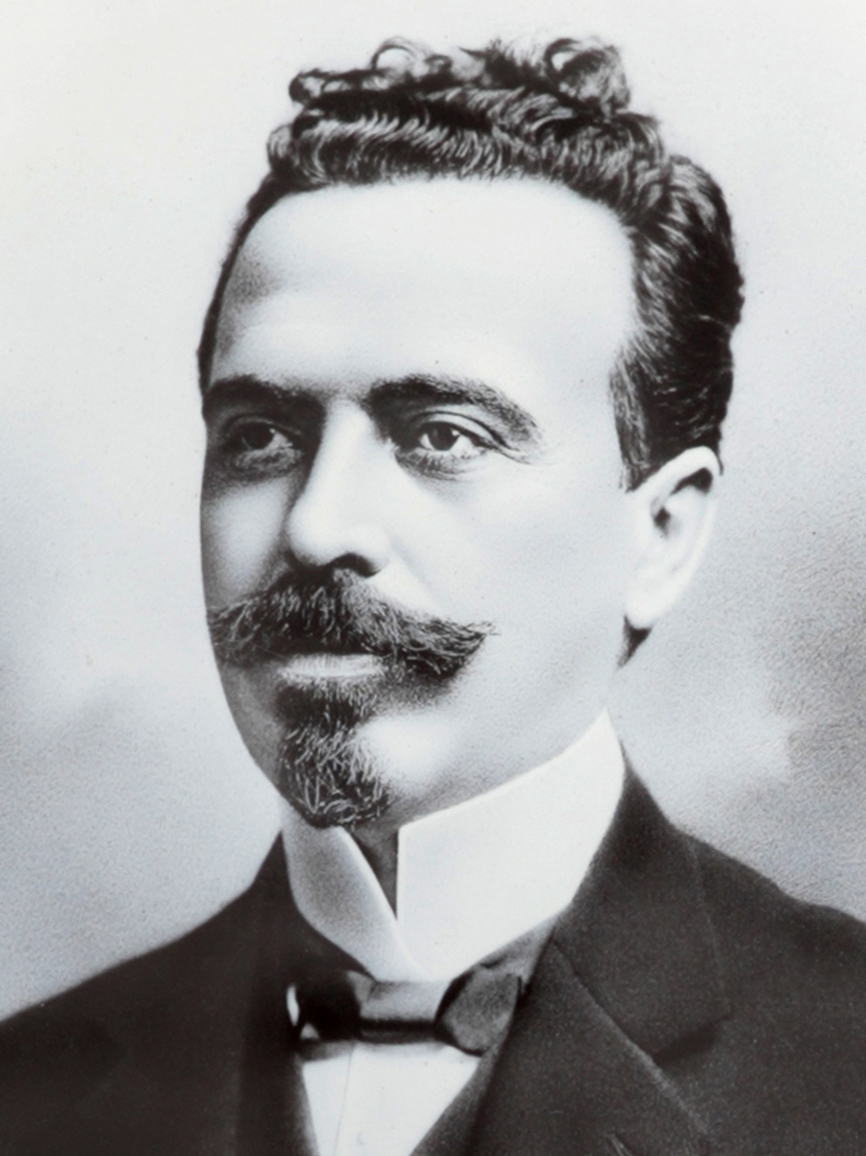

Nominee	Nilo Peçanha	Alfredo Varela
Party	PRF
Popular vote	272,529	618
Percentage	92.96%	0.21%
President before election
Afonso Pena
PRM
Elected President
Nilo Peçanha
PRF

Presidential elections were held in Brazil on 1 March 1906. The presidential elections were won by Afonso Pena of the Mineiro Republican Party, who received 98% of the vote. Nilo Peçanha of the Fluminense Republican Party was elected vice president, also receiving 98% of the vote.

== Results ==
=== President ===
Candidate	Party	Votes	%
Afonso Pena	Mineiro Republican Party	288,285	97.92
Lauro Sodré	Paraná Republican Party	4,865	1.65
Ruy Barbosa		207	0.07
Campos Sales		95	0.03
Severino Vieira		78	0.03
97 other candidates		871	0.30
Total		294,401	100.00
Source: Nohlen, Presidential Elections

=== Vice president ===
Candidate	Party	Votes	%
Nilo Peçanha	Fluminense Republican Party	272,529	92.96
Alfredo Varela		618	0.21
Ruy Barbosa		211	0.07
Rosa e Silva		207	0.07
Joaquim Sena		206	0.07
200 other candidates		19,399	6.62
Total		293,170	100.00
Source: Presidential Elections
