= Chácara das Pedras =

Neighborhood in Porto Alegre, Brazil

Coordinates: 30°02′05″S 51°09′47″W

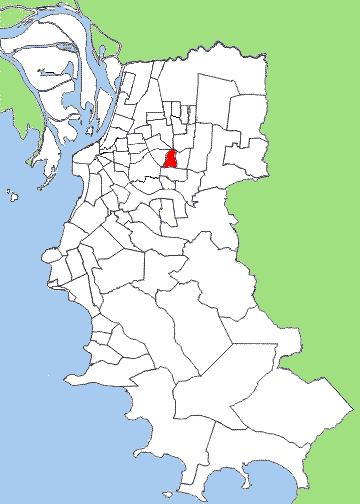
Chácara das Pedras

Chácara das Pedras (literally Farmstead of the Stones in English) is a neighbourhood (bairro) in the city of Porto Alegre, the state capital of Rio Grande do Sul, in Brazil. It was created by Law 2022 from December 7, 1959.

Chácara das Pedras was occupied for the first time during the end of the 19th century, but the population remained low until the 1950s, when it became a residential area. With the establishment of the Iguatemi shopping, the area increased its value, and now most of its buildings are upper and upper middle class houses. Moreover, there are many squares in this neighbourhood, and its streets are relatively quiet, aside from Nilo Peçanha Avenue.

== Notable residents ==
- Lya Luft, writer and translator
