= Quintino Bocaiuva =

Brazilian politician (1836–1912)

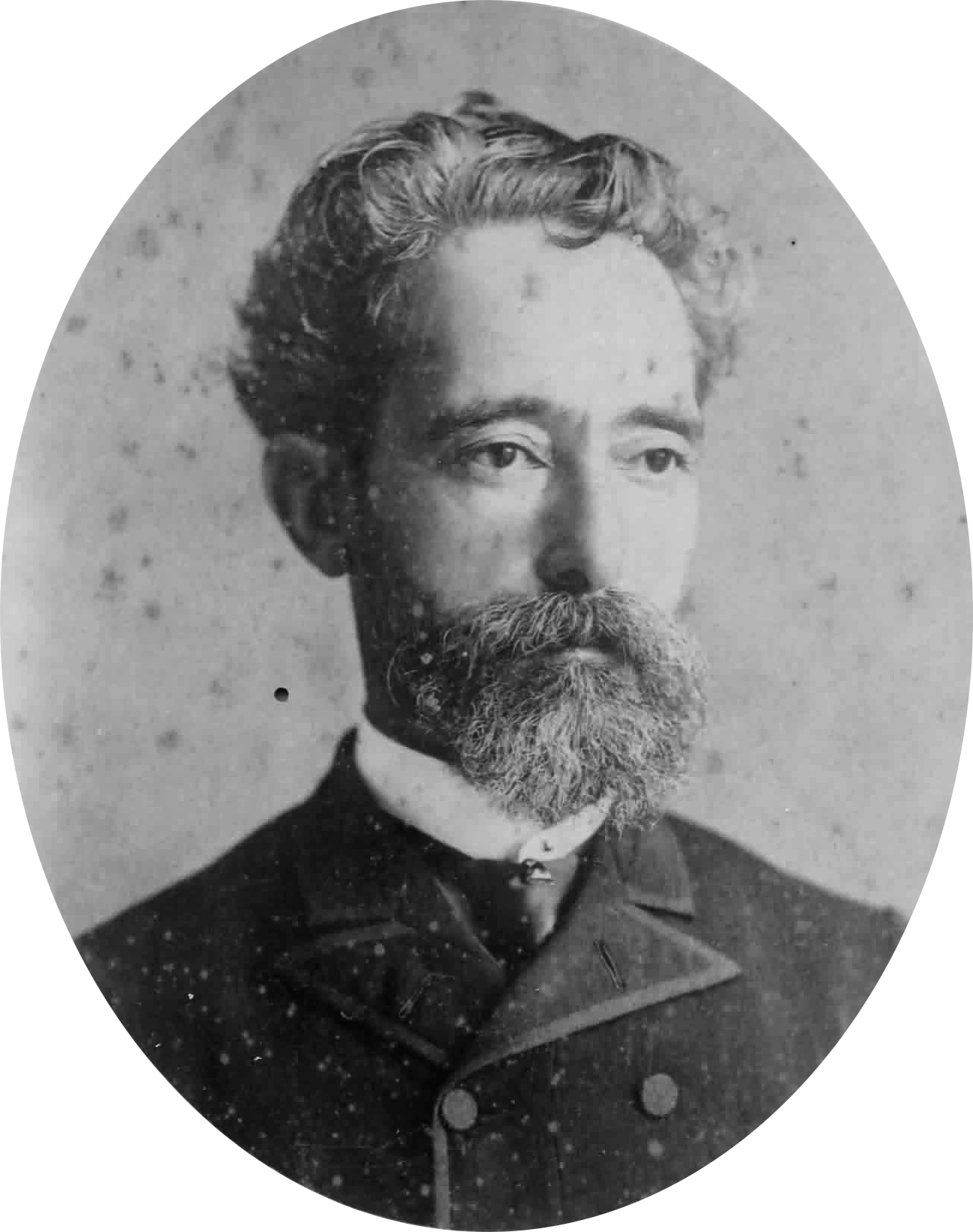

Vice President of the Federal Senate
- In office 26 June 1909 – 11 July 1912
- Preceded by: Rui Barbosa
- Succeeded by: Pinheiro Machado

President of Rio de Janeiro
- In office 31 December 1900 – 31 December 1903
- Vice President: 1. Rangel Pestana; 2. Pereira Lima; 3. Antonino Fialho
- Preceded by: Alberto Torres
- Succeeded by: Nilo Peçanha

Secretary of State of Foreign Affairs
- In office 15 November 1889 – 23 January 1891
- President: Deodoro da Fonseca
- Preceded by: José Francisco Diana
- Succeeded by: Justo Chermont

Legislative offices
- 1909–1912: Senator
- 1892–1900: Senator
- 1890–1891: Senator

Personal details
- Born: Quintino Antônio Ferreira de Sousa; 4 December 1836 Itaguaí, Rio de Janeiro, Empire of Brazil
- Died: 11 July 1912 (aged 75) Rio de Janeiro, Federal District, Brazil
- Spouses: Luísa Amélia de Almeida Costa (m. 1860; died 1885) Ana Bianca Rossi (m. 1892)
- Children: 15
- Parents: Quintino Ferreira de Sousa (father); Maria Candelaria Moreno y Aragón (mother)
- Occupation: journalist; politician; reviewer; typographer

Military service
- Allegiance: Brazil
- Branch/service: Brazilian Army
- Years of service: No service
- Rank: Brigadier general (honorific)

Quintino Antônio Ferreira de Sousa Bocaiuva (4 December 1836 – 11 July 1912) was a Brazilian politician and writer. He served as the Minister of Foreign Affairs of Brazil between 1889 and 1891. He was also President of the State of Rio de Janeiro, between 1900 and 1903. He was known for his actions during the Proclamation of the Republic.

Bocaiuva was born in Itaguaí and then moved to São Paulo, where he started working as a typographer. He started to study Law but dropped out of his studies due economic reasons. As a Nativist, he adopted the name "Bocaiuva", in reference to a local kind of palm tree. He started his career as a journalist, defending Republican ideas in some newspapers of Rio de Janeiro.

He died in Rio de Janeiro at the age of 75. The neighborhood where he lived in the city was named after him, Quintino Bocaiuva, and is popularly known as Quintino.
