= List of governors of Rio de Janeiro =

Governor of Rio de Janeiro
- Coat of arms

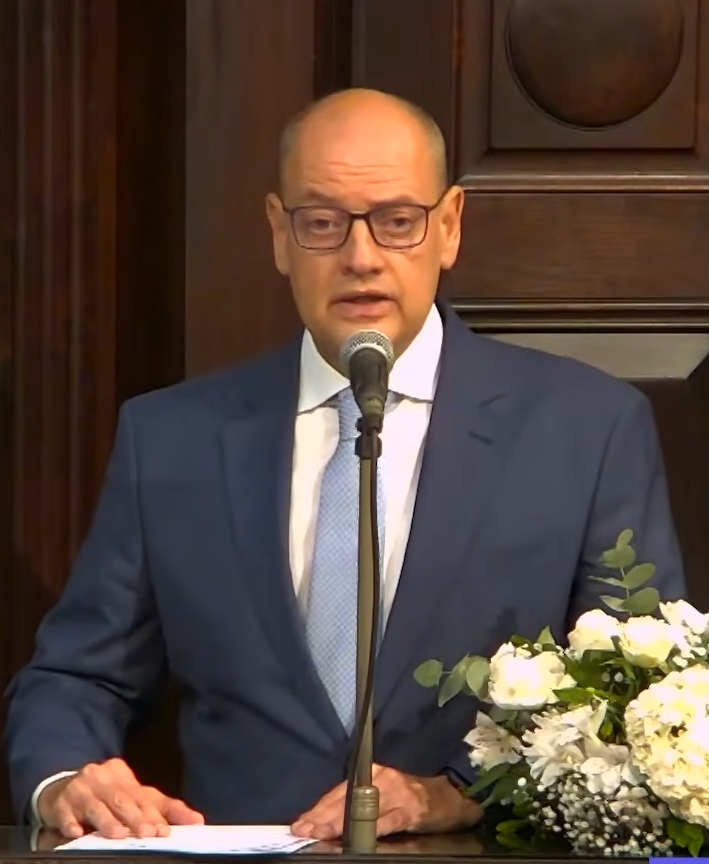
- Incumbent; Ricardo Couto de Castro since 23 March 2026
- Style: Mr. Governor or even simply Governor (informal); Most Excellent Mr. Governor (formal); His Excellency (alternative formal, diplomatic)
- Status: Head of government
- Residence: Laranjeiras Palace
- Term length: Four years, renewable once consecutively
- Constituting instrument: 1989 State Constitution
- Inaugural holder: Fonseca e Silva
- Formation: 15 November 1889; 136 years ago
- Deputy: Vice Governor of Rio de Janeiro
- Website: rj.gov.br

This is a list of governadores (Portuguese "governors"), interventores ("inspectors") and presidents of the State of Rio de Janeiro, Brazil.

Throughout its history, Rio de Janeiro has been governed by governor-generals, viceroys, ministers of the Empire, provincial presidents, presidents, and mayors, with its current designation "governor" coming with the Brazilian Constitution of 1946.

== Governors ==
=== First Republic (1889–1930) ===
No.	Portrait	Governor	Took office	Left office	Time in office	Party	Election	Vice Governor
1	Fonseca e Silva	Fonseca e Silva (1848–1906)	15 November 1889	16 November 1889	1 day	Independent	–	Vacant
2	Francisco Portela	Francisco Portela (1833–1913)	16 November 1889	10 December 1891	2 years, 24 days	PRF	1891	Manuel Torres (PRF); Teófilo Almeida (PRF); Cirilo Fagundes (PRF)
3	José Guimarães	José Guimarães (1838–1903)	10 December 1891	11 December 1891	1 day	Independent	–	Vacant
4	Baltasar da Silveira	Baltasar da Silveira (1843–1913)	11 December 1891	3 May 1892	144 days	Independent	–	Leopoldo Teixeira Leite (Ind); Miguel de Carvalho (Ind)
5	José Porciúncula	José Porciúncula (1854–1901)	3 May 1892	31 December 1894	2 years, 242 days	PRF	1892	Manuel Torres (PRF)
6	Maurício de Abreu	Maurício de Abreu (1852–1913)	31 December 1894	31 December 1897	3 years, 0 days	PRF	1894	Bento Pereira (PRF)
7	Alberto Torres	Alberto Torres (1865–1917)	31 December 1897	31 December 1900	3 years, 0 days	PRF	1897	Francisco de Souza Mota (PRF)
8	Quintino Bocaiuva	Quintino Bocaiuva (1836–1912)	31 December 1900	31 December 1903	3 years, 0 days	Independent	1900	Rangel Pestana (Ind)
9	Nilo Peçanha	Nilo Peçanha (1867–1924)	31 December 1903	1 November 1906	2 years, 305 days	PRF	1903	Oliveira Botelho (PRF)
10	Oliveira Botelho	Oliveira Botelho (1868–1943)	1 November 1906	31 December 1906	60 days	PRF	–	José Oliveira (PRF)
11	Alfredo Backer	Alfredo Backer (1851–1937)	31 December 1906	31 December 1910	4 years, 0 days	PRF	1906	Luiz da Silva Castro (PRF)
12	Oliveira Botelho	Oliveira Botelho (1868–1943)	31 December 1910	31 December 1914	4 years, 0 days	PRF; PRC	1910	João de Oliveira Guimarães (PRF)
13	Nilo Peçanha	Nilo Peçanha (1867–1924)	31 December 1914	7 May 1917	2 years, 127 days	PRF	1914	Francisco Guimarães (PRF)
14	Francisco Guimarães	Francisco Guimarães (1857–1917)	7 May 1917	19 June 1917	43 days	PRF	–	Agnelo Collet (PRF)
15	Agnelo Collet	Agnelo Collet (1862–1929)	19 June 1917	31 December 1918	1 year, 195 days	PRF	–	Antônio Leite Pinto (PRF)
16	Raul Veiga	Raul Veiga (1878–1947)	31 December 1918	31 December 1922	4 years, 0 days	PRF	1918	Domingos Almeida (PRF)
17	Raul Fernandes	Raul Fernandes (1877–1968)	31 December 1922	11 January 1923	11 days	PRF	1922	Artur Costa (PRF)
18	Aurelino Leal	Aurelino Leal (1877–1924)	11 January 1923	23 December 1923	346 days	Independent	–	Vacant
19	Feliciano Sodré	Feliciano Sodré (1881–1945)	23 December 1923	23 December 1927	4 years, 0 days	PRC	1923	Paulino de Souza Júnior (PRC); João Werneck (PRC)
20	Manuel Duarte	Manuel Duarte (1877–1944)	23 December 1927	24 October 1930	2 years, 305 days	PRF	1927	Eduardo Portella (PRF); Humberto Pentagna (PRF)

=== Vargas Era (1930–1945) ===
No.	Portrait	Governor	Took office	Left office	Time in office
21	Demócrito Barbosa	Demócrito Barbosa (1880–1961)	24 October 1930	27 October 1930	3 days
22	Plínio Casado	Plínio Casado (1870–1964)	27 October 1930	29 May 1931	214 days
23	Mena Barreto	Mena Barreto (1874–1933)	29 May 1931	4 November 1931	159 days
24	Pantaleão Pessoa	Pantaleão Pessoa (1885–1980)	4 November 1931	14 December 1931	40 days
25	Ari Parreiras	Ari Parreiras	16 December 1931	7 November 1935	3 years, 326 days
26	Newton Cavalcanti	Newton Cavalcanti (1885–1965)	7 November 1935	12 November 1935	5 days
27	Protógenes Guimarães	Protógenes Guimarães (1876–1938)	12 November 1935	9 November 1937	1 year, 362 days
28	Amaral Peixoto	Amaral Peixoto (1905–1989)	9 November 1937	29 October 1945	7 years, 354 days

=== Fourth Republic (1945–1964) ===
No.	Portrait	Governor	Took office	Left office	Time in office	Party	Election	Vice Governor
29	Alfredo Neves	Alfredo Neves (1887–1975)	29 October 1945	6 November 1945	8 days	PSD	–	Vacant
30	Abel Magalhães	Abel Magalhães (1881–1969)	6 November 1945	10 February 1946	96 days	Independent	–	Vacant
31	Lúcio Meira	Lúcio Meira (1907–1991)	10 February 1946	23 September 1946	225 days	Independent	–	Vacant
32	Hugo Silva	Hugo Silva (1900–1982)	23 September 1946	6 February 1947	136 days	Independent	–	Vacant
33	Francisco Santos	Francisco Santos (1898–1977)	6 February 1947	8 February 1947	2 days	Independent	–	Vacant
34	Álvaro Rocha	Álvaro Rocha (1874–1964)	8 February 1947	24 February 1947	16 days	Independent	–	Vacant
35	Macedo Soares	Macedo Soares (1901–1989)	24 February 1947	31 January 1951	3 years, 341 days	PSD	1947	João Guimarães (PSD)
36	Amaral Peixoto	Amaral Peixoto (1805–1989)	31 January 1951	31 January 1955	4 years, 0 days	PSD	1950	Tarcísio Miranda (PST)
37	Miguel Couto Filho	Miguel Couto Filho (1900–1969)	31 January 1955	2 July 1958	3 years, 152 days	PSD	1954	Roberto Silveira (PTB)
38	Togo Barros	Togo Barros (1914–2007)	2 July 1958	31 January 1959	213 days	PSD	–	Roberto Silveira (PTB)
39	Roberto Silveira	Roberto Silveira (1923–1961)	31 January 1959	28 February 1961	2 years, 28 days	PTB	1958	Celso Peçanha (PSD)
40	Celso Peçanha	Celso Peçanha (1916–2016)	28 February 1961	7 July 1962	1 year, 129 days	PSD	–	Vacant
41	José Janotti	José Janotti (1916–1980)	7 July 1962	18 January 1963	195 days	PSD	–	Vacant
42	Luís Miguel Pinaud	Luís Miguel Pinaud (1897–1973)	18 January 1963	31 January 1963	13 days	Independent	–	Vacant
43	Badger da Silveira	Badger da Silveira (1916–1999)	31 January 1963	1 May 1964	1 year, 91 days	PTB	1962	João Batista da Costa (PSD)

=== Military Dictatorship (1964–1985) ===
No.	Portrait	Governor	Took office	Left office	Time in office	Party	Election	Vice Governor
44	Cordolino Ambrósio	Cordolino Ambrósio (1904–1979)	1 May 1964	4 May 1964	3 days	PTB	–	Vacant
45	Paulo Torres	Paulo Torres (1903–2000)	4 May 1964	12 August 1966	2 years, 100 days	ARENA	1964	Simão Mansur (UDN); Teotônio Araújo (ARENA)
46	Teotônio Araújo	Teotônio Araújo (1918–1978)	12 August 1966	31 January 1967	172 days	ARENA	–	Vacant
47	Geremias Fontes	Geremias Fontes (1930–2010)	31 January 1967	31 March 1971	4 years, 59 days	ARENA	1966	Heli Ribeiro Gomes (ARENA)
48	Raimundo Padilha	Raimundo Padilha (1899–1988)	31 March 1971	15 March 1975	3 years, 349 days	ARENA	1970	Teotônio Araújo (ARENA)
49	Faria Lima	Faria Lima (1917–2011)	15 March 1975	15 March 1979	4 years, 0 days	ARENA	1974	Vacant
50	Chagas Freitas	Chagas Freitas (1914–1991)	15 March 1979	15 March 1983	4 years, 0 days	MDB	1978	Hamilton Xavier (MDB)

=== Sixth Republic (1985–present) ===
No.	Portrait	Governor	Took office	Left office	Time in office	Party	Election	Vice Governor
51	Leonel Brizola	Leonel Brizola (1922–2004)	15 March 1983	15 March 1987	4 years, 0 days	PDT	1982	Darcy Ribeiro (PDT)
52	Moreira Franco	Moreira Franco (born 1944)	15 March 1987	15 March 1991	4 years, 0 days	MDB	1986	Francisco Amaral (MDB)
53	Leonel Brizola	Leonel Brizola (1922–2004)	15 March 1991	2 April 1994	3 years, 18 days	PDT	1990	Nilo Batista (PDT)
54	Nilo Batista	Nilo Batista (born 1944)	2 April 1994	1 January 1995	274 days	PDT	–	Vacant
55	Marcello Alencar	Marcello Alencar (1925–2014)	1 January 1995	1 January 1999	4 years, 0 days	PSDB	1994	Luiz Paulo (PSDB)
56	Anthony Garotinho	Anthony Garotinho (born 1960)	1 January 1999	6 April 2002	3 years, 95 days	PDT; PSB	1998	Benedita da Silva (PT)
57	Benedita da Silva	Benedita da Silva (born 1942)	6 April 2002	1 January 2003	270 days	PT	–	Vacant
58	Rosinha Garotinho	Rosinha Garotinho (born 1963)	1 January 2003	1 January 2007	4 years, 0 days	PSB; MDB	2002	Luiz Paulo Conde (PSB)
59	Sérgio Cabral Filho	Sérgio Cabral Filho (born 1963)	1 January 2007	3 April 2014	7 years, 92 days	MDB	2006; 2010	Luiz Fernando Pezão (MDB)
60	Luiz Fernando Pezão	Luiz Fernando Pezão (born 1955)	3 April 2014	1 January 2019	4 years, 273 days	MDB	– 2014	Vacant; Francisco Dornelles (PP)
61	Wilson Witzel	Wilson Witzel (born 1968)	1 January 2019	30 April 2021	2 years, 119 days	PSC	2018	Cláudio Castro (PSC)
62	Cláudio Castro	Cláudio Castro (born 1979)	30 April 2021	23 March 2026	4 years, 327 days	PSC; PL	– 2022	Vacant; Thiago Pampolha (UNIÃO)
63	Ricardo Couto de Castro	Ricardo Couto de Castro; Acting	23 March 2026	Incumbent	168 days	Independent	–	Vacant
