= Alberto Torres =

Alberto Torres may refer to:

- Alberto Torres (politician) (1865–1917), Brazilian politician and social thinker
- Alberto Torres (athlete) (1934–1999), Dominican Republic sprinter
- Alberto Torres (wrestler) (1934–1971), American professional wrestler
