= Celso Peçanha =

Brazilian politician (1916–2016)

- Celso Peçanha

Governor of Rio de Janeiro
- In office March 1, 1961 – July 7, 1962
- Preceded by: Roberto Silveira
- Succeeded by: José de Carvalho Jannotti

Vice Governor of Rio de Janeiro
- In office 1958 – March 1, 1961

Personal details
- Born: August 2, 1916 Campos dos Goytacazes, Rio de Janeiro
- Died: July 13, 2016 (aged 99) Rio de Janeiro, RJ
- Party: PFL; PTB; PSD; MDB
- Spouse: Hilka Peçanha
- Profession: Lawyer, academic, journalist

Celso Peçanha (August 2, 1916 – July 13, 2016) was a Brazilian politician, lawyer, and journalist. He served as the acting Governor of Rio de Janeiro state from 1961 to 1962, following the death of his predecessor, Governor Roberto Silveira.

== Biography ==
Peçanha, the son of Ruy Peçanha and Maria Crespo Peçanha, was born on August 2, 1916, in Campos dos Goytacazes, Rio de Janeiro, and raised in the city's Santo Eduardo neighborhood. Peçanha was the nephew of Nilo Peçanha, who served as President of Brazil from 1909 to 1910 and Governor of Rio de Janeiro from 1914 to 1917.

=== Career ===
In 1938, Peçanha enrolled in law school at the Faculdade de Direito de Niterói and was elected vice president of the school's chapter of the National Union of Students in 1939. He transitioned to politics shortly after completing law school. Rio de Janeiro Governor Ernani do Amaral Peixoto appointed Peçanha as mayor of the municipality of Bom Jardim from 1941 to 1943. He also served as the mayor of Rio Bonito, Rio de Janeiro, on three occasions.

In 1950, was elected to the federal Chamber of Deputies from Rio de Janeiro as a member of the Brazilian Labour Party (PTB). He won re-election to the Chamber of Deputies in 1954.

Celso Peçanha was elected Vice Governor of Rio de Janeiro in 1958, this time as a candidate for the Social Democratic Party (PSD). (The state governor and vice governor elected separately at the time). He served as vice governor until 1961, when Rio de Janeiro Governor Roberto Silveira died unexpectedly in an accident. Peçanha was sworn in as acting governor, a position he held from 1961 until 1962. He unsuccessfully ran for the Federal Senate in 1962, but lost the election. Peçanha then largely retired from politics throughout the rest of the 1960s and 1970s. Instead, he worked for the state court, the Tribunal de Contas do Estado, as well as a journalist and a professor of administrative law.

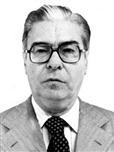
Político Celso Peçanha enquanto Deputado Federal

In 1978, Peçanha returned to politics when he won a seat in the Chamber of Deputies as a Brazilian Democratic Movement (MDB) candidate. The MDB dissolved in 1979. Peçanha joined the Brazilian Labour Party (PTB) in 1982, the same year that he won re-election to the Chamber of Deputies. Three years later, Pecanha became of the co-founders of the now defunct Liberal Front Party (PFL). He ran for a seat in the Brazilian Constituent Assembly, but lost the election.

He and his wife, Hilka Peçanha, established several community and philanthropic organizations, including the Associação Filantrópica Educacional Hilka e Celso Peçanha and a neighborhood association in the iSanta Rosa section of Niterói. He also authored ten literary books.

Celso Peçanha died in the city of Rio de Janeiro, where he resided, on July 13, 2016, at the age of 99. He was buried in the municipality of Niterói.
