= 2018 federal intervention in Rio de Janeiro =

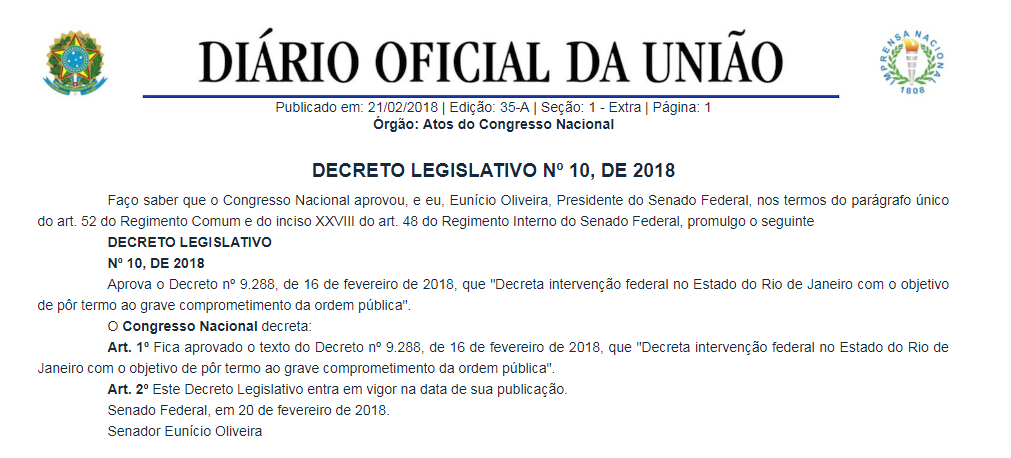
- National Congress decree approving the intervention.
- Date formed: February 21, 2018
- Date dissolved: January 1, 2019
- President: Michel Temer
- Federal intervener: Walter Braga Netto

The 2018 federal intervention in Rio de Janeiro was the first since the 1988 Federal Constitution. It was decreed by the Federal Government of Brazil in order to ease the internal security situation of the state of Rio de Janeiro. The measure was implemented by Decree No. 9,288 of February 16, 2018, granted by Michel Termer and published in the Diário Oficial da União on the same day.

Before the intervention bill was issued, emergency meetings were held at the Alvorada Palace with ministers, Rodrigo Maia, the president of the Chamber of Deputies, Eunício Oliveira, the president of the Federal Senate, and Luiz Fernando Pezão, the governor of Rio de Janeiro.

Army General Walter Souza Braga Netto, commander of the Eastern Military Command, based in the city of Rio de Janeiro, was appointed as intervenor. He was responsible for security at the 2016 Summer Olympics, held in the same city. He assumed command of Rio de Janeiro's Military Police, Civil Police and Firefighters, and answered directly to the President of the Republic.

== Historical context ==
In 2016, the state of Rio de Janeiro was experiencing an economic crisis, suffering from a lack of funds to pay civil servants' salaries. The shortage of resources also affected investments in public security, which forced the government to declare a state of public calamity; the number of murders and incidents has increased significantly. In 2017, 134 military police officers were killed because of criminality. In the same year, Operation Hurricane (or Operation Rio) was decreed by President Temer with the aim of establishing a Guarantee of Law and Order (GLO). The Brazilian Intelligence Agency, the Federal Highway Police, the National Public Security Force and the Federal Police have joined forces to form a General Staff.

== Opposing reactions ==
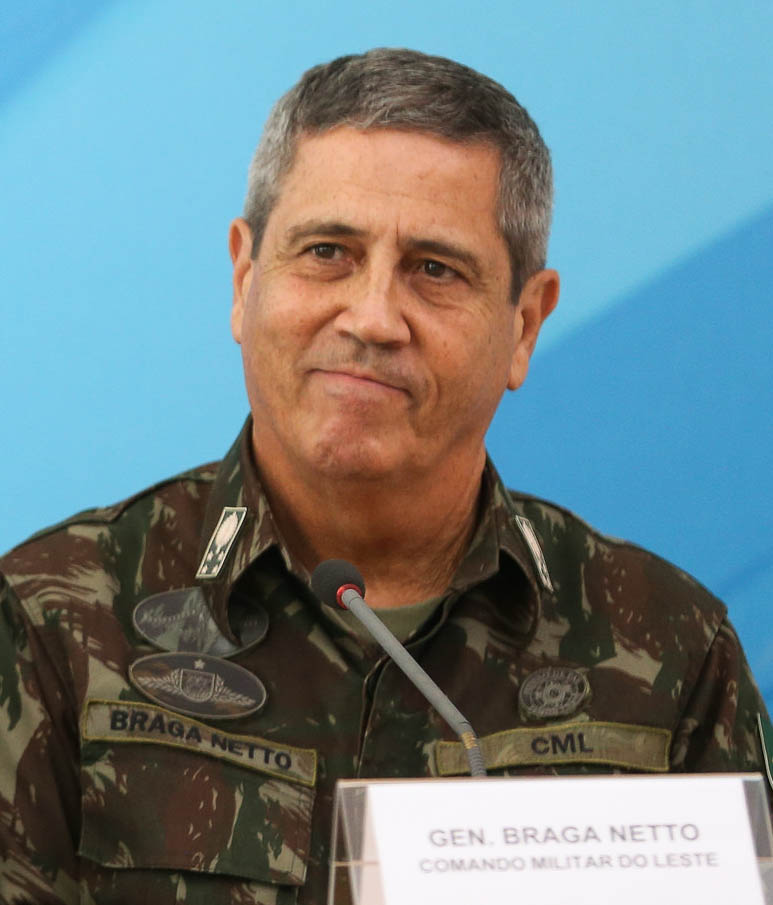
The Eastern Military Commander, General Braga Netto, at a press conference on the intervention decree in Rio de Janeiro.

The intervention decree was questioned in the Supreme Federal Court (STF), which claimed that the Council of the Republic and the National Defense Council were not consulted before the decision. The case was assigned to Minister Rosa Weber, who denied the petition filed by lawyer Carlos Alexandre Klomfahs under the argument that he could not have initiated the action before the STF. Some analysts compared the federal intervention to the Cruzado Plan, considering it to be a palliative measure with a temporary effect that does not involve structural measures capable of fighting crime in the long term. A month after the intervention, the federal government had still not defined the amount required to finance the interventionists' actions and how the resources would be obtained, which reinforced the improvised image of the measure.

On March 14, 2018, the Socialism and Liberty Party (PSOL) filed the Direct Action of Unconstitutionality, assigned to Minister Ricardo Lewandowski, initially arguing that the measure adopted by Temer, besides being disproportionate and costly, has electoral character, violating the provisions of the Federal Constitution. In addition, it mentions flaws in basic procedures, as, given the constitutional principle of non-intervention by the Federal Government in the states, the interventional decree was issued without sufficient justification, prior consultation with the Councils of the Republic and National Defense and without specifying the interventional measures. It also claimed that the measure was unconstitutional due to its character as a military intervention with the attribution of the civil powers of a governor to an army general. Minister Ricardo Lewandowski requested information from President Temer and a hearing from the Federal Attorney General's Office and the Prosecutor General of the Republic. The action was dismissed on February 28, 2019, and became final on March 29, 2019, as the intervention was terminated on December 31, 2018.

== Strategic Plan of the Intervention Office ==
On May 29, 2018, the Federal Intervention Office released a Strategic Plan with the purpose of "establishing the basis for strategic planning and management of the activities carried out within the scope of the Federal Intervention Office for Public Security in the State of Rio de Janeiro." The document includes broad management, restructuring and integration strategies, and sets out emergency actions, which seek short-term results, and structuring actions, intended to achieve medium and long-term results. It also points out that planning, public security and defense actions require knowledge produced by intelligence under coordination and integrated planning based on information technology resources.

=== Objectives ===
- Lower crime rates;
- Recovering the operational capacity of the state's public security bodies;
- Coordinating the institutions of the federal entities;
- Strengthening the institutional character of public security and the prison system;
- Improving the quality and management of Rio de Janeiro's prison system.

=== Main emergency actions ===
- Community security actions;
- Action based on the "criminal spot";
- Training for Rio de Janeiro Military Police troops;
- Incorporation of new recruits;

=== Main structuring actions ===
- Fighting corruption within the agencies;
- Protocols for integrating intelligence actions for all Public Security Agencies, Prison Administration Secretariats and National Secretariats for Civil Protection and Defense;
- Protocols for institutional support between Public Security Agencies;
- Acquisition of vehicles, weapons, personal protective equipment and special materials;
- Reorganizing the structure of public security in Rio de Janeiro.

== Criticism ==
The actions of the Federal Intervention Office caused controversy. Groups linked to left-wing ideological organizations and against militarism, such as the Intervention Observatory and Amnesty International, criticized the cabinet's actions, emphasizing the increase in deaths due to police intervention. The Rio de Janeiro Public Prosecutor's Office stated that it was the result of the larger police presence, combined with the violent reaction of criminals. The Intervention Office pointed the structural actions, whose results were not achieved in the short term, and reported a reduction in street robberies, vehicle and cargo thefts.

Critics argue that, just as the dismantling of the Medellín and Cali cartels has not solved the problem of drug trafficking in Colombia, military action without investment in removing the circumstances that cause such activity will only result in the strengthening of drug traffickers. In addition, the army only spent 4.2% of its budget on intelligence.

== Criminal investigation ==
In 2023, Brazil's Federal Police opened an inquiry to investigate the existence and subsequent extent of financial fraud committed during the federal intervention, which received a total of R$1.2 billion in federal funds. On September 12, several search and seizure warrants were executed in three states and the Federal District to investigate crimes of sponsoring improper contracting, illegal waiver of bidding, active and passive corruption and criminal organization, which were allegedly practiced by federal civil servants in the acquisition of 9,360 bulletproof vests.

The fraud allegedly consisted of increasing the prices of vests in tenders and paying the money to the US company CTU Security LLC in exchange for bribes to Brazilian officials. The US government detected the company's financial transactions with Brazilian funds during an investigation into the murder of Jovenel Moïse and sent the evidence of the crimes to Brazil. The Federal Court of Accounts also identified R$4.6 million in losses resulting from the embezzlement.

Walter Souza Braga Netto, interventor appointed by Michel Temer, had his phone records breached by judicial authorization. Márcio Moufarrege, the drug dealer accused of international drug trafficking for using a Brazilian Air Force plane to transport cocaine to Spain during a stopover by Jair Bolsonaro's presidential entourage in 2019, has been investigated for clandestinely transferring money between the US and Brazil to the military involved in the purchase of ballistic vests during the federal intervention.

== See also ==
- 1923 federal intervention in Rio de Janeiro
- Social issues in Brazil
- 2017 Brazil prison riots
- Law enforcement in Brazil
- Crime in Brazil
