= Heloísa Alberto Torres =

Brazilian anthropologist and museum director

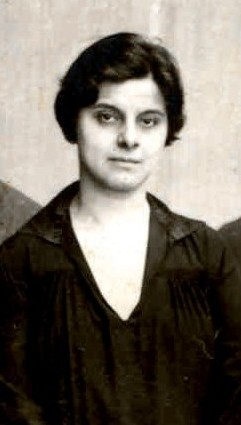
Heloísa Alberto Torres

Heloísa Alberto Torres (17 September 1895 – 23 February 1977), also known as Dona Heloísa, was Brazilian anthropologist and museum director.

== Biography ==
Heloísa Alberto Torres was born on 17 September 1895 in Rio de Janeiro. Her father Alberto Torres was an intellectual who served as Justice of the Supreme Federal Court. Edgar Roquette-Pinto (1884 – 1954), who was an assistant professor of anthropology at the National Museum of Brazil and a friend of Alberto Torres, brought Heloísa as an intern to the Anthropology section of the Museum. She became one of the first women to join the National Museum along with Bertha Lutz.

In the beginning of her career, she had “no formal training in anthropology”, but she gradually developed her interest on it. The excavation of ancient ceramics from Marajo Island was her “notable fieldwork”. In 1935 she was appointed as vice director of the National Museum, and in 1938 she became the director, a position she held for nearly two decades, until her retirement in 1955. She taught at the National Museum, at Faculty of Philosophy of the Lafayette Institute, and the State University of Rio de Janeiro.

She used her “wide network of relations in both politics and Brazilian public administration” to generate adequate resources for training anthropologists to study the indigenous peoples in Brazil. While she was the director, she signed an agreement with Columbia University to advance ethnological studies in Brazil. Museum's collections were used to teach the visiting scholars.

She played an important role in developing “Brazilian indigenist policies”.

She died on 23 February 1977 in Rio de Janeiro.
