= 1922 Brazilian presidential election =

- President
- 1 March 1922
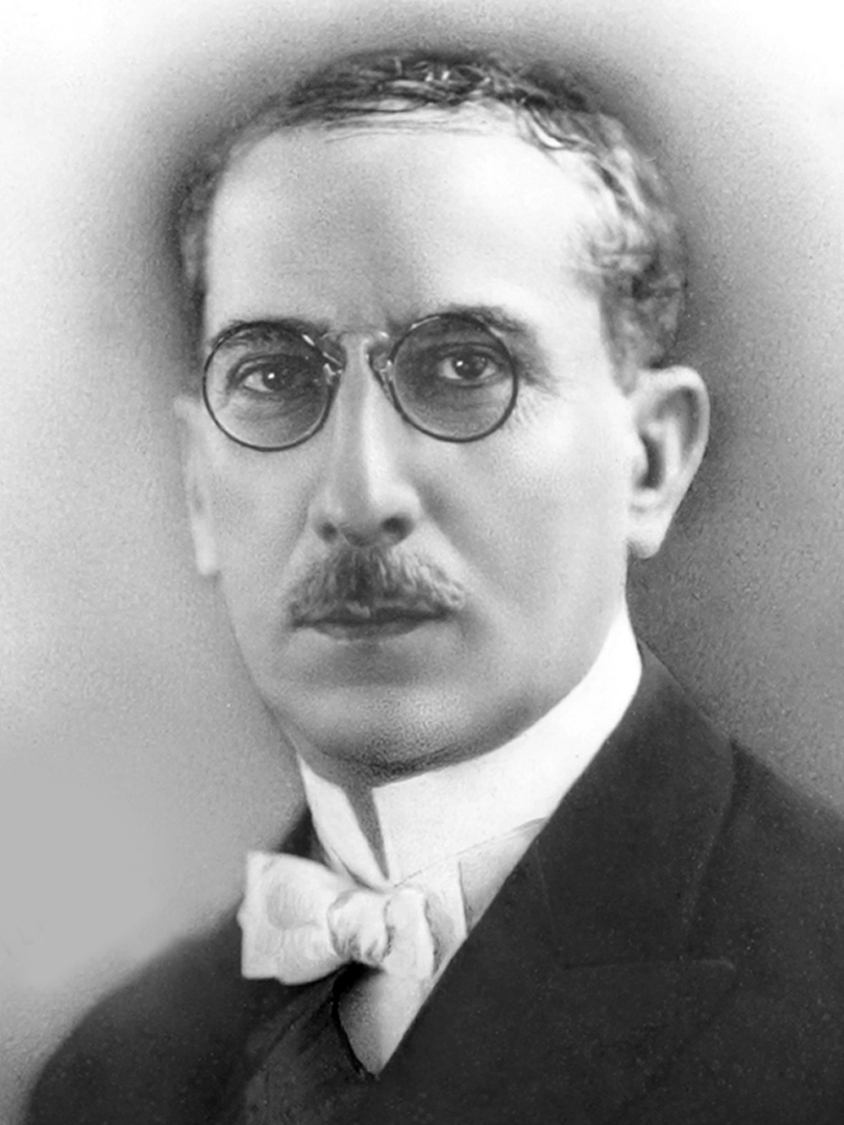

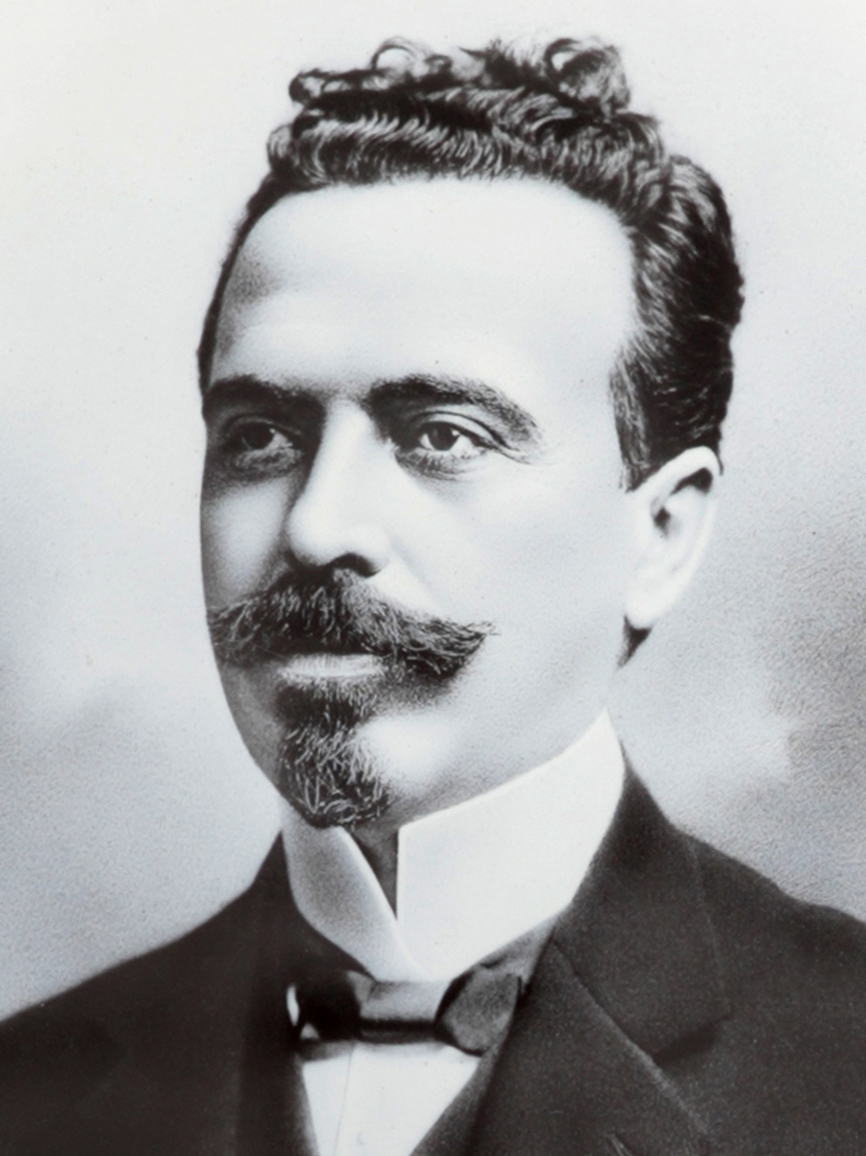
| Candidate | Artur Bernardes | Nilo Peçanha |
| Party | PRM | Republican Reaction |
| Popular vote | 466,877 | 317,714 |
| Percentage | 56.03% | 38.13% |
- Results by state
President before election
Epitacio Pessoa
PRM
Elected President
Artur Bernardes
PRM
- Vice president
- 22 August 1922
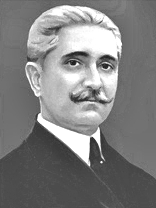

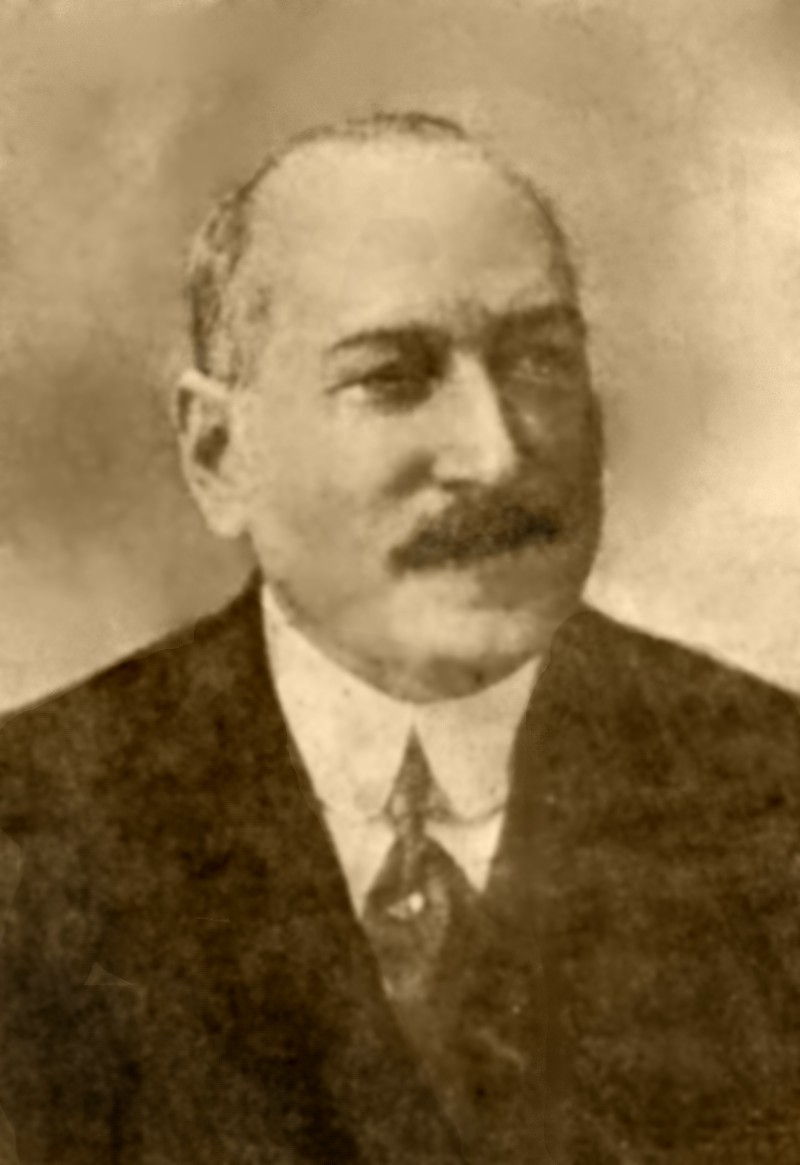
| Candidate | Estácio Coimbra | J. J. Seabra |
| Party | PRM | Republican Reaction |
| Popular vote | 295,787 | 790 |
| Percentage | 99.73% | 0.27% |
Vice President before election
Bueno de Paiva
PRM
Elected Vice President
Estácio Coimbra
PRM

Presidential and vice presidential elections were held in Brazil on 1 March 1922. The presidential election resulted in a victory for Artur Bernardes of the Mineiro Republican Party, who received 56% of the vote.

== Results ==
=== President ===
| Candidate | Party | Votes | % |
|---|---|---|---|
| Artur Bernardes | Mineiro Republican Party | 466,877 | 56.03 |
| Nilo Peçanha | Republican Reaction | 317,714 | 38.13 |
| Other candidates | | 48,679 | 5.84 |
| Total | | 833,270 | 100.00 |
| Registered voters/turnout | | 1,305,826 | – |
Source: Nohlen

=== Vice president ===
| Candidate | Party | Votes | % |
|---|---|---|---|
| Urbano Santos | Mineiro Republican Party | 447,595 | |
| J. J. Seabra | Republican Reaction | 330,529 | |
| Washington Luis | | 368 | |
| Carlos de Campos | | 61 | |
| Other candidates | | | |
| Total | | | |
Source: Prazeres

== Aftermath ==
Urbano Santos died before being sworn in as Vice President. A second vice presidential election was held on 22 August, which was won by Estácio Coimbra.

| Candidate | Party | Votes | % |
|---|---|---|---|
| Estácio Coimbra | Mineiro Republican Party | 295,787 | |
| J. J. Seabra | Republican Reaction | 790 | |
| Other candidates | | | |
| Total | | | |
Source: ICUB
