= Republican Reaction =

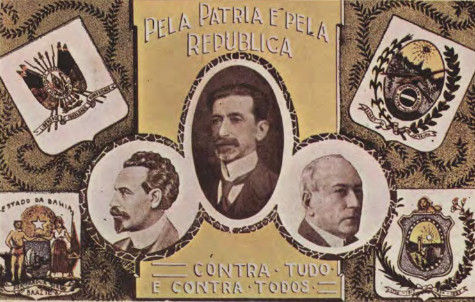
Postcard from supporters of Nilo Peçanha, Borges de Medeiros, and J. J. Seabra, featuring the coats of arms of the states participating in the alliance

The Republican Reaction (Portuguese: Reação Republicana) was a political alliance formed in June 1921 to contest the 1922 presidential elections in Brazil. Led by Nilo Peçanha, the movement launched an opposition candidacy against the official ticket supported by President Epitácio Pessoa, which consisted of Artur Bernardes, for president, and Urbano Santos, for vice president.

The Republican Reaction brought together dissident oligarchies from states such as Rio de Janeiro, Rio Grande do Sul, Bahia, and Pernambuco, in opposition to the political dominance of Minas Gerais and São Paulo—a hallmark of the so-called "coffee-with-milk" politics.

== Background ==
The 1922 presidential succession revealed tensions between Brazil's major and mid-sized states, amidst the crisis of the First Brazilian Republic's oligarchic system. The "Republican Reaction" emerged as a challenge to the "politics of the governors" and the political dominance exercised by the oligarchies of Minas Gerais and São Paulo. The movement also reflected the social and political transformations of the 1920s, a decade marked by growing urban demands, military dissatisfaction, and the emergence of new cultural and political movements in the country.

== Formation ==
The Republican Reaction was officially launched on 24 June 1921, during a meeting held at the Centro Rio-Grandense in Rio de Janeiro. On that occasion, the ticket comprising Nilo Peçanha for president and J. J. Seabra for vice-president was announced.

The movement's manifesto criticized the process by which the major states selected the pro-government candidate and advocated for greater autonomy for the Legislative Branch, the valuing of the Armed Forces, and financial balance for the federal government.

== Electoral campaign ==
The Republican Reaction campaign was notable for its national reach and intense political mobilization. Aboard the ship Íris, Nilo Peçanha toured the states of Amazonas, Pará, Maranhão, Piauí, Ceará, Rio Grande do Norte, Pernambuco, Paraíba, Alagoas, Sergipe, Bahia, Espírito Santo, and the Federal District, holding rallies and forging political alliances. The movement sought to broaden its support base among urban sectors, the military, Freemasons, and feminist groups.

The campaign employed a rhetoric of political renewal and criticism of the concentration of power in the hands of dominant oligarchies. Nilo Peçanha advocated for greater popular participation and the expansion of public education.

== 1922 presidential election ==
The elections took place on 1 March 1922, amidst allegations of electoral fraud and intense political tension. Victory went to the pro-government ticket of Artur Bernardes and Urbano Santos.

The Republican Reaction initially refused to accept the result, advocating for the creation of a "Court of Honor" to review the electoral process. Since Bernardes was not due to take office until 15 November, members of the Reaction remained active in the ensuing months, attempting to mobilize public opinion and reverse the situation. During this period—on 5 July 1922—young military officers rebelled at the Copacabana Fort; although suppressed, this uprising marked the beginning of the Tenentist movement.

Despite its electoral defeat, the Republican Reaction signaled a major crisis in the First Republic's political system and foreshadowed the conflicts that would culminate in the Revolution of 1930.
