= Fluminense Republican Party =

Fluminense Republican Party Partido Republicano Fluminense
- Historical leaders: Floriano Peixoto, Nilo Peçanha
- Founded: November 13, 1888
- Dissolved: December 2, 1937
- Headquarters: Rio de Janeiro, Brazil
- Ideology: Coronelism; Agrarianism; Florianism; National conservatism Social conservatism Economic liberalism
- Political position: Centre-right
- International affiliation: None

The Fluminense Republican Party (Portuguese: Partido Republicano Fluminense, PRF) was a Brazilian political party founded on 13 November 1888 to represent the republican ideals of the agrarian elite of Rio de Janeiro. Its principal representative was the Florianist Nilo Peçanha, President of the Republic from 1909 to 1910. The moderate wing, led by governor and senator José Thomaz da Porciúncula, and linked to the São Paulo directorate was hostile to Florianism and did not support him.

In common with all of the parties of the República Velha, the PRF was abolished shortly after the inauguration of the Estado Novo by Decree-Law No. 37, 2 December 1937.
