= Alberto Torres (politician) =

Brazilian politician and social thinker

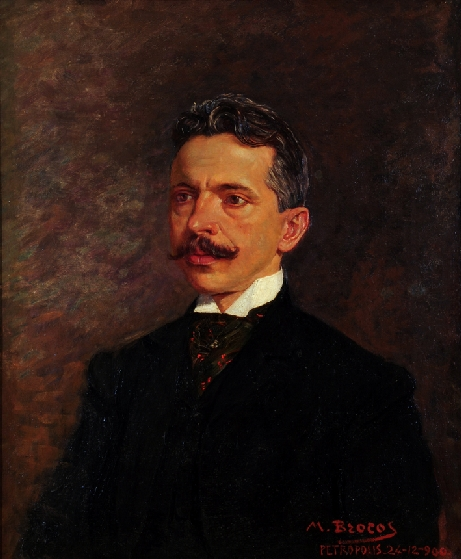

Personal details
- Born: 26 November 1865 Itaboraí, Brazil
- Died: 29 March 1917 (aged 51) Rio de Janeiro, Brazil

Alberto Torres (26 November 1865 – 29 March 1917) was a Brazilian politician and social thinker who was concerned about national unity and the organization of the society of Brazil.

In his work, he opposed the ideas of socialism and individualism as incompatible with the Brazilian reality and believed them to be responsible for the disintegration of society. He believed that objectively understanding Brazilian society is necessary to know its needs and to present pragmatic changes to it.

To do so, a strong state must lead changes.

His ideas were very much in use during Revolution of 1930 and the 1964 Brazilian coup d'état.

His daughter Heloísa Alberto Torres was a Brazilian anthropologist and museum director.

== Works ==
- O problema nacional brasileiro
- A organização nacional
- As fontes da vida no Brasil, 1915
