= Nilo Peçanha =

President of Brazil from 1909 to 1910

His Excellency Nilo Peçanha
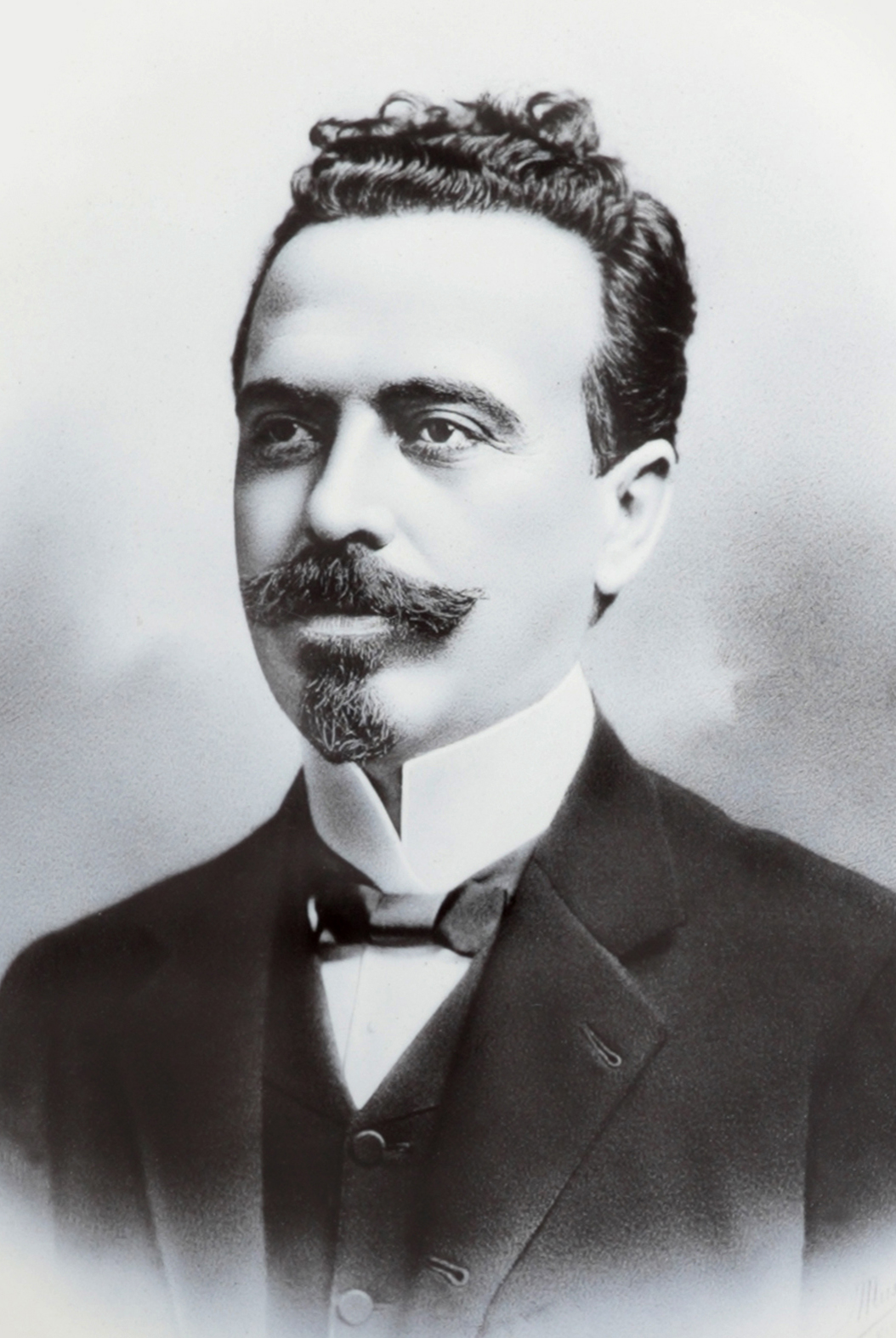
- Official portrait, 1909

7th President of Brazil
- In office 14 June 1909 – 15 November 1910
- Vice President: None
- Preceded by: Afonso Pena
- Succeeded by: Hermes da Fonseca

5th Vice President of Brazil
- In office 15 November 1906 – 14 June 1909
- President: Afonso Pena
- Preceded by: Afonso Pena
- Succeeded by: Venceslau Brás
Executive offices
Minister of External Relations
In office 7 May 1917 – 15 November 1918
| President | Venceslau Brás |
| Preceded by | Lauro Müller |
| Succeeded by | Domício da Gama |
President of Rio de Janeiro
In office 31 December 1914 – 7 May 1917
| Vice President | 1. Francisco Guimarães; 2. Agnelo Collet; 3. Leite Pinto |
| Preceded by | Oliveira Botelho |
| Succeeded by | Francisco Guimarães |
In office 31 December 1903 – 1 November 1906
| Vice President | 1. Oliveira Botelho; 2. Alves de Oliveira; 3. Marcondes Machado |
| Preceded by | Quintino Bocaiuva |
| Succeeded by | Oliveira Botelho |
Legislative offices
Senator for Rio de Janeiro
In office 3 May 1921 – 31 March 1924
| Preceded by | Almeida Batista |
| Succeeded by | Joaquim Moreira |
In office 3 May 1912 – 31 December 1914
| Preceded by | Oliveira Figueiredo |
| Succeeded by | Miguel de Carvalho |
In office 3 May 1903 – 29 December 1903
| Preceded by | Rangel Pestana |
| Succeeded by | Oliveira Figueiredo |
Member of the Chamber of Deputies
In office 18 November 1890 – 30 December 1902
| Constituency | Rio de Janeiro |

Personal details
- Born: 2 October 1867 Campos dos Goytacazes, Rio de Janeiro, Empire of Brazil
- Died: 31 March 1924 (aged 56) Rio de Janeiro, Federal District, Brazil
- Party: Rio Republican Party
- Spouse: Anita de Castro Belisário de Sousa (m. 1895)
- Children: 3
- Education: Faculty of Law of Recife
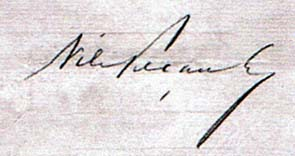
- Signature

Nilo Procópio Peçanha (Portuguese pronunciation: [ˈnilu pɾoˈkɔpju peˈsɐɲɐ]; 2 October 1867 – 31 March 1924) was a Brazilian politician who served as the seventh president of Brazil. He was governor of Rio de Janeiro (1903–1906), then elected the fifth vice president of Brazil in 1906. He assumed the presidency in 1909 following the death of President Afonso Pena and served until 1910.

Despite controversies involving his racial identity, Peçanha is frequently considered as Brazil's first Afro-Brazilian president.

== Early life ==
Nilo Peçanha was born to Sebastião de Sousa Peçanha, a baker, and Joaquina Anália de Sá Freire, the descendant of a wealthy and noble family from northern Rio de Janeiro Province. He was one of seven siblings (five boys and two girls). His family lived in a state of poverty in the remote and poor neighborhood of Morro do Coco, Campos dos Goytacazes, and moved to the downtown area when Peçanha started elementary education.

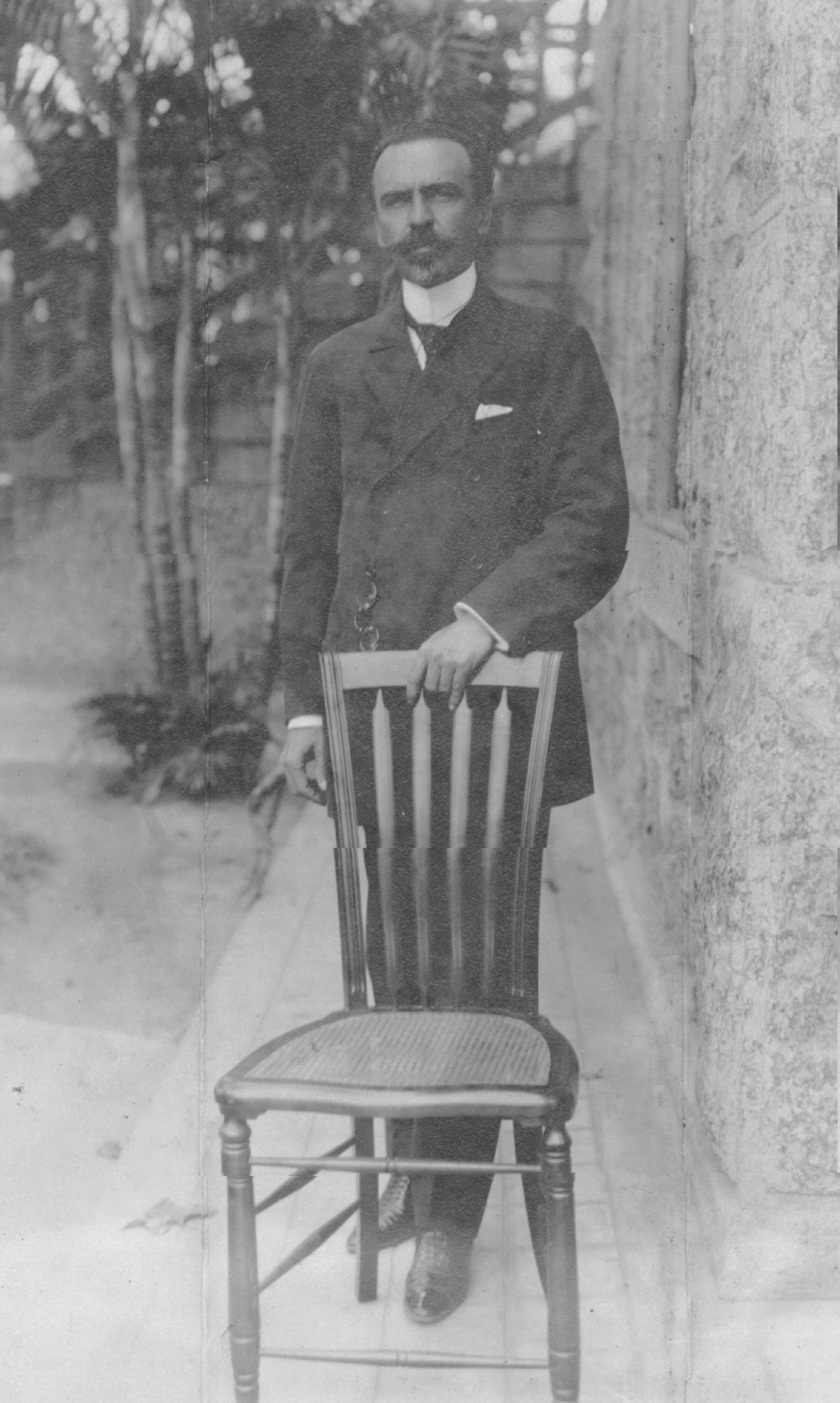
Nilo Pecanha in an amateur photo

He was frequently described as being a mulatto and often ridiculed in the press for his skin color. During his youth, the local Campos dos Goytacazes social elite alluded to him as the "mestiço do Morro do Coco" (the half-breed from Morro do Coco district). In 1921, when he ran for the Presidency of Republic, letters falsely attributed to the other candidate Artur Bernardes were published by the press and caused a political crisis because they insulted both the former president Marshal Hermes da Fonseca and also Peçanha, another former president, claiming he was a mulatto. Gilberto Freyre mentioned his "mulatismo" in Brazilian politics as the same that prevailed in Brazilian soccer. According to some scholars, his presidential photographs were touched up to whiten his dark skin.

Some scholars assert that, despite his tez escura (dark skin color), Nilo Peçanha always hid his black origins, and to this day his descendants and family have denied that he was a mulatto. His official biography written by a relative, Celso Peçanha, did not mention his racial origins, but another later biography, does so, thus some scholars express doubts.

After finishing his primary studies in his home city, Peçanha went on to study at the Law Schools of São Paulo and Recife, where he earned his degree.

Peçanha was married to Ana de Castro Belisário Soares de Sousa, also known as "Anita", the descendant of an aristocratic and wealthy family from his birth city. She was a daughter of lawyer João Belisário Soares de Souza and of Ana Rachel Ribeiro de Castro, who was herself a daughter of the Viscount of Santa Rita, one of the richest men in northern Rio de Janeiro State. The marriage was a social scandal since the bride escaped her house to marry her poor and "mulatto" groom, despite his status as a promising young politician.

He worked as a lawyer and a university teacher in the Faculdade Livre de Direito do Rio de Janeiro.

During the final years of the Empire of Brazil, he rose to prominence as a propagandist for the proclamation of the republic and for the abolition of slavery. He, like many young brazilian politicians at the time, had liberal views. He started his formal political career as an elected member of the first Republican Constituent Assembly in 1890. His political career advanced rapidly as a protégé of Campos Sales, who became President in 1898. In 1903 he was successively elected Senator and then President (Governor) of the state of Rio de Janeiro, remaining in the latter position until 1906. During his governorship, he instituted an administration that was highly economical about using public funds. He was elected vice-president under President Afonso Pena, where he was one of the signatories of the Taubaté Agreement. Having a close relationship with Pinheiro Machado, Pena was not confident enough to trust him as his presidential successor. His reputation as an able-political manoeuvrer made him suspicious figure, and was opposed by his government which the republic supported.

In 1909, Afonso Pena died, allowing Peçanha to assume the presidency in which his motto was “Paz e Amor” (Peace and Love).

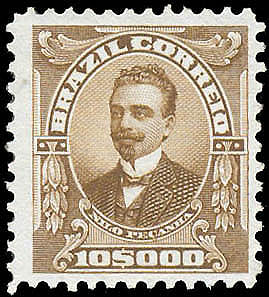
Postage stamp of Nilo Pecanha

== Presidency (1909–1910) ==
=== Administration ===
In administrative matters, the Ministry of Transport continued carrying out the road building that had been starting under Pena, while in the ministry of finance, Leopoldo de Bulhões discontinued the previous minister, Davi Campista's financial measures. Influx of European gold was exceeding the legal limit of foreign deposits allowed in Brazil, in response, Bullhoes increased the maximum cap of foreign deposits to 60 million pounds, and set the conversion rate to 16 pence. He also paid off loans that had been inherited from the Campos Sales administration.

The balance of power of the First Brazilian Republic was a compromise of the governing elites of the states of Minas Gerais and São Paulo. The deceased president, Afonso Pena, was elected with the support of this political alliance, but Peçanha assumed the presidency through being his vice-president and friction between the state oligarchies intensified. His government was also marked by friction with José Gomes Pinheiro Machado, the most powerful political leader of the Conservative Republican Party.

Peçanha carved a practical and non-doctrinaire course between the positivists and the idealistic adherents of a pure Republican system that fought each other during the first decades of Brazilian Republic. He was renowned for anticipating all the movements of his adversaries and achieving good political outcomes even when the odds were not favorable.

During his presidency, Peçanha created the Ministry of Agriculture, Commerce and Industry, as well as the Indian Protection Service (SPI) and inaugurated the first system of technical schools in Brazil. He also began a basic sanitation program in the Baixada Fluminense region. He fought the excesses of workers in the public service and the high government expenditures that caused the elevation of taxes.

=== Build-up to 1910 election ===
By the time he had ascended to presidency, the candidates for the 1910 election had already been decided. As a result, tensions between the two candidates and their factions were high in his presidency.

Ruy Barbosa started a run for the presidency promoting the Campanha Civilista against Marshal Hermes da Fonseca's Campanha Salvadora, and attracted the opposition and discontent of the military.

== Post-presidency and death ==
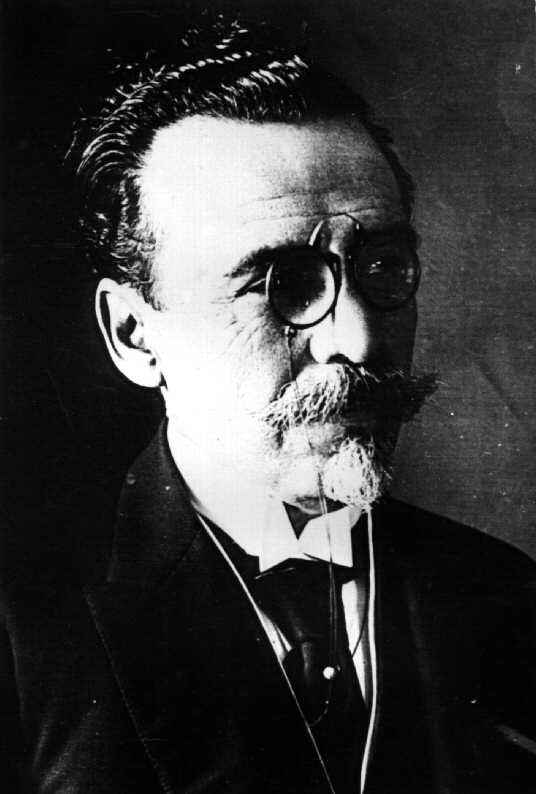
Last official photo of Nilo Pecanha

At the end of his mandate, he returned to the Senate and two years later was again elected President (Governor) for the state of Rio de Janeiro. He gave up this post in 1917 to take up the position of Minister of Foreign Relations and during his rule Brazil declared war against the Central Powers in World War I. In 1918, he was again elected to the Senate.

In 1921 he was a leader of the Republican Reaction alliance which had the goal of championing the politics of liberalism against those of the state oligarchies. His run for the presidency was supported by the state governments of Rio Grande do Sul, Rio de Janeiro and Pernambuco, and also by a large part of the military. The campaign was fierce with mutual attacks and the famous case of letters falsely attributed to candidate Artur Bernardes which insulted the military and the former president Marshal Hermes da Fonseca. Brazil was divided and despite the strong support, Peçanha was defeated by Artur Bernardes, the pro-government candidate in the presidential election of 1922.

Peçanha died in 1924 in Rio de Janeiro, Federal District, retired from political life. His nephew, Celso Peçanha, later served as the acting Governor of Rio de Janeiro from 1961 to 1962.

== Ministers ==
| 1 | Agriculture, Industry and Trade | Antônio Cândido Rodrigues |
| 1 | Agriculture, Industry and Trade | Francisco Sá |
| 1 | Agriculture, Industry and Trade | Rodolfo Nogueira da Rocha Miranda |
| 2 | Farm (Economy) | José Leopoldo de Bulhões Jardim |
| 3 | War | Luís Mendes de Morais |
| 3 | War | Carlos Eugênio de Andrade Guimarães |
| 3 | War | José Bernardino Bormann |
| 4 | Justice and Internal Affairs | Augusto Tavares de Lira |
| 4 | Justice and Internal Affairs | Esmeraldino Olímpio Torres Bandeira |
| 5 | Navy | Alexandrino Faria de Alencar |
| 6 | Foreign Affairs | José Maria da Silva Paranhos Júnior |
| 7 | Road and Public Works | Miguel Calmon du Pin e Almeida |
| 7 | Road and Public Works | Francisco Sá |

== See also ==
- List of presidents of Brazil

== Bibliography ==
- KOIFMAN, Fábio, Organizador - Presidentes do Brasil, Editora Rio, 2001.
- PEÇANHA, Celso, Nilo Peçanha e a Revolução Brasileira, Editora Civilização Brasileira, 1969.
- SILVA, Hélio, Nilo Peçanha – 7º Presidente do Brasil, Editora Três, 1983.
- SANTIAGO, Sindulfo, Nilo Peçanha, uma Época Política, Editora Sete, 1962.
- Tinoco, Brígido (1962). A vida de Nilo Pecanha.

Political offices
| Preceded by Afonso Pena | Vice President of Brazil; 1906–1909 | Succeeded by Venceslau Brás |
| Preceded by Afonso Pena | President of Brazil; 1909–1910 | Succeeded by Hermes da Fonseca |
