= Republic of the Sword =

Era of Brazilian history, 1889–1894

- 15 November 1889 – 15 November 1894
Second reign	First Brazilian Republic
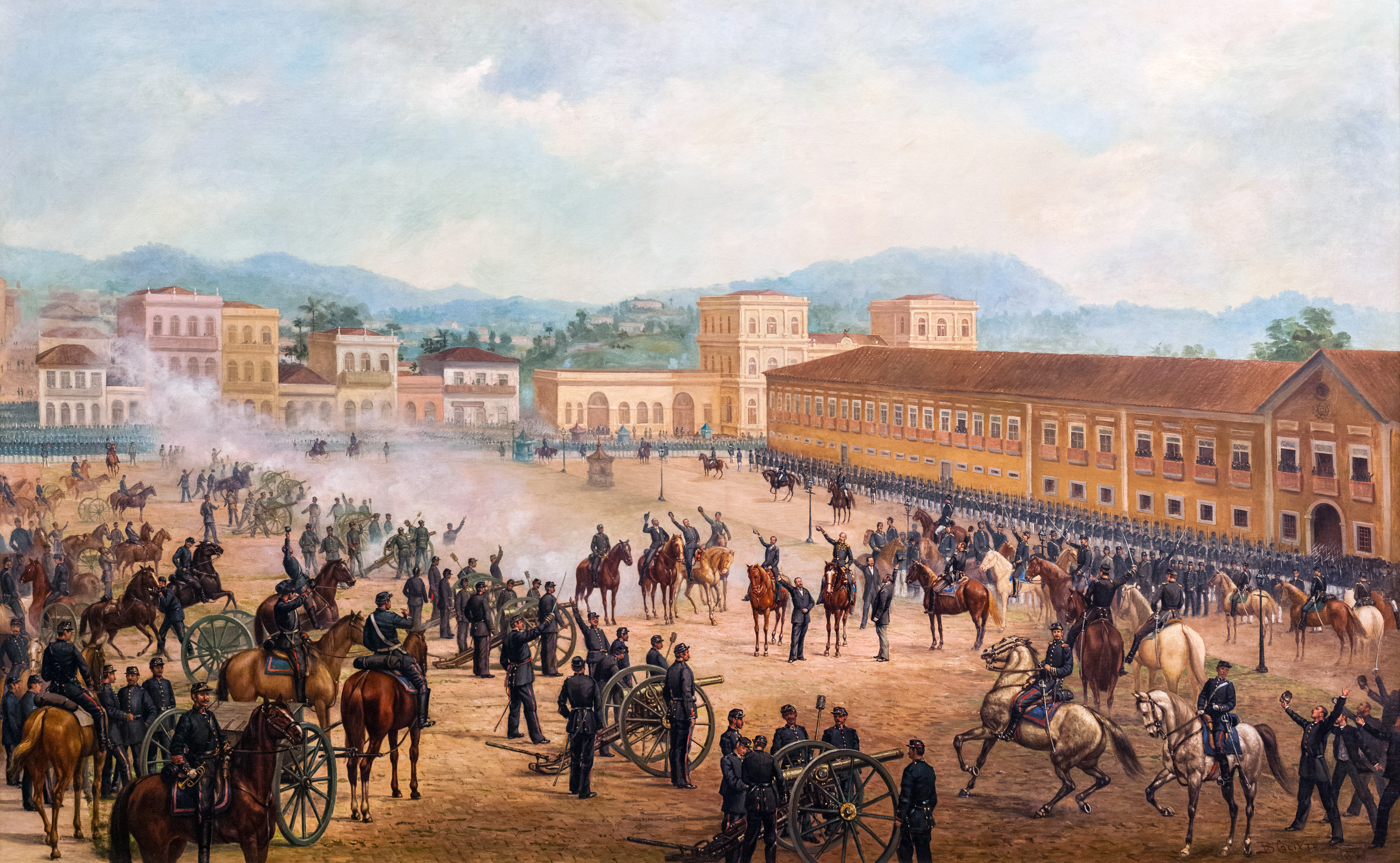
- President(s): Deodoro da Fonseca (1891); Floriano Peixoto (1891–1894)
- Key events: Coup of November 3

The Republic of the Sword (Portuguese: República da Espada, Portuguese pronunciation: [ʁeˈpublikɐ da esˈpa.dɐ]) was the early period of the First Brazilian Republic, when it was ruled by Marshals Deodoro da Fonseca and Floriano Peixoto. It began in 1889 when Deodoro da Fonseca launched a military coup against the Empire of Brazil, leading to the Proclamation of the Republic. The first two years of the republic were dictatorial under Fonseca, until a new constitution was promulgated in 1891, and he was elected president. Fonseca was not able to adjust to sharing power with Congress and dissolved it on 3 November 1891. The act was widely perceived as an authoritarian attempt to concentrate power, triggering a severe political crisis and alienating civilian and military supporters, including then Vice President Floriano Peixoto and influential Navy officers. Faced with mounting opposition and threats of civil war, Fonseca was forced to resign on 23 November 1891 leading to Peixoto's rise to power.

The Republic of the Sword was also marked by an economic crisis called the Encilhamento. Spearheaded by Finance Minister Ruy Barbosa, the government implemented expansionist monetary policies aimed at stimulating industrial growth, which led to unbridled speculation, inflation, and widespread economic instability. Investor confidence collapsed and the government's efforts to stabilize the currency failed. The crisis undermined the credibility of the new regime, constraining the Fonseca and Peixoto administrations, which also had to deal with political revolts and popular dissatisfaction with rising prices.

Floriano Peixoto took office amidst severe political instability and claims that his succession violated the constitutional requirement for new elections, as Deodoro da Fonseca had resigned less than halfway through his term. Known as the "Iron Marshal", Peixoto adopted an authoritarian stance to consolidate power and suppress the opposition. His government faced multiple revolts, most notably the Federalist Revolution and the Second Naval Revolt in 1893. Led by monarchist remnants and disgruntled officers demanding new elections, the revolt saw significant portions of the Brazilian Navy rise against the government, threatening the capital from Guanabara Bay. Lacking a comparable fleet, Peixoto refused to step down and relied on hastily armed merchant vessels and support from state militias to resist the rebels, maintaining control through emergency powers. His presidency also saw increasing political radicalization, especially among urban middle-class republicans known as the Jacobins. Fiercely loyal to the new republic, the Jacobins supported strong central authority and the exclusion of monarchists and oligarchs from power, viewing Peixoto as a national savior and demanding harsh measures against his opponents. The movement gained influence in Rio de Janeiro, where its members violently acted against perceived enemies of the Republic, which alarmed the elites and widened the ideological divide within the regime.

Despite repression, Peixoto's presidency laid the groundwork for stabilizing the fledgling republic. He left office in 1894 and was succeeded by Prudente de Morais, Brazil's first civilian president, who inherited an exhausted nation after thousands of deaths, marking the end of the so-called "Republic of the Sword". Tensions between civilians and the military remained high, and the new government faced the challenge of consolidating the legitimacy of civilian governance and the Encilhamento's aftermath. The transition shifted Brazil toward a more civilian-led, though oligarchic, political order characterized by regional power blocs and the dominance of rural elites, especially those of Minas Gerais and São Paulo, who went on to dominate the country's politics until the First Republic's fall in 1930.

== Background ==
After the Paraguayan War, the Brazilian military gained political influence. Emperor Pedro II's worsening health gradually removed him from his active role in politics, which caused tension between the imperial elite and the military as there was no moderating force between them. Pedro II's successor, Princess Isabel, had a husband which had a controversial personality. The church had also worn down the government to some extent.

In 1889, Deodoro da Fonseca, a marshal of the Brazilian Army, attended a meeting with prestigious civilian and military men who pressured him to begin a movement against the monarchy; there had been a rumor that he would be arrested. This resulted in him launching a coup d'état on 15 November 1891, which was bloodless and unopposed. It is unknown if whether on the day itself he had declared the birth of the republic, or had only removed the Prime Minister, the Viscount of Ouro Preto from power. Nonetheless, the republic would be founded.

== 1889–1891, Deodoro da Fonseca ==
The military men who had participated in the coup had sworn an oath to uphold the monarchy and overthrowing it was considered a treasonous act. Hence, after the coup, they needed to legitimize themselves. They decided to do so by stating that their actions were for the sake of Brazil, and not for the sake of regime change.

The military knew that a dictatorship would have to be in place for at least 5 years, and a more patriotic faction led by Floriano Peixoto believed that it should be longer. The new republic did not have enough popular support and could not risk popular elections. The first two years of the republic would be dictatorial under Deodoro da Fonseca.

Following the coup, Deodoro was chosen to be the leader of the newly created republic.

Many of the tasks that the new government had to solve were solved by executive decree, which drew criticism from republicans and non-republicans. The first decree that was issued stated that a federative republic would operate until the promulgation of a constitution. After this, came decrees that gave voting rights to the literate and those who enjoyed civil and political rights. The next decrees dissolved provincial assemblies which had been established under the empire, granted more power to state organs (e.g. Judiciary, Executive, Legislative), separated church and state, and reformed civil law under the judiciary and its code. A naturalization decree was also issued stating that any immigrants which had entered Brazil on 15 November 1889 or prior would be given full citizenship. Many of these reforms would later be added and expanded on in the constitution of 1891. The government would also begin attempting to resolve some of its other problems.

In the finance sector, Ruy Barbosa attempted to solve the finance issues that had been inherited from the monarchy; The monarchy had allegedly financed questionable banking concerns in its last years. His strategy was to allow various favored banks with inadequate assets to triple the nation's credit. However, speculation and inflation rose, and an economic crisis began, named the Encilhamento. Following the crisis, Brazil underwent a period of austerity measures, and its credit was only re-established after several years.

Five days after the creation of the new republic, Argentina and Uruguay recognised its sovereignty, followed by Chile in before the end of 1889. In 1890, most nations recognised the new republic, though it was icily received in Europe and with reservations in Britain.

Meanwhile, liberal forces pressed on the need of a constitution, and a commission to draw up a constitution was established as in 1889 as part of decree No.39, and a convention to begin writing it was held in 1890. The constitution was finished and promulgated in 1891.

=== Constitution ===
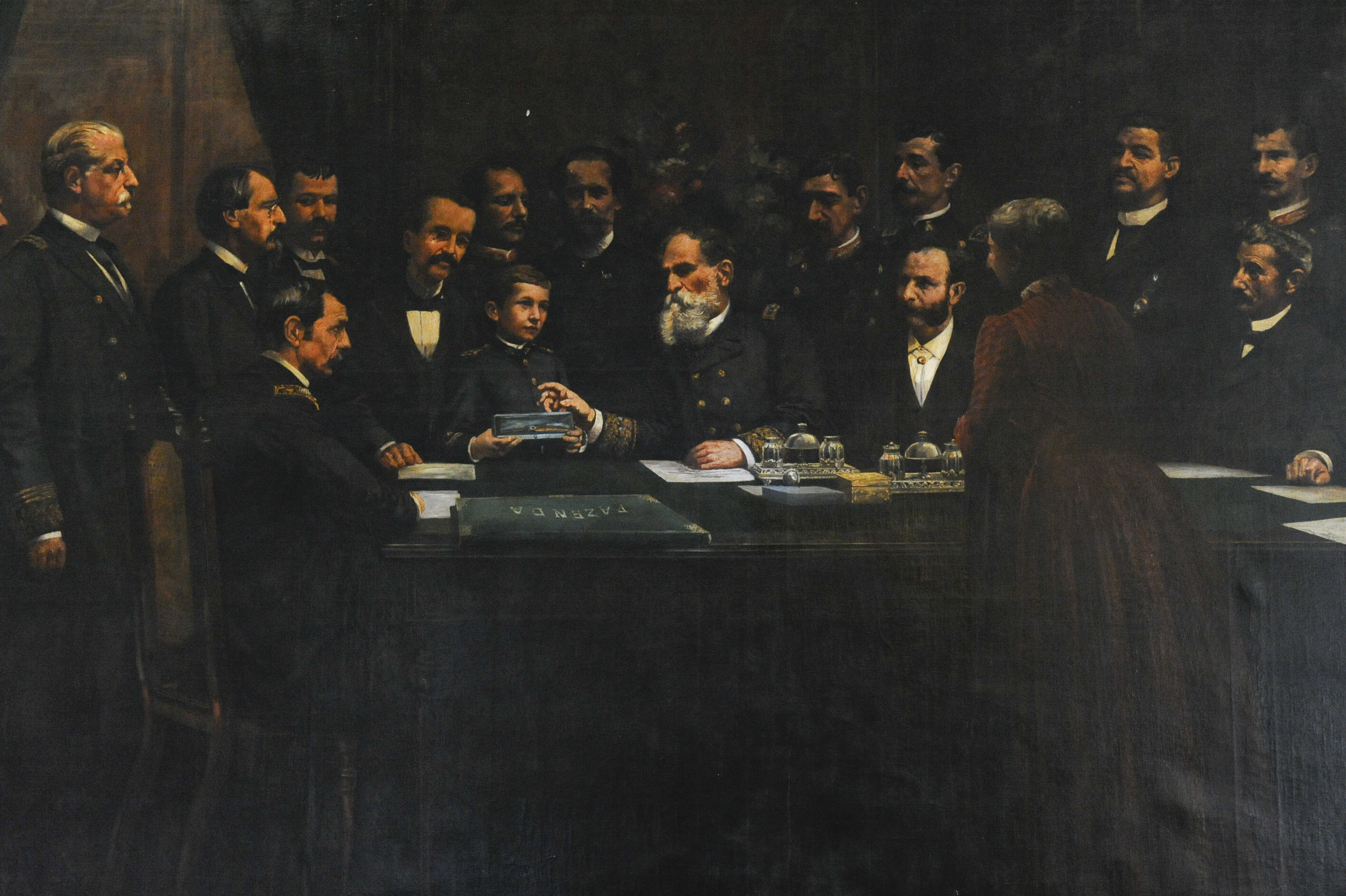
Fonseca signing the first constitutional draft, 1890

Two distinct forces clashed in the constitution of 1891. Those who were strongly opposed to the coffee oligarchy and aimed to intensify presidential authority, the radical Jacobins, and those who aimed to limit presidential power.

The new constitution decreed a federation that was governed by a president, a National Congress and a Judiciary. The constitution also gave voting rights to males 21 and above, with the exception of women and illiterates.

Article 14 of the constitution decreed the army and navy as permanent national institutions which were responsible for maintaining law and order, as well as to ensure the survival of the 3 governmental branches. The army was intended to the moderator of the system, and military officers were the only state elite that were constitutionally mandated. The article stated that the armed forces were to be loyal to the president, though they were allowed to be disobedient if they decreed that his actions were illegal.

=== Election ===
With the promulgation of the new constitution, an indirect election was held shortly after. Unlike future elections, presidential and vice-presidential elections were held simultaneously. For the presidential election, Deodoro won the presidency with 129 votes against Prudente de Morais' 97, while Floriano won the vice-presidency with 153 votes against Eduardo Wandenkolk's 57.

=== Coup of 3 November ===
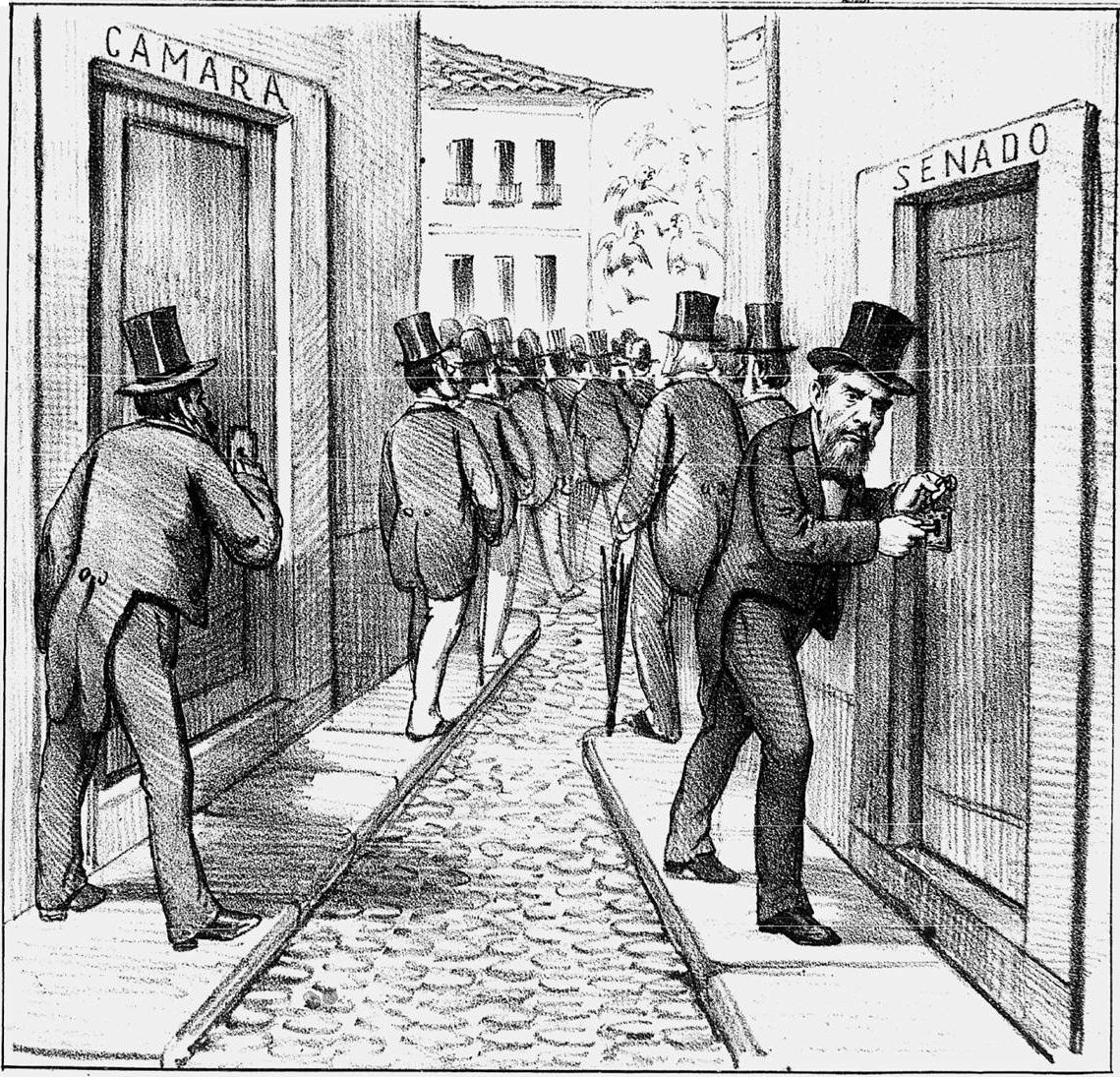
The dissolution of Congress, Revista Illustrada, 1892

After assuming office, tensions and disagreement between Deodoro da Fonseca and Congress increased. Fonseca lacked political skills, which alienated him from prominent figures in Brazilian politics. The president often acted on impulse and saw criticism of him in Congress as a personal attack. One his ministers had resigned in 1890, and the entire ministry, including Ruy Barbosa, Campos Sales, and Cesário Alvim resigned in 1891. These factors resulted in Fonseca closing congress and dissolving it, which provoked civilian and military protests in the 20 days that followed. In Pará, an uprising occurred, and in Rio Grande do Sul, a rebellion broke out, while a revolt also occurred in the Navy. In order to prevent further bloodshed, Fonseca resigned on 23 November 1891, and wrote a manifesto to explain why he had closed Congress:

"Extraordinary circumstances in which, I swear before God, I had no part have led to an exceptional and unforeseen situation. I assumed that I could avoid such a dangerous crisis by the dissolution of congress, a measure which I took with great reluctance, but responsibility for which I freely assume. I thought to direct the government of the state along a path which would save it from the disastrous effects of this crisis. But the conditions in which the country now finds itself, and the ingratitude of those for whom I sacrificed myself, and the desire not to kindle war in my dear country, make clear the wisdom of resigning my authority in the hands of my successor."

— Deodoro da Fonseca, his resignation manifesto

Floriano Peixoto, his vice president, succeeded him as president.

== 1891–1894, Floriano Peixoto ==
Ruined buildings in Villegagnon Island during the Second Naval Revolt

Upon taking office, Floriano Peixoto ousted all state governors that supported Deodoro da Fonseca, and replaced them with state governors that were loyal to him. He did so by using the military to oust the original state governors, as he lacked a constitutional way to replace them. Later president of Brazil, Epitaccio Pessoa, remarked on the events:

"Side-by-side with one large coup'd'tat, there were 20 smaller ones."

— Epitácio Pessoa

As a result of his unconstitutional actions, factions of opposition formed against him. Powerful conservative groups also opposed him, who were threatened by the unsound fiscal policies that the new government had taken up. Their dissatisfaction towards Floriano Peixoto was most seen in state legislatures, the press, and political gatherings. Floriano's enemies, often distorting and exaggerating his actions, alleged that he was planning to abolish elections and set-up a military dictatorship. These allegations were based on the fact that Floriano Peixoto refused to hold a special election to choose Deodoro's successor. Floriano and his supporters denounced the opposition, accusing that their true intentions were to restore the monarchy. However, it was not the political opposition that posed any major threat to the Peixoto administration, it was the military opposition that posed the most danger.

In January 1892, only 6 six weeks after Floriano had taken over, the personnel of two forts in the federal capital revolted against the government. In April, 13 generals of the army submitted a manifesto which called for the resignation of Floriano. They were imprisoned or exiled as a result. In Rio de Janeiro, São Paulo, Minas Gerais, Rio Grande do Sul, Maranhão, Amazonas, and Mato Grosso, revolts broke out. The revolt in Rio de Janeiro was particularly threatening, mainly because it was led by an able senator, Gaspar Silveira Martins, and because the headquarters of the rebellion were situated on the Uruguayan border, where the rebels could use foreign supply or even seek refuge. However, the opposition could not put aside its differences, and failed to form a united front against Floriano.

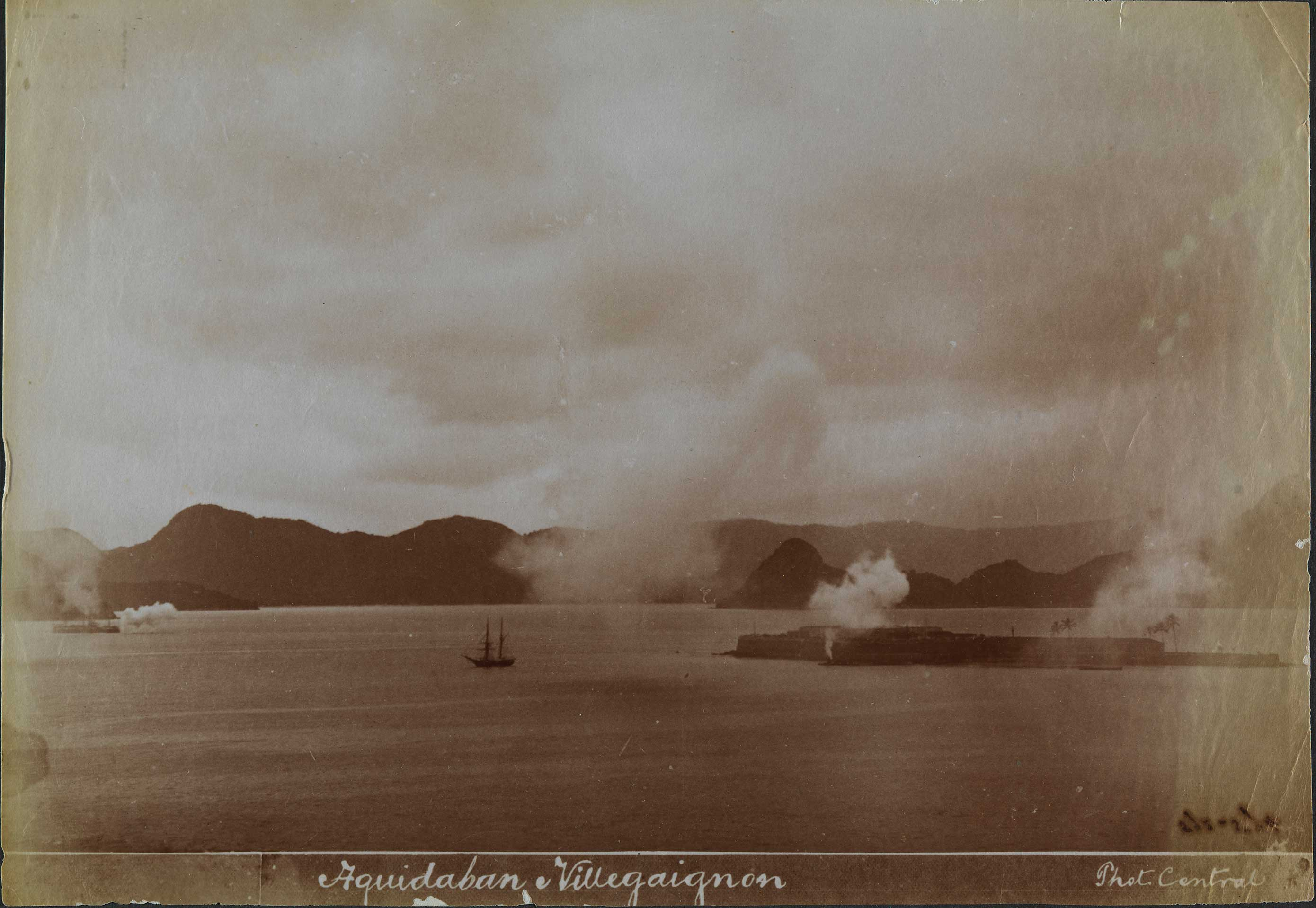
Photograph of the Battle of Guanabara Bay

In 1893, a second navy revolt occurred, where the rebels, led by Admiral Custódio José de Melo threatened to shell the capital. Salvador Mendonça, Brazil's diplomat to the United States, with the help of American businessman Charles Flint, assembled a fleet commanded by American crewmen, who managed to defeat the rebellion.

On land, a civil war broke out in Rio Grande do Sul, which later spread to Santa Catarina and Paraná. Though the conflict had local origins, Peixoto turned it into a national one by siding with the local governor Júlio de Castilhos. The civil war ended in 1895.

=== End of term ===
In 1894, Floriano Peixoto reached the end of his term, amidst the military's disunity and falling ill. A direct election was held after, and Prudente de Morais, a civilian spokesperson for the São Paulo coffee oligarchy, won the election. This ended the 5-year long period of military rule in Brazil and the Republic of the Sword.

== Aftermath ==
Following Prudente de Morais' election, the influence of the army was lowered. The Clube Militar was shut down between 1896 and 1901. Tensions between the military and civilians remained high, and no military presidents would be in power for the rest of the First Republic, excluding Hermes da Fonseca in 1910. Following the Encilhamento, austerity measures were taken by next two presidents, Prudente de Morais, and Campos Sales' to recover the Brazilian economy. The Brazilian economy would only begin fully recovering at the end of the latters' administration.

== Bibliography ==
- Fausto, Boris; Brakel, Arthur (2014). A concise history of Brazil. Cambridge concise histories (2nd ed.). Cambridge: Cambridge University Press. ISBN 978-1-107-63524-1.
- Hill, Lawrence F. (1947). Brazil. University of California Press.
- Bello, José Maria (1966). A History of Modern Brazil, 1889-1964. Stanford University Press. ISBN 978-0-8047-0238-6.
- Meade, Teresa A. (2010). A brief history of Brazil (2nd ed.). New York, NY: Checkmark Books. ISBN 978-0-8160-7788-5.
- Calogeras, João Pandía (1933-01-30). A History of Brazil. University of North Carolina Press. ISBN 978-0-8078-0296-0.
