= 1891 Brazilian presidential election =

- 25 February 1891
- Presidential election
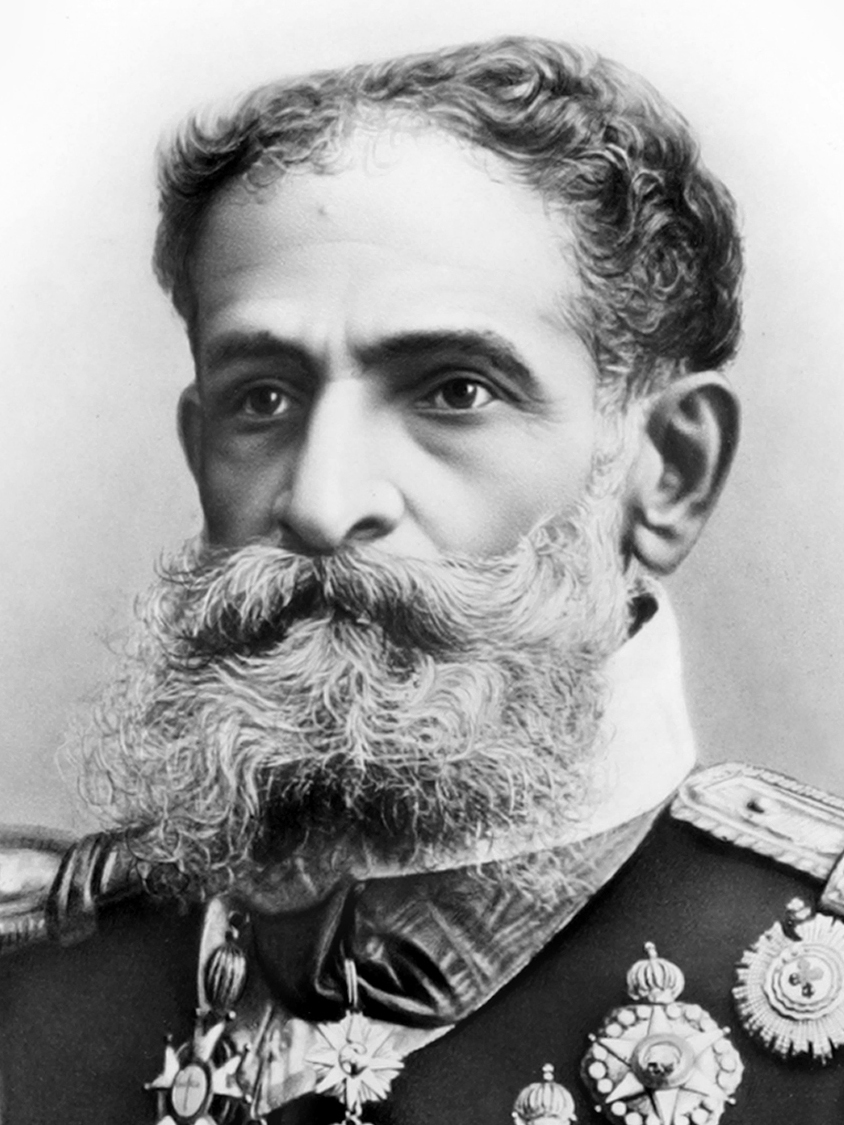

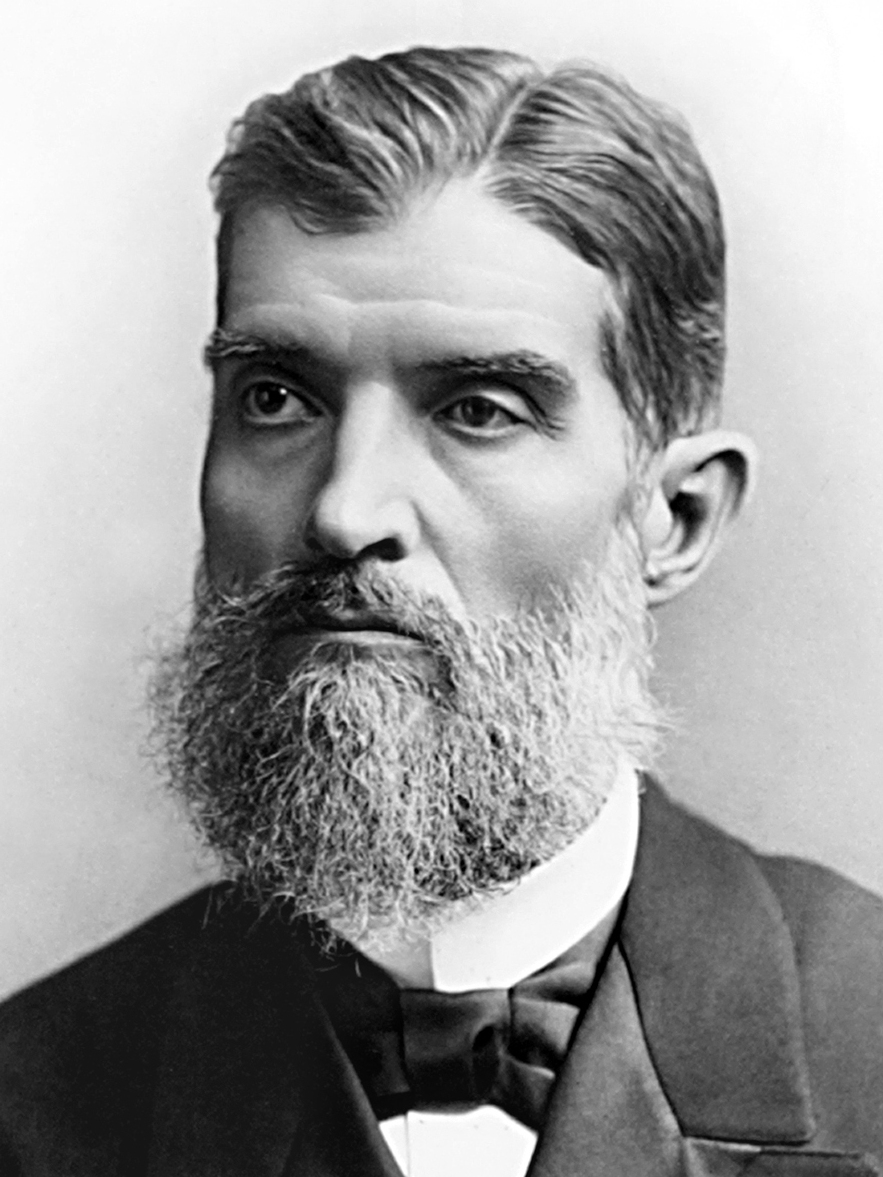
| Candidate | Deodoro da Fonseca | Prudente de Morais |
| Electoral vote | 129 | 97 |
| Percentage | 55.6% | 41.81% |
President before election
Deodoro da Fonseca (Provisional)
Elected President
Deodoro da Fonseca
- Vice presidential election
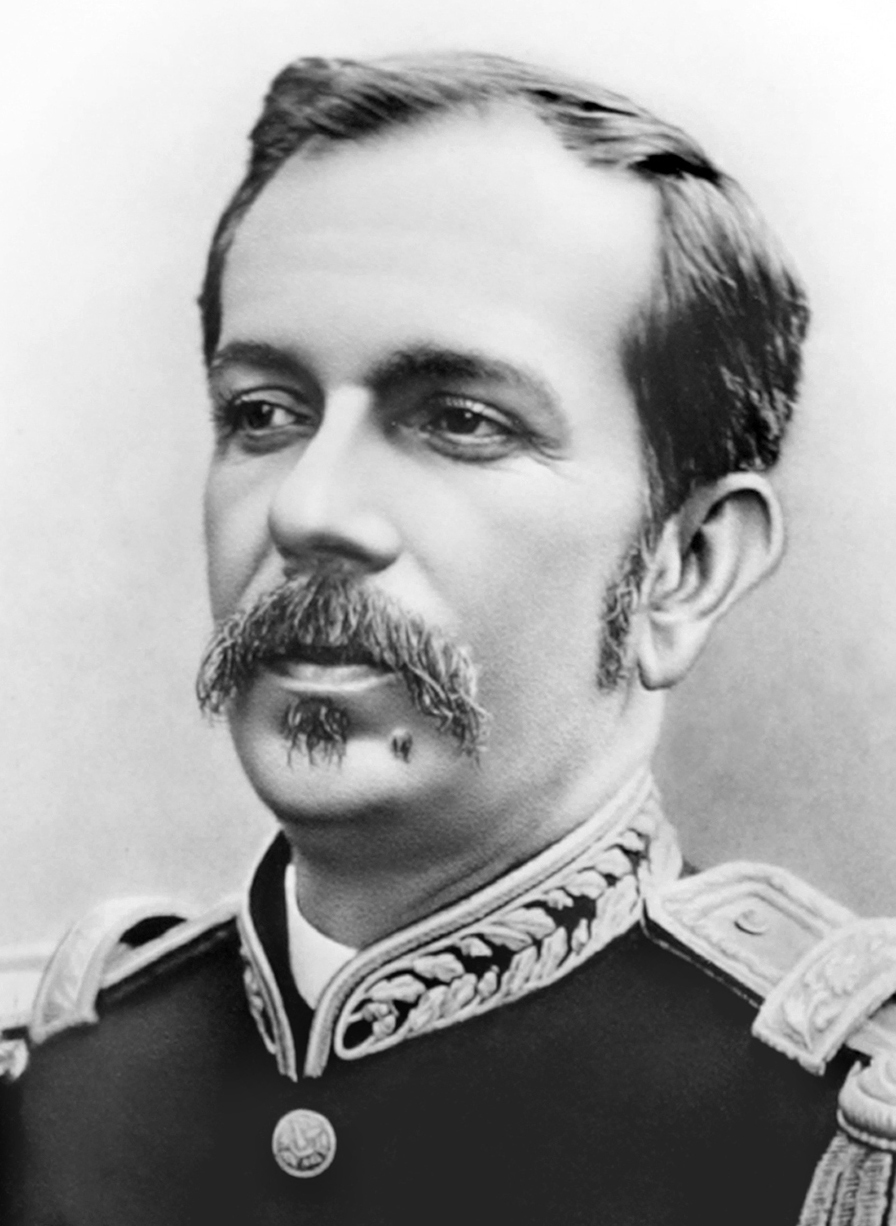

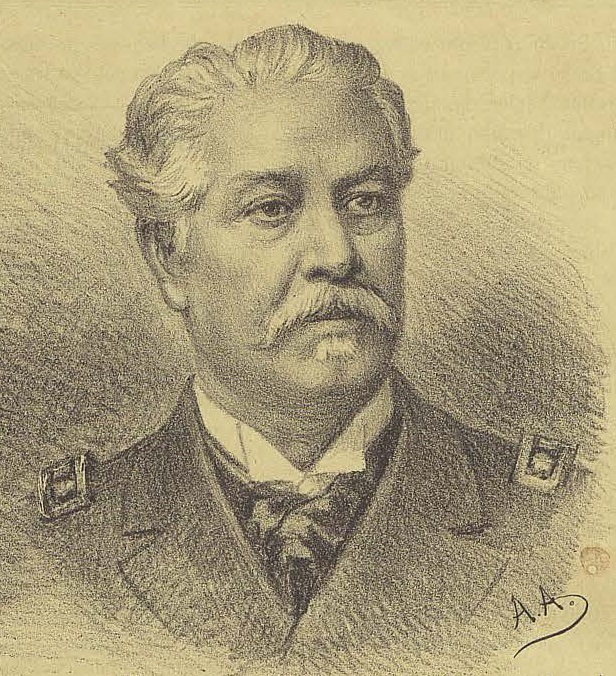
| Candidate | Floriano Peixoto | Eduardo Wandenkolk |
| Electoral vote | 153 | 57 |
| Percentage | 65.95% | 24.57% |
Vice president before election
None
Elected Vice president
Floriano Peixoto

Indirect presidential elections were held in Brazil on 25 February 1891. They were the first presidential elections in the country following the overthrow of the monarchy, with the president and vice president elected by members of Congress. Under the constitution promulgated by Congress on 24 February 1891, the elections were held the following day and the winners took office on 26 February.

Manuel Deodoro da Fonseca (who had been Head of the Provisional Government since 15 November 1889, when the monarchy was overthrown) was elected president, while Floriano Vieira Peixoto was elected vice president.

== Results ==
=== President ===
| Candidate | Votes | % |
|---|---|---|
| Deodoro da Fonseca | 129 | 55.60 |
| Prudente de Morais | 97 | 41.81 |
| Floriano Peixoto | 3 | 1.29 |
| Saldanha Marinho | 2 | 0.86 |
| José Higino Duarte Pereira | 1 | 0.43 |
| Total | 232 | 100.00 |
| Valid votes | 232 | 99.15 |
| Invalid/blank votes | 2 | 0.85 |
| Total votes | 234 | 100.00 |
| Registered voters/turnout | 268 | 87.31 |
Source: Prefeitura de Marechal Deodoro

=== Vice president ===
| Candidate | Votes | % |
|---|---|---|
| Floriano Peixoto | 153 | 65.95 |
| Eduardo Wandenkolk | 57 | 24.57 |
| Prudente de Morais | 12 | 5.17 |
| Coronel Piragibe | 5 | 2.16 |
| José de Almeida Barreto | 4 | 1.72 |
| Custódio de Mello | 1 | 0.43 |
| Total | 232 | 100.00 |
| Valid votes | 232 | 99.15 |
| Invalid/blank votes | 2 | 0.85 |
| Total votes | 234 | 100.00 |
| Registered voters/turnout | 268 | 87.31 |
Source: Migalhas
