= Coup of November 3 =

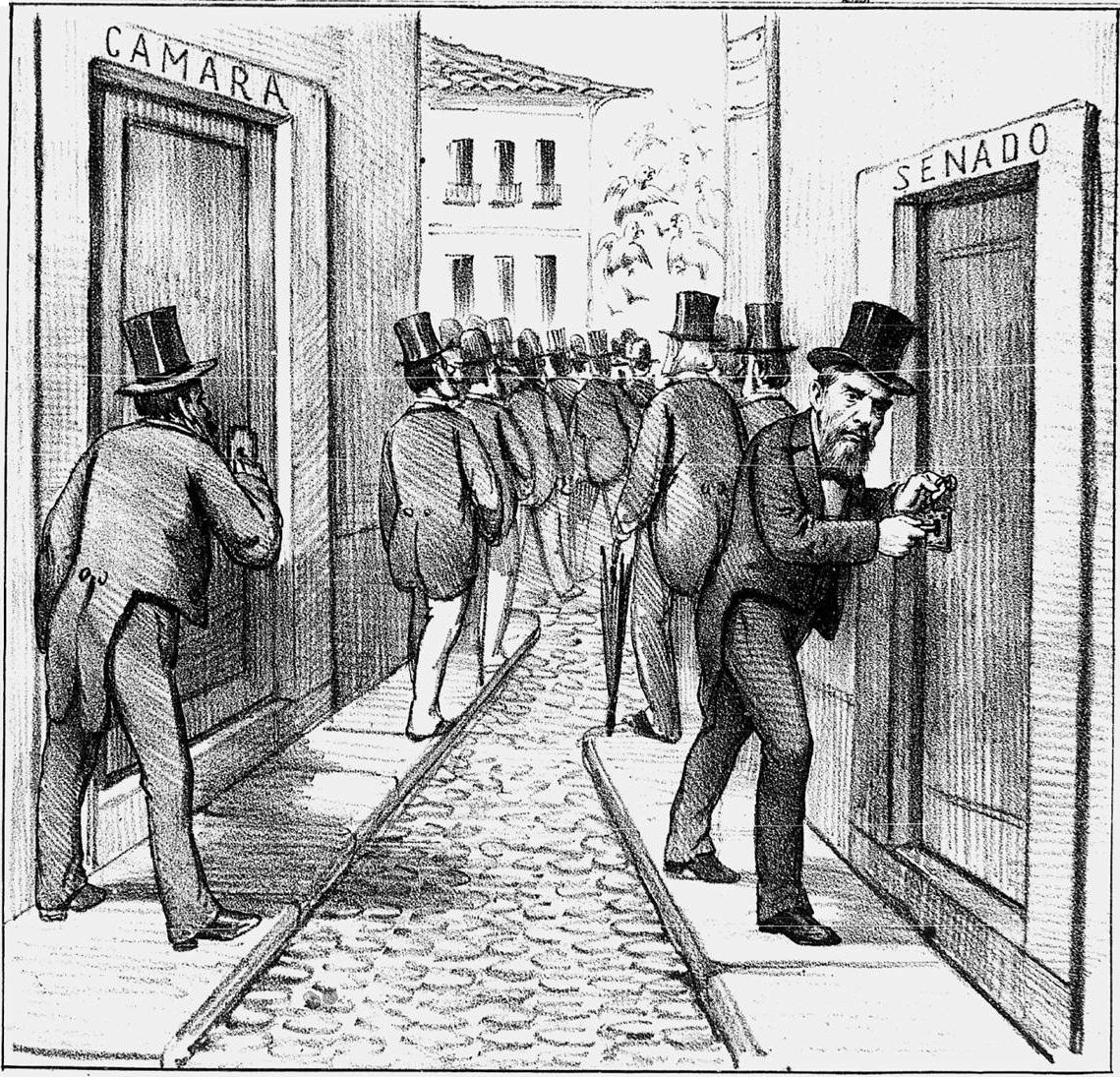
The dissolution of Congress, Revista Illustrada, 1892

The Coup of November 3 was carried out during the First Brazilian Republic by then-president Deodoro da Fonseca—who dissolved the National Congress on 3 November 1891. On that date, Fonseca signed two decrees: one dissolving Congress, and another establishing a state of emergency, which suspended all provisions of the new republican constitution concerning individual and political rights. From that moment on, any person could be arrested without the right to habeas corpus or a prior defense. On the same day, the Brazilian Army surrounded the Chamber of Deputies and the Senate, arresting political opponents and some of Fonseca's former allies, such as Quintino Bocaiuva. The coup is considered one of the triggers for the Federalist Revolution in Southern Brazil and the first naval revolt, when Admiral Custódio de Melo threatened to bombard Rio de Janeiro if Fonseca did not back down on the measures. Faced with mounting pressure, the president resigned on 23 November 1891, being succeeded by Vice President Floriano Peixoto.
