= Antônio Jacó da Paixão =

Brazilian lawyer, founding father (1842–1912)

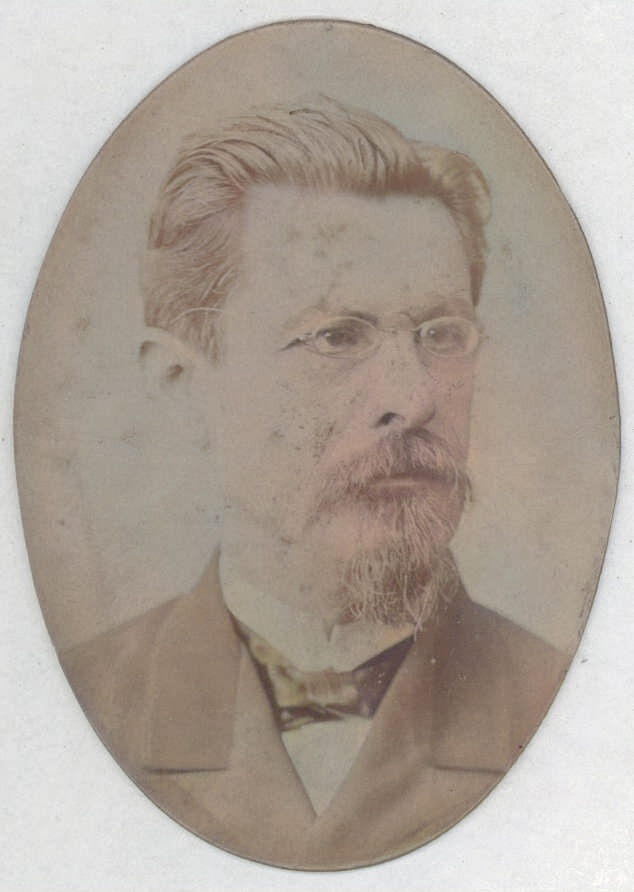
- Born: 28 November 1842
- Died: 26 September 1912 (aged 69)
- Father: Antonio Julio da Paixao

Antonio Jacó da Paixão (28 November 1842 — 26 September 1912) was a Brazilian politician and signatory of the Brazilian Constitution of 1891.

A lawyer, he graduated from the Legal and Social Sciences university of São Paulo (Now the Law School of the University of São Paulo) in 1875.
