= Falcão da Frota =

Brazilian military officer and Minister of War (1834–1900)

Antônio Nicolau Falcão da Frota

Minister of War
- Incumbent
- Assumed office 1891
- Preceded by: Floriano Peixoto
- Succeeded by: José Simeão de Oliveira

Personal details
- Born: 10 September 1834 Desterro, Empire of Brazil
- Died: 21 March 1900 (aged 65) Pelotas, Brazil
- Spouse: Ana do Vale e Almeida

Military service
- Branch/service: Brazilian Army

Antônio Nicolau Falcão da Frota (Desterro, 10 September 1834 — Pelotas, 21 March 1900) was a Brazilian military officer who served as Minister of War in 1891.
