= Saldanha Marinho =

Municipality in Rio Grande do Sul, Brazil

Coordinates: 28°24′S 53°06′W

- Municipality
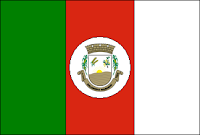
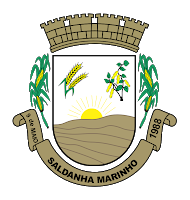
- Flag Coat of arms
- Interactive map of Saldanha Marinho
- Country: Brazil
- Time zone: UTC−3 (BRT)

Saldanha Marinho is a municipality in the state of Rio Grande do Sul, Brazil. As of 2020, the estimated population was 2,622.

== See also ==
- List of municipalities in Rio Grande do Sul
