= Brazilian Constitution of 1891 =

Brazilian statute between 1891-1934

- Constitution of the Republic of the United States of Brazil of 1891 held by the National Archives

Overview
- Jurisdiction: United States of Brazil
- Date effective: February 24, 1891
- System: Federative presidential republic

Government structure
- Branches: Three (executive, legislative, judiciary)
- Chambers: Bicameral: Federal Senate and the Chamber of Deputies.
- Executive: President of Brazil
- Judiciary: Supreme Federal Court
- Author: Constituent Assembly of 1891
- Signatories: Ruy Barbosa; Prudente de Morais; Campos Sales; Rodrigues Alves; Nilo Pecanha; Epitacio Pessoa; Borges de Medeiros; Eduardo Wandenkolk; Antônio Jacó da Paixão
- Supersedes: Brazilian Constitution of 1824
- Superseded by: Brazilian Constitution of 1934

Full text
- Constitution of the United States of Brazil (1891) at Wikisource

The Brazilian Constitution of 1891 (Portuguese: Constituição brasileira de 1891), also known Constitution of the Republic of the United States of Brazil (Constituição da República dos Estados Unidos do Brasil), promulgated on February 24, 1891, was the country's second constitution and the first of the republican period. The form of government became the Federative Republic, composed of twenty states (previously called provinces), and the Federal District (the city of Rio de Janeiro).

== Elaboration ==
In 1889, discussions about drafting a new constitution began. The text would become the first republican constitution and remain in force throughout the First Republic. After a year of negotiations with the branches of government responsible for ruling Brazil, the Brazilian Constitution of 1891 was promulgated on February 24, 1891. The main authors of the text were Prudente de Morais and Ruy Barbosa. The text was only amended in 1926.

The 1891 Constitution was inspired by the Constitution of the Argentine Nation, the Constitution of the United States of America and the Federal Constitution of Switzerland. It was characterized by the decentralization of powers, as it gave great autonomy to the municipalities and the former provinces, which became states. It established the existence of three independent branches of government: the Executive, the Legislative and the Judiciary. The old Moderator Power, symbol of the monarchy, was abolished. The members of the Legislative and Executive branches would be elected by direct popular vote, which characterized them as representatives of the citizens in national political life.

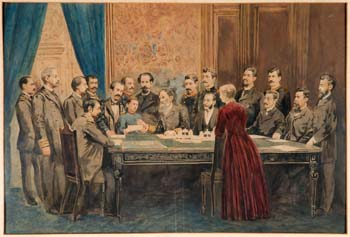
Gustave Hastoy: Signature of the draft 1891 Constitution, c. 1891. Casa de Rui Barbosa Foundation, Rio de Janeiro.

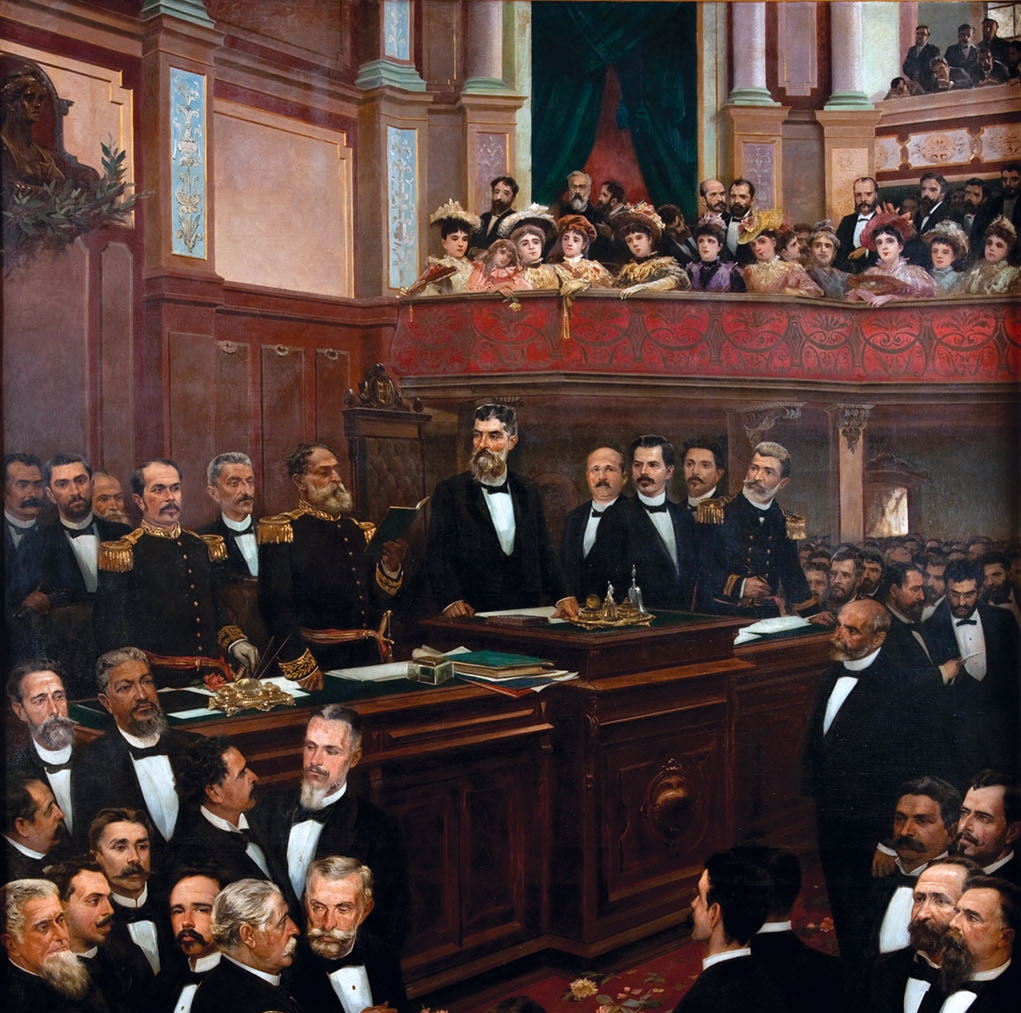
Aurélio de Figueiredo: Oath of the Constitution, c. 1891. Once the 1st Republican Constitution was promulgated, Marshals Manuel Deodoro da Fonseca and Floriano Peixoto took office.

The system of government chosen was presidentialism and the term of office of the President of the Republic, elected by direct vote, would be four years and without the right to re-election for the immediately following term; the same applied to the vice-president. At the time, the vice-president was elected independently of the presidential nominee, which allowed the selection of the opposition candidate. If a president died or resigned, his vice-president would only assume office until new elections were held, instead of serving until the end of the four-year term, as is the case today. The presidential elections took place in the last year of the presidential term, on March 1, and those elected were sworn in on November 15.

As for the electoral rules, it was determined that the vote in Brazil would remain non-secret (the voter's signature on the ballot became compulsory) and universal (the census suffrage, which defined voters by their income, was abolished, but illiterate people, religious people subject to ecclesiastical obedience and beggars were still excluded from the right to vote). The National Congress was responsible for regulating the system for elections to federal political office, and the state assemblies for regulating state and municipal elections, which would only change from the 1934 Constitution onwards with the creation of the Electoral Justice. District voting was maintained, with the election of three deputies for each electoral district in the country.

The separation of church and state was also defined: elections would no longer take place within churches, the government would no longer interfere in the choice of high clergy positions, such as bishops, deacons and cardinals, and the definition of a parish as an administrative unit - which was equivalent to a municipality as well as a district, village and comarca - was extinguished. Brazil no longer had an official religion and the monopoly on civil registrations was transferred to the federal government. Registry offices for birth, marriage and death registrations were created, as well as public cemeteries, where anyone could be buried, regardless of their creed. The federal government also assumed the control of education and established several public elementary and middle schools; the 1891 Constitution banned religious education in public establishments. The separation angered the church, which only reconciled with the government during the Estado Novo.

Nobility and private coats of arms were abolished and no aristocratic privilege was recognized; the most influential kept their symbols during the Republic out of respect and courtesy. Under the new constitution, Brazilians who accepted any foreign title that contradicted the republican precepts of the 1891 text, without the express authorization of Congress, would lose their political rights. The Imperial Order of the Cross and the Imperial Order of Avis were officially abolished and replaced by the National Orders of the Southern Cross and the Military Merit, but kept many of the characteristics of their predecessors.

The 1891 Constitution was drafted based on the fundamental principles of the US Constitution. However, the liberal democratic principles were suppressed because the landowning oligarchies, through their representatives, had a strong influence on the drafting of the text. The objective of the coffee growers of São Paulo was to increase the decentralization of power and strengthen regional oligarchies by weakening central power, especially the military. The influence of São Paulo, holder of the largest share of the Brazilian GDP at the time, was decisive. The first republican party was formed through the Convention of Itu.

The copy from the time with the signatures of the constituents is kept by the National Archives of Brazil.

== Main points ==
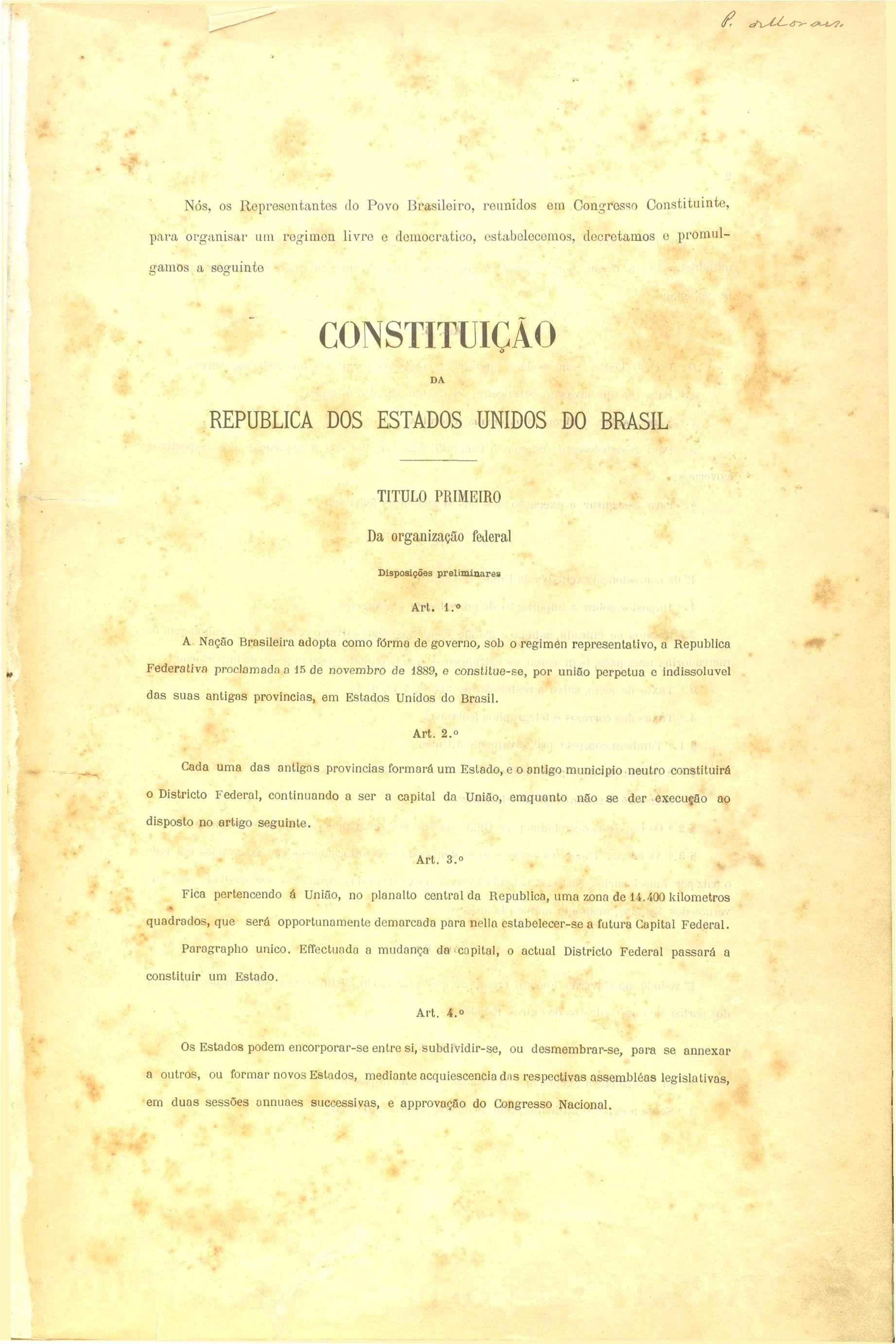
Page 01 of the 1891 Constitution of the Republic of Brazil.

The main aspects of the 1891 Constitution were:

- Abolition of monarchical institutions;
- Senators no longer held lifetime office;
- The vice-president of the Republic would hold the presidency of the Senate at the same time;
- Presidential system of government;
- The President of the Republic became the head of the Executive Branch;
- Elections were now by direct vote, but remained non-secret;
- The terms of office were four years for the president, nine years for senators and three years for federal deputies;
- The President and vice-president would not be re-elected for the immediately following term;
- Candidates for the effective vote would be chosen by men over the age of 21, with the exception of illiterates, beggars, soldiers, women and religious who were subject to the vote of obedience;
- The National Congress was responsible for the Legislative Power, composed of the Senate and the Chamber of Deputies;
- The provinces were renamed states, with greater autonomy within the Federation;
- The states of the Federation began to have their constitutions hierarchically organized in relation to the federal constitution;
- The Catholic Church was dismembered from the Brazilian state and ceased to be the country's official religion;
- An area of 14,400 square kilometers allocated for the future transfer of Brazil's capital to the central plateau was transferred to the federal government.

Freedom of association and assembly without arms were enshrined, the accused were guaranteed the fullest rights of defense, the sentences of galleys, judicial banishment and death were abolished, habeas corpus was instituted and federal judges were guaranteed magistracy (life tenure, permanent immovability and irreducibility of salaries).

== See also ==
- History of Brazil
- Constitution of Brazil
