= Encilhamento =

Economic bubble in Brazil during the late 1880s and early 1890s

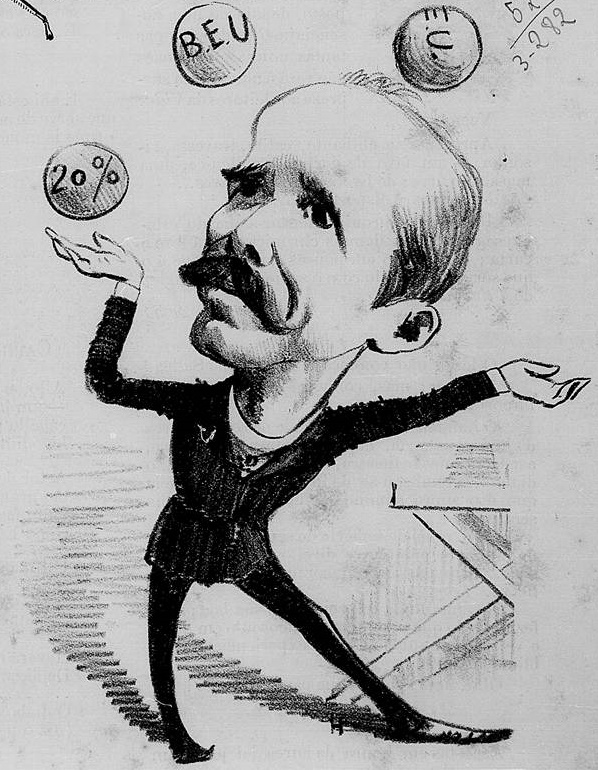
Satire depicting Ruy Barbosa, then Minister of Finance, trying to balance Brazil's finances, A Vida Fluminense, No. 29, 24 May 1890

The Encilhamento was an economic bubble that boomed in the late 1880s and early 1890s in Brazil, bursting during the early years of the First Brazilian Republic (1889–1894) and leading to an institutional and a financial crisis. Two Finance Ministers, first the Viscount of Ouro Preto and then Ruy Barbosa, adopted a policy of unrestricted credit for industrial investments, backed by an abundant issuance of money, in order to encourage Brazil's industrialization. This policy of economic incentives created unbridled speculation and increased inflation, and encouraged fraudulent initial public offerings (IPOs) and takeovers.

== The name ==
The word "encilhamento", literally "saddling-up", the act of girthing or mounting a horse, was a term borrowed from horse racing and used to refer to the speculative practice of seizing get-rich-quick opportunities whenever they unfold, in an analogy based on the popular Brazilian saying "An unmounted saddled horse doesn't appear twice."

== Background ==
Throughout the 19th century the maturation of technological innovations, especially the development of rail transport, gas lighting and steamships, among others, all linked to the process of industrialization, created opportunities for large speculative movements, leading to an acceleration of the flow of capital in the world.

In spite of the considerable volume of native capital being released with the abolition of the slave trade in 1850 – at the same time when the Baron of Mauá was laying the foundations of the modern banking system in Brazil – decades later at beginning of the Republic, the Brazilian economy was still being held back by, amongst other things, restrictive economic legislation – notably the "Land Law" of 1850 and the "Barriers Act" of 1860, which inhibited the access to land ownership by former slaves and immigrants at a time when agriculture was economically predominant in the country, and curbed for decades the development of Brazilian financial markets, with them having become at that time, a kind of "notary oligopoly" under the control of few families.

Proposed changes in land legislation were one of the reasons why large landowners and former slaveholders supported the establishment of the republic. In this political, economic and social environment, under the pretext of promoting the industrialization of the country, occurred the Encilhamento.

=== Leading figures ===
- Big rentiers: holders of the native "big money", who went after the best rate of return for their capital. In Brazil of the late 19th century, these were predominantly big landowners, former slave traders and owners, merchants, businessmen and tradesmen (especially those involved with coffee and cotton exports), senior civil servants, politicians and lawyers with influence in formulation and implementation of public policies. They stored their financial resources in the country, with the most sophisticated investing in foreign financial markets, mainly in the Parisian Bourse, City of London and Wall Street;
- Financiers: institutional traders and investment bankers working for the big money, having contact with big business and having learned new forms of financial engineering. In Brazil of that time, the most illustrious figure was the Counselor Mayrink;
- Economists/politicians: They are the makers of economic policies, usually also the middlemen of the rentiers and financiers' interests, eventually acting as their junior partners. They provided rhetoric to the public opinion and the technical means to implement a regulatory model that served big money's interests. Rui Barbosa was the prominent figure of that time in Brazil;
- Haute Finance: The global financial moguls, which from the mid-19th century were already organized to influence the life of nations in order to create the "ideal" environment" for their business. From that time, highlight the British banks led by Rothschilds.

== Execution ==
The first step that led to the Encilhamento took place during the final years of the Empire of Brazil under the command of Viscount of Ouro Preto, the last finance minister of the imperial era, when a new Banking Act was enacted in November 1888. The Rio de Janeiro Stock Exchange, which had already boomed in 1886, had accelerated with the abolition of slavery two years later and again with the measures implemented by the new banking law (that reversed the 1860 "Barriers Act"), and again by the proposed changes for the Land and Real Estate laws in 1889. Along with the increase in market liquidity, there was the introduction of modern financial mechanisms, enhancing the financial leverage possibilities. The reduction in the issuance of government bonds has also opened space for the expansion of stocks issues. All this, slowly led to an increase in speculation and inflation in general, embracing all economic sectors, from the currencies to real estate, combining minor bubbles into a big one.

In this environment, the Viscount of Ouro Preto decided to create an institution to act as a regulatory agency for the financial market, a private central bank in the European manner, a reserve bank, a monetary authority of liquidity. The fact that Ruy Barbosa had been a great opponent of such system, accredited him to be appointed by the military as finance secretary, when they imposed the republic. When he took office, soon after the proclamation of the Republic, he put into practice all what he had criticized before. In January 1890 he enacted a new banking law inspired by the ideas of counselor Mayrinck, his banker and personal friend, who he without consulting the president appointed as head of the new Central Bank, signing the bill late at night in a scandal that would be the first of a series until his departure from the secretary.

This however didn't stop the enacting of the new law, despite protests and opposition from secretaries like Demetrio Ribeiro and Campos Sales, who predicting the consequences of measures, got a central bank to São Paulo.

Unregulated speculation rose as a direct consequence of the new law and reached all major sectors of the economy, with its highest volume reached in currency trading. The majority of political fallout has however been generated by rogue IPOs - as the new banking law effectively allowed authorized issuers to act freely, without any supervision or official punishment. For example, a company without any capital could launch an IPO, but also whenever it needed more money it could simply create new shares - with existing stakeholders losing rights to their stake if they refused to purchase any.

Since the new law tied stock prices to their nominal values, there was no official oscillation of stock prices, and consequently, no way to negottate them directly in the Stock Exchange in order to both minimize losses or maximize profits. This in practice not only restricted the trading of securities to the OTC market, congesting it by supply, but also led to a deadlock for new issues in the stock market, locking out legitimate business that could have taken off out of the process, besides causing a total loss to many inexperienced investors.

Instead of help to promote growth and structural change in the economy, the process led to one of the worst inflation outbreaks in the country's history, while the Brazilian economy suffered violent "collapse". The Encilhamento's "last straw" came with the financial shock wave caused by the default of Argentine government bonds following the 1st collapse of the Bank Baring Brothers at the end of 1890, and although the burst has been initiated then, it occurred in a slow way, until 1892.

On January 20, 1891, Rui Barbosa stepped down as finance secretary to head two companies that were created during the Encilhamento and which he had partnership with Counselor Mayrink. General Deodoro da Fonseca resigned on 23 November of that year, during the 1st naval revolt, under imminent threat of deposition by the Republicans, represented by Vice President Floriano Peixoto, who "naturally" assumed the presidency.

== Aftermath ==
The success of the new stage of economic development that Encilhamento was intended to be depended on being able to create an enabling environment for both the relocation of domestic savings and introduction of foreign investments.

However, due to the extraordinary powers conferred to monetary authorities, the private interests in Encilhamento overtook the public interest. So, instead of a slow and steady promotion of development, economic growth, distribution of wealth, financial literacy & confidence; what occurred was an increase in concentration of wealth, overvaluation of profiteering at expense of productive activity, widespread bankruptcy, as well as ignorance and distrust regarding how politics and markets work, in addition to the geometric increase of debt and economic stagnation.

The three main reasons for the failure of the movement as a lever for development are as follows:

- Lack of a broader statesman to coordinate, correct and adjust the process in its progress;
- The choice of politicians and financiers who led the process, as their personal interests overlapped the country one;
- The fascination with "get-rich-quick schemes", both by the monetary authorities of that time, who worked to benefit themselves, as well as by the crowd of average amateurs who acted more like daydreaming gamblers rather than sober speculators, hurting themselves by letting themselves be manipulated, helping to inflate a financial bubble, participating in the process without having the least vocation, knowledge and experience required to not neglect legal details and use personal trading strategies with proper risk and money managements, which would have prevented countless bankruptcies and their harmful consequences.

Following the effects of the bust, came the usual period of "witch hunt" that lasted until 1895, when especially during the tenure of Floriano Peixoto, some prominent figures in the Encilhamento period had their assets frozen, seized and have been prosecuted publicly and administratively. Among these was Rui Barbosa, who had to go into exile in Europe.

The legislation concerning financial markets in Brazil, in a vain attempt to control their volatility, at a time when the concept of Antifragility was unknown, suffered a violent setback to the era of the "Barriers Act" – the restrictions only being loosened 70 years later in 1965.

Although the bubble burst happened between 1890 and 1892, its economic and political effects were made throughout the decade, with only in the end of the Campos Sales administration, with Rodrigues Alves in charge of the Brazilian economy, been decreased, but at a high social cost, due to the economic policy of austerity taken in accordance with requests of the big international capital.

== See also ==
- List of economic crises in Brazil
