= Eduardo Wandenkolk =

Brazilian Admiral and politician

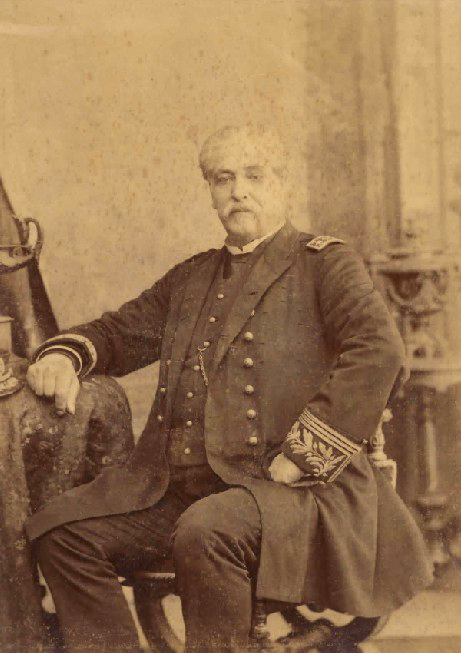

Minister of the Navy
- In office 15 November 1889 – 22 January 1891
- President: Deodoro da Fonseca
- Preceded by: Baron of Ladário
- Succeeded by: Fortunato Foster Vidal

President of the Naval Club
- In office 11 June 1900 – 11 June 1901
- Preceded by: José Marques Guimarães
- Succeeded by: Francisco Calheiros da Graça
- In office 11 June 1893 – 11 June 1894
- Preceded by: Carlos Frederico de Noronha
- Succeeded by: Joaquim Marques Batista de Leão

Personal details
- Born: 29 June 1838 Rio de Janeiro, Neutral Municipality, Brazil
- Died: 4 October 1902 (aged 64) Rio de Janeiro, Federal District, Brazil
- Resting place: São João Batista Cemetery, Rio de Janeiro, Rio de Janeiro, Brazil

Military service
- Allegiance: Brazil
- Branch/service: Brazilian Navy
- Years of service: 1853–1902
- Rank: Rear admiral
- Commands: See list: Steamship Tramandaí; Monitor Piauí; Battleship Colombo; Transport Leopoldina; Corvette Bahiana; Steamship Amazonas; Corvette Niterói; Gunboat Belmonte; Battleship Bahia; Corvette Vital de Oliveira; Battleship Riachuelo; Cruiser Almirante Barroso; Company of Apprentice Sailors of Rio Grande do Sul; 2nd Cruiser Division; Naval Division of the 3rd Naval District; Squadron in Operations; Navy General Staff
- Battles/wars: Paraguayan War; Corrientes campaign; Siege of Uruguaiana; Humaitá campaign; Passage of Humaitá; Proclamation of the Republic; Brazilian Naval Revolts

Eduardo Wandenkolk (29 June 1838 – 4 October 1902) was a Brazilian Admiral and politician who participated in the Naval Revolt against the newly proclaimed First Brazilian Republic. Wandenkolk served as Minister of the Navy during the government of president Deodoro da Fonseca.

== Biography ==
=== Early Military Career ===
Eduardo was born on June 29, 1838, as the son of José Eduardo Wandenkolk and Don Martina Gomensoro Wandenkolk. On March 1, 1853, he joined the Imperial Brazilian Navy as a midshipsman when he was only 14. He was promoted to 2nd Lieutenant on June 11, 1858, and later to 1st Lieutenant on June 11, 1858. After his promotion to captain on April 12, 1868, he participated in the Paraguayan War. For his service in the war, Eduardo Wandenkolk was decorated with the silver medals of the Eastern Campaign for his participation at the Siege of Uruguaiana and the Passage of Humaitá. On November 17, 1875, he was promoted to frigate captain and took command of the Port Authority in the province of Rio Grande do Sul.

He later joined the Club Militar which conspired against the Brazilian monarchy as well as a member of the Grande Oriente do Brasil. After the coup d'état of November 15, 1889, which overthrew the monarchy, he was Minister of the Navy from November 15, 1889, to January 22, 1891, and from March 12 to April 19, 1890. In 1890, Wandenkolk was elected to the Federal Senate. He was then made president of the Club Militar, succeeding Admiral Custódio de Melo.

=== Revolta da Armada ===
The newly founded Brazilian Navy was bitter over the loss of the monarchy and when Floriano Peixoto was elected, Wandenkolk signed the Manifesto of the Thirteen Generals which called for a new election within the republic as well as criticizing Peixoto's methods on suppressing the rebellions within the Brazilian states. However the revolt was crushed due to lack of ammunition and food and Wandenkolk was arrested for conspiring against the government and sent to Tabatinga along with other political prisoners of the revolt. His rights were then restored and was made Chief of Staff of the Armada on January 3, 1900.

He was buried in a mausoleum at the Cemitério de São João Batista, in Botafogo, Rio de Janeiro.
