= Floriano Peixoto =

President of Brazil from 1891 to 1894

His Excellency Floriano Peixoto
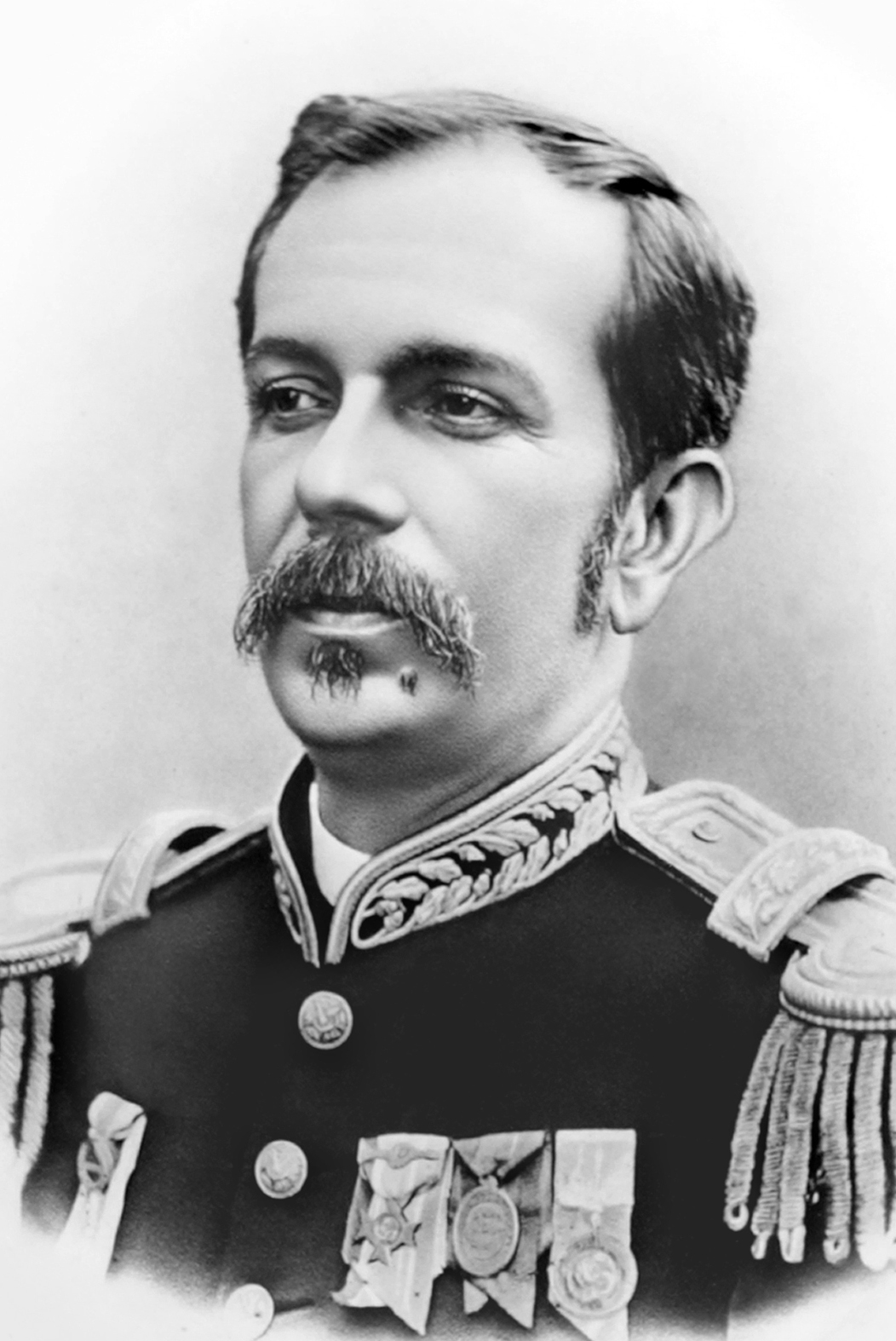
- Official portrait, 1891

2nd President of Brazil
- In office 23 November 1891 – 15 November 1894
- Vice President: None
- Preceded by: Deodoro da Fonseca
- Succeeded by: Prudente de Morais

1st Vice President of Brazil
- In office 26 February 1891 – 23 November 1891
- President: Deodoro da Fonseca
- Preceded by: Office established
- Succeeded by: Manuel Vitorino
Judicial offices
Justice of the Superior Military Court
In office 26 February 1891 – 29 June 1895
Nominated by	Deodoro da Fonseca
Preceded by	Hermes Ernesto da Fonseca
Succeeded by	Carlos Machado de Bittencourt
Legislative offices
Senator for Alagoas
In office 15 November 1890 – 26 February 1891
Preceded by	Seat established by Decree No. 510 of 1890
Succeeded by	Messias de Gusmão
Executive offices
Minister of War
In office 19 April 1890 – 22 January 1891
President	Deodoro da Fonseca
Preceded by	Eduardo Wandenkolk
Succeeded by	Falcão da Frota
President of Mato Grosso
In office 13 September 1884 – 5 October 1885
Preceded by	Baron of Batovi
Succeeded by	José Joaquim Ramos Ferreira

Personal details
- Born: Floriano Vieira Peixoto; 30 April 1839 Maceió, Alagoas, Empire of Brazil
- Died: 29 June 1895 (aged 56) Barra Mansa, Rio de Janeiro, Brazil
- Party: Independent
- Spouse: Josina Peixoto (m. 1872)
- Children: 8
- Parents: Manuel Vieira de Araújo Peixoto (father); Ana Joaquina de Albuquerque (mother)
- Education: Military School of Praia Vermelha
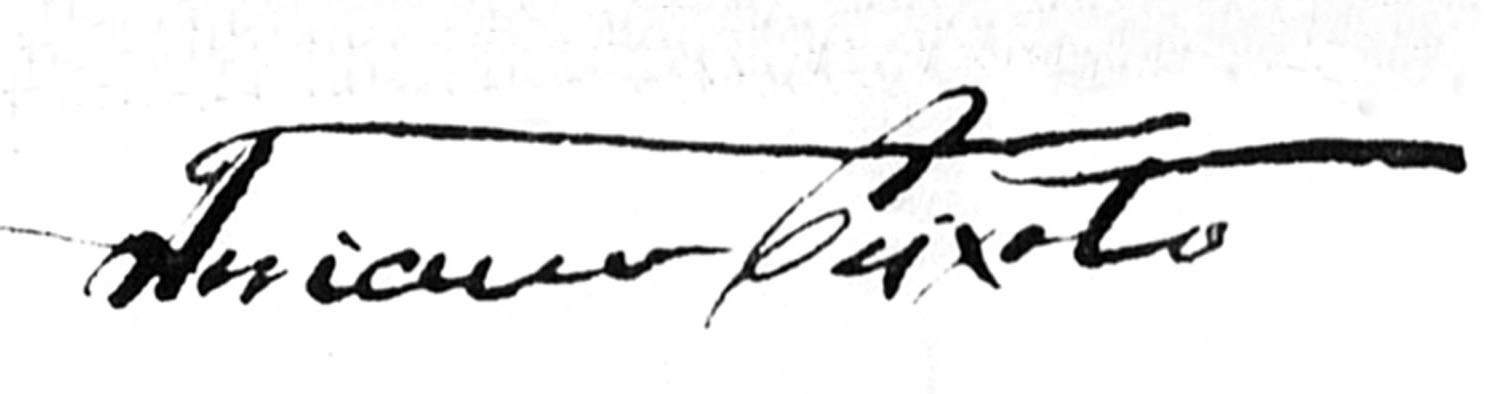
- Signature
- Nickname: "The Iron Marshal"

Military service
- Allegiance: Empire of Brazil; First Brazilian Republic
- Branch/service: Imperial Brazilian Army; Brazilian Army
- Years of service: 1857–1884; 1885–1891; 1894–1895
- Rank: Marshal
- Commands: See list: 9th Infantry Battalion; 3rd Horse Artillery Regiment; Pernambuco War Arsenal; Command of Arms of Mato Grosso; Army Adjutant General; Court Garrison; Rio de Janeiro Garrison
- Battles/wars: Paraguayan War; Battle of São Borja; Battle of Tuyutí; Battle of Ytororó; Battle of Lomas Valentinas; Battle of Angostura; Brazilian Naval Revolts; Federalist Revolution

Floriano Vieira Peixoto (Brazilian Portuguese: [floɾiˈɐ̃nu viˈe(j)ɾɐ pe(j)ˈʃotu]; 30 April 1839 – 29 June 1895), was a Brazilian military officer and politician who served as the second president of Brazil from 1891 to 1894, being the first vice president of Brazil to have succeeded the president mid-term. Previously, from February to November 1891, he served as the first vice president of Brazil. His administration encompasses the greater part of the period in Brazilian history known as the "Republic of the Sword". A veteran of the Paraguayan War and several other conflicts in Brazil, Peixoto was nicknamed "The Iron Marshal" or "Consolidator of the Republic".

Born in the province of Alagoas, he moved to Rio de Janeiro at the age of sixteen to complete his secondary education. In 1858, he entered the Military School of Rio de Janeiro, graduating as a second lieutenant in 1861. As a member—and later commander—of the 1st Battalion of Homeland Volunteers during the Paraguayan War, he took part in key episodes of the conflict, including the battles of Tuyutí, Ytororó, Lomas Valentinas, and Angostura. In 1870, he returned to the capital and earned a bachelor's degree in physical and mathematical sciences. In 1884, he assumed the position of president of the province of Mato Grosso, serving for just over a year. He was an active participant in the Proclamation of the Republic, refusing to lead the imperial resistance against the republican coup d'état. Having risen to the highest rank in the Brazilian Army, he became Minister of War in 1890. Elected vice president in February 1891, he assumed the presidency of Brazil in November of the same year, following the resignation of the incumbent president, Deodoro da Fonseca, amidst a severe political crisis.

His administration was marked by an intense climate of rebellion, authoritarianism, and republican radicalism. In 1892, aiming to challenge the legitimacy of Peixoto's government, a group of senior military officers published the Manifesto of the 13 Generals, in which they argued that, constitutionally, Peixoto should have called for new elections rather than assuming the presidency for the remainder of Deodoro's term. The Second Naval Revolt—stemming from various conflicts between the Army and the Navy—and the Federalist Revolution—a political crisis that sought to oust the governor of Rio Grande do Sul, Júlio de Castilhos—both broke out in 1893. Peixoto suppressed these conflicts with violence, consolidating his grip on power and earning him the nickname "Iron Marshal". The cult of personality surrounding him, known as Florianism, was the first significant political phenomenon in Brazil to center on a specific republican figure.

== Election ==
Floriano Peixoto was an army marshal (he was promoted to this rank in 1874) when elected vice president in February 1891, he gained notoriety throughout his life for his strong abolitionist, anti-racist, and anti-corruption stance. In November 1891, he rose to the presidency after the resignation of generalissimo Deodoro da Fonseca, the first president of Brazil. Floriano Peixoto came to the presidency in a difficult period of the new Brazilian Republic, which was in the midst of a general political and economic crisis made worse by the effects of the bursting of the Encilhamento economic bubble, but his policies successfully put an end to the successive economic crises that had plagued the country since 1889 and in a short period of time the economy stabilized and grew again. As vice president, he had also served as the President of the Senate.

== Presidency (1891–1894) ==
His government was marked by several revolutions and immense popular support. Floriano Peixoto defeated a naval officers' rebellion against him in 1893–1894 and the Federalist Revolution in the States of Rio Grande do Sul, Santa Catarina and Paraná, with the use of strength during the same year to maintain territorial integrity.

His government was marked by an increased centralization of power, personalismo, republicanism, patriotism, nationalism, and for the fervent criticism of monarchy, with the "Florianista" ("Florianismo") cult of personality being the first phenomenon of a favorable political expression towards a republican politician in Brazil.

== Death ==
Floriano Peixoto died at Barra Mansa, in the state of Rio de Janeiro, on June 29, 1895 , from chronic liver disease, most commonly identified by historians as cirrhosis of the liver. He had been seriously ill for months before his death. Symptoms described at the time are consistent with advanced hepatic failure

== Legacy ==
He is often referred to as "the Consolidator of the Republic" and "the Iron Marshal". He left the presidency on 15 November 1894.

Despite the radically different views on his presidency at the time, later generations of Brazilians would eventually regard his dictatorial rule as necessary and more preferable than a never ending cycle of civil war and unrest.

Nossa Senhora do Desterro, the capital of the state of Santa Catarina, was renamed Florianópolis after the defeat of the federalist rebels in the city by the troops of Marshal Floriano Peixoto at the end of the Federalist Revolution.

== Bibliography ==
- Correia, Jonas (August 1942). "Uma prisão de Floriano". Revista do Instituto de Geografia e História Militar do Brasil (in Portuguese). Vol. II, no. 2. Rio de Janeiro: Institito de Geografia e História Militar do Brasil. pp. 135–140.
- Netto, João Natale (2008). Floriano, o marechal implacável: a história de Floriano Peixoto, soldado por vocação, herói da Guerra do Paraguai e Presidente da República aos 52 anos (in Brazilian Portuguese). Novo Século. ISBN 978-85-7679-190-4.

Political offices
Preceded by Baron of Batovi	President of the Mato Grosso Province; 1884–1885	Succeeded by José Joaquim Ramos Ferreira
Preceded by Eduardo Wandenkolk	Minister of War; 1890–1891	Succeeded by Antônio Falcão da Frota
New office	Vice President of Brazil; 1891	Succeeded by Manuel Vitorino
Preceded by Deodoro da Fonseca	President of Brazil; 1891–1894	Succeeded by Prudente de Morais
Legal offices
Preceded by Hermes Ernesto da Fonseca	Minister of the Superior Military Court; 1891–1895	Succeeded by Francisco José Coelho Neto
Preceded by Deodoro da Fonseca	President of the Superior Military Court; 1891–1893	Succeeded by Baron of Passagem
