= Legislative Assembly of Rio Grande do Sul =

State legislature of Rio Grande do Sul, Brazil

Coordinates: 30.0328°S 51.2311°W

Legislative Assembly of Rio Grande do Sul Assembleia Legislativa do Rio Grande do Sul
- 56th Legislature

Type
- Type: Unicameral

History
- Founded: 1828

Leadership
- President: Vilmar Zanchin, MDB
- 1st Vice President: Nadine Anflor, PSDB
- 2nd Vice President: Valdeci Oliveira, PT
- 1st Secretary: Adolfo Brito, PP
- 2nd Secretary: Eliana Bayer, Republicanos
- 3rd Secretary: Paparico Bacchi, PL
- 4th Secretary: Luiz Marenco, PDT

Structure
- Seats: 55
- Political groups: Government (28) PP (7) MDB (6) PSDB (5) PDT (4) UNIÃO (3) PODE (2) PSD (1) Opposition (14) PT (11) PSOL (2) PCdoB (1) Independent (13) PL (5) Republicanos (5) NOVO (1) PSB (1) PRD (1)
- Length of term: 4 years
- Salary: R$ 31,238.19 monthly

Elections
- Voting system: Open list proportional representation
- Last election: 2 October 2022
- Next election: 4 October 2026

Meeting place
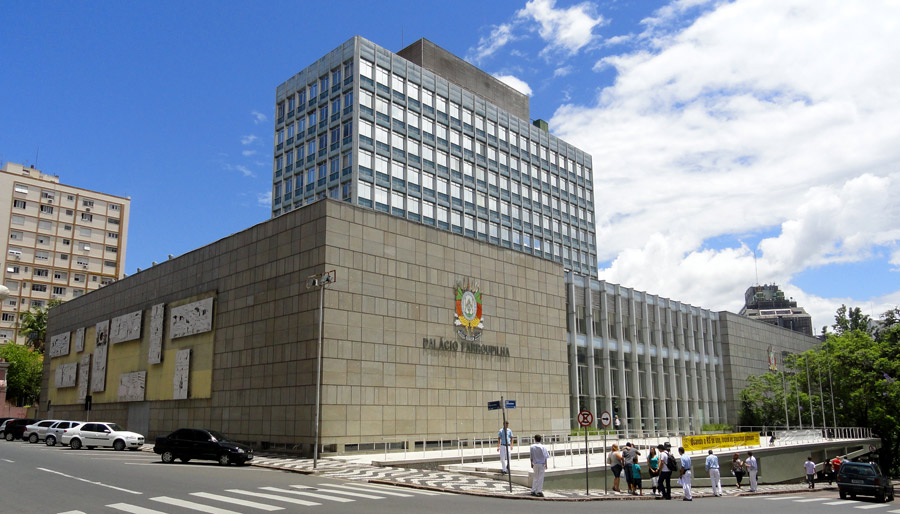
- Farroupilha Palace, Porto Alegre

Website
- ww4.al.rs.gov.br

Constitution
- Constitution of the State of Rio Grande do Sul

The Legislative Assembly of Rio Grande do Sul (Portuguese: Assembleia Legislativa do Rio Grande do Sul) is the regional parliament of Rio Grande do Sul, a federative unit in Brazil. It has 55 state deputies elected every 4 years.

== History ==
=== Imperial Brazil ===
The Assembly originated in 1828 as the General Council of the Province in the Casa da Junta, which had limited legislative power. After the creation of the Provincial Legislative Assemblies by Law No. 16 of 12 August 1834, the Legislative Assembly of São Pedro do Rio Grande do Sul began to operate on 20 April 1835. However, the Ragamuffin War, which initiated in September of the same year, prompted the Assembly to go into recess until 1 March 1845, briefly reactivating between October and November 1837. It was closed again from 1865 to 1871, during the Paraguayan War, when the imperial government suspended constitutional guarantees.

=== Republican Brazil ===
The Assembly was deactivated with the Proclamation of the Republic in 1889 until 25 June 1891. With the 1935 State Constitution, it was reduced to a Permanent Commission of 7 members, and on 10 November 1937, Getúlio Vargas decreed the Estado Novo and closed all the legislative houses. It remained in this condition until 1947, when the new deputies met for the third State Constituent Assembly.

On 20 September 1967, the legislature's new building, the Farroupilha Palace, was inaugurated.

== Present composition ==
Parties in the 56th Legislature
Party	Floor leader	Seats
Workers' Party	Luiz Fernando Mainardi	11
Progressives	Guilherme Pasin	7
Brazilian Democratic Movement	Edivilson Brum	6
Brazilian Social Democracy Party	Valdir Bonatto	5
Liberal Party	Rodrigo Lorenzoni	5
Republicans	Rodrigo Zucco	5
Democratic Labour Party	Eduardo Loureiro	4
Brazil Union	Aloísio Classmann	3
Socialism and Liberty Party	Luciana Genro	2
We Can	Airton Lima	2
Communist Party of Brazil	Bruna Rodrigues	1
New Party	Felipe Camozzato	1
Social Democratic Party	Juliano Franczak	1
Brazilian Socialist Party	Elton Weber	1
Brazilian Labour Party	Elizandro Sabino	1

== Committees ==
The Legislative Assembly has Standing and Temporary Committees, technical bodies destined to conduct studies and provide specialised reports. Below is the list of Standing Committees:

Committee	President
Committee on Agriculture, Animal Husbandry, Fishing and Cooperativism	Luciano Silveira (MDB)
Committee on Municipal Affairs	Joel Wilhelm (PP)
Committee on Citizenship and Human Rights	Laura Sito (PT)
Committee on Constitution and Justice	Frederico Antunes (PP)
Committee on Economy, Sustainable Development and Tourism	Gustavo Victorino (Republicanos)
Committee on Education, Culture, Sport, Science and Technology	Sofia Cavedon (PT)
Committee on Finance, Planning, Inspection and Control	Patrícia Alba (MDB)
Committee on Health and the Environment	Neri Júnior (PSDB)
Committee on Security, Public Services and State Modernization	Stela Farias (PT)
Joint Standing Committee on Consumer and Taxpayer Protection and Popular Legislative Participation	Thiago Duarte (UNIÃO)
Joint Standing Committee on Mercosur and International Affairs	Adriana Lara (PL)

== Historical composition ==
Legislature (election)	Parliamentary groups		
Legislature (election)	Government	Non-aligned	Opposition
Vargas Era
XXXVI (1935)	PRL (21)	Class representatives (7)	PRR (7); PL (4)
Fourth Republic
XXXVII (1947)	PSD (16); PRP (4)	PL (5); UDN (4); PCB (3)	PTB (23)
XXXVIII (1950)	PTB (21)	PSP (2); PSB (1)	PSD (17); PL (6); UDN (4); PRP (4)
XXXIX (1954)	PSD (15); PL (7); UDN (3)	PRP (4); PSP (2); PSB (1)	PTB (23)
XL (1958)	PTB (24); PRP (3)	PSP (2); PR (1)	PSD (13); PL (7); UDN (3); PDC (2)
XLI (1962)	PSD (11); PL (6); PDC (4); UDN (3); PRP (3)	PSB (1)	PTB (23); MTR (4)
Military dictatorship
XLII (1966)	ARENA (27)	—	MDB (28)
XLIII (1970)	ARENA (27)	—	MDB (23)
XLIV (1974)	ARENA (23)	—	MDB (33)
XLV (1978)	ARENA (25)	—	MDB (31)
XLVI (1982)	PDS (23)	PDT (12)	PMDB (21)
Sixth Republic
XLVII (1986)	PMDB (27)	PFL (5)	PDS (10); PDT (9); PT (4)
XLVIII (1990)	PDT (12); PSB (1)	PMDB (12); PTB (9)	PDS (13); PT (5); PFL (2); PCdoB (1)
XLIX (1994)	PMDB (10); PL (1); PSDB (1)	PPR (13); PTB (10); PDT (9); PFL (1)	PT (6); PSB (3); PCdoB (1)
L (1998)	PT (12); PSB (1)	PDT (7)	PPB (11); PTB (10); PMDB (10); PSDB (2); PFL (2)
LI (2002)	PMDB (9); PSDB (3)	PPB (10); PDT (7); PTB (6); PPS (3); PSB (2); PFL (1)	PT (13); PCdoB (1)
LII (2006)	PP (9); PSDB (5); PPS (4)	PMDB (9); PTB (5); PSB (2)	PT (10); PDT (7); PFL (3); PCdoB (1)
LIII (2010)	PT (14); PTB (5); PSB (3); PCdoB (1)	PPS (2); DEM (1); PRB (1)	PMDB (9); PDT (7); PP (7); PSDB (5)
LIV (2014)	PMDB (8); PDT (7); PP (7); PSDB (4); PSB (3); PSD (1); PPS (1); PRB (1); PV (1)	PTB (5); PR (1); REDE (1)	PT (11); PCdoB (2); PPL (1); PSOL (1)
LV (2018)	MDB (8); PP (7); PTB (5); PSDB (4); PSB (3); PR (2); PRB (2); PPS (1); Solidariedade (1)	PSL (4); DEM (2); NOVO (2); PROS (1); PSD (1)	PT (8); PDT (4); PSOL (1)
