= List of governors of Rio Grande do Sul =

Below is a list of governors of Rio Grande do Sul, a federative unit of Brazil.

This article includes all those who have governed the territory now called the State of Rio Grande do Sul, from the period of Portuguese colonization to the present day. Throughout its history, Rio Grande do Sul has been governed by captaincy commanders, captains-general, provincial presidents, state presidents and federal interventors, with the current title "governor" being used recently. The incumbent governor is Eduardo Leite.

== Republican Brazil (1889–present) ==
=== First Republic (1889-1930) ===
No.	Portrait	Name	Elected	Term of office		Political party	State vice president	Notes
No.	Portrait	Name	Elected	Took office	Left office	Political party	State vice president	Notes
1		José Antônio Correia da Câmara (1824-1893)	—	15 November 1889	11 February 1890	Military	Vacant	Appointed by Deodoro da Fonseca.
2		Júlio Frota (1836-1909)	—	11 February 1890	6 May 1890 (resigned)	PRR	Francisco da Silva Tavares (PRR) (1-6 May 1890)	Appointed by Deodoro da Fonseca.
—		Francisco da Silva Tavares (1844-1901)	—	6 May 1890	13 May 1890 (resigned)	PRR	Vacant	
3		Carlos Machado Bittencourt (1840-1897)	—	13 May 1890	24 May 1890	Military	Vacant	Acting president.
4		Cândido José da Costa (1827-1909)	—	24 May 1890	16 March 1891 (resigned)	Military	Vacant	Appointed by Deodoro da Fonseca. Transferred his office to Fernando Abbott.
5		Fernando Abbott (1857-1924)	—	16 March 1891	15 July 1891	PRR	Vacant	Acting president.
6		Júlio de Castilhos (1860-1903)	1891	15 July 1891	12 November 1891 (resigned)	PRR	Vacant	
—		Gaúcho Governative Junta	—	12 November 1891	8 June 1892	—	—	(Note: On 12 November 1891, following the attempted coup d'état by Deodoro da Fonseca and the subsequent resignation of his supporter, Júlio de Castilhos, a government junta was formed, consisting of Joaquim Francisco de Assis Brasil, João de Barros Cassal, General Domingos Barreto Leite and Manoel Luís da Rocha Osório. The political situation in Rio Grande do Sul was turbulent at the time, and the immediate aim of the junta was to maintain public order in the state. On 8 June 1892, the junta transferred its power to José Antônio Correia da Câmara in the face of threats from Júlio de Castilhos' supporters.)
—		José Antônio Correia da Câmara (1824-1893)	—	8 June 1892	17 June 1892 (resigned)	Military	Vacant	(Note: On 17 June 1982, José Antônio Correia da Câmara transferred his office to João Nunes da Silva Tavares, better known as Joca Tavares, as a result of strong opposition from Júlio de Castilhos' supporters. Concurrently, Júlio de Castilhos, following a political agreement with Floriano Peixoto - who wanted to prevent power in Rio Grande do Sul falling into the hands of his opponent Gaspar da Silveira Martins - deposed Joca through an armed movement and returned to the government of the state. However, in accordance with the agreement, he resigned his office and handed it over to the state vice president he had appointed, Vitorino Ribeiro Carneiro Monteiro, who in turn was to call a general election.)
—		Joca Tavares (1818-1906)	—	17 June 1892	17 June 1892 (deposed)	Federalist	Vacant	
—		Júlio de Castilhos (1860-1903)	—	17 June 1892	17 June 1892 (resigned)	PRR	Vitorino Ribeiro Carneiro Monteiro (PRR)	
7		Vitorino Ribeiro Carneiro Monteiro (1859-1920)	—	17 June 1892	27 September 1892 (resigned)	PRR	Vacant	Transferred his office to Fernando Abbott.
8		Fernando Abbott (1857-1924)	—	27 September 1892	25 January 1893	PRR	Vacant	Acting president.
9		Júlio de Castilhos (1860-1903)	1892	25 January 1893	25 January 1898	PRR	Vacant	
10		Borges de Medeiros (1863-1961)	1897; 1902	25 January 1898	25 January 1908	PRR	Vacant	
11		Carlos Barbosa (1851-1933)	1907	25 January 1908	25 January 1913	PRR	Vacant	
12		Borges de Medeiros (1863-1961)	1912; 1917; 1922	25 January 1913	25 January 1928	PRR	Salvador Pinheiro Machado (PRC) (1913-1919)	
—		Salvador Pinheiro Machado (1859-1919)	—	May 1915	May 1916	PRC	Vacant	Assumed the state government while Borges de Medeiros was absent for health reasons.
13		Getúlio Vargas (1882-1954)	1927	25 January 1928	9 October 1930	PRR	Vacant	

=== Vargas Era (1930-1946) ===
No.	Portrait	Name	Elected	Term of office		Political party	Vice governor	Notes
No.	Portrait	Name	Elected	Took office	Left office	Political party	Vice governor	Notes
12		Oswaldo Aranha (1894-1960)	—	9 October 1930	27 October 1930	PRR	Vacant	Federal interventor.
13		Sinval Saldanha (1886-1963)	—	27 October 1930	28 November 1931	PRR	Vacant	Acting interventor.
14		José Antônio Flores da Cunha (1880-1959)	1934	28 November 1931	17 October 1937 (resigned)	PL; PRL	Vacant	Federal interventor from 1931 to 1935.
15		Manuel de Cerqueira Daltro Filho (1882-1938)	—	17 October 1937	19 January 1938	Military	Vacant	Federal interventor.
16		Joaquim Maurício Cardoso (1888-1938)	—	19 January 1938	4 March 1938	Independent	Vacant	Acting interventor.
17		Oswaldo Cordeiro de Farias (1901-1981)	—	4 March 1938	11 September 1943	Military	Vacant	Federal interventor.
18		Ernesto Dornelles (1897-1964)	—	11 September 1943	1 November 1945	Military	Vacant	Federal interventor.
19		Samuel Figueiredo da Silva (1884-?)	—	1 November 1945	7 February 1946	Independent	Vacant	Federal interventor.

=== Fourth Republic (1946-1964) ===
No.	Portrait	Name	Elected	Term of office		Political party	Vice governor	Notes
No.	Portrait	Name	Elected	Took office	Left office	Political party	Vice governor	Notes
20		Pompílio Cylon Fernandes Rosa (1897-1987)	—	7 February 1946	26 March 1947	Independent	Vacant	Federal interventor.
21		Walter Só Jobim (1892-1974)	1947	26 March 1947	31 January 1951	PSD	Vacant	
22		Ernesto Dornelles (1897-1964)	1950	31 January 1951	25 March 1955	PTB	Vacant	
23		Ildo Meneghetti (1895-1980)	1954	25 March 1955	25 March 1959	PSD	Vacant	
24		Leonel Brizola (1922-2004)	1958	25 March 1959	25 March 1963	PTB	Vacant	
(23)		Ildo Meneghetti (1895-1980)	1962	25 March 1963	31 January 1967	PSD	Vacant	

=== Military dictatorship (1964-1985) ===
No.	Portrait	Name	Elected	Term of office		Political party	Vice governor
No.	Portrait	Name	Elected	Took office	Left office	Political party	Vice governor
25		Walter Peracchi Barcelos (1907-1986)	1966	31 January 1967	15 March 1971	ARENA	Vacant
26		Euclides Triches (1919-1994)	1970	15 March 1971	15 March 1975	ARENA	Vacant
27		Synval Guazzelli (1930-2001)	1974	15 March 1975	15 March 1979	ARENA	José Amaral de Souza (ARENA)
28		José Amaral de Souza (1929-2012)	1978	15 March 1979	15 March 1983	ARENA; PDS	Otávio Germano (ARENA/PDS)

=== Sixth Republic (1985-present) ===
No.	Portrait	Name	Elected	Term of office		Political party	Vice governor
No.	Portrait	Name	Elected	Took office	Left office	Political party	Vice governor
29		Jair Soares (born 1933)	1982	15 March 1983	15 March 1987	PDS; PFL	Cláudio Strassburger (PDS)
30		Pedro Simon (born 1930)	1986	15 March 1987	2 April 1990 (resigned)	PMDB	Synval Guazzelli (PMDB)
(27)		Synval Guazzelli (1930-2001)	—	2 April 1990	15 March 1991	PMDB	Vacant
31		Alceu Collares (1927-2024)	1990	15 March 1991	1 January 1995	PDT	João Gilberto Lucas Coelho (PSDB)
32		Antônio Britto (born 1952)	1994	1 January 1995	1 January 1999	PMDB	Vicente Bogo (PSDB)
33		Olívio Dutra (born 1941)	1998	1 January 1999	1 January 2003	PT	Miguel Rossetto (PT)
34		Germano Rigotto (born 1949)	2002	1 January 2003	1 January 2007	PMDB	Antônio Hohlfeldt (PSDB/PMDB)
35		Yeda Crusius (born 1944)	2006	1 January 2007	1 January 2011	PSDB	Paulo Afonso Girardi Feijó (DEM)
36		Tarso Genro (born 1947)	2010	1 January 2011	1 January 2015	PT	Beto Grill (PSB)
37		José Ivo Sartori (born 1948)	2014	1 January 2015	1 January 2019	MDB	José Paulo Cairoli (PSD)
38		Eduardo Leite (born 1985)	2018	1 January 2019	31 March 2022 (resigned)	PSDB	Ranolfo Vieira Júnior (PTB/PSDB)
39		Ranolfo Vieira Júnior (born 1966)	—	31 March 2022	1 January 2023	PSDB	Vacant
(38)		Eduardo Leite (born 1985)	2022	1 January 2023	Incumbent	PSDB	Gabriel Vieira de Souza (MDB)
