= Cabinet of Tancredo Neves =

Neves Cabinet
- Cabinet of Brazil
- 1961–1962
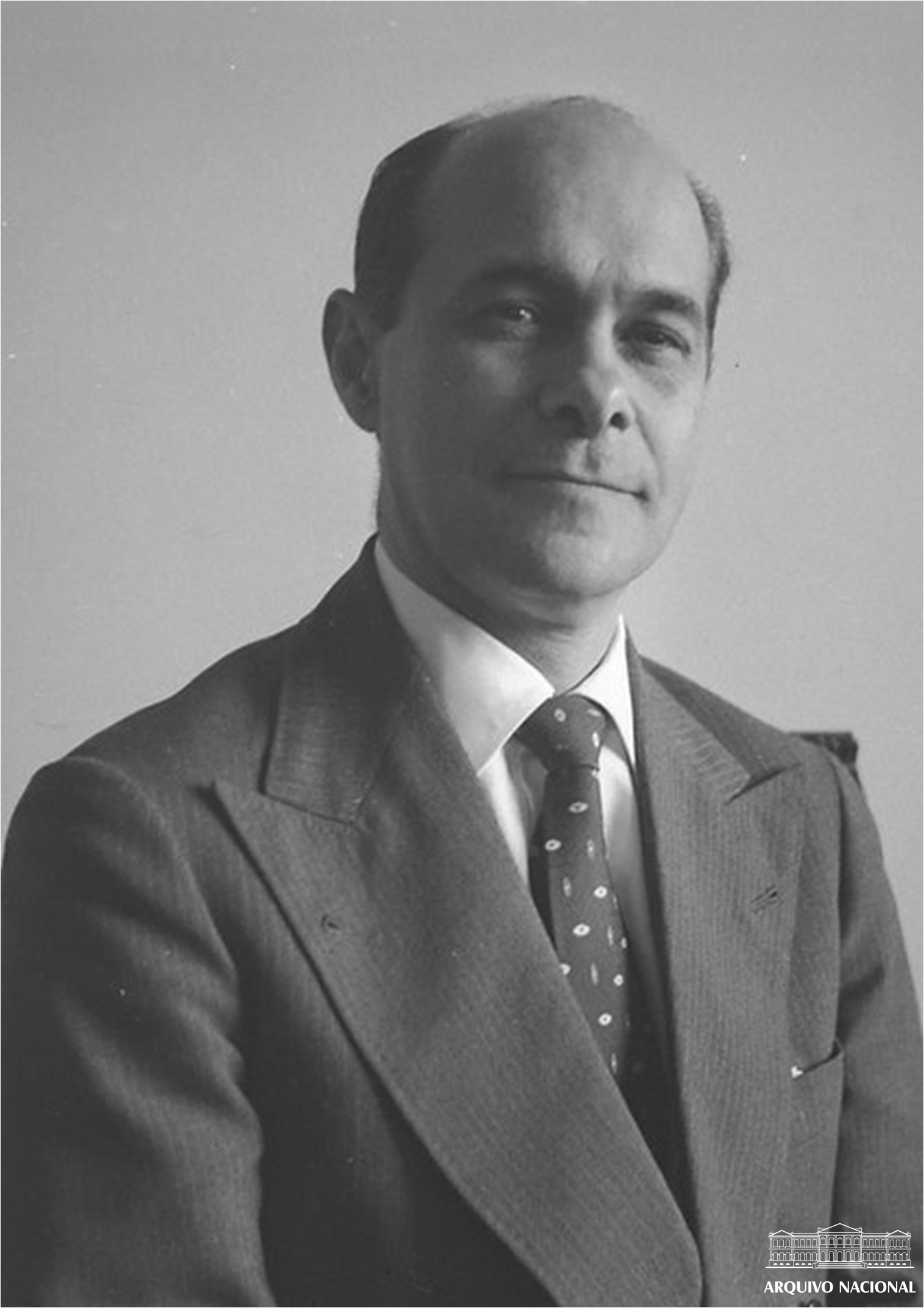
- Date formed: 8 September 1961
- Date dissolved: 12 July 1962

People and organisations
- President: João Goulart
- Prime Minister: Tancredo Neves
- No. of ministers: 16
- Member parties: Social Democratic Party; Brazilian Labour Party; Social Progressive Party; Christian Democratic Party
- Status in legislature: Coalition government 213 / 326 (65%)
- Opposition party: National Democratic Union

History
- Election: 1958 parliamentary election
- Legislature term: 1959–1963
- Predecessor: Cabinet of Jânio Quadros
- Successor: Cabinet of Brochado da Rocha

The Cabinet of Tancredo Neves was a ministry cabinet formed by the coalition of the Social Democratic Party, Brazilian Labour Party, Social Progressive Party, Christian Democratic Party and some members of the National Democratic Union, established on 8 September 1961 and dissolved on 12 July 1962. It was headed by Tancredo Neves as the first Prime Minister of the United States of Brazil, inaugurating the Brazilian parliamentary republic period.

== Council of Ministers Internal Statute ==
The Council of Ministers worked based in rules established by Presidential Decree no. 65, of 19 October 1961, which approved the Council of Ministers Internal Statute, disciplining its meetings, documents, publishings and decisions.

== Supporting parties ==
Party	Main ideology	Leader
Government parties
Social Democratic Party (PSD)	Centrism; Populism	Nereu Ramos
Brazilian Labour Party (PTB)	Labourism; Getulism	João Goulart
Social Progressive Party (PSP)	Conservatism; Populism	Adhemar de Barros
Christian Democratic Party (PDC)	Christian democracy Liberal conservatism	Franco Montoro

== Cabinet ==
Party key	PSD	PTB	UDN	PDC
Party key	PSP	No party	Military	

Portfolio	Portrait	Minister	Took office	Left office
Council of Ministers
Prime Minister		Tancredo Neves	8 September 1961	12 July 1962
Minister of Aeronautics		Brig. Clóvis Monteiro Travassos	8 September 1961	12 July 1962
Minister of Agriculture		Armando Monteiro Filho	8 September 1961	12 July 1962
Minister of the Civil Cabinet		Hermes Lima	8 September 1961	12 July 1962
Minister of Education and Culture		Antônio de Oliveira Brito	8 September 1961	12 July 1962
Minister of Finance		Walter Moreira Salles	8 September 1961	12 July 1962
Minister of Foreign Affairs		San Tiago Dantas	8 September 1961	12 July 1962
Minister of Health		Estácio Souto Maior	8 September 1961	12 July 1962
Minister of Industry, Foreign Trade and Services		Ulysses Guimarães	8 September 1961	12 July 1962
Minister of Justice		Alfredo Nasser	8 September 1961	12 July 1962
Minister of Labour and Social Security		Franco Montoro	8 September 1961	12 July 1962
Minister of the Military Cabinet		Amaury Kruel	8 September 1961	12 July 1962
Minister of Mines and Energy		Gabriel Passos	8 September 1961	19 June 1962
Minister of the Navy		Adm. Ângelo Nolaco de Almeida	8 September 1961	12 July 1962
Minister of Roads and Public Works		Virgílio Távora	8 September 1961	12 July 1962
Minister of War		Mshl. João de Segadas Viana	8 September 1961	12 July 1962
Chief of Staff of the Armed Forces		Gen. Osvaldo de Araújo Mota	8 September 1961	12 July 1962

== Government program ==
The cabinet presented the following government program:

- Establish a national union government;
- Fight inflation;
- Fight high life cost;
- Pass a tax reform;
- Rationalize exchange rate policy;
- Reduce government expenses;
- Incrase federal revenue;
- Encourage savings and investments;
- Pass a new Antitrust Law;
- Encourage the development;
- Distribute national revenue;
- Make an agrarian reform.

== Legislation approved ==
The cabinet approved, among others, the following legislation:

- Law no. 4024 of 20 December 1961, the first Law of Guidance and Bases of National Education;
- Law no. 4214 of 2 March 1962, establishing the Rural Statute, unionizing the class and extending national legislation to the countryside;
- Law no. 4070 of 15 June 1962, which granted statehood status of the Territory of Acre;
- Law no. 4090 of 13 July 1962, which established the thirteenth salary in Brazil;
- Law no. 4137 of 10 September 1962, which disciplines the repression against abuse of economic power.
