= 1962 Brazilian legislative election =

- 7 October 1962
- Chamber of Deputies
- 409 seats in the Chamber of Deputies
Party	Leader	Vote %	Seats
PSD		18.35	79
PTB	João Goulart	14.20	63
UDN	Herbert Levy	13.23	55
PR		2.22	6
PSP	Adhemar de Barros	1.02	6
PST		0.69	2
LRM		0.59	1
PRP	Plínio Salgado	0.58	1
PDC		0.45	1
PL		0.22	2
Coalitions	–		193
This lists parties that won seats. See the complete results below.
- Senate
- 45 seats in the Senate
Party	Leader	Vote %	Seats
PTB	João Goulart	13.09	12
PSD		10.80	16
UDN	Herbert Levy	10.60	8
LRM		2.62	1
PTN		2.10	2
PR		1.98	1
PSB		1.55	1
PDC		1.31	1
PL		0.93	1
PSP	Adhemar de Barros	0.76	1
Independents	–		1
This lists parties that won seats. See the complete results below.
Prime Minister before	Prime Minister after
Hermes Lima; PTB	Hermes Lima; PTB

Legislative elections were held in Brazil on 7 October 1962. Voter turnout was 80%. These were the only elections to be held under the parliamentary republican system of government introduced in 1960.

== Results ==
=== Chamber of Deputies ===
Party or alliance		Votes	%	Seats
Social Democratic Party		2,225,693	18.35	79
Brazilian Labour Party		1,722,546	14.20	63
National Democratic Union		1,604,743	13.23	55
Republican Party		269,155	2.22	6
Social Progressive Party		124,337	1.02	6
Social Labour Party		83,421	0.69	2
Popular Representation Party		70,435	0.58	1
Labour Renewal Movement		71,657	0.59	1
Christian Democratic Party		54,031	0.45	1
Liberator Party		26,379	0.22	2
Coalitions	PTB–PSB	778,457	6.42	193
Coalitions	PSD–UDN	701,892	5.79	193
Coalitions	PDC–PRT–UDN	699,211	5.76	193
Coalitions	PSD–PSP	654,835	5.40	193
Coalitions	PTN–LRM	366,951	3.02	193
Coalitions	PL–PRP–PDC–UDN	286,155	2.36	193
Coalitions	PSD–PSP–PDC–PTN–PSB	294,458	2.43	193
Coalitions	PTB–PR–PL	273,972	2.26	193
Coalitions	UDN–PDC–PTN	241,194	1.99	193
Coalitions	PTB–PR–PRP	236,333	1.95	193
Coalitions	PSD–PDC	141,116	1.16	193
Coalitions	PSD–UDN–PDC	135,070	1.11	193
Coalitions	PSD–PST	119,841	0.99	193
Coalitions	PTB–UDN–PSP–PRP	111,371	0.92	193
Coalitions	PSD–PTN	102,959	0.85	193
Coalitions	LRM–PSB–PST	96,308	0.79	193
Coalitions	UDN–PSP–PDC	83,779	0.69	193
Coalitions	PTB–PSD	83,516	0.69	193
Coalitions	UDN–PST	81,751	0.67	193
Coalitions	PSP–PTN–PRT–PR–LRM–PSB–UDN–PL	83,151	0.69	193
Coalitions	UDN–PTB–PST	66,311	0.55	193
Coalitions	PSB–PST	61,849	0.51	193
Coalitions	PSD–PR	59,259	0.49	193
Others		120,047	0.99	193
Total		12,132,183	100.00	409
Valid votes		12,132,183	82.27	
Invalid/blank votes		2,615,038	17.73	
Total votes		14,747,221	100.00	
Registered voters/turnout		18,528,847	79.59	
Source: Nohlen

=== Senate ===
Party	Votes	%	Seats
Brazilian Labour Party	2,694,308	13.09	12
Social Democratic Party	2,222,547	10.80	16
National Democratic Union	2,182,647	10.60	8
Social Labour Party	642,801	3.12	0
Labour Renewal Movement	538,789	2.62	1
National Labor Party	431,284	2.10	2
Republican Party	408,524	1.98	1
Brazilian Socialist Party	318,369	1.55	1
Christian Democratic Party	269,560	1.31	1
Liberator Party	191,685	0.93	1
Rural Labour Party	185,909	0.90	0
Social Progressive Party	157,029	0.76	1
Coalitions	10,339,539	50.23	–
Independents	10,339,539	50.23	1
Total	20,582,991	100.00	45
Valid votes	20,582,991	69.84	
Invalid/blank votes	8,887,860	30.16	
Total votes	29,470,851	100.00	
Registered voters/turnout	18,496,335	159.33	
Source: Nohlen
