= 1958 Brazilian legislative election =

- 3 October 1958
- Chamber of Deputies
- 326 seats in the Chamber of Deputies
Party	Leader	Vote %	Seats
PSD		19.94	69
PTB	João Goulart	15.89	46
UDN	Juracy Magalhães	14.27	43
PR		5.06	14
PDC		2.72	6
PSP	Adhemar de Barros	2.53	7
PRP	Plínio Salgado	1.56	2
PL		1.05	2
PST		1.00	2
Coalitions	–	34.58	135
This lists parties that won seats. See the complete results below.
- Senate
- 326 seats in the Chamber of Deputies
Party	Leader	Vote %	Seats
PSD		10.62	6
UDN	Juracy Magalhães	8.10	8
PTB	João Goulart	6.51	6
PSB		0.56	1
This lists parties that won seats. See the complete results below.

Legislative elections were held in Brazil on 3 October 1958. Voter turnout was 92%.

== Results ==
=== Chamber of Deputies ===
Party or alliance		Votes	%	Seats
Social Democratic Party (PSD)		2,296,640	19.94	69
Brazilian Labour Party (PTB)		1,830,621	15.89	46
National Democratic Union (UDN)		1,644,314	14.27	43
Republican Party (PR)		583,220	5.06	14
Christian Democratic Party (PDC)		313,635	2.72	6
Social Progressive Party (PSP)		291,761	2.53	7
Popular Representation Party (PRP)		179,589	1.56	2
Liberator Party (PL)		120,956	1.05	2
Social Labour Party (PST)		115,365	1.00	2
Coalitions	PSP–PSD–PRT	897,271	7.79	135
Coalitions	PSB–PTN	549,302	4.77	135
Coalitions	PSD–PTB–PRP	320,022	2.78	135
Coalitions	PSD–PDC–PL–PRP–PST	307,079	2.67	135
Coalitions	PSD–PRP	275,247	2.39	135
Coalitions	UDN–PSP–PRT–PR–PTN	266,173	2.31	135
Coalitions	PTB–PSB–PDC–PR	213,015	1.85	135
Coalitions	UDN–PTB–PSP–PTN–PSB	205,916	1.79	135
Coalitions	PSD–PSB–PRT–PR–PTN–PL	131,324	1.14	135
Coalitions	UDN–PTB	99,983	0.87	135
Coalitions	PSD–PR–PSP–PRP	97,215	0.84	135
Coalitions	UDN–PL	89,707	0.78	135
Coalitions	UDN–PDC–PR	90,104	0.78	135
Coalitions	UDN–PST–PTN	87,864	0.76	135
Coalitions	UDN–PR–PSP	85,569	0.74	135
Coalitions	UDN–PSP	76,331	0.66	135
Coalitions	PSD–PTB	77,454	0.67	135
Coalitions	UDN–PST	58,434	0.51	135
Coalitions	UDN–PRP	55,529	0.48	135
Others		159,418	1.38	135
Total		11,519,058	100.00	326
Valid votes		11,519,058	90.85	
Invalid/blank votes		1,159,939	9.15	
Total votes		12,678,997	100.00	
Registered voters/turnout		13,780,480	92.01	
Source: Nohlen

=== Senate ===
Party	Votes	%	Seats
Social Democratic Party	1,123,574	10.62	6
National Democratic Union	856,846	8.10	8
Brazilian Labour Party	688,880	6.51	6
National Labor Party	245,872	2.32	0
Social Progressive Party	244,863	2.31	0
Social Labour Party	236,451	2.23	0
Brazilian Socialist Party	59,201	0.56	1
Republican Party	21,237	0.20	0
Coalitions	7,104,129	67.14	–
Total	10,581,053	100.00	21
Valid votes	10,581,053	83.68	
Invalid/blank votes	2,063,614	16.32	
Total votes	12,644,667	100.00	
Registered voters/turnout	13,743,677	92.00	
Source: Nohlen
