= National Labour Party (Brazil, 1945–1965) =

Defunct Brazilian political party

National Labour Party Partido Trabalhista Nacional
- Leader: Emilio Carlos (1948–1963)
- Founded: 1945
- Dissolved: 27 October 1965
- Ideology: Conservatism; Traditionalism; Labourism; Janismo
- Political position: Centre-right

The National Labour Party (Portuguese: Partido Trabalhista Nacional, PTN) was a Brazilian political party of the Fourth Republic. It came into being in 1945, when the Estado Novo of Getúlio Vargas was liberalised after the end of World War II. Ideologically, the party represented more conservative and traditionalist sections of the labour movement, which became known as Janismo.

Although the PTN never became as influential as the three main parties of the Fourth Republic (the PTB, PSD and UDN), it did serve, from 1954 until its dissolution in 1965, as the political vehicle for one consequential figure, Jânio Quadros, governor of São Paulo (1955–59), and very briefly president of Brazil (January 31 to August 25, 1961). Quadros' premature resignation from the presidency, in a failed gamble to increase his powers, triggered the Legality Campaign (a Campanha da Legalidade), which contributed significantly to the political instability leading to the military coup of 1964.

In the wake of the 1964 coup d'état, along with every other party, the PTN was oulawed on October 27, 1965, by Institutional Act #2. In 1995, 30 years after the PTN's enforced extinction, a new party was created with the same name, claiming historical lineage, and in 2016 this party was renamed to Podemos.

== Early history ==
The PTN was formed in 1945 by people linked to the Ministry of Labour who were seeking to create a trade union movement independent of Getúlio Vargas's PTB. Among its early members was the samba artist Paulo da Portela, who was never elected to any political office before his relatively early death in 1949.

In its first months, the party supported the candidacy of Eurico Gaspar Dutra for the presidency of the Republic. In elections for the National Constituent Assembly held on December 2, 1945, the party participated in a coalition in São Paulo with the Progressive Republican Party (PRP), which was renamed the following year as the Social Progressive Party (PSP).

In 1946, Hugo Borghi, an agro-industrial entrepreneur, owner of several radio stations, and the leader of the São Paulo PTB, withdrew from the PTB due to his disagreements with the party leadership. Without canceling his PTB membership, Borghi allowed himself to be put forward as the PTN's candidate for the governorship. He was defeated in the election of January 1947 and returned to the PTB. After calling a PTB convention he was reelected president of its state directory, but the PTB national leadership refused to recognise the election, and expelled Borghi from the party. Borghi subsequently joined the PTN, bringing with him an entourage of former PTB members, including Emílio Carlos, who he promoted in 1948 to the national leadership of the party, after a power struggle between the PTB dissidents and other pre-existing factions. Borghi also cemented his own control over the São Paulo section of the party.

Ahead of the elections of October 1950, Borghi proposed the merger of the PTN with the PTB, but this proposal was unsuccessful, due to the resistance of Emílio Carlos, who defended the independence of the PTN. Nonetheless, the party supported the candidacy of Getúlio Vargas for the presidency of the Republic, thus allying itself with the PTB. The PTN put forward its own candidate, Hugo Borghi, for the governnorship of São Paulo, but he was defeated by Lucas Nogueira Garcez of the PSP.

Electoral success was negligeable for the PTN in 1950. In São Paulo, the PTN elected five federal deputies (Emílio Carlos, Dario de Barros, Joaquim Coutinho Cavalcanti, Nélson Omegna, Alberto Botino), and just one in Goiás (João d’Abreu), in coalition with the PSP. In state assemblies, the party elected four deputies in Minas Gerais, five in Goiás and nine in São Paulo. At the beginning of 1951 Borghi and some of his followers returned to the PTB, splitting with Emílio Carlos, who remained in the PTN. The PTN now evolved under the supervision of Emílio Carlos, but its electoral capacity remained limited, with São Paulo continuing to be its main electoral base and its expansion to other states, through coalitions, still constrained.

== Electoral success ==
The PTN's first significant electoral success came in 1953, with the election of Jânio Quadros as mayor of São Paulo. Although Quadros was elected as a member of the Christian Democratic Party (PDC), he was also backed by the PTN and Brazilian Socialist Party (PSB). For the 1954 election to the São Paulo governorate, Jânio switched party to the PTN and was elected to the post. At the same time Auro de Moura Andrade was elected to the Senate in coalition with the PSB. In addition, the party elected five federal deputies (Emílio Carlos, Miguel Leuzzi, Luís Francisco de Silva Carvalho, Luís Carlos Pujol and Carlos Castilho Cabral). The PTN remained rooted in São Paulo, however, and failed to expand its base any further.

Ahead of the 1955 presidential elections, the PTN's national convention confirmed its support for the candidacy of Juscelino Kubitschek, launched by the coalition of the Social Democratic Party (PSD) and the PTB. The PTN nominated its own Senator, Auro de Moura Andrade, for the vice-presidency. This appointment was made under pressure from Jânio Quadros, in an agreement between him and Juscelino, preparing the ground for the latter's support for Jânio's presidential candidacy in 1961. This agreement was not cemented, however, and instead João Goulart, popularly known as Jango, became Juscelino's running mate. Both Juscelino and Jango were elected.

Consistent with its position of support for Juscelino's candidacy, and in the wake of Vargas's suicide on August 25, 1954, the PTN supported the November 11 Movement, which deposed the acting president Carlos Luz with the objective of guaranteeing the inauguration of the elected president, which was threatened by the opposition of the National Democratic Union (UDN). A few days later, the PTN voted in favour of the impeachment of former President João Café Filho, preventing his return to power.

In the 1958 elections, the PTN maintained significant growth in São Paulo, electing, in coalition with the Christian Democratic Party (PDC), Carlos Alberto de Carvalho Pinto to the position of state governor, and eight deputies to the Federal Chamber (Emilio Carlos, Olavo de Castro Fontoura, Rui Novais, Gualberto Moreira, Harry Normanton, Hamilton Prado, Luís Francisco da Silva Carvalho and Miguel Leuzzi).

The following year, the PTN held its annual convention and launched the candidacy of Jânio Quadros to run for the presidency of the Republic in the 1960 elections in alliance with the UDN, the PDC, the Liberator Party (PL) and a dissident faction of the Brazilian Socialist Party (PSB). Emílio Carlos and Jânio fought for the nomination of Fernando Ferrari (then a member of the PDC, and formerly of the PTB) as vice-presidential candidate. However, the UDN did not accept this nomination and instead promoted its own candidate, Milton Campos. This led to division in the electorate and resulted in the reelection of PTB candidate João Goulart, this time the running mate of Henrique Teixeira Lott.

== Decline and dissolution ==
The election of Jânio Quadros represented the high-water mark of the PTN's influence. Once Jânio was elected and his mandate had started in January 1961, he steered an erratic course both in domestic and foreign policy, which alienated him from supporters on both his left and his right. The PTN had little influence on his government, seeking only the maintenance of the coalition that had secured Jânio's victory. With the aim of accumulating more power to his presidency, Jânio gambled by resigning on August 25, 1961 in the hope that Congress would offer him the powers that he was seeking. Instead, Congress accapted his resignation, and João Goulart (Jango) of the PTB became president after the Legality Campaign.

In the October 1962 elections, the PTN formed the Jânista Coalition in São Paulo, together with the Movimento Trabalhista Renovador (MTR - the Labour Renewal Movement), managing to elect nine federal deputies, mainly due to the large number of votes obtained by Emílio Carlos. It also ran in coalitions in Bahia, Ceará, Espírito Santo, Guanabara, Pará, Maranhão and Rio Grande do Norte.

In São Paulo, its electoral base, the PTN maintained its support for Jânio Quadros as its gubernatorial candidate, but Jânio's resignation from the presidency had discredited him among voters, and he lost the race to Ademar de Barros of the PSP. On January 23, 1963, Emílio Carlos died suddenly in Brasília, leaving the PTN without leadership. From then on, the party played a minor role.

Realising that Congress would be obliged to ratify the candidacy of General Humberto de Alencar Castelo Branco for the presidency of Brazil in 1964, the PTN tried in April 1964 to promote, without success, the more moderate general Amaury Kruel, who had been a member of Jango's government.

Along with all the other existing parties at the time, the PTN was dissolved as a result of the enactment of Institutional Act #2 on October 27, 1965.

== Present-day incarnation ==
In 1995 a new party was formed with the same name, PTN, claiming historical affiliation to the economic nationalism and right-wing populism of Jânio Quadros. The party has been associated from its founding until the present day with the Abreu family (José Masci de Abreu, Dorival de Abreu and Renata Abreu). This party arguably belongs to the oft-changing multiplicity of non-ideological parties (or so-called "rental" parties) known as the Centrão. The party's name was changed in 2016 to Podemos.
