= Ministry of Agriculture (Brazil) =

Federal ministry of Brazil

Ministry of Agriculture and Livestock
- Portuguese: Ministério da Agricultura e Pecuária
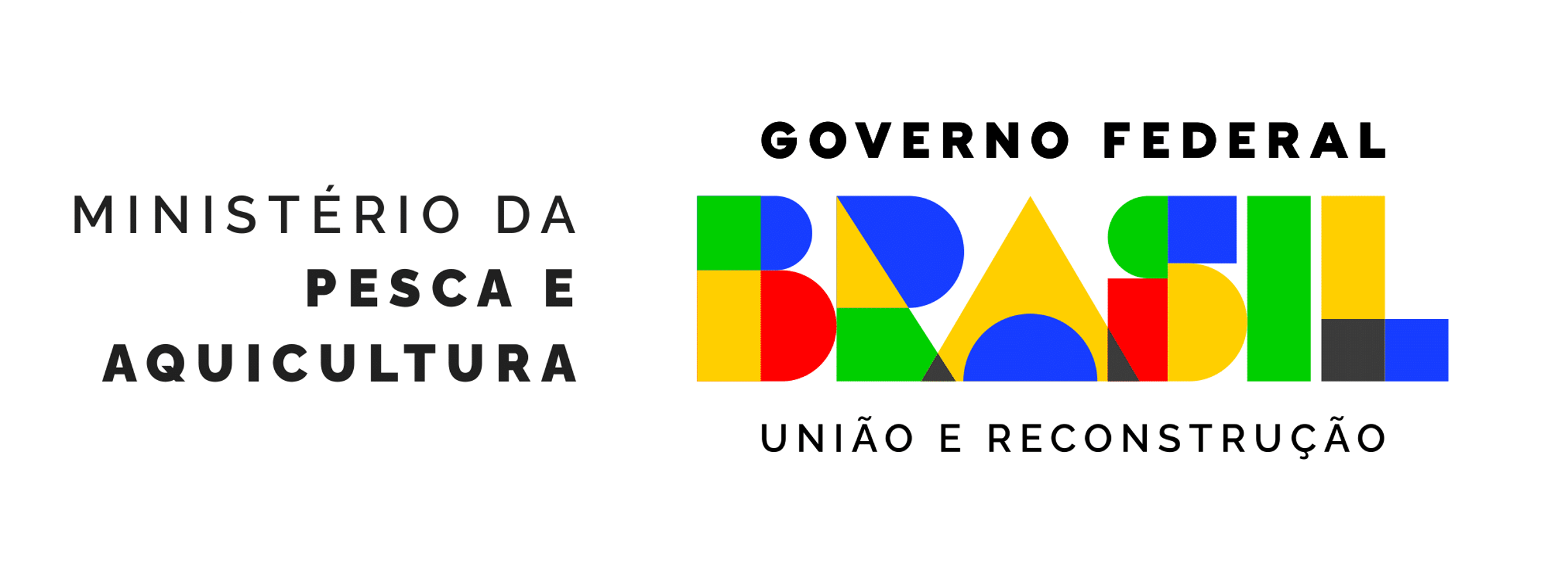

Ministry overview
- Formed: 2 March 1861; 165 years ago
- Type: Ministry
- Jurisdiction: Federal government of Brazil
- Headquarters: Esplanada dos Ministérios, Bloco D Brasília, Federal District
- Annual budget: $9.97 b BRL (2023)
- Ministry executives: Carlos Fávaro, Minister; Irajá Rezende, Executive-Secretary; Neri Geller, Secretary of Agricultural Policy; Carlos Goulart, Secretary of Agricultural Defense; Renata Miranda, Secretary of Innovation, Sustainable Development, Irrigation and Cooperativism; Roberto Perosa, Secretary of Trade and Foreign Affairs; Naur Pontes, Director of the National Institute of Meteorology
- Website: www.gov.br/agricultura/

The Ministry of Agriculture and Livestock (Portuguese: Ministério da Agricultura e Pecuária, abbreviated MAPA) is a federal department in Brazil. The jurisdiction of this ministry is to formulate and implement policies for agribusiness development, integrating the aspects of market, technological, organizational and environmental care for the consumers of the country and abroad, promoting food security, income generation and employment, reducing inequalities and increasing social inclusion.

The Ministry was founded during the Brazilian Empire in 1860. Originally named Secretaria de Estado dos Negócios da Agricultura, Comércio e Obras Públicas, the body was extinguished in the early years of the First Brazilian Republic and re-established in 1906 as the Ministerio dos Negocios da Agricultura, Industria e Commercio. In 1930, it was renamed the Ministério da Agricultura. From 2001–2022 it was the Ministério da Agricultura, Pecuária e Abastecimento, from which the acronym MAPA derives.

== Agroenergy ==
Brazil is the world leader in producing agroenergy and the Ministry of Agriculture encourages policies which develop ethanol fuel production.

== List of ministers ==
No.	Portrait	Minister	Took office	Left office	Time in office	Party	Prime Minister
1	Joaquim José Inácio, Viscount of Inhaúma	Joaquim José Inácio, Viscount of Inhaúma (1808–1869)	2 March 1861	21 April 1861	50 days	Conservative	Luís Alves de Lima e Silva, Duke of Caxias (Conservative)
2	Manuel Felizardo de Sousa e Melo	Manuel Felizardo de Sousa e Melo (1805–1866)	21 April 1861	24 May 1862	1 year, 33 days	Conservative	Luís Alves de Lima e Silva, Duke of Caxias (Conservative)
3	Antônio Coelho de Sá e Albuquerque	Antônio Coelho de Sá e Albuquerque (1821–1868)	24 May 1862	30 May 1862	6 days	Liberal	Zacarias de Góis e Vasconcelos (Progressive League)
4	João Lins Cansanção, Viscount of Sinimbu	João Lins Cansanção, Viscount of Sinimbu (1810–1906)	30 May 1862	9 February 1863	255 days	Liberal	Pedro de Araújo Lima, Marquis of Olinda (Progressive League)
5	Pedro de Alcântara Bellegarde	Pedro de Alcântara Bellegarde (1807–1864)	9 February 1863	15 January 1864	340 days	Liberal	Pedro de Araújo Lima, Marquis of Olinda (Progressive League)
6	Domiciano Leite Ribeiro, Viscount of Araxá	Domiciano Leite Ribeiro, Viscount of Araxá (1812–1881)	15 January 1864	20 July 1864	187 days	Liberal	Zacarias de Góis e Vasconcelos (Progressive League)
7	João Pedro Dias Vieira	João Pedro Dias Vieira (1820–1870)	20 July 1864	31 August 1864	42 days	Liberal	Zacarias de Góis e Vasconcelos (Progressive League)
8	Jesuíno Marcondes de Oliveira e Sá	Jesuíno Marcondes de Oliveira e Sá (1827–1903)	31 August 1864	12 May 1865	254 days	Liberal	Francisco José Furtado (Liberal)
9	Antônio Francisco de Paula Sousa	Antônio Francisco de Paula Sousa (1843–1917)	12 May 1865	3 August 1866	1 year, 83 days	Liberal	Pedro de Araújo Lima, Marquis of Olinda (Liberal)
10	Manuel Pinto de Sousa Dantas	Manuel Pinto de Sousa Dantas (1831–1894)	3 August 1866	16 July 1868	1 year, 348 days	Liberal	Zacarias de Góis e Vasconcelos (Liberal)
11	Joaquim Antão Fernandes Leão	Joaquim Antão Fernandes Leão (1809–1887)	16 July 1868	10 January 1870	1 year, 178 days	Conservative	Joaquim Rodrigues Torres, Viscount of Itaboraí (Conservative)
12	Diogo Cavalcanti de Albuquerque, Viscount of Cavalcanti	Diogo Cavalcanti de Albuquerque, Viscount of Cavalcanti (1829–1899)	10 January 1870	29 September 1870	262 days	Conservative	Joaquim Rodrigues Torres, Viscount of Itaboraí (Conservative)
13	Jerônimo Teixeira Júnior, Viscount of Cruzeiro	Jerônimo Teixeira Júnior, Viscount of Cruzeiro (1830–1892)	29 September 1870	20 November 1870	52 days	Conservative	José Antônio Pimenta Bueno, Marquis of São Vicente (Conservative)
14	João Alfredo Correia de Oliveira	João Alfredo Correia de Oliveira (1835–1919)	20 November 1870	7 March 1871	107 days	Conservative	José Antônio Pimenta Bueno, Marquis of São Vicente (Conservative)
15	Teodoro Machado Pereira da Silva	Teodoro Machado Pereira da Silva (1832–1910)	7 March 1871	20 April 1872	1 year, 44 days	Conservative	José Paranhos, Baron of Rio Branco (Conservative)
16	Cândido Borges Monteiro, Viscount of Itaúna	Cândido Borges Monteiro, Viscount of Itaúna (1812–1872)	20 April 1872	26 August 1872	128 days	Conservative	José Paranhos, Baron of Rio Branco (Conservative)
17	Francisco Barros Barreto	Francisco Barros Barreto (1828–1918)	26 August 1872	28 January 1873	155 days	Conservative	José Paranhos, Baron of Rio Branco (Conservative)
18	Costa Pereira	Costa Pereira (1833–1899)	28 January 1873	25 June 1875	2 years, 148 days	Conservative	José Paranhos, Baron of Rio Branco (Conservative)
19	Tomás Coelho de Almeida	Tomás Coelho de Almeida (1838–1895)	25 June 1875	5 January 1878	2 years, 194 days	Conservative	Luís Alves de Lima e Silva, Duke of Caxias
20	João Lins Cansanção, Viscount of Sinimbu	João Lins Cansanção, Viscount of Sinimbu (1810–1906)	5 January 1878	28 March 1880	2 years, 83 days	Liberal	João Lins Cansanção, Viscount of Sinimbu (Liberal)
21	Manuel Buarque de Macedo	Manuel Buarque de Macedo (1837–1881)	28 March 1880	29 August 1881	1 year, 154 days	Liberal	José Antônio Saraiva (Liberal)
22	Pedro Luís Pereira de Sousa	Pedro Luís Pereira de Sousa (1839–1884)	29 August 1881	3 November 1881	66 days	Liberal	José Antônio Saraiva (Liberal)
23	José Antônio Saraiva	José Antônio Saraiva (1823–1895)	3 November 1881	21 January 1882	79 days	Liberal	José Antônio Saraiva (Liberal)
24	Manuel Alves de Araújo	Manuel Alves de Araújo (1832–1908)	21 January 1882	3 July 1882	163 days	Liberal	Martinho Álvares da Silva Campos (Liberal)
25	André de Pádua Fleury	André de Pádua Fleury (1830–1895)	3 July 1882	16 December 1882	166 days	Liberal	João Lustosa da Cunha Paranaguá, Marquis of Paranaguá (Liberal)
26	Lourenço Cavalcanti de Albuquerque	Lourenço Cavalcanti de Albuquerque (1842–1918)	16 December 1882	7 January 1883	22 days	Liberal	João Lustosa da Cunha Paranaguá, Marquis of Paranaguá (Liberal)
27	Henrique Francisco d'Ávila	Henrique Francisco d'Ávila (1833–1903)	7 January 1883	24 May 1883	137 days	Liberal	João Lustosa da Cunha Paranaguá, Marquis of Paranaguá (Liberal)
28	Afonso Pena	Afonso Pena (1847–1909)	24 May 1883	6 June 1884	1 year, 13 days	Liberal	Lafayette Rodrigues Pereira (Liberal)
29	Antônio Carneiro da Rocha	Antônio Carneiro da Rocha (1842–1925)	6 June 1884	6 May 1885	334 days	Liberal	Sousa Dantas (Liberal)
30	João Ferreira de Moura	João Ferreira de Moura (1830–1912)	6 May 1885	20 August 1885	106 days	Liberal	José Antônio Saraiva (Liberal)
31	Antônio da Silva Prado	Antônio da Silva Prado (1840–1929)	20 August 1885	10 May 1887	1 year, 263 days	Conservative	João Maurício Vanderlei, Baron of Cotegipe (Conservative)
32	Rodrigo Augusto da Silva	Rodrigo Augusto da Silva (1833–1889)	10 May 1887	27 June 1888	1 year, 48 days	Conservative	João Maurício Vanderlei, Baron of Cotegipe (Conservative)
33	Antônio da Silva Prado	Antônio da Silva Prado (1840–1929)	27 June 1888	5 January 1889	192 days	Conservative	João Maurício Vanderlei, Baron of Cotegipe (Conservative)
34	Rodrigo Augusto da Silva	Rodrigo Augusto da Silva (1833–1889)	5 January 1889	7 June 1889	153 days	Conservative	João Maurício Vanderlei, Baron of Cotegipe (Conservative)
35	Lourenço Cavalcanti de Albuquerque	Lourenço Cavalcanti de Albuquerque (1842–1918)	7 June 1889	15 November 1889	161 days	Liberal	Afonso Celso, Viscount of Ouro Preto (Liberal)

No.	Portrait	Minister	Took office	Left office	Time in office	Party	President
36	Quintino Bocaiuva	Quintino Bocaiuva (1836–1912)	15 November 1889	7 December 1889	22 days	Independent	Deodoro da Fonseca (Ind)
37	Demétrio Ribeiro	Demétrio Ribeiro (1853–1931)	7 December 1889	31 January 1890	55 days	Independent	Deodoro da Fonseca (Ind)
38	Francisco Glicério	Francisco Glicério (1846–1916)	31 January 1890	22 January 1891	356 days	Independent	Deodoro da Fonseca (Ind)
39	Henrique Pereira de Lucena, Baron of Lucena	Henrique Pereira de Lucena, Baron of Lucena (1835–1913)	22 January 1891	4 July 1891	163 days	Independent	Deodoro da Fonseca (Ind)
40	João Barbalho Uchôa Cavalcanti	João Barbalho Uchôa Cavalcanti (1846–1909)	4 July 1891	23 November 1891	142 days	Independent	Deodoro da Fonseca (Ind)
41	Antão Gonçalves de Faria	Antão Gonçalves de Faria (1854–1936)	23 November 1891	23 June 1892	213 days	Independent	Floriano Peixoto (Ind)
42	Serzedelo Correia	Serzedelo Correia (1858–1932)	23 June 1892	17 December 1892	177 days	Independent	Floriano Peixoto (Ind)
43	Antônio Paulino Limpo de Abreu	Antônio Paulino Limpo de Abreu (1832–1904)	17 December 1892	22 April 1893	126 days	Independent	Floriano Peixoto (Ind)
44	Antônio Cândido Rodrigues	Antônio Cândido Rodrigues (1850–1934)	19 June 1909	26 November 1909	160 days	Republican Party of São Paulo	Nilo Peçanha (PRF)
45	Francisco Sá	Francisco Sá (1862–1936)	26 November 1909	29 November 1909	3 days	Republican Party of Minas Gerais	Nilo Peçanha (PRF)
46	Rodolfo da Rocha Miranda	Rodolfo da Rocha Miranda (1862–1943)	29 November 1909	15 November 1910	0 days	Republican Party of São Paulo	Nilo Peçanha (PRF)
47	Pedro Manuel de Toledo	Pedro Manuel de Toledo (1860–1935)	15 November 1910	18 November 1913	3 years, 3 days	Republican Party of São Paulo	Hermes da Fonseca (Christian Republican Party)
48	Edwiges de Queirós	Edwiges de Queirós (1856–1921)	18 November 1913	15 November 1914	362 days	PRF	Hermes da Fonseca (Christian Republican Party)
49	Pandiá Calógeras	Pandiá Calógeras (1870–1934)	15 November 1914	7 August 1915	265 days	PRF	Venceslau Brás (Republican Party of Minas Gerais)
50	José Rufino Cavalcanti	José Rufino Cavalcanti (1865–1922)	7 August 1915	26 November 1917	2 years, 111 days	Independent	Venceslau Brás (Republican Party of Minas Gerais)
51	João Pereira Lima	João Pereira Lima (1864–1937)	26 November 1917	12 December 1918	101 years, 16 days	PRF	Venceslau Brás (Republican Party of Minas Gerais); Delfim Moreira (Republican Party of Minas Gerais)
52	Antônio de Pádua Sales	Antônio de Pádua Sales (1860–1957)	12 December 1918	28 July 1919	228 days	Republican Party of São Paulo	Delfim Moreira (Republican Party of Minas Gerais)
53	Ildefonso Simões Lopes	Ildefonso Simões Lopes (1866–1943)	28 July 1919	24 May 1922	2 years, 300 days	PRR	Epitácio Pessoa (Republican Party of Minas Gerais)
54	José Pires do Rio	José Pires do Rio (1880–1950)	24 May 1922	15 November 1922	175 days	Republican Party of São Paulo	Epitácio Pessoa (Republican Party of Minas Gerais)
55	Miguel Calmon du Pin e Almeida	Miguel Calmon du Pin e Almeida (1879–1935)	15 November 1922	15 November 1926	4 years, 0 days	Independent	Artur Bernardes (Republican Party of Minas Gerais)
56	Germiniano Lira Castro	Germiniano Lira Castro (1863–1936)	15 November 1926	23 October 1930	3 years, 342 days	Independent	Washington Luís (Republican Party of São Paulo)
57	Paulo de Morais Barros	Paulo de Morais Barros (1866–1940)	23 October 1930	18 November 1930	26 days	Independent	Military Junta of 1930 (Military junta)
58	Joaquim Francisco de Assis Brasil	Joaquim Francisco de Assis Brasil (1857–1938)	18 November 1930	22 December 1932	2 years, 34 days	Independent	Getúlio Vargas (Ind)
59	Juarez Távora	Juarez Távora (1898–1975)	22 December 1932	24 July 1934	1 year, 214 days	Independent	Getúlio Vargas (Ind)
60	Odilon Braga	Odilon Braga (1894–1958)	24 July 1934	10 November 1937	3 years, 109 days	Independent	Getúlio Vargas (Ind)
61	Fernando de Sousa Costa	Fernando de Sousa Costa (1886–1946)	10 November 1937	3 June 1941	3 years, 205 days	Independent	Getúlio Vargas (Ind)
62	Carlos de Sousa Duarte	Carlos de Sousa Duarte	3 June 1941	18 February 1942	260 days	Independent	Getúlio Vargas (Ind)
63	Apolônio Sales	Apolônio Sales (1904–1982)	18 February 1942	29 October 1945	0 days	Independent	Getúlio Vargas (Ind)
64	Teodureto Leite de Almeida Camargo	Teodureto Leite de Almeida Camargo (1889–1958)	8 November 1945	31 January 1946	84 days	Independent	José Linhares (Ind)
65	Manoel Neto Campelo Júnior	Manoel Neto Campelo Júnior (1900–1968)	31 January 1946	15 October 1946	257 days	PSD	Eurico Gaspar Dutra (PSD)
–	Daniel Serapião de Carvalho	Daniel Serapião de Carvalho (1887–1966); Acting	15 October 1946	27 April 1950	3 years, 194 days	PSD	Eurico Gaspar Dutra (PSD)
66	Antônio de Novais Filho	Antônio de Novais Filho (1898–1978)	27 April 1950	31 January 1951	279 days	PSD	Eurico Gaspar Dutra (PSD)
67	João Cleofas	João Cleofas (1899–1987)	31 January 1951	8 June 1954	3 years, 128 days	UDN	Getúlio Vargas (PTB)
68	Oswaldo Aranha	Oswaldo Aranha (1894–1960)	8 June 1954	28 June 1954	20 days	Independent	Getúlio Vargas (PTB)
69	Apolônio Sales	Apolônio Sales (1904–1982)	28 June 1954	31 August 1954	64 days	PSD	Getúlio Vargas (PTB); Café Filho (PSP)
70	José Antônio da Costa Porto	José Antônio da Costa Porto (1909–1984)	31 August 1954	3 May 1955	245 days	Independent	Café Filho (PSP)
71	Bento Munhoz da Rocha	Bento Munhoz da Rocha (1905–1973)	3 May 1955	18 May 1955	15 days	UDN	Café Filho (PSP)
72	Eduardo Catalão	Eduardo Catalão (1912–2004)	18 May 1955	31 January 1956	258 days	PTB	Café Filho (PSP); Nereu Ramos (PSD)
73	Ernesto Dornelles	Ernesto Dornelles (1897–1964)	31 January 1956	30 September 1956	243 days	PTB	Juscelino Kubitschek (PSD)
74	Parsifal Barroso	Parsifal Barroso (1913–1986)	30 September 1956	3 October 1956	3 days	PTB	Juscelino Kubitschek (PSD)
75	Mário Meneghetti	Mário Meneghetti (1905–1969)	3 October 1956	5 April 1960	3 years, 185 days	PTB	Juscelino Kubitschek (PSD)
76	Fernando Nóbrega	Fernando Nóbrega (1904–1993)	5 April 1960	6 June 1960	62 days	Independent	Juscelino Kubitschek (PSD)
77	Antônio de Barros Carvalho	Antônio de Barros Carvalho (1899–1966)	6 June 1960	31 January 1961	239 days	UDN	Juscelino Kubitschek (PSD)
78	Romero Cabral da Costa	Romero Cabral da Costa (1911–1998)	31 January 1961	25 August 1961	206 days	Independent	Jânio Quadros (PTN)
79	Ricardo Greenhalgh Barreto Filho	Ricardo Greenhalgh Barreto Filho	29 August 1961	8 September 1961	10 days	Independent	Ranieri Mazzilli (PSD)

No.	Portrait	Minister	Took office	Left office	Time in office	Party	Prime Minister
80	Armando Monteiro Filho	Armando Monteiro Filho (1925–2018)	8 September 1961	26 June 1962	291 days	PSD	Tancredo Neves (PSD)
81	Renato Costa Lima	Renato Costa Lima (1904–1993)	12 July 1962	24 January 1963	196 days	Independent	Brochado da Rocha (PSD); Hermes Lima (PTB)

No.	Portrait	Minister	Took office	Left office	Time in office	Party	President
82	José Ermírio de Moraes	José Ermírio de Moraes (1900–1973)	24 January 1963	21 June 1963	148 days	PTB	João Goulart (PTB)
83	Osvaldo Lima Filho	Osvaldo Lima Filho (1921–1994)	21 June 1963	6 April 1964	290 days	PTB	João Goulart (PTB)
84	Arnaldo Lopes Süssekind	Arnaldo Lopes Süssekind (1917–2012)	6 April 1964	15 April 1964	9 days	Independent	Ranieri Mazzilli (PSD)
85	Oscar Thompson Filho	Oscar Thompson Filho (1910–1975)	15 April 1964	16 June 1964	62 days	Independent	Castelo Branco (Military dictatorship)
86	Hugo de Almeida Leme	Hugo de Almeida Leme (1917–1992)	16 June 1964	19 November 1965	1 year, 156 days	Independent	Castelo Branco (Military dictatorship)
87	Ney Braga	Ney Braga (1917–2000)	19 November 1965	12 August 1966	266 days	ARENA	Castelo Branco (ARENA)
88	Severo Gomes	Severo Gomes (1924–1992)	12 August 1966	15 March 1967	215 days	ARENA	Castelo Branco (ARENA)
89	Ivo Arzua Pereira	Ivo Arzua Pereira (1925–2012)	15 March 1967	30 October 1969	2 years, 229 days	ARENA	Costa e Silva (ARENA); Military Junta of 1969 (Military junta)
90	Luís Fernando Cirne Lima	Luís Fernando Cirne Lima (born 1933)	30 October 1969	9 May 1973	3 years, 191 days	ARENA	Emílio Garrastazu Médici (ARENA)
91	Moura Cavalcanti	Moura Cavalcanti (1925–1994)	9 May 1973	15 March 1974	310 days	ARENA	Emílio Garrastazu Médici (ARENA)
92	Alysson Paolinelli	Alysson Paolinelli (1936–2023)	15 March 1974	15 March 1979	5 years, 0 days	ARENA	Ernesto Geisel (ARENA)
93	Antônio Delfim Netto	Antônio Delfim Netto (1928–2024)	15 March 1979	15 August 1979	153 days	ARENA	João Figueiredo (ARENA)
94	Ângelo Amaury Stábile	Ângelo Amaury Stábile (1927–2010)	15 August 1979	2 March 1984	4 years, 200 days	Independent	João Figueiredo (PDS)
95	Nestor Jost	Nestor Jost (1917–2010)	2 March 1984	15 March 1985	1 year, 13 days	PDS	João Figueiredo (PDS)
96	Pedro Simon	Pedro Simon (born 1930)	15 March 1985	14 February 1986	336 days	MDB	José Sarney (MDB)
97	Iris Rezende	Iris Rezende (1933–2021)	14 February 1986	30 March 1990	4 years, 44 days	MDB	José Sarney (MDB); Fernando Collor (PRN)
98	Bernardo Cabral	Bernardo Cabral (born 1932)	30 March 1990	3 April 1990	4 days	PP	Fernando Collor
99	Antônio Cabrera Mano Filho	Antônio Cabrera Mano Filho (born 1960)	3 April 1990	2 October 1992	2 years, 182 days	Independent	Fernando Collor
100	Lázaro Barbosa	Lázaro Barbosa (1938–2019)	2 October 1992	25 May 1993	235 days	MDB	Itamar Franco (MDB)
–	Wilson Brandi Romão	Wilson Brandi Romão (born 1930); Acting	25 May 1993	5 June 1993	11 days	Independent	Itamar Franco (MDB)
–	Nuri Andraus Gassani	Nuri Andraus Gassani (1941–2001); Acting	5 June 1993	16 June 1993	11 days	Independent	Itamar Franco (MDB)
101	Barros Munhoz	Barros Munhoz (born 1944)	16 June 1993	1 September 1993	77 days	MDB	Itamar Franco (MDB)
102	José Eduardo de Andrade Vieira	José Eduardo de Andrade Vieira (1938–2015)	1 September 1993	13 October 1993	42 days	PTB	Itamar Franco (MDB)
–	Dejandir Dalpasquale	Dejandir Dalpasquale (1932–2011); Acting	13 October 1993	21 December 1993	69 days	MDB	Itamar Franco (MDB)
–	Alberto Duque Portugal	Alberto Duque Portugal (born 1946); Acting	21 December 1993	25 January 1994	35 days	Independent	Itamar Franco (MDB)
103	Sinval Guazzelli	Sinval Guazzelli (1930–2001)	25 January 1994	1 January 1995	341 days	MDB	Itamar Franco (MDB)
104	José Eduardo de Andrade Vieira	José Eduardo de Andrade Vieira (1938–2015)	1 January 1995	2 May 1996	1 year, 122 days	PTB	Fernando Henrique Cardoso (PSDB)
105	Arlindo Porto	Arlindo Porto (born 1945)	2 May 1996	4 April 1998	1 year, 337 days	PTB	Fernando Henrique Cardoso (PSDB)
106	Francisco Turra	Francisco Turra (born 1942)	7 April 1998	19 July 1999	1 year, 103 days	PP	Fernando Henrique Cardoso (PSDB)
107	Pratini de Moraes	Pratini de Moraes (born 1939)	19 July 1999	1 January 2003	3 years, 166 days	PP	Fernando Henrique Cardoso (PSDB)
108	Roberto Rodrigues	Roberto Rodrigues (born 1942)	1 January 2003	30 June 2006	3 years, 180 days	Independent	Luiz Inácio Lula da Silva (PT)
109	Luis Carlos Guedes Pinto	Luis Carlos Guedes Pinto (born 1942)	3 July 2006	22 March 2007	262 days	Independent	Luiz Inácio Lula da Silva (PT)
110	Reinhold Stephanes	Reinhold Stephanes (born 1939)	22 March 2007	31 March 2010	3 years, 9 days	MDB	Luiz Inácio Lula da Silva (PT)
111	Wagner Rossi	Wagner Rossi (born 1943)	31 March 2010	17 August 2011	1 year, 139 days	MDB	Luiz Inácio Lula da Silva (PT); Dilma Rousseff (PT)
112	Mendes Ribeiro Filho	Mendes Ribeiro Filho (1954–2015)	17 August 2011	16 March 2013	1 year, 211 days	MDB	Dilma Rousseff (PT)
113	Antônio Andrade	Antônio Andrade (born 1953)	16 March 2013	17 March 2014	1 year, 1 day	MDB	Dilma Rousseff (PT)
114	Neri Geller	Neri Geller (born 1968)	17 March 2014	1 January 2015	290 days	MDB	Dilma Rousseff (PT)
115	Kátia Abreu	Kátia Abreu (born 1962)	1 January 2015	12 May 2016	1 year, 132 days	MDB	Dilma Rousseff (PT)
116	Blairo Maggi	Blairo Maggi (born 1956)	12 May 2016	1 January 2019	2 years, 234 days	PP	Michel Temer (MDB)
117	Tereza Cristina	Tereza Cristina (born 1954)	1 January 2019	30 March 2022	3 years, 88 days	DEM	Jair Bolsonaro (PL)
118	Marcos Montes	Marcos Montes (born 1949)	30 March 2022	1 January 2023	277 days	PSD	Jair Bolsonaro (PL)
119	Carlos Fávaro	Carlos Fávaro (born 1969)	1 January 2023	Incumbent	3 years, 200 days	PSD	Luiz Inácio Lula da Silva (PT)

== See also ==
- Ministry of Fishing and Aquaculture
- Ministry of Agrarian Development
