= 1955 Brazilian presidential election =

- 3 October 1955
- President

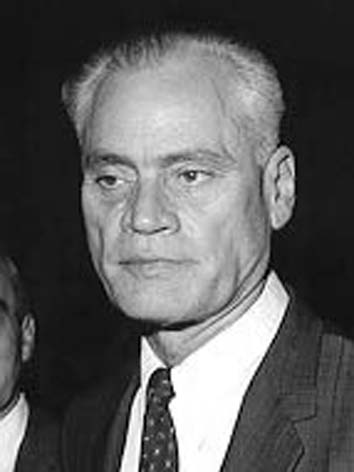

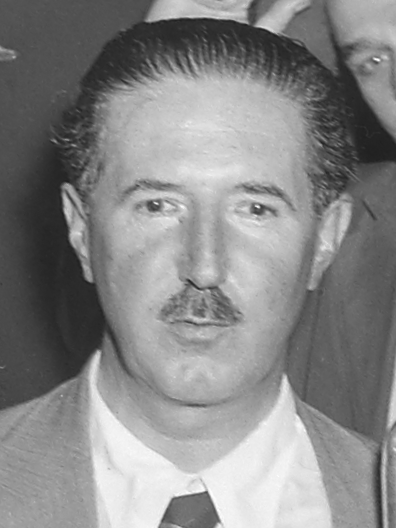

Candidate	Juscelino Kubitschek	Juarez Távora
Party	PSD	UDN
Popular vote	3,077,411	2,610,462
Percentage	35.68%	30.27%
Candidate	Adhemar de Barros	Plínio Salgado
Party	PSP	PRP
Popular vote	2,222,725	714,379
Percentage	25.77%	8.28%
- Results by state
President before election
Nereu Ramos
PSD
Elected President
Juscelino Kubitschek
PSD
- Vice president
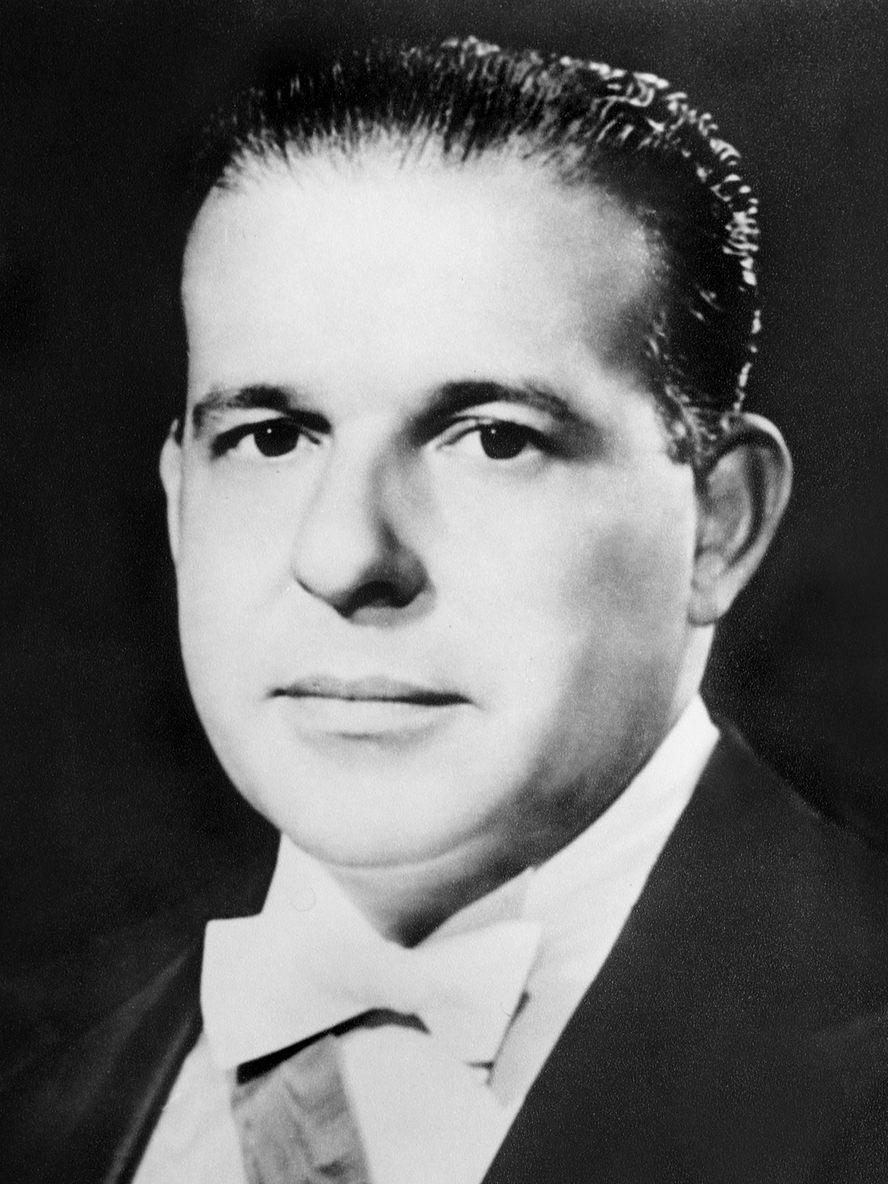

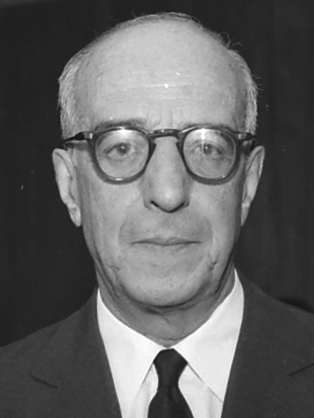

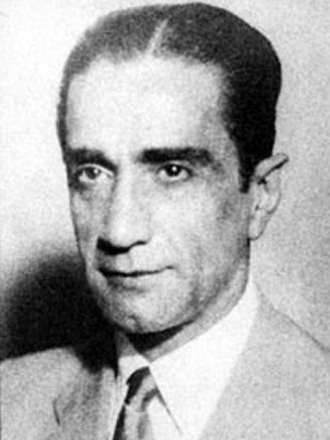
Candidate	João Goulart	Milton Campos	Danton Coelho
Party	PTB	UDN	PSP
Popular vote	3,591,409	3,384,739	1,140,261
Percentage	44.25%	41.70%	14.05%
Vice President before election
Vacant
Elected Vice President
João Goulart
PTB

Presidential elections were held in Brazil on 3 October 1955 to elect both the president and vice president. Juscelino Kubitschek of the Social Democratic Party was elected president with 36% of the vote, while João Goulart of the Brazilian Labour Party was elected vice president with 44% of the vote. Voter turnout was 60% in both elections.

== Background ==
After the suicide of Getúlio Vargas, his Vice President João Café Filho took office. Prior to Vargas' death, Brazil was living a time of intense political division, with the right-wing opposition National Democratic Union (UDN), high-level military officers and the mass media openly trying to depose him following the attempted assassination of right-wing journalist Carlos Lacerda, allegedly ordered by Vargas.

Juscelino Kubitschek, then Governor of Minas Gerais and a member of the pro-Vargas Social Democratic Party (PSD) announced his candidacy and built an alliance with the popular left-wing populist João Goulart of Vargas' Brazilian Labour Party (PTB), who was Vargas' former Minister of Labour and personal friend and who became cherished by the workers after granting a 100% increase in the minimum wage. A PSD-PTB coalition was then formed, with Kubitschek as the presidential candidate and Goulart as his running mate.

The UDN, which wanted to do a more moderate and centrist image launched the candidacy of Juarez Távora, an old military officer. The party formed a multi-party coalition in order to defeat the PSD-PTB coalition, a coalition which included the Republican Party and the Christian Democratic Party.

The Social Progressive Party (PSP) candidate was its leader, the populist former São Paulo Governor Adhemar de Barros. The PSP had supported Vargas in 1950, helping him win, but Adhemar was known to have presidential ambitions of his own.

Also on the right, Plínio Salgado of the minor Popular Representation Party (PRP) ran for president. Salgado was known for being the leader of Brazilian Integralism in the late 1930s and early 1940s. Integralismo was a far right movement described as a Brazilian branch of fascism.

During the campaign, Luís Carlos Prestes, leader of then illegal Brazilian Communist Party (PCB) recommended the tactical vote for the Kubitschek-Goulart ticket, an incident which increased the communist denunciations of the UDN and the media against the PSD-PTB campaign.

== Candidates ==
=== President ===
- Governor Juscelino Kubitschek of Minas Gerais (PSD)
- Former Agriculture Minister Juarez Távora of Ceará (UDN)
- Former Governor Adhemar de Barros of São Paulo (PSP)
- Plínio Salgado (PRP)

== Results ==
=== President ===
Candidate	Party	Votes	%
Juscelino Kubitschek	Social Democratic Party	3,077,411	35.68
Juarez Távora	National Democratic Union	2,610,462	30.27
Adhemar de Barros	Social Progressive Party	2,222,725	25.77
Plínio Salgado	Popular Representation Party	714,379	8.28
Total		8,624,977	100.00
Valid votes		8,624,977	94.81
Invalid/blank votes		472,037	5.19
Total votes		9,097,014	100.00
Registered voters/turnout		15,243,246	59.68
Source: Nohlen, SAP

=== Vice-President ===
Candidate	Party	Votes	%
João Goulart	Brazilian Labour Party–Social Democratic Party	3,591,409	44.25
Milton Campos	National Democratic Union	3,384,739	41.70
Danton Coelho	Social Progressive Party	1,140,261	14.05
Total		8,116,409	100.00
Valid votes		8,116,409	89.22
Invalid/blank votes		980,605	10.78
Total votes		9,097,014	100.00
Registered voters/turnout		15,243,246	59.68
Source: SAP
