= 1947 Brazilian legislative election =

Legislative elections were held in Brazil on 19 January 1947. The elections were for 19 vacant seats in the Chamber of Deputies, one additional Senator for each state (except Santa Catarina, which elected two), and for all state Governors and legislatures.

The elections were most notable for the continued growth of the Brazilian Communist Party, which received 9% of the vote in the state elections, becoming the third party in the state of São Paulo (ahead of the UDN) and the single largest party in the federal capital, Rio de Janeiro. The PCB's growing success and its unpopularity amongst the ruling elite led to the party being banned later in 1947 by President Eurico Gaspar Dutra.

== Results ==
=== Chamber of Deputies ===
Party	Votes	%	Seats
Social Democratic Party (PSD)	828,720	39.7%	11
National Democratic Union (UDN)	677,374	32.4%	4
Progressive Social Party (PSP)	309,531	14.8%	1
Brazilian Labour Party (PTB)	603,500	12.6%	1
Brazilian Communist Party (PCB)	4,167	0.2%	0
Party of Popular Representation (PRP)	3,915	0.2%	0
Others	1,221	0.1%	0
Total	2,088,302	100%	19

=== Senate ===
Party	Votes	%	Seats
Social Democratic Party	1,964,779	32.8	10
National Democratic Union	1,040,902	17.4	4
Brazilian Labour Party	776,866	13.0	1
Social Progressive Party	678,958	11.3	1
Brazilian Communist Party	151,182	2.5	0
Brazilian Proletarian Party	72,031	1.2	1
Progressive Renewal Party	65,395	1.1	0
Democratic Left	58,901	1.0	0
Republican Party	35,106	0.6	0
Christian Democratic Party	20,840	0.3	0
Others	984,077	16.4	0
Independents	144,751	2.4	0
Coalitions	–	–	5
Invalid/blank votes	614,184	–	–
Total	6,607,972	100	22
Registered voters/turnout	7,710,504	85.7	–
Source: Nohlen
