= 1965 Maranhão gubernatorial election =

Maranhão gubernatorial election, 1965
← 1960	October 3, 1965	1970 →
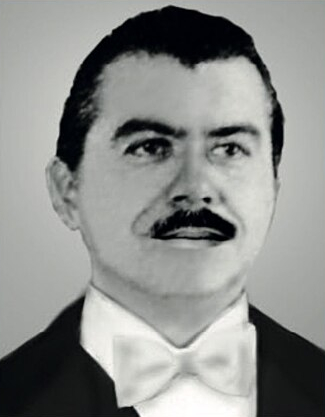
Candidate	José Sarney	Costa Rodrigues
Party	UDN	PDC
Running mate	Antônio Dino	Antenor Bogéa
Popular vote	121.062	68.560
Percentage	53,63%	30,37%
Governor before election
Newton Bello
PSD
Elected Governor
José Sarney
UDN

The Maranhão gubernatorial election of 1965 as held in Brazilian state of Maranhão on October 3, alongside Brazil's general elections. UDN candidate, José Sarney, was elected on October 3, 1965.
