= Gaúcho United Front =

Defunct political party of Brazil

The Gaúcho United Front (Portuguese: Frente Única Gaúcha, FUG; also known as the Frente Única, FU) was a coalition of two political parties in the Brazilian state of Rio Grande do Sul which formed shortly after Getúlio Vargas became governor. It was composed of the Riograndese Republican Party, led by Borges de Medeiros, and the Liberator Party, led by Joaquim Francisco de Assis Brasil.

In 1929 it became a member of the larger Liberal Alliance, which supported Vargas over Júlio Prestes in the 1930 presidential election. In 1932 José Antônio Flores da Cunha split from the FUG to form the Liberal Republican Party, which became the main enemy of the Front in Sul-Riograndense politics.

== Sources ==
- de Abreu, Luciano Aronne. O Rio Grande Estadonovista: Interventores e Interventorias. Unisinos, São Leopoldo, 2005.
- Cortés, Carlos E. Gaúcho Politics in Brazil. University of New Mexico Press, 1974.
