= Brazilian Labour Party =

Brazilian Labour Party (Partido Trabalhista Brasileiro, PTB) may refer to:

- Brazilian Labour Party (1945), dismantled after the 1964 military-led coup d'état
- Brazilian Labour Party (1981), merged with Patriota to form the Democratic Renewal Party in 2023
