= Cláudio Strassburger =

Brazilian lawyer and politician (1928–2023)

Member of the Chamber of Deputies of Brazil for Rio Grande do Sul
- In office 1 February 1979 – 1 February 1983

Personal details
- Born: Cláudio Ênio Strassburger; 24 August 1928 Porto Alegre, Rio Grande do Sul, Brazil
- Died: 1 November 2023 (aged 95) Novo Hamburgo, Rio Grande do Sul, Brazil
- Party: ARENA (1978–1979); PDS (1980–1993); PPR (1993–1995); PP (1995–2023)
- Education: Pontifical Catholic University of Rio Grande do Sul
- Occupation: Lawyer

Cláudio Ênio Strassburger (24 August 1928 – 1 November 2023) was a Brazilian lawyer and politician. A member of the Democratic Social Party, the Reform Progressive Party, and the Progressistas, he served in the Chamber of Deputies from 1979 to 1983.

Strassburger died in Novo Hamburgo on 1 November 2023, at the age of 95.
