= Laura Sito =

Brazilian politician (born 1991)

State deputy of Rio Grande do Sul
- Incumbent
- Assumed office 1 February 2023

Councilwoman of Porto Alegre
- In office 1 January 2021 – 1 January 2023

Personal details
- Born: Laura Soares Sito Silveira; 29 November 1991 (age 34) Porto Alegre, Rio Grande do Sul, Brazil
- Party: PT
- Education: Federal University of Rio Grande do Sul

Laura Soares Sito Silveira, or simply Laura Sito (born 29 November 1991) is a Brazilian politician affiliated with the Workers’ Party (PT), being both the first Black woman and the youngest state deputy of the Rio Grande do Sul Legislative Assembly.

== Biography ==
Sito is a journalist who graduated from the Federal University of Rio Grande do Sul (UFRGS). She began her political activism at age 13 with the Black rights movement through her sister Luanda Rejane Soares Sito, who participated in the movement for the implementation of racial quotas at UFRGS. While still in secondary school, she was the president of the Student Council of Colégio Estadual Júlio de Castilhos when she participated in and leaded protests with the Fora Yeda movement at her school. They sought the impeachment of the states then governor Yeda Crusius. During this time period, she became affiliated with the PT and became one of the leaders of national youth wing. She was the director of human rights at the National Union of Students (UNE), and as leader sought the implementation of the Quota Law in public universities. After leaving UNE, she became part of the National Directory of the PT.

Sito was elected as the youngest councilor of the city of Porto Alegre in 2020, having been the first Black woman to preside over a session of city council. During her two years as councilwoman, as part of the opposition, she was able to sponsor and approve legislative proposals. She was most notable for the Food Acquisition Plan of Porto Alegre (PAA Municipal) - which was instituted in 2022 - as well as the law that instituted, in municipal schools, a municipal program of Confrontation and Prevention of Domestic and Familial Violence, and Violence Against Women.

=== State Deputy ===
During the 2022 state elections, Sito was elected state deputy to the Rio Grande do Sul legislative assembly with 36,705 votes.

She was elected the first Black president of the Citizenship and Human Rights Commission for 2023 and 2024. She came to national attention in March 2023 for intervening in workplaces with conditions analogous to slavery in the wineries of the Serra Gaúcha region, and weeks later, on rice farms in the municipality of Uruguaiana.
