= Plínio Salgado =

Brazilian politician (1895–1975)

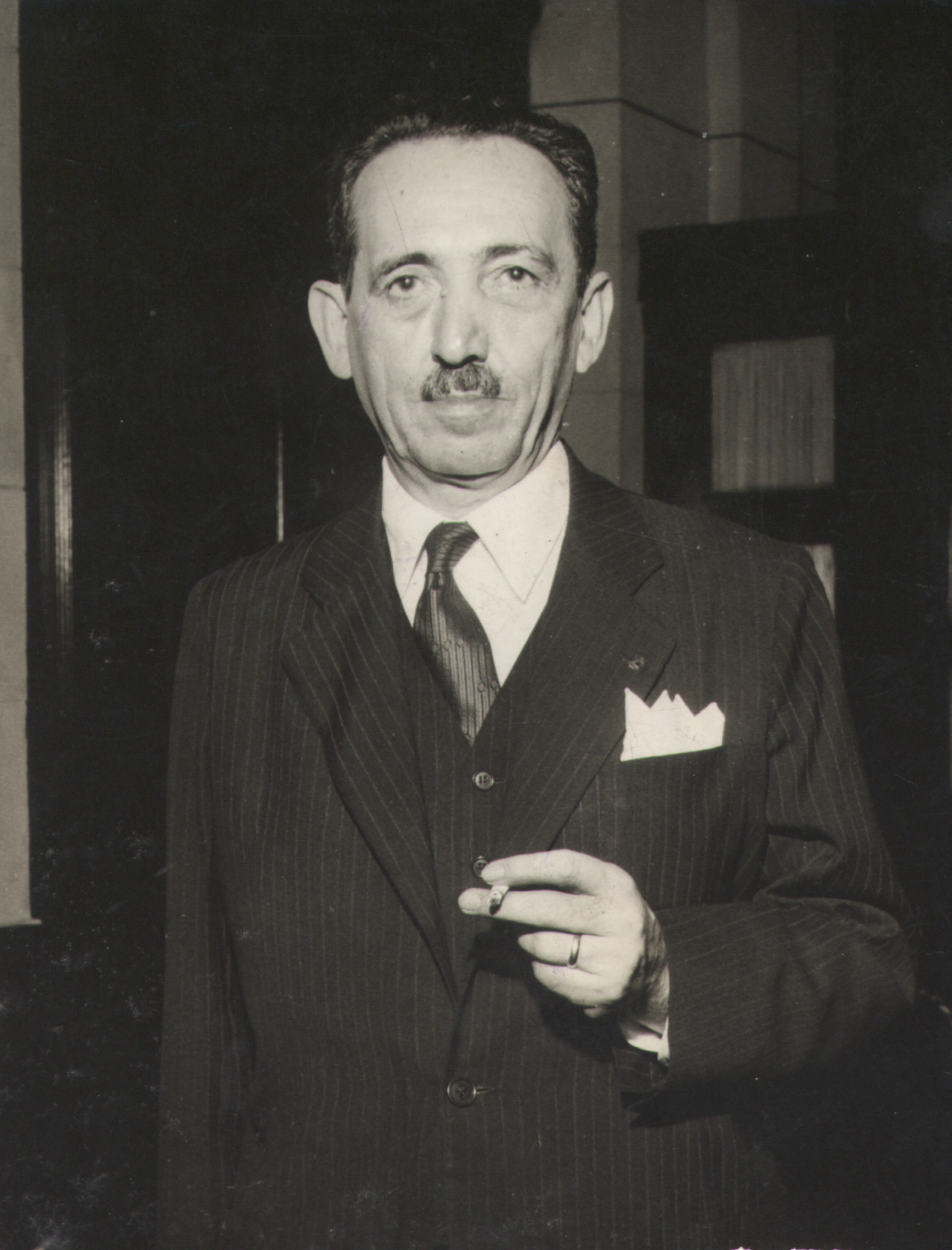
- Plínio Salgado in 1959

President of the Brazilian Integralist Action
- In office February 28, 1934 – December 2, 1937
- Preceded by: Position established
- Succeeded by: Position abolished

Member of the Chamber of Deputies
- In office March 18, 1963 – February 2, 1975
- Constituency: São Paulo
- In office February 2, 1959 – March 18, 1963
- Constituency: Paraná

State Deputy of São Paulo
- In office July 15, 1927 – October 24, 1930
- Constituency: At-large

Personal details
- Born: January 22, 1895 São Bento do Sapucaí, São Paulo, Brazil
- Died: December 8, 1975 (aged 80) São Paulo, São Paulo, Brazil
- Party: PRP (1928–1930); AIB (1934–1937); PRP (1946–1966); ARENA (1966–1974)
- Spouses: Maria Amélia Pereira (m. 1918; died 1919) Carmela Patti Salgado (m. 1934)
- Occupation: Author, journalist, politician, and theologian

Plínio Salgado (Portuguese: [ˈplĩnju sawˈɡadu]; January 22, 1895 – December 8, 1975) was a Brazilian politician, writer, journalist, and theologian. He founded and led Brazilian Integralist Action, a political party inspired by the fascist regime of Benito Mussolini.

Initially a supporter of the dictatorship led by Getúlio Vargas, he was later persecuted and exiled in Portugal for promoting an uprising against the government. After his return, he launched the Popular Representation Party, and was elected to represent Paraná in the Chamber of Deputies in 1958, being re-elected in 1962, this time to represent São Paulo. He was also a candidate in the 1955 presidential election, securing 8.28% of the votes. After the 1964 coup d'état, which led to the extinction of political parties, he joined the National Renewal Alliance, obtaining two terms in the Chamber of Deputies. He retired from politics in 1974, just a year before his death.

== Early life ==
Born in the small conservative town of São Bento do Sapucaí in the São Paulo state, Plínio Salgado was the son of Colonel Francisco das Chagas Salgado, a local political leader, and Ana Francisca Rennó Cortez, a teacher. A very active child at school, he had special interest for mathematics and geometry. After the loss of his father, at the age of 16, which is said to have made him a bitter young man, his interests shifted towards psychology and philosophy.

At the age of 20, Salgado founded and directed the weekly newspaper Correio de São Bento. In 1918, he began his political life by taking part in the foundation of a party called Partido Municipalista. This party congregated town leaders from municipalities in the Paraíba Valley region, and advocated municipal autonomy.

Also in that year, Salgado married Maria Amélia Pereira, and on July 6, 1919, his only daughter Maria Amélia Salgado was born. Fifteen days after giving birth to the couple's daughter, Salgado's wife, Maria Amélia died. Filled with sorrow, Plínio left his original study of materialist philosophers, and found comfort in the Roman Catholic theology, and began to study the works of Brazilian Catholic thinkers, such as Raimundo de Farias Brito and Jackson Figueiredo. The death of his wife had a great impact on the course of Salgado's life. He would only marry again 17 years later, to Carmela Patti.

Through his articles in Correio de São Bento, Salgado became known by fellow journalists in São Paulo, and in 1920 was invited to work there in Correio Paulistano, the official newspaper of the Republican Party of São Paulo, where he became a friend of poet Menotti del Picchia. He was a prominent participant in the Modern Art Week in 1922, leading the "Nationalists", who wanted no foreign influences and sought a "purely Brazilian" form of art, against the "Anthropophagics", who synthesized a new art from foreign influences.

He published his first novel, The Stranger in 1926. After that, alongside Cassiano Ricardo, del Picchia and Cândido Mota Filho, he launched the Green-Yellow movement, a nationalistic group inside Modernist movement. The following year, also alongside del Picchia and Ricardo, Salgado launched the Anta movement, which exalted the indigenous peoples, particularly the Tupi, as the true carriers of the Brazilian identity.

That same year, he published his book Literature and Politics, in which he defended nationalistic ideas with a strong anti-liberal and pro-latifundia stance, inspired by Alberto Torres and Oliveira Viana. His shift to far right-wing politics led Ricardo to launch the Flag movement, a social-democratic breakaway from the Green-Yellow and Anta movements.

== Integralism ==
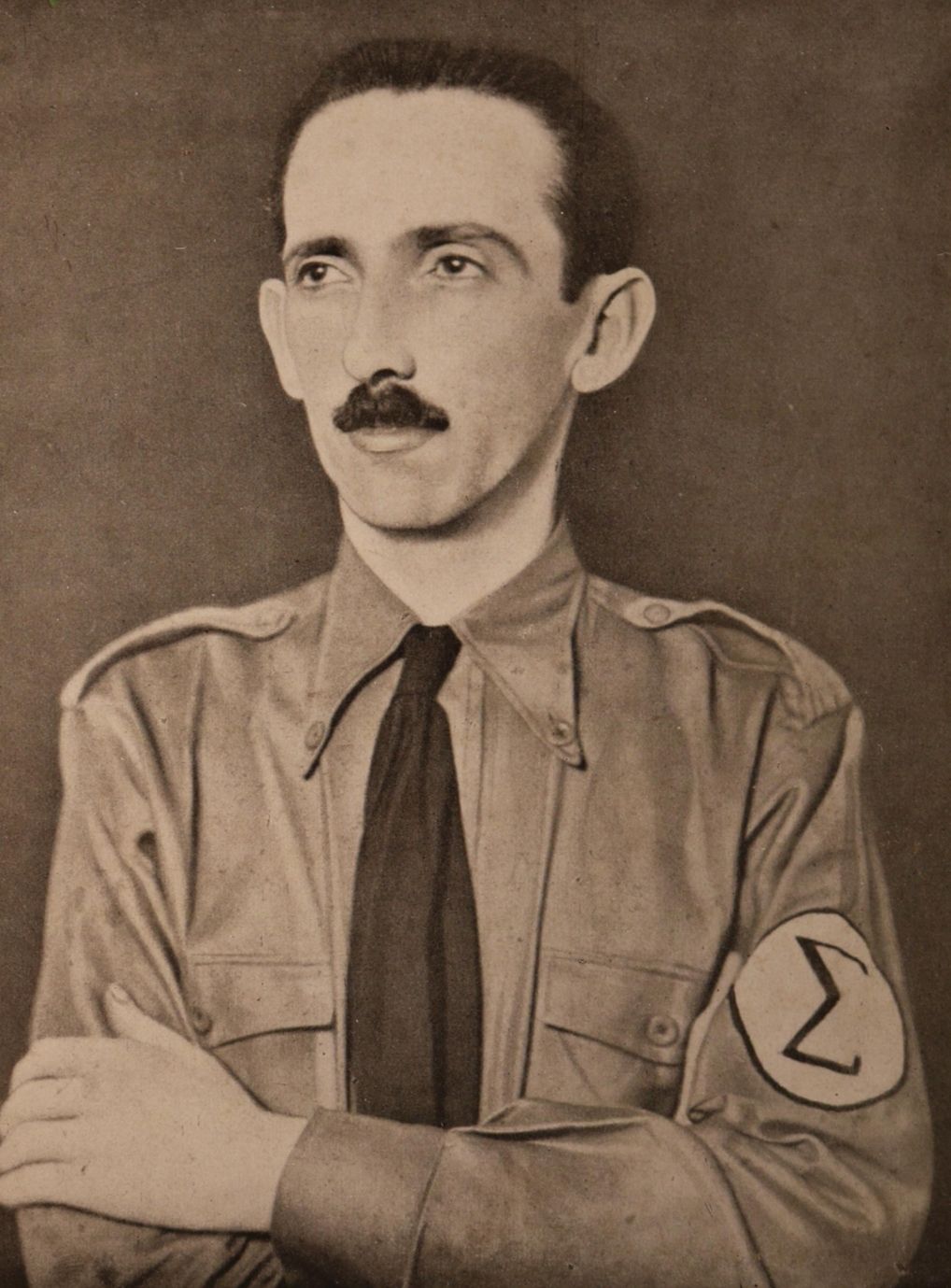
Salgado in 1935

In 1930, Salgado supported the presidential candidacy of Júlio Prestes against Getúlio Vargas. At that time, during a trip to Europe, he became impressed with Benito Mussolini's Fascist movement in Italy. After his return to Brazil, on October 4, 1930, a day after the beginning of the Revolution of 1930 which deposed President Washington Luís, Salgado wrote two articles in Correio Paulistano defending Luís's administration. Nevertheless, with the victory of the revolutionaries, he began to support the Vargas regime.

In the newspaper A Razão, founded by Alfredo Egidio de Souza Aranha, Salgado developed an intense campaign against the constitutionalization of Brazil. As such, he drew the ire of anti-dictatorship activists, who burned down the newspaper's office just before the outbreak of the Constitutionalist Revolution.

At the height of the Vargas dictatorship, Salgado created the Society for Political Studies, which gathered together intellectuals sympathetic to Fascism. Months later, he released the October Manifesto, which provided the guidelines of a new political party, the Brazilian Integralist Action.

Salgado adapted virtually all fascist symbols and forms of organization, such as a paramilitary organization with green-shirted uniformed ranks, highly regimented street demonstrations, and aggressive rhetoric, although he publicly rejected racism. The movement was directly financed, in part, by the Italian embassy. The Roman salute was accompanied by the screaming of the Tupi word Anauê, which means "you are my brother," while the Greek letter sigma (Σ) served as the movement's official symbol. Even though Salgado himself was never an anti-Semite, many of the party members adopted anti-semitic views.

Integralist Action drew its support from lower middle class Italian immigrants, a large part of the Portuguese community, lower middle class Brazilians, and military officers, especially in the Navy. As the party grew, Vargas turned to Integralism as his only mobilized base of support on the right wing, which was elated by his Fascist-style crackdown against the Brazilian left. In 1934, Salgado's movement targeted the Communist Party, then under the leadership of Luís Carlos Prestes, as an underground party, mobilizing a conservative support base to engage in street brawls and urban terrorism.

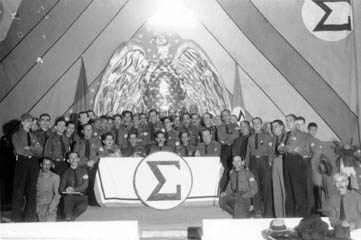
Closing session of the Integralist Congress in Blumenau, 1935. Salgado is seated at the center

On 1937, Salgado launched his presidential candidacy for the general elections scheduled to take place in January 1938. Aware of Vargas' intention to cancel the election and remain in power, he supported his Estado Novo coup, hoping to make Integralism the doctrinal basis of the new regime, as Vargas had promised him the office of the Minister of Education. The President, however, banned the Integralist party, treating it the same way he had treated other political parties after transforming Brazil into a one-party state.

In 1938, Integralist militants tried twice, in the months of March and May, to promote uprisings against Vargas. Despite denying involvement in the events, Salgado was arrested after the May uprising and was imprisoned in the 17th-century Santa Cruz Fortress in Niterói, Rio de Janeiro. About a month later, he was sent to a six-year exile in Portugal. During that period, he persistently sought to rehabilitate himself with the Brazilian regime, praising it in several manifestos, including its decision to declare war against Germany and Italy.

== Later career ==
Salgado returned to Brazil in 1945, with the end of the Estado Novo regime, and then founded the Party of Popular Representation, reformulating the integralist doctrine. Still driven by the ambition of becoming president, Salgado ran for presidency under the banner of his new party in 1955 but finished last, obtaining just 8% of the votes (around 714,000 votes). Then he supported the inauguration of President-elect Juscelino Kubitschek, challenged by the National Democratic Union, and was named to head the National Institute for Immigration and Colonization.

Salgado was elected to represent Paraná in the Chamber of Deputies in 1958. He would be re-elected in 1962, this time to represent the São Paulo state.

In 1964, he was one of the speakers at the March of Family with God for Freedom rally in São Paulo against President João Goulart. Salgado supported the 1964 coup d'état which overthrew Goulart and, with the introduction of the two-party system, he joined the National Renewal Alliance Party, obtaining two terms as a São Paulo deputy.

Salgado died in São Paulo on 9 December 1975, aged 80. He is buried at Morumbi Cemetery.

== Bibliography ==
- João Fábio Bertonha (2023). Plínio Salgado: A Brazilian Fascist (1895–1975) Routledge Studies in Fascism and the Far Right. Taylor & Francis. ISBN 978-1000983395 – via Google Books.
