= 1966 Brazilian legislative election =

- 15 November 1966
- 409 seats in the Chamber of Deputies; 23 seats in the Senate
Party	Leader	Vote %	Seats
Chamber of Deputies
ARENA	Artur da Costa e Silva	63.98	277
MDB		36.02	132
Senate
ARENA	Artur da Costa e Silva	56.63	19
MDB		43.37	4
This lists parties that won seats. See the complete results below.

Legislative elections were held in Brazil on 15 November 1966. They were the first elections held after a military coup in 1964. In 1965 the military government of President Humberto de Alencar Castelo Branco dissolved all existing parties, and enacted a new electoral law that effectively limited the number of parties to two — the pro-government National Renewal Alliance (ARENA) and the opposition Brazilian Democratic Movement.

ARENA won a landslide victory, taking 277 of the 409 seats in the Chamber of Deputies and 19 of the 23 seats in the Senate. Voter turnout was 77%.

== Results ==
=== Chamber of Deputies ===
Party	Votes	%	Seats
National Renewal Alliance	8,731,638	63.98	277
Brazilian Democratic Movement	4,915,470	36.02	132
Total	13,647,108	100.00	409
Valid votes	13,647,108	78.95	
Invalid/blank votes	3,638,448	21.05	
Total votes	17,285,556	100.00	
Registered voters/turnout	22,387,251	77.21	
Source: Nohlen

=== Senate ===
Party	Votes	%	Seats
National Renewal Alliance	7,719,382	56.63	19
Brazilian Democratic Movement	5,911,361	43.37	4
Total	13,630,743	100.00	23
Valid votes	13,630,743	78.97	
Invalid/blank votes	3,628,855	21.03	
Total votes	17,259,598	100.00	
Registered voters/turnout	22,335,242	77.28	
Source: Nohlen
