= 1970 Brazilian legislative election =

- 15 November 1970
- Chamber of Deputies
- 310 seats in the Chamber of Deputies
Party	Leader	Vote %	Seats	+/–
ARENA	Emílio Garrastazu Médici	69.46	223	−54
MDB		30.54	87	−45
This lists parties that won seats. See the complete results below.
- Senate
- 46 seats in the Senate
Party	Leader	Vote %	Seats
ARENA	Emílio Garrastazu Médici	60.43	40
MDB		39.57	6
This lists parties that won seats. See the complete results below.

Legislative elections were held in Brazil on 15 November 1970. The result was a victory for the National Renewal Alliance Party, which won 223 of the 310 seats in the Chamber of Deputies and 40 of the 46 seats in the Senate. Voter turnout was 77% in the Chamber of Deputies election and 78% in the Senate election.

== Results ==
=== Chamber of Deputies ===
Party	Votes	%	Seats	+/–
National Renewal Alliance	10,867,814	69.46	223	–54
Brazilian Democratic Movement	4,777,927	30.54	87	–45
Total	15,645,741	100.00	310	–99
Valid votes	15,645,741	69.74		
Invalid/blank votes	6,789,780	30.26		
Total votes	22,435,521	100.00		
Registered voters/turnout	28,966,114	77.45		
Source: Nohlen

=== Senate ===
Each state had two senators, with voters given two votes. In the state of Guanabara, there were two "normal" seats elected for an eight-year term, and an extra seat to complete the term of office of Senator Mario Martins, whose term was revoked by the Military Regime.

Party	Votes	%	Seats
National Renewal Alliance	20,524,470	60.43	40
Brazilian Democratic Movement	13,440,875	39.57	6
Total	33,965,345	100.00	46
Total votes	22,435,521	–	
Registered voters/turnout	28,921,169	77.57	
Source: Nohlen
