= 1978 Brazilian legislative election =

- 15 November 1978
- Chamber of Deputies
- 422 seats in the Chamber of Deputies
Party	Leader	Vote %	Seats	+/–
Chamber of Deputies
ARENA	Ernesto Geisel	50.42	231	+28
MDB		49.58	191	+30
This lists parties that won seats. See the complete results below.
- Senate
- 23 seats in the Senate
Party	Leader	Vote %	Seats
MDB		57.07	8
ARENA	Ernesto Geisel	42.93	15
This lists parties that won seats. See the complete results below.

Legislative elections were held in Brazil on 15 November 1978. The pro-government National Renewal Alliance Party (ARENA) won 231 of the 420 seats in the Chamber of Deputies and 15 of the 23 seats in the Senate. Voter turnout was 82%.

They were the last elections held under a mandatory two-party system, as reforms were enacted in 1979 by Brazil's governing military junta, represented in Congress by ARENA, to allow a multi-party system to emerge in an effort to combat the growing popularity of the opposition Brazilian Democratic Movement (MDB) by splitting their vote.

== Electoral system ==
In 1977 the electoral system had been reformed, making the election of senators indirect. As with the 1979 reforms, this was primarily done in response to the growth of the Brazilian Democratic Movement. The Senate election saw the MDB win only eight of the 23 seats, despite receiving 57% of the vote.

== Results ==
=== Chamber of Deputies ===
Party	Votes	%	Seats	+/–
National Renewal Alliance	15,053,387	50.42	231	+28
Brazilian Democratic Movement	14,803,526	49.58	191	+30
Total	29,856,913	100.00	422	+58
Valid votes	29,856,913	79.35		
Invalid/blank votes	7,770,910	20.65		
Total votes	37,627,823	100.00		
Registered voters/turnout	46,985,466	80.08		
Source: Nohlen

=== Senate ===
Party	Votes	%	Seats
Brazilian Democratic Movement	17,432,948	57.07	8
National Renewal Alliance	13,116,194	42.93	15
Total	30,549,142	100.00	23
Valid votes	30,549,142	81.46	
Invalid/blank votes	6,952,139	18.54	
Total votes	37,501,281	100.00	
Registered voters/turnout	45,864,901	81.76	
Source: Nohlen
