= 1974 Brazilian legislative election =

- 15 November 1974
- Chamber of Deputies
- 364 seats in the Chamber of Deputies
Party	Leader	Vote %	Seats	+/–
ARENA	Ernesto Geisel	52.00	203	−20
MDB		48.00	161	+74
This lists parties that won seats. See the complete results below.
- Senate
- 22 seats in the Senate
Party	Leader	Vote %	Seats
MDB		59.00	16
ARENA	Ernesto Geisel	41.00	6
This lists parties that won seats. See the complete results below.

Legislative elections were held in Brazil on 15 November 1974. The National Renewal Alliance won 203 of the 364 seats in the Chamber of Deputies, whilst the Brazilian Democratic Movement won 16 of the 22 seats in the Senate. Voter turnout was 81%.

== Results ==
=== Chamber of Deputies ===
Party	Votes	%	Seats	+/–
National Renewal Alliance	11,866,599	52.00	203	–20
Brazilian Democratic Movement	10,954,359	48.00	161	+74
Total	22,820,958	100.00	364	+54
Valid votes	22,820,958	78.74		
Invalid/blank votes	6,160,057	21.26		
Total votes	28,981,015	100.00		
Registered voters/turnout	35,810,715	80.93		
Source: Nohlen

=== Senate ===
Party	Votes	%	Seats
Brazilian Democratic Movement	14,486,252	59.00	16
National Renewal Alliance	10,067,796	41.00	6
Total	24,554,048	100.00	22
Valid votes	24,554,048	84.89	
Invalid/blank votes	4,371,744	15.11	
Total votes	28,925,792	100.00	
Registered voters/turnout	35,736,074	80.94	
Source: Nohlen
