= Joaquim Francisco de Assis Brasil =

Early 20th century Brazilian politician

Assis Brasil
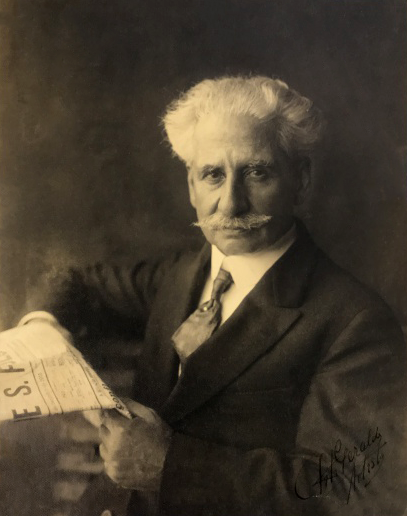

Governor of Rio Grande do Sul
- In office 12 November 1891 – 8 June 1892
- Preceded by: Júlio de Castilhos
- Succeeded by: José Antônio Correia da Câmara

Minister of Agriculture
- In office 3 March 1911 – 30 March 1911
- President: Hermes da Fonseca
- Preceded by: Pedro Manuel de Toledo
- Succeeded by: José Barbosa Gonçalves

Personal details
- Born: 29 July 1857 São Gabriel, Province of São Pedro do Rio Grande do Sul, Empire of Brazil
- Died: 24 December 1938 (aged 81) Pinheiro Machado, Rio Grande do Sul, Brazil
- Party: PRR; PL
- Education: Faculty of Law of Largo de São Francisco
- Website: http://assisbrasil.org/bio.html

Joaquim Francisco de Assis Brasil (29 July 1857 – 24 December 1938) was a Brazilian lawyer, politician, diplomat, writer and poet. He founded the Liberator Party and was a supporter of republicanism. He served as Governor of Rio Grande do Sul in 1891–92 and Ministry of Agriculture in 1911.

Together with the Baron of Rio Branco, he signed the Treaty of Petrópolis, which passed the territory of Acre to Brazilian control after the Acre War. The Acrean municipality of Assis Brasil was named after him.

Assis Brasil also introduced livestock to Brazil, including the Jersey cattle, the Devon cattle, the Karakul sheep and the Arabian horse, and contributed to the improvement of the Thoroughbred.

He was Brazil's ambassador to the United States from 1898 to 1902.
