= Social Progressive Party =

Social Progressive Party Partido Social Progressista
- Abbreviation: PSP
- Leader: Adhemar de Barros
- Founded: 1946
- Dissolved: 27 October 1965
- Ideology: Left-wing populism Conservatism
- Political position: Left-wing

The Progressive Social Party (Portuguese: Partido Social Progressista, PSP) was a left-wing populist and conservative political party in Brazil between 1946 and 1965, led by Adhemar de Barros. The result of a merger between smaller parties, it was, in practice, the fourth largest party after the Social Democratic Party, the National Democratic Union and the Brazilian Labour Party in the 1947-1965 era. Café Filho, the vice president of Getúlio Vargas and later president after Vargas committed suicide, was a member of the party, and the only member of the party to become president. It was extremely strong in the State of São Paulo, under the leadership of de Barros, who held the office of Governor and Mayor of São Paulo during this period, besides being a candidate for president in 1960, winning over 20% of the vote. Like all parties of the 1947-1965 era, it was abolished by the military government through the Institutional Act Number Two (AI-2) on 27 October 1965. A majority of PSP members later joined the military government party, the National Renewal Alliance (ARENA).

== Federal election results ==
Chamber of Deputies
Election	Votes	%	Seats	+/–
1947	309,531	14.8	1	new
1950	558,792	7.29	24	+23
1954	863,401	9.35	32	+12
1958				
1962				
