= Reform Progressive Party =

Reform Progressive Party Partido Progressista Reformador
- Abbreviation: PPR
- Leader: Esperidião Amin
- Founded: 1993
- Dissolved: 1995
- Merger of: Democratic Social Party; Christian Democratic Party
- Merged into: Brazilian Progressive Party
- Ideology: Conservatism; Christian democracy
- Political position: Centre-right

The Reform Progressive Party (Portuguese: Partido Progressista Reformador, PPR) was a centre-right Brazilian party, formed by the fusion of the Democratic Social Party (PDS) and the Christian Democratic Party (PDC) in 1993. Two years later the party, along with the Progressive Party, formed a new party called Brazilian Progressive Party. The leader of the party was Esperidião Amin, former governor of Santa Catarina in 1983-87.
