= Popular Representation Party =

Party of Popular Representation Partido de Representação Popular
- President: Plínio Salgado
- Founded: 26 September 1945
- Banned: 27 October 1965
- Preceded by: Brazilian Integralist Action
- Merged into: National Renewal Alliance
- Headquarters: Rio de Janeiro
- Ideology: Brazilian nationalism National conservatism Right-wing populism Brazilian Integralism
- Political position: Far-right
- Colours: Orange, green, yellow

The Popular Representation Party (Portuguese: Partido de Representação Popular, PRP) was a political party in Brazil. The PRP was founded by Plínio Salgado on 26 September 1945. He reassembled the former members of the Brazilian Integralism, and was ideologically aligned with the nationalist right. It always obtained representation in the Brazilian Congress and had a greater presence in the south. Salgado ran for President of Brazil in the 1955 election, won by Juscelino Kubitschek. He won around 8% of the vote.

Like all parties of that era, it was abolished by the military regime shortly after the coup of 1964. Most of its members joined the party of the military junta, the ARENA.
