= Liberator Party (Brazil) =

Political party in Brazil

Liberator Party Partido Libertador
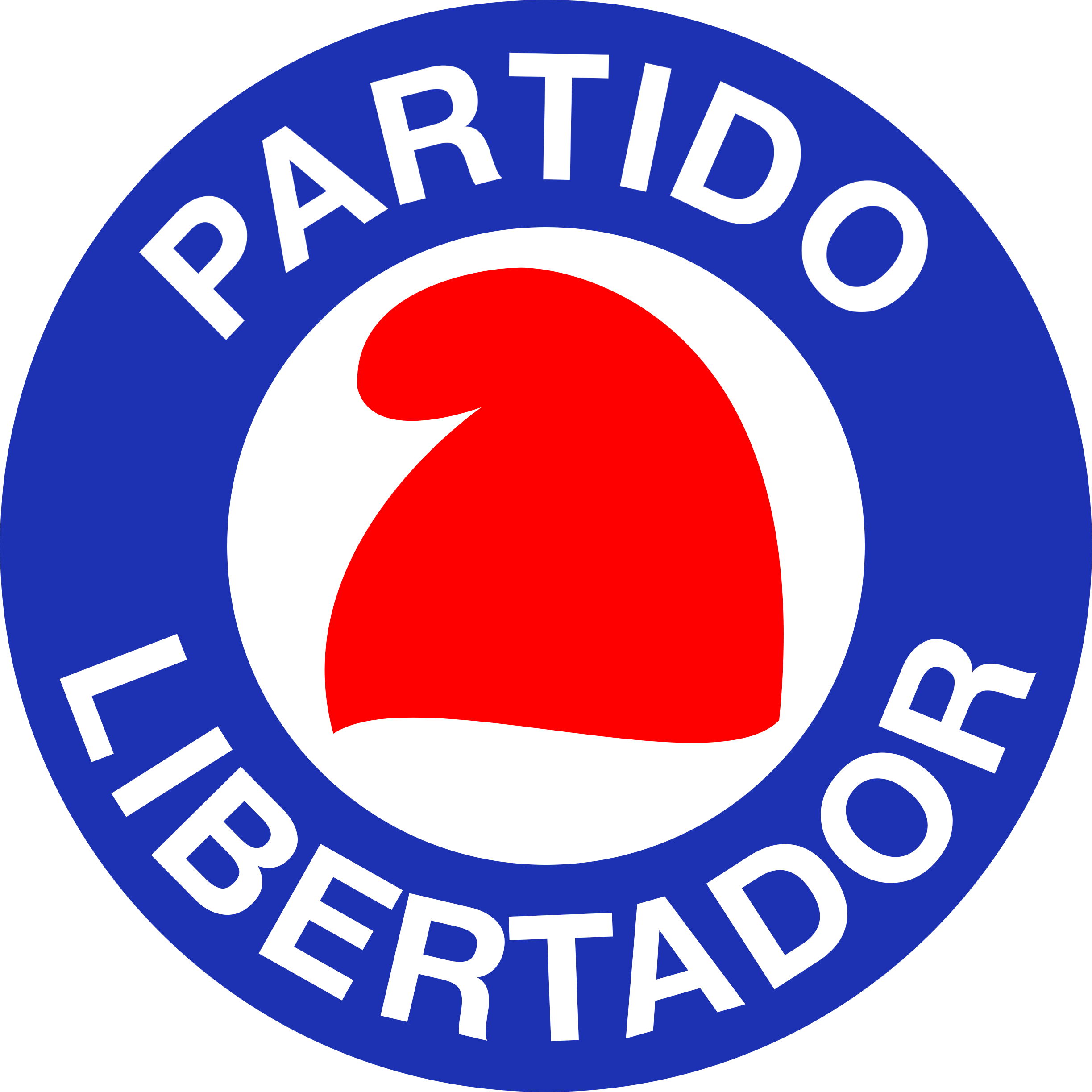
- Abbreviation: PL
- Founded: 1928
- Dissolved: 1965
- Preceded by: Rio Grande do Sul Federalist Party
- Succeeded by: National Renewal Alliance
- Headquarters: Porto Alegre, Rio Grande do Sul
- Ideology: Parliamentarism; Federalism; Liberal conservatism
- Political position: Centre-right
- National affiliation: Gaúcho United Front (1928–1932)
- Colors: Red; White

The Liberator Party (Portuguese: Partido Libertador, PL) was a political party in Brazil which existed for two periods between 1928 and 1937 and then between 1945 and 1965. The PL's first incarnation was founded by members of the Rio Grande do Sul Federalist Party, notably Joaquim Francisco de Assis Brasil and Placido Moreira Dias. Despite being the traditional opponents of the Riograndense Republican Party, it participated in the Gaucho United Front (Frente Única Gaúcha) which supported the candidacy of Getúlio Vargas in the 1930 election. It supported the Revolution of 1930 which led to the overthrow of the Old Republic and the accession of Vargas to the presidency. The PL was abolished in 1937, following Vargas' self-coup and the establishment of the Estado Novo.

The PL was re-founded in 1945, following the fall of the Estado Novo. Concentrated primarily in the pampas of Rio Grande do Sul, it supported a parliamentary system but never achieved electoral success.

Like all parties of that era, it was abolished by the military regime in 1965.
