= Adhemar de Barros =

Mayor (1957–1961), and governor (1947–1951 & 1963–1966) of São Paulo, Brazil

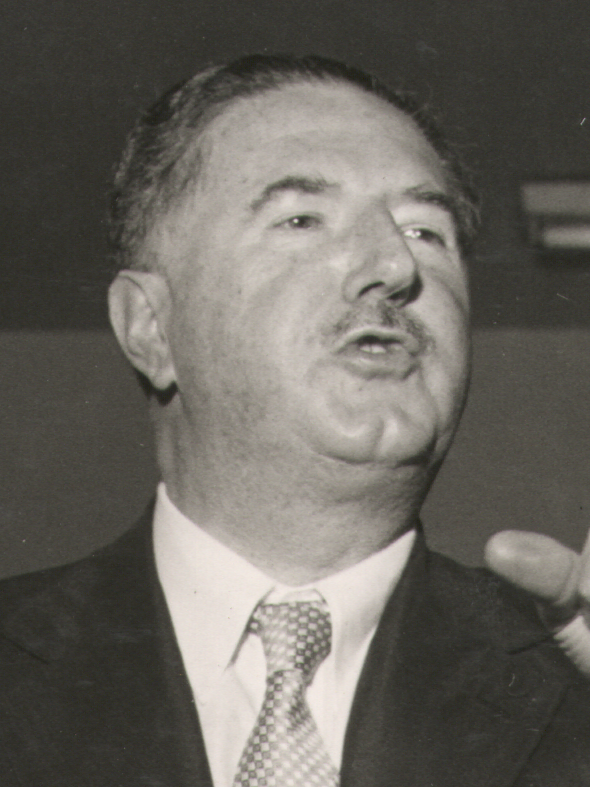

Governor of São Paulo
- In office 31 January 1963 – 6 June 1966
- Vice Governor: Laudo Natel
- Preceded by: Carvalho Pinto
- Succeeded by: Laudo Natel
- In office 14 March 1947 – 31 January 1951
- Vice Governor: Luiz Gonzaga Novelli
- Preceded by: Carvalho Pinto
- Succeeded by: Laudo Natel

26th Mayor of São Paulo
- In office 8 April 1957 – 8 April 1961
- Preceded by: Vladimir de Toledo Piza
- Succeeded by: Francisco Prestes Maia

Federal Intervenor in São Paulo
- In office 27 April 1938 – 4 June 1941
- Appointed by: Getúlio Vargas
- Preceded by: Francisco José da Silva
- Succeeded by: Fernando de Sousa Costa

Personal details
- Born: 22 April 1901 Piracicaba, Brazil
- Died: 12 March 1969 (aged 67) Paris, France
- Party: Social Progressive Party (PSP)

Adhemar Pereira de Barros (22 April 1901 – 12 March 1969) was the mayor of São Paulo (1957–1961), and twice elected Governor of São Paulo (1947–1951 & 1963–1966).

Barros was born in Piracicaba, Brazil. He was the federal interventor in the state of São Paulo nominated by Brazilian dictator Getúlio Vargas, serving between 1938 and 1941. Following the re-democratization, he was elected Governor of São Paulo with a large margin in the 1947 elections, relying on a large coalition which included working-class support. Known to be a populist, he built a strong electoral machine, the Social Progressive Party (PSP), which dominated state politics until 1964. He was accused of being corrupt, but he was responsible for advances in social legislation and infrastructure: his candid supporters said "rouba mas faz" (he steals but he gets things done). He did not run for re-election in 1950, and was defeated by Jânio Quadros in 1954, before winning in 1962.

After having lent support to Getúlio Vargas in 1950, he ran for President in his own right in 1955 and 1960. In the latter election he was placed third behind the eventual winner, Jânio Quadros who defeated him in the 1954 gubernatorial election by less than 1%. In 1964 he supported the president João Goulart's downfall, but in 1966 he fell from the military's favor. He died, aged 67, in Paris, France. His nephew, Reynaldo de Barros, was also mayor of São Paulo.
