= National Renewal Alliance =

National Renewal Alliance Aliança Renovadora Nacional
- President: Ernesto Geisel (last)
- Founded: 4 April 1966
- Dissolved: 20 December 1979
- Merger of: National Democratic Union; Social Progressive Party; Popular Representation Party; Republican Party; Social Democratic Party (minority); National Labour Party (factions); Christian Democratic Party (factions)
- Succeeded by: Democratic Social Party
- Headquarters: Brasília, Federal District, Brazil
- Ideology: Authoritarian conservatism Brazilian nationalism Anti-communism; State capitalism Militarism
- Political position: Far-right
- Colours: Dark blue

Party flag

The National Renewal Alliance (Portuguese: Aliança Renovadora Nacional, ARENA) was a far-right political party that existed in Brazil between 1966 and 1979. It was the official party of the military dictatorship that ruled Brazil from 1964 to 1985.

ARENA was part of a two-party system enforced by the dictatorship instituted in 1966, where only it and the Brazilian Democratic Movement (MDB) — the "consented opposition" — were allowed. In 1979, a multi-party system was reintroduced to Brazil, both MDB and ARENA were officially dissolved, and the Democratic Social Party (PDS) was founded as a continuation of ARENA. Soon thereafter, PDS had a split which saw the creation of the Liberal Front Party (PFL), current Brazil Union (UNIÃO), while PDS merged with the PDC in 1993 became the Reform Progressive Party (PPR), which became the current Progressives (PP) in 1995.

== History ==
Until 1965, there were three main parties in Brazil: the populist Brazilian Labour Party (PTB), the centrist Social Democratic Party (PSD) and the conservative National Democratic Union (UDN). In 1964, the government of President João Goulart was overthrown by a military coup d'etat, but in contrast to other Latin American dictatorships, the Brazilian military-controlled government did not abolish Congress. Instead, in 1965, the government banned all existing political parties and created a two-party system. ARENA, the pro-government party, was formed by politicians from the bulk of the UDN, the Social Progressive Party of Adhemar de Barros (a supporter of the coup) and the integralist Popular Representation Party, plus the most right-wing factions of the PSD, the National Labour Party and the Christian Democratic Party. The main body of the PSD joined most of the PTB in forming the Brazilian Democratic Movement (MDB), the opposition.

ARENA had no real ideology other than support for the military, who used it mostly to rubber-stamp its agenda. In the elections of 1966 and 1970, ARENA won a vast majority of seats. Most agree that, at first, the MDB did not have any chance to pass or block any legislation. It also rubber-stamped the military leadership's choice of president. Under the military's constitution, the president was nominally elected by an absolute majority of both chambers meeting in joint session. In practice, ARENA's majority was so massive that its candidate could not possibly be defeated. During most of the early part of the military regime, Brazil was, for all intents and purposes, a one-party state. Indeed, during the first two elections under military rule, the MDB didn't even put up a presidential candidate.

However, ARENA was not completely subservient. For example, in the late 1968 President Artur da Costa e Silva demanded that Congress prosecute the congressman Márcio Moreira Alves for suggesting that women should refuse to dance with military cadets. Congress turned the demand down, prompting Costa e Silva to issue the heavy-handed Fifth Institutional Act, which allowed him to close Congress and rule by decree. Almost as soon as he signed AI-5 into law, Costa e Silva used its provisions to close Congress for almost two years, thus placing Brazil under a tight dictatorship.

Despite the large volume of studies on the Brazilian military dictatorship, little is known about ARENA. There are historical doubts about the formation of the party, the reasons for the adhesion of most UDN members to ARENA, the ideological currents that permeated the ARENA party program and the extent to which ARENA was independent from the military.

In the 1974 legislative elections, MDB took many more seats than expected. It actually won a majority in the Senate, and came up just short of a majority in the Chamber of Deputies. The government reacted by decreeing the recess of the National Congress and editing on April 13, 1977 a set of constitutional amendments and decree-laws known as April Package (Pacote de Abril) which provided for the appointment of a third of senators, extended the presidential term to six years, restricted opposition power and even succeeded in annulling the mandates of some Congressmen of the MDB.

In 1979, in a manoeuvre to divide the opposition, the government ended the bipartisan party system, and ARENA was dissolved when the new political parties law became effective on 20 December 1979. In January 1980, most of ARENA's former members founded the Democratic Social Party (PDS) as a continuation of ARENA.

== Electoral history ==
=== Presidential elections ===
Election	Party candidate	Running mate	Electoral votes	%	Result
1966	Artur da Costa e Silva	Pedro Aleixo	294	100%	Elected ✓
1969	Emílio Garrastazu Médici	Augusto Rademaker	293	100%	Elected ✓
1974	Ernesto Geisel	Adalberto Pereira dos Santos	400	84%	Elected ✓
1978	João Figueiredo	Aureliano Chaves	355	61.10%	Elected ✓

=== Chamber of Deputies elections ===
Election	Party leader	Votes	%	Seats	+/–	Position	Result
1966	Artur da Costa e Silva	8,731,638	64.0%	277 / 409	▲277	▲1st	Supermajority government
1970	Emílio Garrastazu Médici	10,867,814	69.5%	223 / 310	▼54	1st	Supermajority government
1974	Ernesto Geisel	11,866,599	52.2 %	203 / 364	▼20	1st	Majority government
1978	Ernesto Geisel	15,053,387	50.4%	231 / 422	▲28	1st	Majority government

=== Senate elections ===
Election	Party leader	Votes	%	Seats	+/–	Position	Result
1966	Artur da Costa e Silva	7,719,382	56.6%	19 / 23	▲19	▲1st	Supermajority
1970	Emílio Garrastazu Médici	20,524,470	60.4%	40 / 46	▲21	1st	Supermajority
1974	Ernesto Geisel	10,067,796	41.0%	6 / 22	▼34	▼2nd	Minority
1978	Ernesto Geisel	13,116,194	42.9%	15 / 23	▲5	▲1st	Majority

== Notorious members ==
Former members
Name	Birth date	Death date	Relevant offices by ARENA	Relevant offices by other parties
Artur da Costa e Silva	3 October 1899	17 December 1969	President of Brazil (1967—1969, by ARENA); Minister of War (1964—1966, by ARENA and with no party)	Minister of Mines and Energy (1964, with no party)
Humberto Castelo Branco	20 September 1897	18 July 1967	President of Brazil (1964—1967, by ARENA and with no party)	
Emílio Garrastazu Médici	4 December 1905	9 October 1985	President of Brazil (1969—1974, by ARENA)	
Ernesto Geisel	3 August 1907	12 September 1996	President of Brazil (1974—1979, by ARENA).	
João Figueiredo	15 January 1918	24 December 1999	President of Brazil (1979—1985, by PDS and ARENA).	
Pedro Aleixo	1 August 1901	3 March 1975	President-designate of Brazil (1969, by ARENA); Vice President of Brazil (1967—1969, by ARENA); Minister of Education (1966, by ARENA); Federal Deputy for Minas Gerais (1959—1966, by ARENA and UDN, and 1935—1937, by PP)	President of the Chamber of Deputies (1937, by PP)
Aureliano Chaves	13 January 1929	30 April 2003	Vice President of Brazil (1979—1985, by PDS and ARENA); Governor of Minas Gerais (1975—1978, by ARENA); Federal Deputy for Minas Gerais (1967—1975, by ARENA)	Minister of Mines and Energy (1985—1988, by PFL and PDS)
José Maria Alkmin	11 June 1901	22 April 1974	Vice President of Brazil (1964—1967, by ARENA and PSD); Federal Deputy for Minas Gerais (1973—1974, 1970—1971, 1967, 1958—1964, 1955—1956, 1946—1951 and 1933—1935, by ARENA, PSD and with no party)	Minister of Finance (1956—1958, by PSD)
Adalberto Pereira dos Santos	11 April 1905	2 April 1984	Vice President of Brazil (1974—1979, by ARENA)	
José Sarney	24 April 1930	living	Governor of Maranhão (1966—1970, by ARENA); Senator for Maranhão (1971—1985, by ARENA, PDS and MDB)	President of Brazil (1985—1990, by MDB); Vice President of Brazil (1985, by MDB); President of the Federal Senate (2009—2013, by MDB, 2003—2005, by MDB, and 1995—1997, by MDB); Senator for Amapá (1991—2015, by MDB)
Antônio Carlos Magalhães	4 September 1927	20 July 2007	Governor of Bahia (1991—1994, by PFL, 1979—1983, by PDS and ARENA, and 1971—1975, by ARENA); Mayor of Salvador (1967—1970, by ARENA)	President of the Federal Senate (1997—2001, by PFL); Senator for Bahia (2003—2007, by PFL, and 1995—2001, by PFL); Minister of Communications (1985—1990, by PFL and PDS)
Paulo Maluf	3 September 1931	living	Governor of São Paulo (1979—1982, by PDS and ARENA); Mayor of São Paulo (1993—1997, by PPR and Progressives, and 1969—1971, by ARENA)	Federal Deputy for São Paulo (2007—2018, by Progressives, and 1983—1987, by PDS)
Jorge Kalume	3 December 1920	26 October 2010	Governor of Acre (1966—1971, by ARENA); Senator for Acre (1979—1987, by PDS and ARENA)	Mayor of Rio Branco (1989—1993, by PDS); Federal Deputy for Acre (1963—1966, by PSD)
Paulo Barreto Menezes	9 October 1925	15 February 2016	Governor of Sergipe (1971—1975, by ARENA)	
Fernando Collor de Mello	12 August 1949	living	Mayor of Maceió (1979—1983, by ARENA and PDS)	President of Brazil (1990—1992, by Act); Governor of Alagoas (1987—1989, by MDB and Act); Senator for Alagoas (2019—present, by Act, PROS and PL, and 2007—2019, by PTB and Act); Federal Deputy for Alagoas (1983—1986, by PDS)
João Alves Filho	3 July 1941	24 November 2020	Mayor of Aracaju (2013—2017, by PFL, and 1975—1979, by ARENA)	Governor of Sergipe (2003—2007, by PFL, 1991—1995, by PFL, and 1983—1987, by PDS and PFL); Minister of Internal Affairs (1987—1990, by PFL)
José Maria Marin	6 May 1932	living	Vice Governor of São Paulo (1979—1982, by PDS and ARENA); State deputy of São Paulo (1971—1979, by ARENA)	Governor of São Paulo (1982—1983, by PDS)
Omar Sabino	25 July 1932	22 July 2011	Vice Governor of Acre (1975—1979, by ARENA)	
Vasco Azevedo Neto	25 February 1916	30 September 2010	Federal Deputy for Minas Gerais (1970—1986, by PSC, PFL, PDS and ARENA)	
