= Christian Democratic Party (Brazil) =

Christian Democratic Party Partido Democrata Cristão
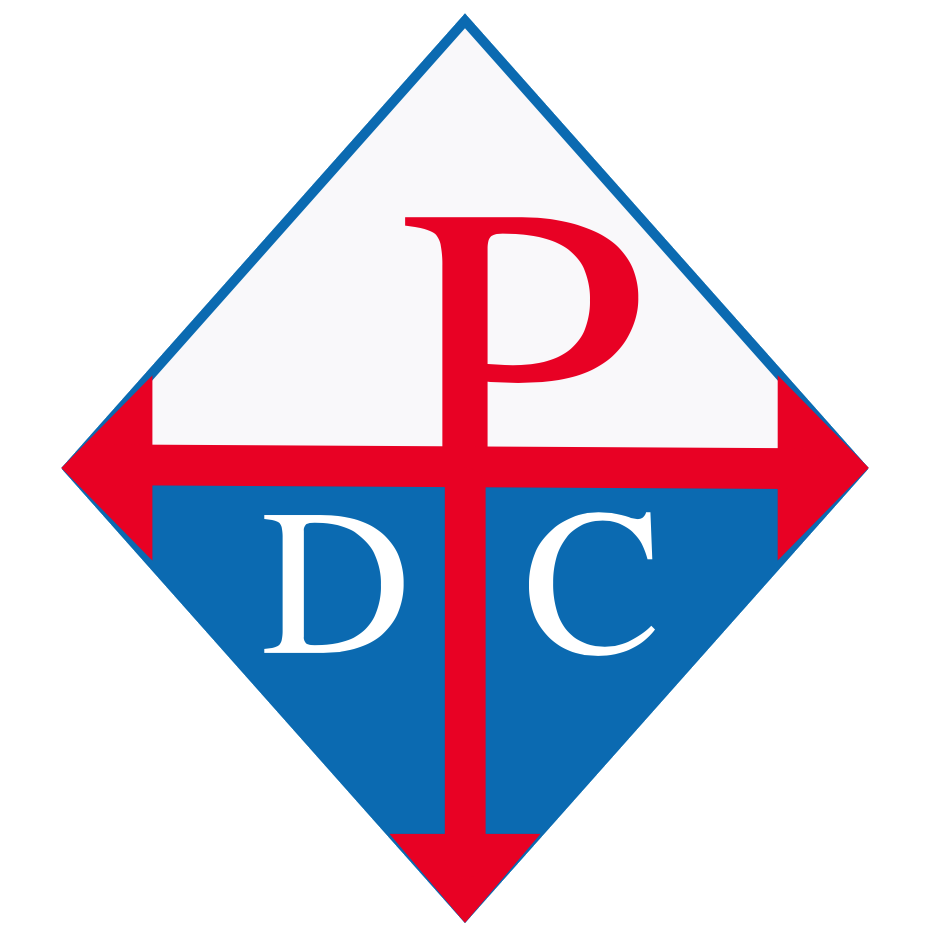
- Abbreviation: PDC
- Founded: 9 July 1945; 1985
- Dissolved: 27 October 1965; 4 April 1993
- Merged into: Reform Progressive Party
- Ideology: Christian democracy Faction: Christian left
- Political position: Centre; Factions: Centre-left to centre-right
- Religion: Catholicism

The Christian Democratic Party (Portuguese: Partido Democrata Cristão, PDC) was a centrist political party in Brazil founded in 1945. The PDC, a small party supporting traditional Christian values, never achieved electoral success and was banned by the military government in 1965.

The party was re-created following the fall of the military in 1985, and subsequently merged with other parties, including the Democratic Social Party, to form the right-wing Brazilian Progressive Party (PPB) in 1993.

The former president of Brazil Jair Bolsonaro was a member of the party from 1988 to the merging with Democratic Social Party.
