= National Democratic Union (Brazil) =

Defunct political party in Brazil

National Democratic Union União Democrática Nacional
- President: See list below
- Secretary-General: See list below
- Founder: Carlos Lacerda
- Founded: 7 April 1945
- Dissolved: 27 October 1965
- Ideology: Anti-communism; Classical liberalism Economic liberalism Liberal conservatism
- Political position: Centre-right
- Colours: Blue, White, & Red

The National Democratic Union (Portuguese: União Democrática Nacional, UDN) was a political party that existed in Brazil between 1945 and 1965. It was ideologically aligned with conservatism. During most of its existence, it was the country's second-strongest party. Its symbol was an Olympic torch and its motto was "The price of freedom is eternal vigilance".

== History ==
At the end of Getúlio Vargas' Estado Novo regime in 1945, political parties were allowed to reorganize themselves and to run in the general elections of that year. UDN grouped the main leaders of the opposition against the populism of the outgoing president. This constant opposition to Vargas was the party's main characteristic. Therefore, its main opponents were the Social Democratic Party (PSD) and the Brazilian Labour Party (PTB), formed to give support to Vargas among the elite and the working class, respectively.

UDN was defeated in the presidential elections of 1945, 1950 and 1955, but remained the second largest party in the National Congress, second only to PSD, from 1945 until 1962, when it was surpassed by PTB. The main political figure of UDN was Carlos Lacerda, a staunch enemy of Vargas, whose second presidency (1951–1954) was bitterly opposed by UDN. An assassination attempt against Lacerda led to Vargas' suicide. On 1960, UDN preferred not to launch a presidential candidate, supporting the victorious Jânio Quadros instead. Although Quadros was not a UDN member himself, most of the ministers in the Quadros Cabinet were members of UDN. The party was soon dissatisfied with Quadros, who resigned in a clumsy political maneuver. Without UDN's support, Quadros lost the majority of seats in the Congress, and soon found out it was impossible to govern without the backing of the Parliament. On August 21, 1961, just eight months after his inauguration, he resigned, hoping to return to power via popular acclaim.

Vice President João Goulart from PTB (at that time, Brazilians would vote for president and Vice President separately) then took office. As soon as 1962, some elements of UDN began to conspire with military officers to topple him. A political protégé of Vargas, Goulart launched a Basic Reforms plan, encompassing education reform, land reform, urban reform, electoral reform and tax reform. That was labelled by UDN as a Soviet influence on Brazilian politics. Goulart's reforms alienated some members of the moderate PSD, leading to withdrawal of its support to the Goulart government in the National Congress, thus leaving the President in a complicated situation. In April 1964, Goulart was deposed by 1964 Brazilian coup d'état, which had the support of many UDN members. Lacerda, then governor of the Guanabara State, hoped to win the scheduled presidential election of 1965. However, the military regime cancelled this election and suppressed all the political parties, including UDN, during the creation of the Institutional Act Number 2, leading to the creation of the Frente Ampla (Broad Front), a short-lived and ill-fated political movement compromising of Carlos Lacerda himself and former rivals then-deposed President João Goulart and former President Juscelino Kubitschek. The makeshift alliance aimed at the re-establishment of democratic elections in Brazil and the deposition of the recently installed Military Regime. By then, however, many of UDN's members and Lacerda's coreligionists had already joined the National Renewal Alliance Party (Aliança Renovadora Nacional – Arena), a new party created to endorse and support the military regime, along with some members of Goulart's and Kubitschek's parties, dooming the movement to effective extinction after the creation of Institutional Act Number Five, the forced exile of many of its supporters and the establishment of the newly created Brazilian Democratic Movement (Movimento Democrático Brasileiro - MDB) as the official and legal opposition to the regime, which counted with little but existent participation of some elements in the former UDN.

== Ideology ==
Even before UDN supported the 1964 Brazilian Coup d'état, opponents of UDN characterized it as a golpista (pro-coups d'état) party. However, the party was not conservative as a whole. Liberal and authoritarian, conservative and progressive theses coexisted in UDN. For instance, it voted in favor of the state monopoly on oil and against the impeachment of Communist members of the Congress. On the other hand, it denounced the "Communist infiltration" in public administration, and strongly opposed government intervention in the economy. Members of the Democratic Left faction, which defected UDN to form the Brazilian Socialist Party (PSB), characterized the party as a free market advocate, citing this as one of the reasons for the defection. Contesting the results whenever losing an election was also a common practice inside UDN.

The party was marked by binding itself with the Brazilian Army and the aspirations of urban middle classes, all of which became unofficially known as "udenismo". An expression of the attitudes of its leaders towards politics, "udenismo" was characterized by defending classical liberalism, advocating higher education and traditional morality, and repulsing populism.

== Electoral performance ==
Chamber					Senate
Year	Votes	% of votes	Seats	% of seats^{1}	Seats^{2}
1945	1,575,375	26.6	81	28.3	12
1947	677.374	32.4	5	26.3	8
1950	1,812,849	24.7	81	26.6	3
1954	1,936,935	21.9	74	22.7	18
1958	2,319,713	21.1	70	21.5	11
1962	2,547,207	22.6	97	23.7	14
1 Percentage of seats up for election that year. 2 Includes all seats from UDN's coalitions. Source: Rio de Janeiro State University

== Presidents ==
- 1945–1947: Otávio Mangabeira
- 1947–1949: José Américo de Almeida
- 1949–1951: Prado Kelly
- 1951–1953: Odilon Braga
- 1953–1955: Arthur Ferreira dos Santos
- 1955–1957: Milton Campos
- 1957–1959: Juracy Magalhães
- 1959–1961: José de Magalhães Pinto
- 1961–1963: Herbert Levy
- 1963–1965: Olavo Bilac Pinto
- 1965: Ernani Sátiro

== Secretaries-General ==
- 1945–1947: Virgílio de Melo Franco
- 1947–1949: Aliomar Baleeiro
- 1949–1951: José Monteiro de Castro
- 1951–1953: Rui Santos
- 1953–1955: Virgílio Távora
- 1955–1957: João Agripino Filho
- 1957–1959: Guilherme Machado
- 1959–1961: Aluízio Alves
- 1961–1963: Ernani Sátiro
- 1963–1965: Rui Santos
- 1965: Oscar Dias Correia
