= Brazilian Labour Party (1945) =

1945–1965 political party in Brazil

Brazilian Labour Party Partido Trabalhista Brasileiro
- Leader: Getúlio Vargas (1945–1954); João Goulart (1954–1965)
- Founder: Getúlio Vargas
- Founded: 15 May 1945
- Dissolved: 27 October 1965
- Merged into: Brazilian Democratic Movement
- Succeeded by: Brazilian Labour Party (de jure); Democratic Labour Party (de facto)
- Ideology: Getulism; Populism; Developmentalism; Corporatism; Labourism; Brazilian nationalism Protectionism
- Political position: Centre-left to left-wing
- Colours: Black, White, & Red

The Brazilian Labour Party (Portuguese: Partido Trabalhista Brasileiro, PTB) was a populist political party in Brazil founded in 1945 by supporters of President Getúlio Vargas. From 1945 until 1965, PTB was one of the main parties of Brazil, along with its more centrist ally PSD and main rival UDN. After Vargas's suicide in 1954, João Goulart became the central figure in the party along with his brother-in-law Leonel Brizola. Goulart was elected Vice President of Brazil twice (1955 and 1960) and became President of Brazil in 1961, but was removed after the 1964 Brazilian coup d'état. The new military regime dismantled PTB by the Institutional Act Number Two in 1965. Most of the PTB's members went to join the Brazilian Democratic Movement or were exiled from Brazil.

After the return of the multi-party system in 1979, Brizola attempted to refound PTB, but the name was given to a more right-leaning group led by Ivete Vargas, Getúlio's grand-niece, in 1980, and Brizola and most members of the PTB founded the Democratic Labour Party (PDT) instead.

== History ==
The party was founded by followers of President Getúlio Vargas on May 15, 1945, during the final days of his Estado Novo. It grew rapidly under the leadership of Vargas, the most important Brazilian politician of the early to mid-20th century. Its main goal was to prevent a growth of Communist Party membership among urban workers. According to Vargas himself, the party was created to "serve as a buffer between the unions and the communists."

PTB's support came from the trade unions controlled by the Ministry of Labour, and its trump card was the prestige of Getúlio Vargas, its honorary chairman, which introduced social and labor legislation in the country. From 1945 to 1962, PTB was the third force in Brazilian politics, after the Social Democratic Party (PSD) and the National Democratic Union (UDN), but it became more popular than the UDN in the 1962 Congressional elections. In 1950, Vargas was elected to a second term through PTB. Vargas committed suicide in 1954, and his heir João Goulart became the central figure in the party along with the populist Leonel Brizola.

Since the party was a close ally of PSD, also founded by supporters of the late Vargas, it remained in power when Juscelino Kubitschek was elected president in 1955. Goulart was elected vice president in 1955 and 1960, becoming president in 1961 with the resignation of Jânio Quadros. PTB was in power again, but Goulart was overthrown by a military-led coup d'état in 1964. Various PTB figures were removed from the National Congress, and all political parties, including PTB, were dissolved on October 27, 1965. Nearly all of the party merged with the bulk of the PSD to form the Brazilian Democratic Movement, the only opposition party permitted for the first decade of the military dictatorship.

A new PTB, this time a centre-right party, was established by Ivete Vargas, Getúlio's grand-niece, in 1980, with the end of the artificial two-party system imposed by the military regime. Brizola led the majority of the PTB's former followers into the Democratic Labour Party.
