= Social Democratic Party (Brazil, 1945–1965) =

Social Democratic Party Partido Social Democrático
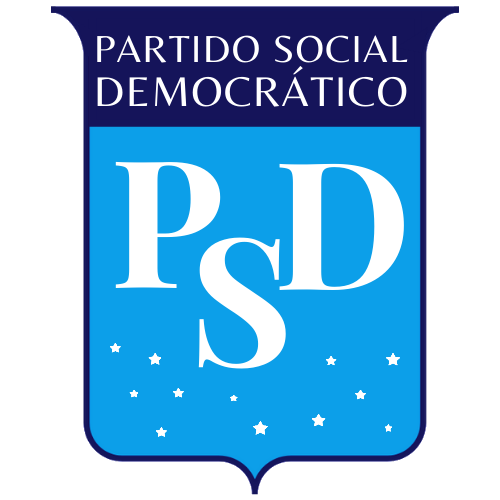
- Chairperson (s): Nereu Ramos; Cirilo Júnior; Ernâni Amaral Peixoto; Amaral Peixoto
- Founder: Getúlio Vargas
- Founded: 17 July 1945
- Dissolved: 27 October 1965
- Merged into: Brazilian Democratic Movement (majority); National Renewal Alliance (minority)
- Headquarters: Edifício Piauí, avenida Almirante Barroso, nº 72; Rio de Janeiro
- Ideology: Getulism; Populism; Developmentalism; Corporatism; Centrism; Factions: Conservatism; Liberalism
- Political position: Centre
- Colours: Blue & White
- TSE Identification Number: 41

The Social Democratic Party (Portuguese: Partido Social Democrático, PSD) was a political party in Brazil between 1945 and 1965. It was founded by Getúlio Vargas when he transformed his Estado Novo into a multi-party system. The PSD was a centrist party which represented the more conservative wing of the Getulist movement. The other pro-Vargas party was the Brazilian Labour Party (PTB).

The PSD was the most important Brazilian political party during the 1945–1964 democratic period, electing Presidents Eurico Gaspar Dutra in 1945 and Juscelino Kubitschek in 1955. After the coup d'état in 1964, when military dictatorship kicked in, it was banned together with all other parties.

The party relied on powerful networks of rural elites in the less-developed parts of the country. It was dominated by executives appointed by the Getúlio Vargas regime and was therefore strongly interwoven with the state apparatus. It was ideologically moderate, considered centrist by some scholars and conservative by others. Some historians have compared the role of PSD in Brazilian politics at the time similar to what the Brazilian Democratic Movement (MDB) and the Centrão has in modern politics after the Redemocratization: that of a catch-all party with a loosely-defined ideological program, mostly focused on negotiate support for the government in exchange for positions, resources and political influence. Future President-elect of Brazil Tancredo Neves, at the time member of PSD, said that “Between the Bible and Capital, the PSD gets the Government gazette.”

The PSD's representation in the Brazilian Chamber of Deputies steadily shrank from 52.8% of the seats in 1945 to 28.9% in 1962. By 1963, the Labour Party, PSD's minor opposition party, had more seats than the PSD. A considerable faction within the PSD turned against President João Goulart, a PTB member who had been Vice President until he stood in for retired President Jânio Quadros in 1961, whom they deemed to be too leftist. They therefore supported the military coup d'état on 1 April 1964, making an important contribution to the success of the overthrow.

During the military rule installed by the 1964 coup, the bulk of the party, including most of its leaders, joined the Brazilian Democratic Movement (MDB), the only legal opposition party. A few elements of the PSD's right wing joined the pro-government National Renewal Alliance Party (ARENA).

A second Social Democratic Party was founded in 1987, after the end of the dictatorship. It was based in the rural center-west and led by Ronaldo Caiado, leader of the right-wing landowners' association União Democrática Ruralista. In elections it remained completely unimportant. In 2011 a new Social Democratic Party was founded by Gilberto Kassab from dissidents of the Democrats (DEM) and other parties, while it doesn't claim heritage with the original PSD from 1945, it does share a similar form of centrism and catch-all politics.

== Literature ==
- Hippólito, Lucia (1985), De Raposas e Reformistas: O PSD e a experiência democrática brasileira (1945-64), Paz e Terra
- Mainwaring, Scott; Meneguello, Rachel; Power, Timothy J. (2000), "Conservative Parties, Democracy, and Economic Reform in Contemporary Brazil", Conservative Parties, the Right, and Democracy in Latin America, The Johns Hopkins University Press, pp. 164–222
