= Presidency of Eurico Gaspar Dutra =

Brazilian presidential administration (1946–1951)

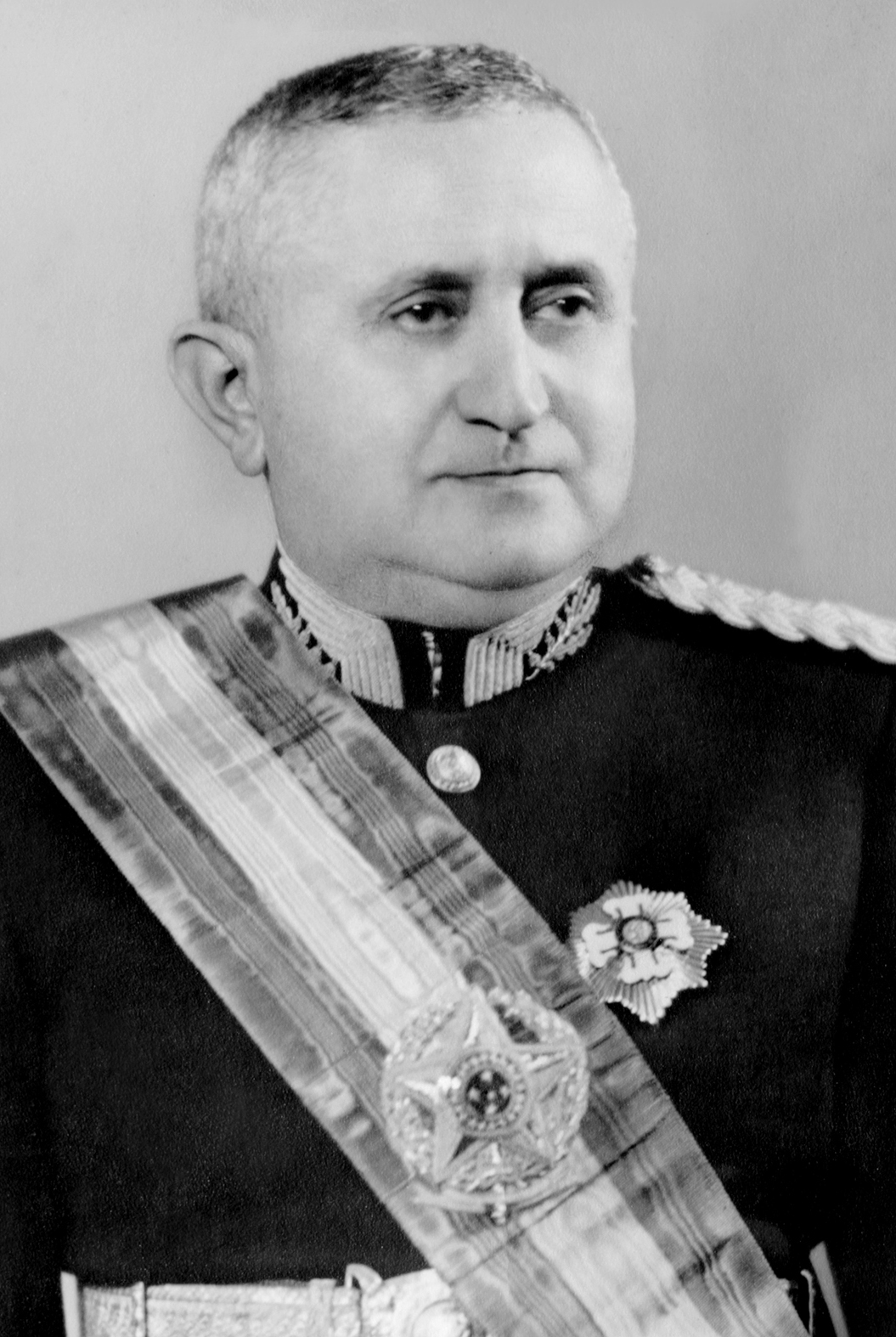
- Official portrait, 1946
- Presidency of Eurico Gaspar Dutra; 31 January 1946 – 31 January 1951
- Vice President: Nereu Ramos
- Party: PSD
- Election: 1945 presidential election
- Seat: Catete Palace
- Standard of the President

The presidency of Eurico Gaspar Dutra began on 31 January 1946, after he won the 1945 election with 3,251,507 votes against 2,039,341 votes for Eduardo Gomes, making him Brazil's 16th president. It ended on 31 January 1951, when Getúlio Vargas took office.

His administration was characterized by the outbreak of the Cold War, with Dutra fully aligning himself with the United States and tearing up relations with the Soviet Union. The period also witnessed discussions on oil policy, the ban on gambling in Brazil, which has lasted to this day, and the SALTE Plan. During his time in office, Brazil's GDP grew by an average of 7.6%, one of the highest growth rates in the country's history.

== 1945 elections ==
Dutra stood as a candidate for the Social Democratic Party (PSD), in coalition with the Brazilian Labour Party (PTB), and won the elections on 2 December 1945, with 3,351,507 votes, beating Eduardo Gomes of the National Democratic Union and Yedo Fiúza of the Communist Party of Brazil. The 1945 elections took place under the 1937 constitution, which did not include a vice-president. However, Nereu Ramos, a politician from Santa Catarina, also from the PSD, was chosen for the post by the 1946 National Constituent Assembly.

== Presidency ==
=== Inauguration ===
Inauguration of Eurico Gaspar Dutra.

Dutra took office on 31 January 1946, along with the inauguration of the National Constituent Assembly, in a climate of freedom after years of Vargas' dictatorial regime.

Politics

To establish a democratic rule that lasted 19 years, a constitutional pact was made between the major parties of the liberal center, the PSD and the UDN, although left-wing parties such as the Communist Party of Brazil (PCB) and the PTB were also active. Dutra initially allowed them to criticise the government until 1947, when its leader, Senator Luis Carlos Prestes, announced that if the Soviet Union and the Brazil were to go to war, Brazilian communists would support the Soviet Union. Brazil heavily shifted to the American camp during the cold war. Still, Dutra typically did not interfere in decisions, even when his term was reduced from six to five years.

=== Economy ===
Dutra tried to use the principles of laissez faire liberalism, suspending exchange rate controls and allowing the import of manufactured goods to avoid a rise in inflation.

Dutra's trade policy was criticized for its poor use of the foreign currency accumulated during the war, and for misjudging the situation of the reserves. In 1946, half of the savings were in gold and the other half, US$235 million were in blocked pounds sterling and only US$92 million were actually liquid and usable in countries with convertible currencies. One of the origins of the problem was that Brazil had a surplus with inconvertible currency areas and deficits with the US and other countries. Also, in the post-war period, there was no influx of public or private capital into Brazil, which was not a priority in the new global context.

The overvalued exchange rate, by discouraging the supply of the product, could be used to support international coffee prices, but it acted as a disincentive to the export sector, deflecting investment towards production for the domestic market. The spurt of economic development that resulted from this policy was called "spontaneous industrialization", which was assisted by a more liberal credit policy. Between 1946 and 1952, the average annual growth rate of real output was 6.2%, while industrial output grew by 7.9%. The composition of GDP changed: agriculture went from 37% in 1939 to 31.8% in 1951, while industry grew from 17.5% to 19.6% in the same period. Supported by the inauguration of the Companhia Siderúrgica Nacional, Brazilian steel production rose from 205,935 tons in 1945 to 788,557 tons in 1950.

During this period, the cost of living rose by 60%, but the minimum wage remained the same as Vargas had set it in December 1943 (between 240 old cruzeiros in Recife and 380 in Rio de Janeiro).

=== Infrastructure ===
Inauguration of the Companhia Siderúrgica Nacional by President Eurico Gaspar Dutra, 1946. On the left of the photo is the then senator from Santa Catarina, Nereu Ramos

Based on a developmentalist approach, Eurico Dutra gathered suggestions from various ministries and gave priority to four areas: Health (Saúde), Food (Alimentação), Transport (Transporte) and Energy (Energia), whose initials form the acronym SALTE. The resources for implementing the SALTE Plan would come from the Federal Revenue Service and foreign loans. However, the resistance of the conservative coalition and the orthodoxy of the economic team eventually made the plan unviable.

During Dutra's administration, BR-2 (now Rodovia Presidente Dutra), the highway linking Rio de Janeiro to São Paulo, was built and inaugurated; in 1967, it was duplicated. On leaving office, Dutra's road policy was praised by the press. An editorial in the newspaper A Noite stated that it was the sector that had produced the most "voluminous and fruitful" results, with the alleged construction of 500 km of roads during his administration.

=== Oil policy ===
In 1945, the president of the National Petroleum Council (CNP), Colonel João Carlos Barreto, defended the participation of foreign private capital in the oil industry, as long as it was integrated into companies incorporated in Brazil, contrary to the 1937 Constitution; this argument was used in the drafting of the 1946 Constitution.

In February 1947, Dutra appointed a commission, under the direction of the CNP, to draw up the Petroleum Statute, to define how the country, whose consumption of the product was growing rapidly, would deal with the problem. During the drafting process, the Oil Campaign was created with the slogan "O petróleo é nosso" (English: "Oil is ours").

The Statute was sent to Congress at the beginning of 1948, without Dutra's clear opinion, as if it were a study and not a bill. The document established the principle of the product's public utility clearly, but considered total nationalization impossible due to a lack of funds and specialized technicians. When it was published, it displeased everyone, both the nationalists, who adopted the thesis of a state monopoly, and the big corporations, who wanted to exploit Brazilian oil in the same way as Venezuelan oil.

In April 1948, the Center for the Study and Defense of Oil and the National Economy (CEDPEN) was created, with Artur Bernardes and generals Horta Barbosa, José Pessoa and Estêvão Leitão de Carvalho as its honorary presidents. In October, the organization formally adopted, at a national convention, the thesis of a state monopoly for all phases of oil exploration.

=== Main measures ===
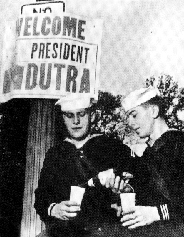
Americans welcome President Dutra to the United States

Dutra at the Opening of the 1950 World Cup

Dutra created the General Staff, which would later become the Brazilian Army General Staff (EMFA). During his administration, the federal territories of Ponta Porã and Iguaçu were abolished. On 30 April 1946, he banned gambling in Brazil and demanded the closure of all casinos.

=== Sport and culture ===
On 18 September 1950, TV Tupi, the first television station in Brazil and South America, was inaugurated. Between June 24 and July 16 of that year, Brazil hosted the FIFA World Cup, the first after World War II. In the final match, the Uruguayan team defeated Brazil at the Maracanã Stadium and lifted the World Cup title.

=== Foreign relations ===
The Dutra government's foreign policy was strongly marked by the outbreak of the Cold War and anti-communism, including the rupture of diplomatic relations with the Soviet Union. Between 15 August and 2 September 1947, the Inter-American Conference for the Maintenance of Peace and Security of the Continent was held, which was attended by US President Harry Truman and approved the Inter-American Treaty of Reciprocal Assistance (TIAR), commonly known as the Treaty of Rio de Janeiro. It established that "an armed attack by any country against an American state shall be considered an attack against all American states."

In May 1949, Dutra made a 10-day visit to the United States, becoming the first Brazilian president to do so, but the results were rather modest.

== Cabinet ==
Overall, the ministers were linked to Vargas, but from May 1946, when the UDN held a national convention, Dutra definitely oriented his policy towards a conservative alliance. The exception was João Neves, who left his post in July and was replaced on an interim basis by Samuel Gracie. Edmundo de Macedo Soares also left the ministry, only to be elected governor of the state in 1947. Neto Campelo contributed to the division of the PSD in Pernambuco with his anti-Vargas orientation, as did Carlos Luz in Minas Gerais.

Ministry	MInister	Party	Period
Chief of Staff of the Presidency	Gabriel Monteiro da Silva		1946
Chief of Staff of the Presidency	José Pereira Lira		1946–1951
Aeronautics	Armando Figueira Trompowsky		1946–1951
Agriculture	Neto Campelo		1946
Agriculture	Daniel Serapião de Carvalho	Republican Party	1946–1950
Agriculture	Antônio Novais Filho	Social Democratic Party	1950–1951
Education and Public Health	Ernesto de Sousa Campos		1946
Education and Public Health	Clemente Mariani	Social Democratic Party	1946–1950
Education and Public Health	Eduardo Rios Filho (temporary)		1950
Education and Public Health	Pedro Calmon		1950–1951
Finance	Gastão Vidigal		1946
Finance	Onaldo Brancante Machado (temporary)		1946
Finance	Pedro Luís Correia e Castro		1946–1949
Finance	Manuel Guilherme da Silveira Filho		1949–1951
Army	Pedro Aurélio de Góis Monteiro	Social Democratic Party	1946
Army	Canrobert Pereira da Costa	Social Democratic Party	1946–1951
Justice and Public Security	Carlos Luz		1946
Justice and Public Security	Benedito Costa Neto		1946–1947
Justice and Public Security	Adroaldo Costa	Social Democratic Party	1947–1950
Justice and Public Security	Honório Fernandes Monteiro (temporary)		1950
Justice and Public Security	Adroaldo Tourinho Junqueira Alves (temporary)		1950
Justice and Public Security	José Francisco Bias Fortes	Social Democratic Party	1950–1951
Navy	Jorge Dodsworth Martins		1946
Navy	Silvio de Noronha		1946–1951
Foreign Affairs	João Neves da Fontoura		1946
Foreign Affairs	Samuel de Sousa Leão Gracie (temporary)		1946
Foreign Affairs	Raul Fernandes		1946–1951
Labour and Employment	Otacílio Negrão de Lima	National Labour Party	1946
Labour and Employment	Morvan Dias de Figueiredo		1946–1948
Labour and Employment	João Otaviano de Lima Pereira		1948
Labour and Employment	Honório Fernandes Monteiro	Social Democratic Party	1948–1950
Labour and Employment	Marcial Dias Pequeno		1950–1951
Transport and Public Works	Edmundo de Macedo Soares e Silva		1946
Transport and Public Works	Luis Augusto da Silva Vieira (temporary)	Social Democratic Party	1946
Transport and Public Works	Clóvis Pestana	Social Democratic Party	1946–1950
Transport and Public Works	João Valdetaro do Amorim e Melo		1950–1951

== See also ==
- Fourth Brazilian Republic
