= 1950 Brazilian general election =

- 3 October 1950
- President
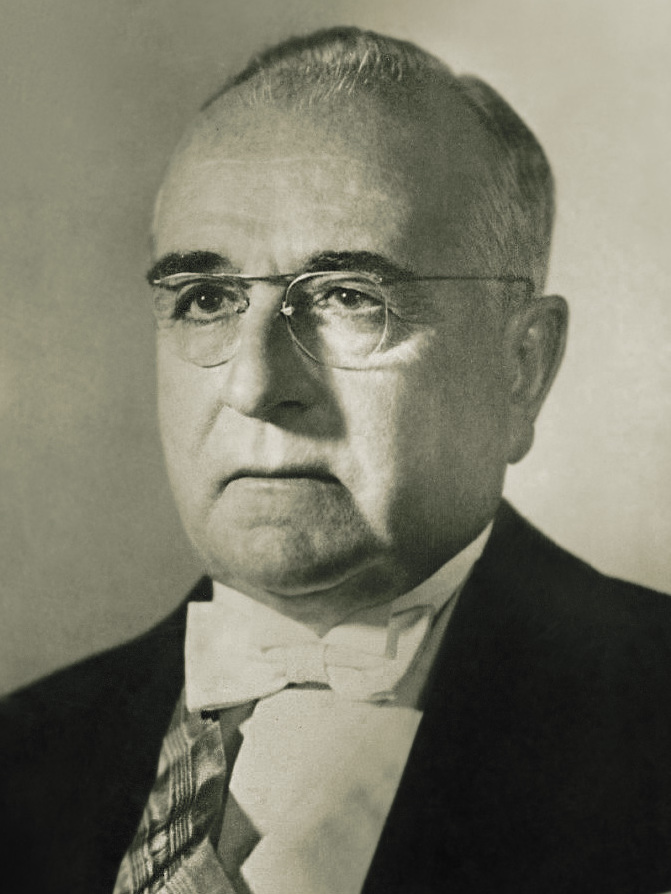

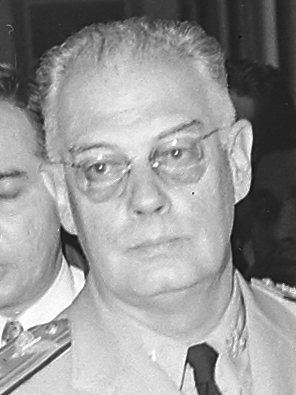

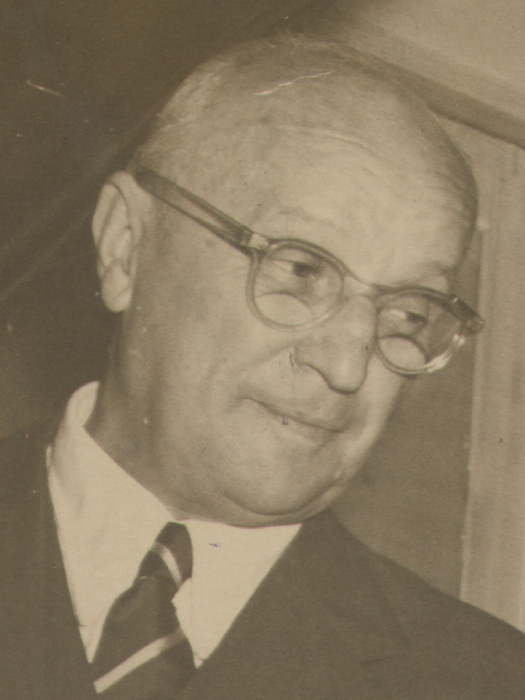
Candidate	Getúlio Vargas	Eduardo Gomes	Cristiano Machado
Party	PTB	UDN	PSD
Popular vote	3,849,040	2,342,384	1,697,193
Percentage	48.73%	29.66%	21.49%
- Results by state
President before election
Eurico Gaspar Dutra
PSD
President-elect
Getúlio Vargas
PTB
- Vice president
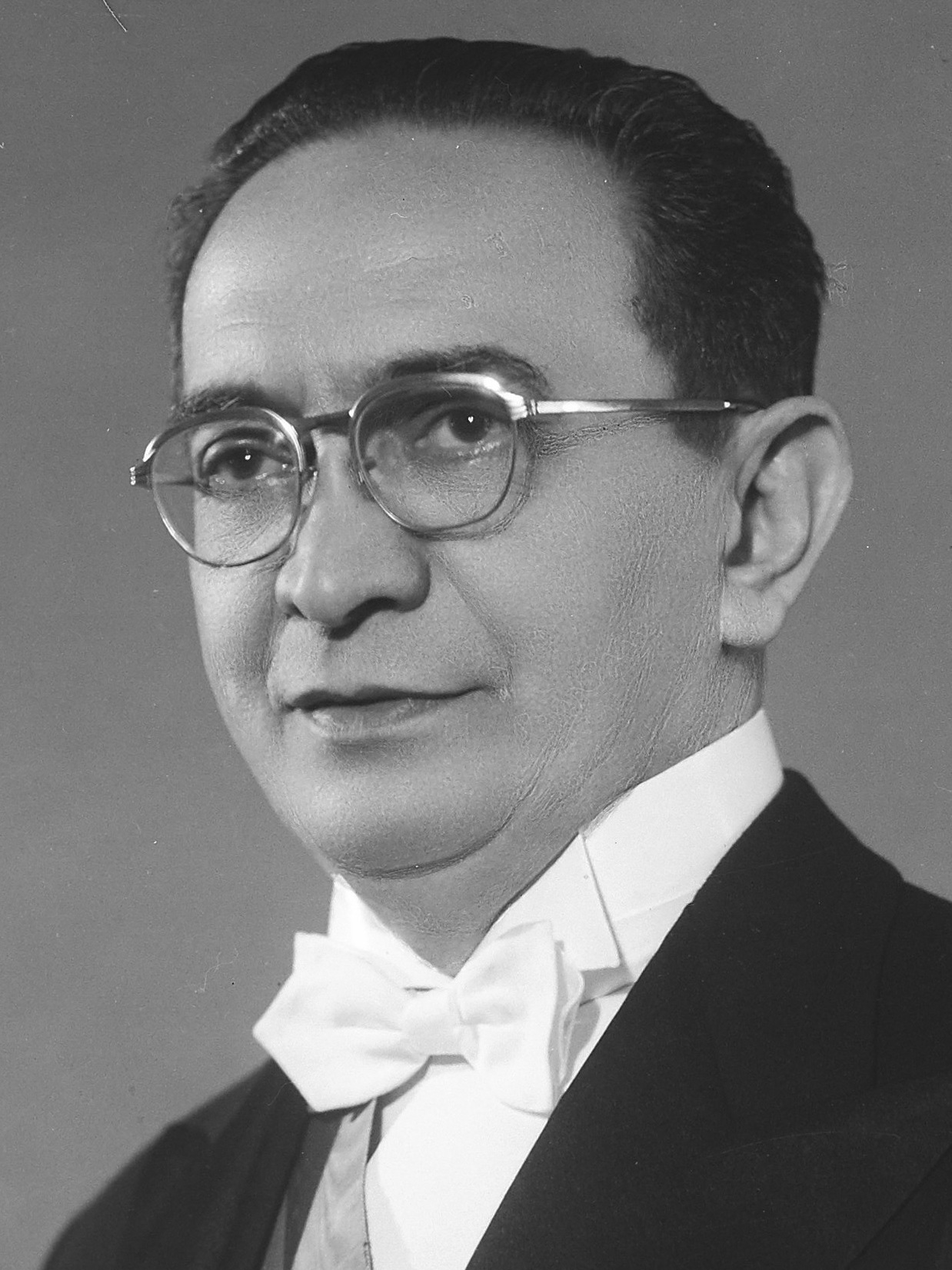

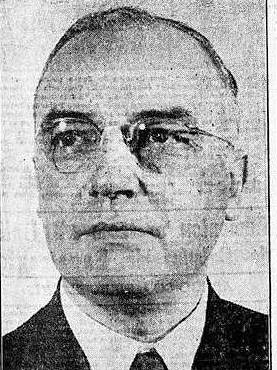

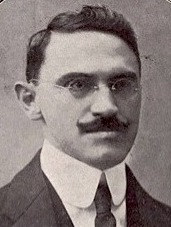
Candidate	Café Filho	Odilon Braga	Altino Marques
Party	PSP	UDN	PR
Popular vote	2,520,790	2,344,841	1,649,309
Percentage	35.76%	33.26%	23.4%
Vice President before election
Nereu Ramos
PSD
President-elect
Café Filho
PSP
- Chamber of Deputies
- All 304 seats in the Chamber of Deputies
Party	Leader	Vote %	Seats	+/–
PSD	Nereu Ramos	26.99	112	−39
UDN	Prado Kelly	16.99	81	0
PTB	Getúlio Vargas	16.47	51	+29
PSP	Adhemar de Barros	7.29	24	New
PR	Artur Bernardes	2.82	11	+2
PTN		2.75	5	New
PST		2.13	9	New
PRT		0.96	1	New
PRP	Plínio Salgado	0.94	2	0
PDC		0.74	2	0
PL		0.72	5	+4
PSB		0.48	1	New
This lists parties that won seats. See the complete results below.
- Federal Senate
- 22 seats in the Federal Senate
Party	Leader	Vote %	Seats	+/–
PSD	Nereu Ramos	15.45	6	−19
PTB	Otávio Mangabeira	10.45	5	+2
UDN	Prado Kelly	9.62	4	−8
PR	Artur Bernardes	7.27	2	+2
PSP	Adhemar de Barros	6.72	3	+3
PST		1.62	1	New
PSB		0.20	1	New
This lists parties that won seats. See the complete results below.

General elections were held in Brazil on 3 October 1950. The presidential elections were won by Getúlio Vargas of the Brazilian Labour Party, whilst the Social Democratic Party remained the largest party in both the Chamber of Deputies and the Senate, although they lost their majority in the former. Voter turnout was 72% in the presidential and Chamber elections and 78% in the Senate elections.

== Background ==
After living in self-imposed exile in his Riograndense ranch between his overthrow in 1945 and 1950, former President Getúlio Vargas, who had already been elected a senator in 1945, decided to run for the presidency, as the candidate of the Brazilian Labor Party (PTB), one of the two he founded before he was deposed in October 1945, putting an end to his 15-year dictatorship. Vargas, although in exile, remained active on the sidelines of Brazilian politics during the presidency of his former War Minister, Eurico Gaspar Dutra. He notably criticized his successor's economic policies, taking a hard nationalist and populist tone which appealed to the base of the PTB, organized labour.

In April 1950, the Social Democratic Party, also pro-Vargas but based more around industrialists and state political machines, rejected the idea of forming a coalition with the PTB or the UDN and decided to run its own candidate. They nominated Cristiano Machado, a little-known congressman for Minas Gerais.

However, Vargas was able to forge an alliance with a number of PSD state leaders, notably in his own state of Rio Grande do Sul and in Rio de Janeiro. In Pernambuco, he even forged an alliance with his traditional rivals, the UDN. This phenomenon - to nominate a candidate and support another - became known as "Cristianization" in Brazil after it came at the expense of Cristiano Machado. In the state of São Paulo, he forged an alliance with Adhemar de Barros' Social Progressive Party (PSP), a populist electoral machine which dominated state politics. The PSP was the only other party to officially endorse him, and provided him with his running-mate (who was separately elected), João Café Filho. Vargas also assured himself of the support, or at least approval, of the military which had deposed him in 1945. He reconciled himself with the dominant figure of the military then, Góis Monteiro, who had played a role in his 1945 overthrow.

The center-right National Democratic Union (UDN), noted for its radical anti-Vargas posture, once again nominated Eduardo Gomes as its candidate. The party proved woefully unable to expand its narrow electoral base, and not even the anti-Vargas rhetoric of 1945 could deliver more votes. The UDN and Gomes also proved their little comprehension of the evolving Brazilian political scene by supporting abolishing the minimum wage instituted in Vargas' past administration.

During the Eurico Gaspar Dutra administration, the Brazilian Communist Party had its license revoked by the Superior Electoral Court in the context of the early Cold War. Communists oriented their followers not to vote, but a significant share of them voted on Vargas.

== Presidential candidates ==
- Former President Getúlio Vargas of Rio Grande do Sul (PTB)
- Former Air Minister Eduardo Gomes of Rio de Janeiro (UDN)
- Congressman Cristiano Machado of Minas Gerais (PSD)
- João Mangabeira (PSB)

== Results ==
=== President ===
Vargas won a convincing victory, with 48.7% of the vote and close to an absolute majority of votes cast. Despite the UDN's claim that he was not constitutionally elected (they claimed that a candidate needed an absolute majority of the votes), Vargas was inaugurated President on 31 January 1951.

As of 2023, this remains the last time that the bellwether state of Minas Gerais did not vote for the winner of the election.

Candidate	Party	Votes	%
Getúlio Vargas	Brazilian Labour Party	3,849,040	48.73
Eduardo Gomes	National Democratic Union	2,342,384	29.66
Cristiano Machado	Social Democratic Party	1,697,193	21.49
João Mangabeira	Brazilian Socialist Party	9,466	0.12
Total		7,898,083	100.00
Valid votes		7,898,083	95.68
Invalid/blank votes		356,906	4.32
Total votes		8,254,989	100.00
Registered voters/turnout		11,455,149	72.06
Source: Nohlen

=== Vice president ===
Candidate	Party	Votes	%
Café Filho	PSP–PTB	2,520,790	35.76
Odilon Braga	National Democratic Union	2,344,841	33.26
Altino Arantes Marques	Republican Party	1,649,309	23.40
Vitorino Freire	Social Labour Party	524,079	7.43
Alípio Correia Neto	Brazilian Socialist Party	10,800	0.15
Total		7,049,819	100.00
Valid votes		7,049,819	85.40
Invalid/blank votes		1,205,170	14.60
Total votes		8,254,989	100.00
Registered voters/turnout		11,455,149	72.06
Source: DM

=== Chamber of Deputies ===
Party	Votes	%	Seats
Social Democratic Party	2,068,405	26.99	112
National Democratic Union	1,301,489	16.99	81
Brazilian Labour Party	1,262,000	16.47	51
Social Progressive Party	558,792	7.29	24
PSD–PRP–PST	245,543	3.20	–
UDN–PR–PSP–PDC–PSB	240,537	3.14	–
Republican Party	216,207	2.82	11
National Labor Party	211,090	2.75	5
UDN–PR–PRP–PDC–PTB–PL	176,432	2.30	–
Social Labour Party	163,341	2.13	9
PSD–PL	144,024	1.88	–
UDN–PST	103,368	1.35	–
UDN–PR	110,733	1.45	–
PSD–PR–PSP	94,630	1.24	–
UDN–PSP–PL–PST	86,326	1.13	–
PTB–PSP	84,467	1.10	–
UDN–PR–PST–PRP–PL	83,530	1.09	–
Labour Republican Party	73,501	0.96	1
Popular Representation Party	72,397	0.94	2
UDN–PSD–PR–PL–PSP–PTB	67,983	0.89	–
Christian Democratic Party	56,965	0.74	2
Liberator Party	55,338	0.72	5
Brazilian Socialist Party	36,638	0.48	1
Others	148,477	1.94	0
Total	7,662,213	100.00	304
Valid votes	7,662,213	92.98	
Invalid/blank votes	578,783	7.02	
Total votes	8,240,996	100.00	
Registered voters/turnout	11,445,149	72.00	
Source: Nohlen

=== Senate ===
Party	Votes	%	Seats
Social Democratic Party	1,204,349	15.45	6
Brazilian Labour Party	814,796	10.45	5
National Democratic Union	749,989	9.62	4
Republican Party	566,520	7.27	2
Social Progressive Party	524,261	6.72	3
Popular Representation Party	244,769	3.14	0
Social Labour Party	126,437	1.62	1
Liberator Party	88,614	1.14	0
Orienting Labour Party	56,180	0.72	0
Labour Republican Party	46,325	0.59	0
Brazilian Socialist Party	15,458	0.20	1
Others	3,358,438	43.08	0
Total	7,796,136	100.00	22
Valid votes	7,796,136	87.79	
Invalid/blank votes	1,084,313	12.21	
Total votes	8,880,449	100.00	
Registered voters/turnout	11,427,441	77.71	
Source: Nohlen
