= 1945 Brazilian coup d'état =

Army coup against President Vargas

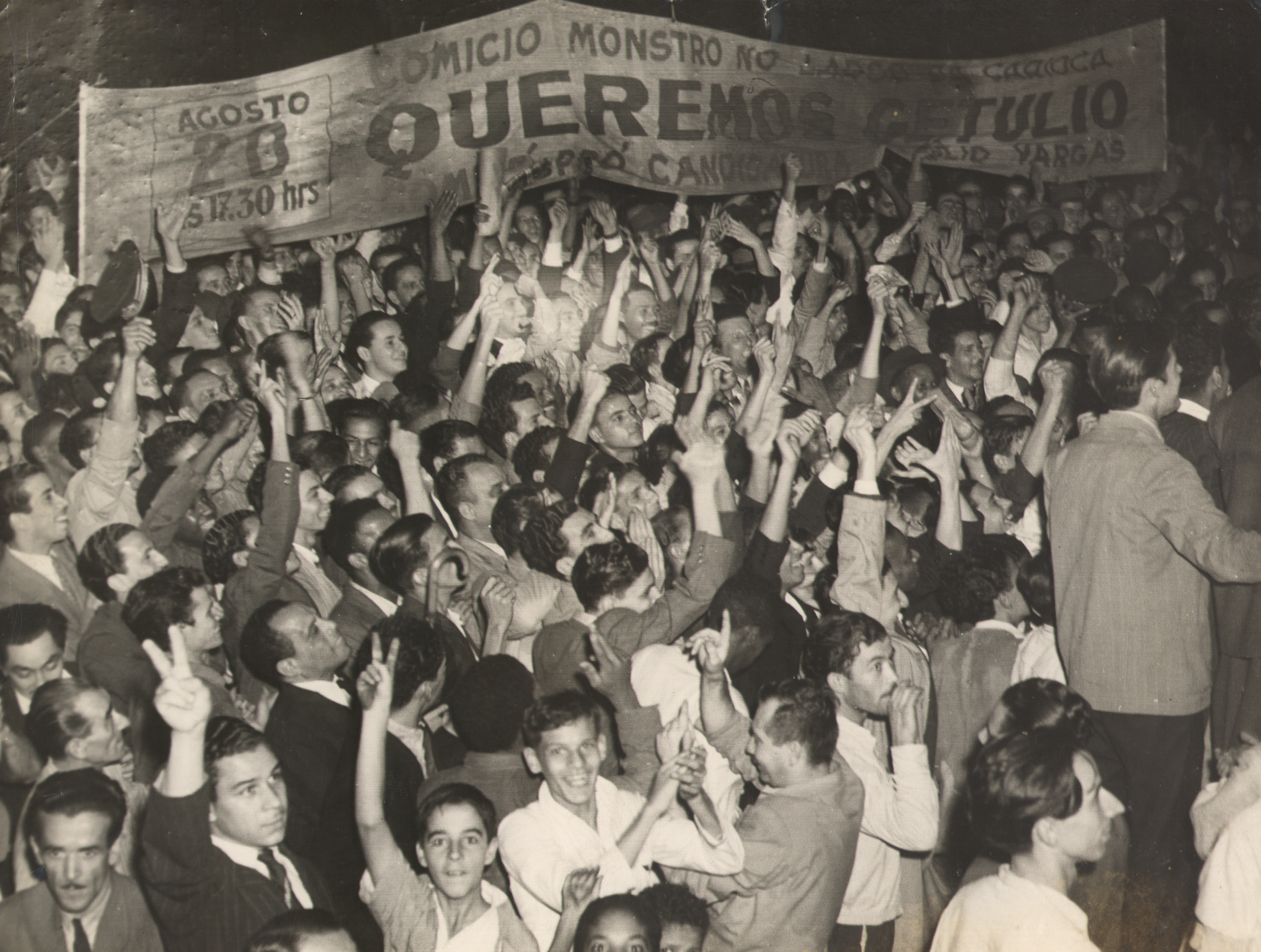
- Demonstration in favor of Getúlio Vargas at the end of the Estado Novo, August 1945
Date	29 October 1945; 80 years ago
Location	Brazil
Result	Coup successful: Estado Novo dictatorship deposed; President of the Supreme Federal Court, José Linhares, inaugurated as interim President of Brazil; First free elections since 1934 held on 2 December; Start of the Fourth Brazilian Republic

Belligerents
Government of Brazil	Brazilian Army

Commanders and leaders
Getúlio Vargas	Eurico Gaspar Dutra; Góis Monteiro

The 1945 Brazilian coup d'état was a coup d'état in Brazil led by the Brazilian Army, prompted by concerns that President Getúlio Vargas intended to seize absolute power. Vargas was forced to resign on 29 October 1945.

The 1945 Brazilian general election was held on 2 December 1945, where former Minister of War Eurico Gaspar Dutra was elected president. A new democratic constitution was adopted on 18 September 1946, thus beginning the Fourth Brazilian Republic.

== Background ==
Though abroad the government defended democracy, domestic discontent increased when World War II came to an end, due to the authoritarian policies of Getúlio Vargas and his government. Growing political movements and democratic demonstrations forced Vargas to abolish censorship in 1945, release numerous political prisoners, and allow for the re-formation of political parties such as the Brazilian Communist Party, which supported Vargas after receiving direct instructions from the Soviet Union. In 1943, university students began to mobilize against Vargas. Strikes, which were banned, began to re-emerge thanks to war-related inflation, and even Minister of Foreign Affairs Oswaldo Aranha was in favor of a democratic shift. In 1945, Vargas received support from the newly established Brazilian Labour Party as well as segments of the left.

== Coup ==
Vargas added the Additional Act to the constitution, which, among other things, provided for a 90-day period during which a time and date for elections would be designated. The new electoral code was issued precisely ninety days afterward; it established 2 December 1945 for the election of the president, and 6 May 1946 for (new) constituent assembly and state elections. Furthermore, Vargas promulgated his intention not to run for president. The military feared that Vargas was about to seize absolute power (after a detrimental move on 25 October 1945, removing João Alberto from chief of police of the Federal District and replacing him with Vargas's brother Benjamin), so they forced his resignation and deposed him on 29 October, ending his first presidency.

== Bibliography ==
- Fausto, Boris; Fausto, Sérgio (2014). A Concise History of Brazil (2º, revised ed.). São Paulo, Brazil: Cambridge University Press. ISBN 978-1-10763-524-1.
- Meade, Teresa (2010). A Brief History of Brazil (2º ed.). New York: Facts On File. ISBN 978-0-81607-788-5.
