= Orienting Labour Party =

Orienting Labour Party Partido Orientador Trabalhista
- Leader: Waldemar Pinto Peixoto
- Founded: 16 June 1945
- Dissolved: 12 October 1951
- Headquarters: Rio de Janeiro, RJ
- Ideology: Labourism
- Political position: Right-wing

The Orienting Labour Party (Portuguese: Partido Orientador Trabalhista, POT) was a political party in Brazil. It supported Cristiano Machado to the presidency of Brazil in the 1950 general elections. Owing to unimpressive results, its registration was revoked by the Superior Electoral Court in 1951.

== Election results ==
=== Presidential elections ===
Election	Candidate	Running mate	Colligation	First round		Second round		Result
Election	Candidate	Running mate	Colligation	Votes	%	Votes	%	Result
1950	Cristiano Machado (PSD)	None	PSD; PR; POT; PST	1.697.173	21,49% (#3)	-	-	Lost ✗
1950	None	Altino Arantes (PSD)	PSD; PR; POT	1.649.309	23,40% (#3)	-	-	Lost ✗

=== Parliamentary elections ===
Election	Chamber of Deputies				Senate				Notes
Election	Votes	%	Seats	+/-	Votes	%	Seats	+/-	Notes
1950	19.384	0,25%	0 / 304	Steady	19.479	0,24%	0 / 22	Steady	
