= Altino Arantes =

Brazilian politician (1876–1965)

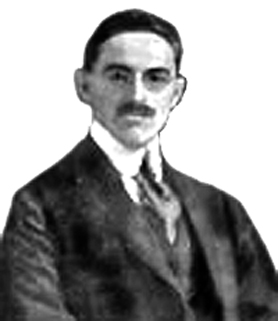

Personal details
- Born: 29 September 1876 Batatais, Brazil
- Died: 5 July 1965 (aged 88) São Paulo, Brazil

Altino Arantes Marques (1876–1965) was a President of São Paulo. He was born in Batatais and graduated from the Law School of São Paulo in 1895. He was a member of the Republican Party of São Paulo. Before he became the president of the state of São Paulo, he was a federal deputy for two terms: (1906–1908) and (1909–1911). He was also secretary of state of the interior from 1911 to 1915.

== Presidency ==
During his administration, the second artificial valorisation (price-setting) of coffee was promoted (the first was in 1906, by the Tabuaté Agreement). With the frost of 1918, this product, doubled in price in the Santos' Port, giving the Altino Arantes government much revenue. With reduced production, it was possible to put the price premium into the world market, allowing the government to take control of the Sorocabana Railroad from a North-American group.

== After the presidency ==
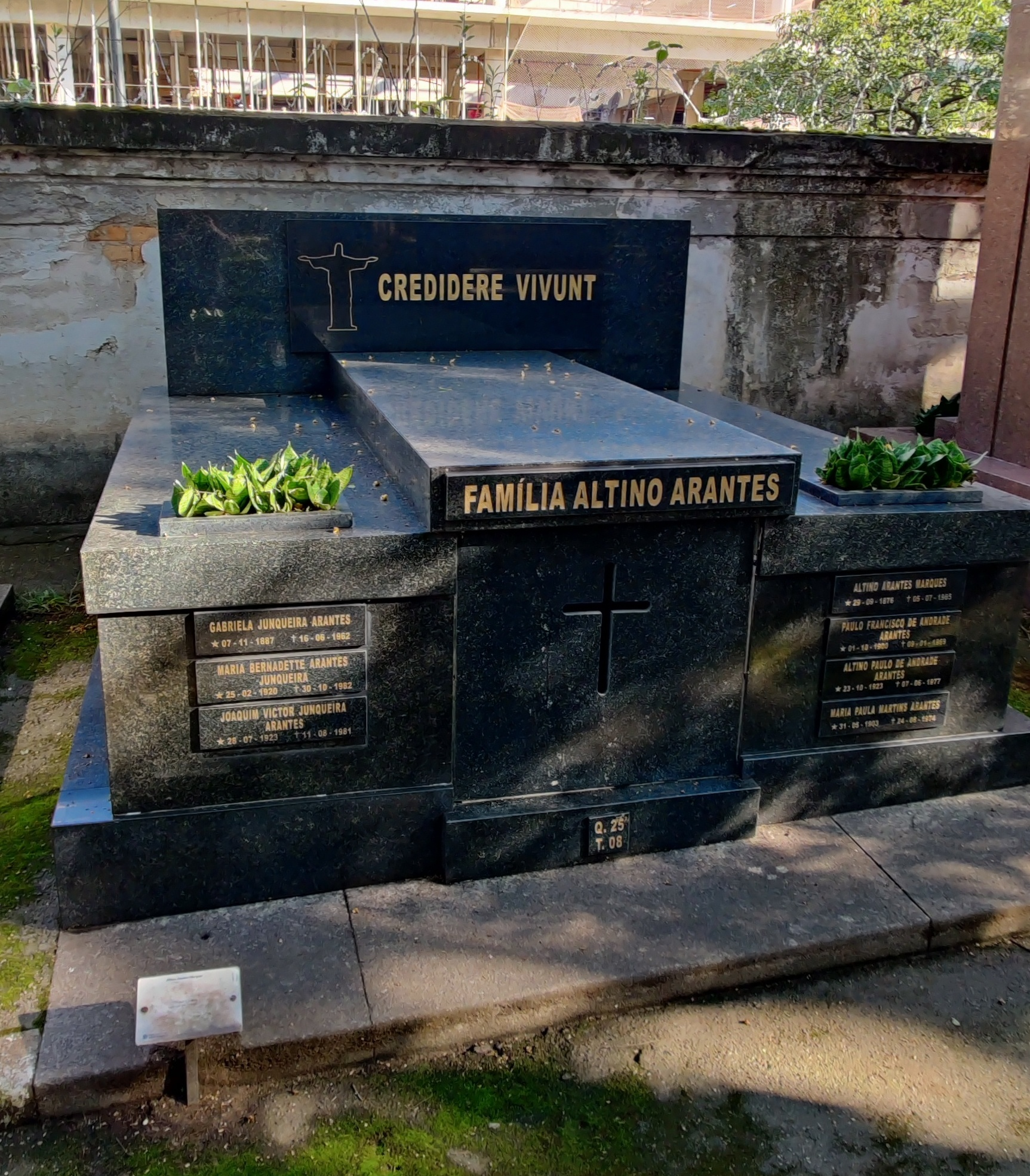
Family tomb of Altino Arantes at Cemitério da Consolação in São Paulo (2022)

Between 1921 and 1930 Altino Arantes was a federal deputy again. In 1947 he was a constituent deputy and, again, a federal deputy. He was a member of the Republican Party, and ran for vice president with Cristiano Machado in the 1950 Brazilian presidential election, coming third with 24.4% of the vote. He was the first President of the Banespa, became a member and President of the Paulist Academy of Words and member of the Historic and Geographic Institution of São Paulo. He died in São Paulo in 1965.

== Legacy ==
Outside São Paulo Arantes is largely unknown, although his administration was amongst the more successful of the Brazilian Old Republic.

Government offices
Preceded by Rodrigues Alves	President of the State of São Paulo; 1916–1920	Succeeded by Washington Luís
