= 1945 Brazilian general election =

- 2 December 1945
- Presidential election
- Turnout: 82.13%
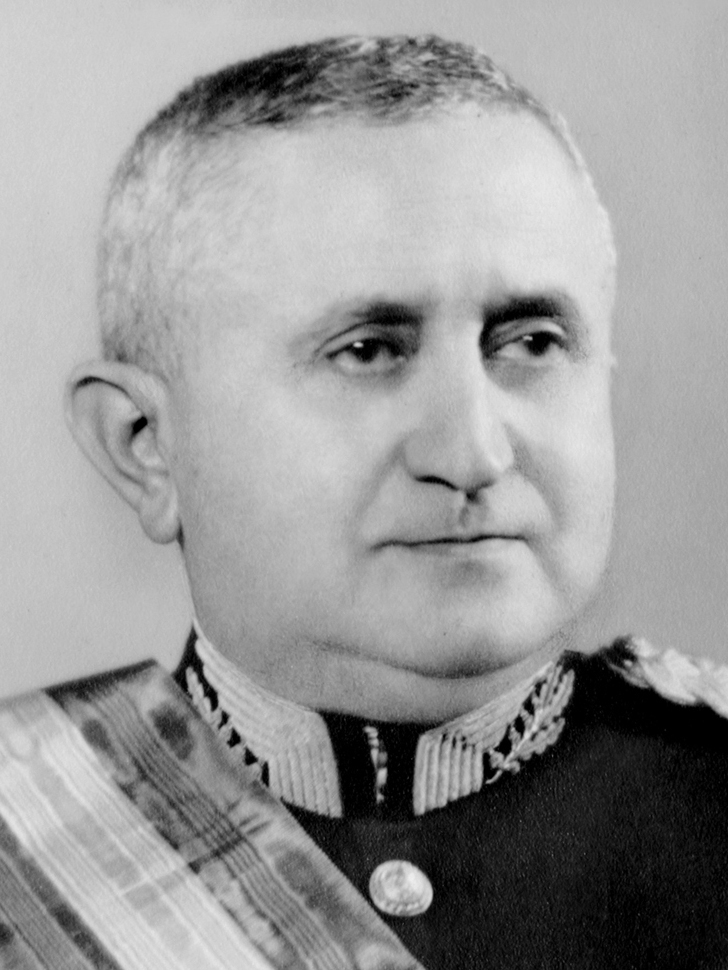

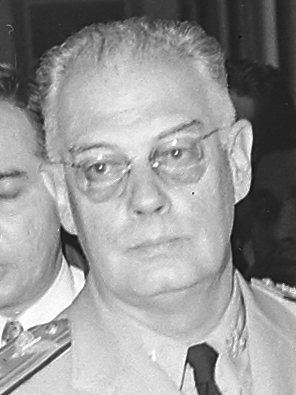

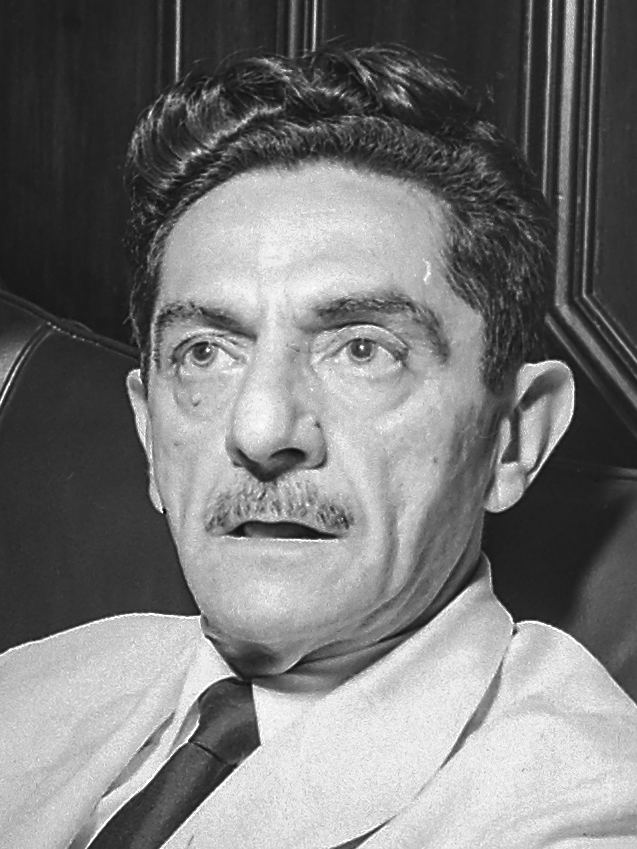
| Candidate | Eurico Dutra | Eduardo Gomes | Yedo Fiúza |
| Party | PSD | UDN | PCB |
| Popular vote | 3,251,507 | 2,039,341 | 569,818 |
| Percentage | 55.39% | 34.74% | 9.71% |
- Results by state
President before election
José Linhares
Independent
President-elect
Eurico Gaspar Dutra
PSD
- Chamber of Deputies
- All 286 seats in the Chamber of Deputies
| Party | Leader | Vote % | Seats |
|---|---|---|---|
| PSD | Nereu Ramos | 42.74 | 151 |
| UDN | Otávio Mangabeira | 26.59 | 81 |
| PTB | | 10.19 | 22 |
| PCB | Luís Carlos Prestes | 8.63 | 14 |
| PR | Artur Bernardes | 3.71 | 9 |
| PPS | Miguel Reale | 1.81 | 4 |
| PDC | | 1.72 | 2 |
| PRP | Plínio Salgado | 1.59 | 2 |
| PL | | 0.97 | 1 |
This lists parties that won seats. See the complete results below.
- Senate
- All 42 seats in the Senate
| Party | Leader | Vote % | Seats |
|---|---|---|---|
| PSD | Nereu Ramos | 38.03 | 25 |
| UDN | Otávio Mangabeira | 24.30 | 12 |
| PCB | Luís Carlos Prestes | 9.86 | 1 |
| PTB | | 9.76 | 3 |
| PPS | Miguel Reale | 1.58 | 1 |
This lists parties that won seats. See the complete results below.

General elections were held in Brazil on 2 December 1945, the first since the establishment of Getúlio Vargas' Estado Novo. The presidential elections were won by Eurico Gaspar Dutra of the Social Democratic Party (PSD), whilst the PSD also won a majority of seats in both the Chamber of Deputies and the Senate. Voter turnout was 83% in the presidential election, 81% in the Chamber elections and 73% in the Senate elections.

== Background ==
Following the end of World War II, Vargas was forced by the military to re-democratize the country. However, the military feared that Vargas would suspend the elections like he had suspended the scheduled 1938 elections in 1937 and staged a preventative coup which prematurely removed Vargas from power on 29 October 1945 and installed a caretaker government led by José Linhares to ensure the free and fair carry-out of the elections.

During this era of liberalization, Vargas founded two parties: the Social Democratic Party (PSD), a centre-right party composed primarily of the national industrial bourgeoisie which had supported Vargas and his interventors in the states, and the Brazilian Labour Party (PTB) composed of the urban working class and trade union movement. The PSD would become the largest party of the two, although Vargas used the PTB as his personal machine. The PSD consistently had the largest number of deputies until the 1964 military coup. The Varguista coalition had nominated Vargas' War Minister Eurico Gaspar Dutra earlier in 1945, but the PTB and Vargas offered Dutra's fledgling candidacy only lukewarm support.

Vargas' traditional opponents had founded the National Democratic Union (UDN) in April 1945. The UDN, a conservative party defending economic liberalism through public incentive to foreign capital, was mostly a party of intellectuals and the urban middle-class, as well as the remnants of the oligarchic interests of the República Velha. It nominated the former tenente and Air Force brigadier Eduardo Gomes, later known for participating in the 1964 coup, as its presidential candidate. Gomes notably advocated repealing a majority of the social legislation and labour reforms passed during the Vargas rule.

The recently legalized Brazilian Communist Party elected 14 deputies, and the party's popular leader, Luís Carlos Prestes was elected to the Senate in Guanabara. Getúlio Vargas, nominated by the PSD and his Brazilian Labour Party (PTB) in various states including Rio Grande do Sul was elected to the Senate representing Rio Grande do Sul and São Paulo as well as elected to the Chamber in six states and Rio de Janeiro. He opted to accept the Senate seat he won for the PSD (although he supported the PTB) in Rio Grande do Sul. Former President Artur Bernardes standing for election to the Senate in Minas Gerais for the Republican Party was defeated, placing third with 21.4% of the vote.

== Results ==
=== President ===
| Candidate | Party | Votes | % |
|---|---|---|---|
| Eurico Gaspar Dutra | Social Democratic Party | 3,251,507 | 55.39 |
| Eduardo Gomes | National Democratic Union | 2,039,341 | 34.74 |
| Yedo Fiúza | Brazilian Communist Party | 569,818 | 9.71 |
| Mário Rolim Teles | National Agrarian Party | 10,001 | 0.17 |
| Total | | 5,870,667 | 100.00 |
| Valid votes | | 5,870,667 | 94.68 |
| Invalid/blank votes | | 330,138 | 5.32 |
| Total votes | | 6,200,805 | 100.00 |
| Registered voters/turnout | | 7,549,849 | 82.13 |
Source: Nohlen

=== Chamber of Deputies ===
| Party | Votes | % | Seats |
|---|---|---|---|
| Social Democratic Party | 2,531,944 | 42.74 | 151 |
| National Democratic Union | 1,575,375 | 26.59 | 81 |
| Brazilian Labour Party | 603,500 | 10.19 | 22 |
| Brazilian Communist Party | 511,302 | 8.63 | 14 |
| Republican Party | 219,562 | 3.71 | 9 |
| Syndicalist Popular Party | 107,321 | 1.81 | 4 |
| Christian Democratic Party | 101,636 | 1.72 | 2 |
| Popular Representation Party | 94,447 | 1.59 | 2 |
| Progressive Renewal Party | 70,675 | 1.19 | 0 |
| Liberator Party | 57,341 | 0.97 | 1 |
| Democratic Republican Party | 33,647 | 0.57 | 0 |
| National Agrarian Party | 17,866 | 0.30 | 0 |
| Total | 5,924,616 | 100.00 | 286 |
| Valid votes | 5,924,616 | 96.76 | |
| Invalid/blank votes | 198,248 | 3.24 | |
| Total votes | 6,122,864 | 100.00 | |
| Registered voters/turnout | 7,499,670 | 81.64 | |
Source: Nohlen

=== Senate ===
In the Senate elections each voter had two votes.

| Party | Votes | % | Seats |
|---|---|---|---|
| Social Democratic Party | 4,225,389 | 38.03 | 25 |
| National Democratic Union | 2,699,493 | 24.30 | 12 |
| Brazilian Communist Party | 1,095,834 | 9.86 | 1 |
| Brazilian Labour Party | 1,084,553 | 9.76 | 3 |
| Republican Party | 443,654 | 3.99 | 0 |
| Syndicalist Popular Party | 175,452 | 1.58 | 1 |
| Progressive Renewal Party | 60,820 | 0.55 | 0 |
| Democratic Republican Party | 11,125 | 0.10 | 0 |
| Liberator Party | 7,326 | 0.07 | 0 |
| Social Progressive Party | 3,584 | 0.03 | 0 |
| National Agrarian Party | 3,533 | 0.03 | 0 |
| Coalitions | 583,207 | 5.25 | 0 |
| Independents | 716,715 | 6.45 | 0 |
| Total | 11,110,685 | 100.00 | 42 |
| Valid votes | 5,130,965 | 94.60 | |
| Invalid/blank votes | 293,097 | 5.40 | |
| Total votes | 5,424,062 | 100.00 | |
| Registered voters/turnout | 7,418,930 | 73.11 | |
Source: Nohlen (votes)
