= Gambling in Brazil =

Gambling in Brazil has several legal restrictions. Casinos have been considered illegal in Brazil and considered a criminal misdemeanour since 1946, by a decree signed by President Eurico Gaspar Dutra, who would have been influenced by his wife Carmela Teles Dutra, who was known for her strong religiosity to Catholic Church. Horse betting and sports betting were legal in Brazil until President Luiz Inácio Lula da Silva near the presidential election proclaimed “Society was left completely unprotected,” and “The country brought the casino into people’s homes. It is in the kitchen, it is in the living room. There has to be oversight.”. Furthermore, the president signed an immediate measure on September 25, 2026, that prohibits all online betting, including sports betting and virtual casinos or any other advertisement. Since 1967, the state-owned bank Caixa Econômica Federal have the monopoly on the exploitation of lotteries in Brazil.

In 1993, commercial exploitation that offer bingo games and slot machines were legalized by the Zico Act, which provided for the commercial exploitation of bingo games to funding sports entities. In 1998, the Pelé Act revoked the Zico Act and created a special chapter regulating bingo exploitation. As of 2004, Provisional Measure 168, signed by President Luiz Inácio Lula da Silva, prohibited the commercial exploitation of bingos.

The debate on the legalization of gambling is controversial in Brazil and collides with ideological and religious issues. Since 1991, several bills proposing the legalization of gambling are being analyzed in the National Congress of Brazil. Parliamentarians in favor of the legalization of gambling in Brazil claim that gambling can increase the revenue to be generated by taxing the commercial exploitation of games of chance. Members of the National Congress opposed to the proposal, which include congressmen from the Evangelical Caucus, raise questions about the mental risks of gambling addiction and argue that exploitation of gambling can open the door to corruption and money laundering.

== Current situation of gambling in Brazil ==
Recently, Brazil has taken significant steps towards the regulation of online gambling and betting with the enactment of Law 14.790 on December 29, 2023. Known as the "Law of Bets," this legislation aims to bring transparency, security, and integrity to the online betting market, covering both sports betting and online casino games. The law introduces clear guidelines for payment methods, customer support, advertising, and measures to prevent money laundering and fraud.

In a significant crackdown on illegal online gambling in Brazil, approximately 2,000 unauthorized websites are set to be taken offline in October 2024. The Ministry of Finance has released an updated list of 205 sites linked to 93 companies authorized to operate nationwide, along with 22 sites with state licenses. Users of unauthorized platforms are advised to withdraw their funds by October 10, 2024. The government is implementing strict measures, including prohibiting credit card use for online betting and creating an inter-ministerial working group to address the issue. Concerns about money laundering and the impact on vulnerable populations, particularly Bolsa Família beneficiaries, have prompted investigations and discussions on potential regulatory changes. President Lula has characterized online sports betting debt as a "dependency issue," emphasizing the need for comprehensive action to protect citizens and regulate the industry effectively.

Brazil has considered the legalization of commercial casinos but have shelved those plans as of 2025.

In July 2026, Brazil's Finance Ministry announced that betting ads would soon have to start featuring "tobacco style" warnings and disclaimers. In an interview in July, ANJL President Plínio Lemos Jorge noted that Brazil's gambling sector jumped from "BRL3.1 billion ($620 million) between January and May 2025 to BRL5.89 billion" in 2026.

In September 2026, President Lula enacted Provisional Measure 1394, banning online casinos and effectively revoking Law 14.970.

In response to Provisional Measure No. 1,394/2026, signed by the President Luiz Inácio Lula da Silva in September 2026, the licensed betting sector organized a coordinate campaign. Social Media influencer posted a manifesto in the defense of the regulation of market under the hashtag #NósApostamosNoBrazil, the National Association of Games and Lotteries (ANJL) and the Brazilian Institute for Responsible Gaming (IBJR), with support from soccer stadiums released another round of manifesto title "Proibir não é proteger" meaning ("To prohibit is not to protect). During rounds of the Campeonate Brasileiro Série A, advertising boards in stadiums expressed the slogan with the messages such as "Não se muda a regra no meio do jogo" ("You don't change the rules in the middle of the game"). Some clubs also put the slogan on their jerseys. Flamengo wore it against Santos on October 8th in the chest held by its main sponsor Betano. Other famous teams in the Brazilian soccer league including São Paulo, Fluminense, Palmeiras, Corinthians and Santos published a joint manifesto titled "O fim do futebol brasileiro" ("The end of Brazilian football"), and after its publication 23 clubs inquired the Supreme Federal Court to suspend the ban.
