= José Linhares =

President of Brazil from 1945 to 1946

His Excellency José Linhares
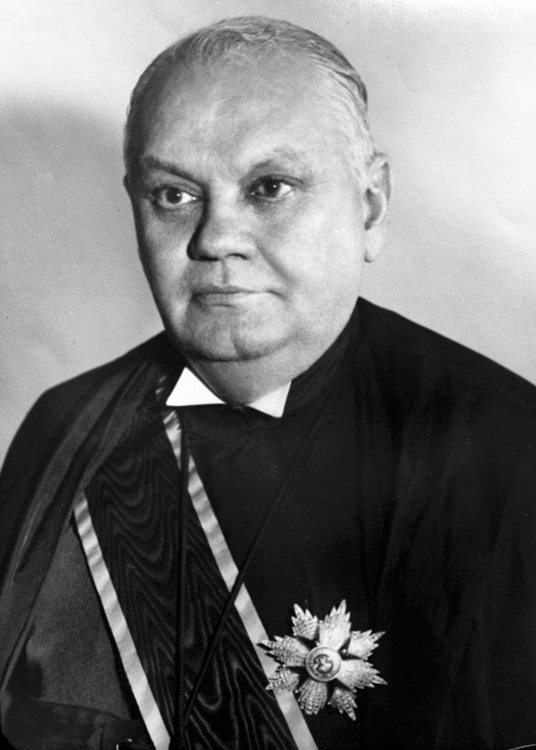

15th President of Brazil
- In office 29 October 1945 – 31 January 1946
- Vice President: Vacant
- Preceded by: Getúlio Vargas
- Succeeded by: Eurico Dutra
Judicial offices
President of the Supreme Federal Court
In office 2 May 1951 – 29 January 1956
Vice President	Orozimbo Nonato
Preceded by	Laudo de Camargo
Succeeded by	Orozimbo Nonato
In office 26 May 1945 – 31 January 1949
Vice President	Castro Nunes
Preceded by	Eduardo Espínola
Succeeded by	Laudo de Camargo
Justice of the Supreme Federal Court
In office 24 December 1937 – 29 January 1956
Appointed by	Getúlio Vargas
Preceded by	Ataulfo de Paiva
Succeeded by	Ary Franco

Personal details
- Born: José Alves Linhares; 28 January 1886 Baturité, Ceará, Brazil
- Died: 26 January 1957 (aged 70) Caxambu, Minas Gerais, Brazil
- Party: Independent
- Spouse: Luzia Cavalcanti (m. 1913) (1887-1969)
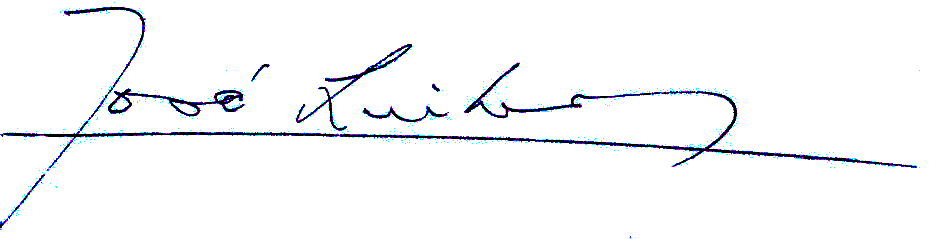
- Signature

José Linhares (Portuguese pronunciation: [ʒuˈzɛ ʎĩˈɲaɾis]; 28 January 1886 – 26 January 1957) was a Brazilian lawyer who briefly served as the interim president of Brazil in the final months of the Estado Novo. As President of the Supreme Federal Court, he was called by the Armed Forces to take over the Presidency following the ousting of Getúlio Vargas in 1945, to the inauguration of Eurico Gaspar Dutra, in 1946, which marked the beginning of what is known today as the Fourth Brazilian Republic.

Linhares was appointed Minister of the Supreme Federal Court in 1937, following the retirement of Ataúlfo Nápoles de Paiva, and served until his own retirement in 1956. He was twice President of the Supreme Federal Court, from 1945 to 1949, and from 1954 to 1956.

Linhares devoted himself mainly to prepare the return to democratic order, replacing the stakeholders in the states by judiciary members, giving the new parliament constitution-making powers, extinguishing the Court of National Security, abolishing the state of emergency, provided in the 1937 Constitution, among other measures. In the economic and administrative field, acted against inflation, revoked the antitrust law, one of the factors that led to the deposition of Vargas, and extinguished the Council of People's Economy. Granted autonomy to the University of Brazil and regulated various departments of the Ministry of Transportation and Public Works. In December 1945 elections were held for the presidency and the National Constituent Assembly. José Linhares remained in office until the inauguration of the elected president, Eurico Gaspar Dutra.

Political offices
Preceded by Getúlio Vargas	President of Brazil; 1945–1946	Succeeded by Eurico Gaspar Dutra
