= Prado Kelly =

Brazilian politician (1904–1986)

José Eduardo Prado Kelly

Minister of the Supreme Federal Court
- In office 16 November 1965 – 18 January 1968
- Appointed by: Humberto Castello Branco
- Preceded by: Position established by AI-2
- Succeeded by: Carlos Thompson Flores

Federal Deputy for Rio de Janeiro
- In office 1 February 1955 – 31 January 1959
- In office 1 February 1947 – 31 January 1951

Minister of Justice and Internal Affairs
- In office 18 April 1955 – 11 November 1955
- President: Café Filho
- Preceded by: Alexandre Marcondes Filho
- Succeeded by: Francisco de Menezes Pimentel

President of the National Democratic Union
- In office August 1948 – September 1950
- Preceded by: José Américo de Almeida
- Succeeded by: Odilon Braga

Personal details
- Born: 10 September 1904 Niterói, Rio de Janeiro, Brazil
- Died: 11 November 1986 (aged 82) Rio de Janeiro, Rio de Janeiro, Brazil
- Party: UPF; UDN
- Parent: Otávio Kelly (father)
- Education: Federal University of Rio de Janeiro Faculty of Law

José Eduardo do Prado Kelly (10 September 1904 – 11 November 1986) was a Brazilian jurist, lawyer, poet, journalist and politician. He was minister of the Supreme Federal Court, president of the Order of Attorneys of Brazil (OAB), minister of Justice and Interior Affairs, federal deputy for Rio de Janeiro and president of the National Democratic Union (UDN).

His father, Otávio Kelly, was also minister of the Supreme Federal Court.
