= Republican Party (Brazil) =

Brazilian political party (1945–1965)

Republican Party Partido Republicano
- Leader: Artur Bernardes
- Founded: 14 August 1945
- Dissolved: 27 October 1965 (Note: All parties were dissolved by the military regime on this date.)
- Merged into: National Renewal Alliance
- Headquarters: Rio de Janeiro, RJ
- Ideology: Federalism; Republicanism; Nationalism
- Political position: Center-right
- Colours: Green
- TSE number: 41

The Republican Party (Portuguese: Partido Republicano, PR) was a political party in Brazil. The PR was founded by former president of Brazil Artur Bernardes in 1945 and operated almost solely in Minas Gerais. It succeeded the old, local republican parties in the states of Minas Gerais, São Paulo, Maranhão, Pernambuco, and Paraná. The party was shut down in 1965, when all political parties were abolished by the military dictatorship.

== History ==
The party was founded by Artur Bernardes, former president of Brazil and member of the Republican Party in Minas Gerais, which was banned by the Estado Novo in 1937. The party reformed in 1945, with the new Electoral Code in Brazil, which required parties to operate at the national level only. Having been temporary members of the Nacional Democratic Union (UDN), the members of the old republican parties in Brazil announced their withdrawal from the UDN on August 14, 1945. The new Republican Party gathered members of the old local Republican parties of São Paulo, Minas Gerais, Maranhão, Pernambuco and Paraná. In the 1945 presidential election, it supported Eduardo Gomes of the UDN. In the 1945 legislative elections, the party won seven mandates to the Constituent Assembly, six from Minas Gerais and one from Maranhão.

During the government of President Eurico Gaspar Dutra, it supported Dutra. During the 1950 presidential election, some branches of the party backed UDN candidate Gomes, but the party's wing in Minas Gerais supported the Social Democratic Party (PSD) candidate, Cristiano Machado; both were defeated by Getúlio Vargas. In the legislative elections in that same year, the party won 11 seats, most of them from Minas Gerais.

In the 1954 general elections, the party made gains, achieving 19 mandates, mostly from Minas Gerais. In the 1955 presidential election, the party joined with the PSD to support the successful candidacy of Juscelino Kubitschek. For a while the party joined a coalition with PSD and the Brazilian Labor Party (PTB), until the coalition was dissolved in 1958, because the Republican Party supported the UDN candidate, Jânio Quadros, for the 1960 presidential election, instead of the PSD-PTB presidential candidate. The party's Minas Gerais wing, led by Clóvis Salgado, Tristão da Cunha and João Belo, backed Quadros' opponent. The PR was banned by the Brazilian military dictatorship, through AI-2 (Institutional Act Number Two) on October 27, 1965.

== Political positions ==
The Republican Party defended the federal constitutional structure and representative government; it held that the political and administrative autonomy of the states assured the national unity and "the peace and prestige of the Republic". The RP supported separation of powers between the executive, legislature and judiciary, as well as bicameralism, universal suffrage, and compulsory voting by secret ballot. It also insisted on a single-term limit for the president and the state governors.

Economically, the party advocated state intervention to "stimulate, support and supply private initiative, to regulate competition and avoid abuses and exploitation that sacrifice the collective economy. For the party, the State should abstain from production or intermediary activities in the economy. Private property should be maintained "as an element of individual freedom and as the best form of social use of goods, subject, however, to the limitations of collective interest. Finally, the party believed in ensuring production on an economic basis, and of industrial decentralization, with the location of factories closer to the raw materials.

== Electoral history ==
=== Presidential Elections ===
The party never fielded a presidential candidate. It often supported PSD candidates. The exception was in 1960, when the party supported the candidacy of Jânio Quadros.

Election	Candidate preferred by the Party	Running mate	Coalition	First round		Second round		Result
Election	Candidate preferred by the Party	Running mate	Coalition	Votes	%	Votes	%	Result
1945	None	None	None	-	-	-	-	-
1950	Cristiano Machado (PSD)	None	PSD; PR; POT; PST	1.697.173	21,49%	-	-	Lost ✗
1955	Juscelino Kubitschek (PSD)	None	PSD; PTB; PR; PTN; PST; PRT	3.077.411	35,68%	-	-	Elected ✓
1960	Jânio Quadros (PTN)	None	PTN; UDN; PR; PL; PDC	5.636.623	48,26%	-	-	Elected ✓
1964	None	None	None	-	-	-	-	-
