= 1954 Brazilian legislative election =

- 3 October 1954
- Chamber of Deputies
- All 326 seats in the Chamber of Deputies
Party	Leader	Vote %	Seats	+/–
PSD	Nereu Ramos	23.13	114	+2
PTB	João Goulart	15.68	56	+5
UDN	Arthur F. dos Santos	14.27	74	−7
PSP	Adhemar de Barros	9.35	32	+8
PR	Artur Bernardes	2.67	19	+8
PTN		2.07	6	+1
PSB		1.48	3	+2
PDC		1.27	2	0
PL		1.24	8	+3
PRP	Plínio Salgado	0.76	3	+1
PRT		0.71	1	0
PST		0.35	2	−7
Other parties		0.49	6	
This lists parties that won seats. See the complete results below.
- Senate
- 42 seats in the Senate
Party	Leader	Vote %	Seats	+/–
PSD	Nereu Ramos	13.33	16	+10
PSP	Adhemar de Barros	11.69	2	−1
UDN	Arthur F. dos Santos	11.16	10	+6
PTB	João Goulart	8.46	10	+5
PTN		3.50	1	New
PR	Artur Bernardes	0.85	1	−10
PL		0.28	2	+2
This lists parties that won seats. See the complete results below.

Legislative elections were held in Brazil on 3 October 1954. The Social Democratic Party remained the largest party in both the Chamber of Deputies and the Senate. Voter turnout was 65.5%.

== Results ==
=== Chamber of Deputies ===
Party	Votes	%	Seats	+/–
Social Democratic Party	2,136,220	23.13	114	+2
Brazilian Labour Party	1,447,784	15.68	56	+5
National Democratic Union	1,318,101	14.27	74	–7
Social Progressive Party	863,401	9.35	32	+12
PSD–PTB	411,521	4.46	–	–
PSD–PRP–PL	257,247	2.79	–	–
UDN–PTB–PR	251,891	2.73	–	–
Republican Party	246,487	2.67	19	+8
PSD–PDC–PSP–PL–PRP	221,259	2.40	–	–
UDN–PR–PL	218,503	2.37	–	–
PTB–PST	207,757	2.25	–	–
National Labor Party	190,839	2.07	6	+1
PR–PDC	151,003	1.63	–	–
Brazilian Socialist Party	136,329	1.48	3	+2
PSD–PL	123,839	1.34	–	–
Christian Democratic Party	117,345	1.27	2	0
Liberator Party	114,665	1.24	8	+3
UDN–PSP	97,604	1.06	–	–
PSD–UDN	85,937	0.93	–	–
PTB–PR	81,756	0.89	–	–
PRP–PSP	78,129	0.85	–	–
Popular Representation Party	70,346	0.76	3	+1
PSP–UDN–PL	67,515	0.73	–	–
Labour Republican Party	65,325	0.71	1	0
PSD–PTB–PDC–PSB–PS–PR	53,123	0.58	–	–
UDN–PST–PSP	50,099	0.54	–	–
PSD–PSB–PR	48,968	0.53	–	–
PSP-PST	44,720	0.48	–	–
Social Labour Party	32,440	0.35	2	–7
Others	45,630	0.49	6	+6
Total	9,235,783	100.00	326	+22
Valid votes	9,235,783	93.38		
Invalid/blank votes	654,692	6.62		
Total votes	9,890,475	100.00		
Registered voters/turnout	15,104,604	65.48		
Source: Nohlen

=== Senate ===
Party	Votes	%	Seats
Social Democratic Party	2,102,000	13.33	16
Social Progressive Party	1,843,230	11.69	2
National Democratic Union	1,758,872	11.16	10
Brazilian Labour Party	1,333,345	8.46	10
National Labor Party	551,549	3.50	1
Republican Party	134,110	0.85	1
Christian Democratic Party	107,050	0.68	0
Brazilian Socialist Party	70,015	0.44	0
Popular Representation Party	60,814	0.39	0
Liberator Party	44,342	0.28	2
Social Labour Party	475	0.00	0
Coalitions and others	7,759,564	49.22	0
Total	15,765,366	100.00	42
Total votes	9,862,892	–	
Registered voters/turnout	15,057,722	65.50	
Source: Nohlen
