= Odilon Braga =

Brazilian lawyer and politician

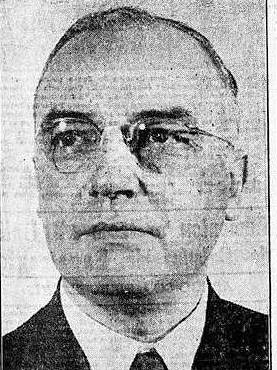

Minister of Agriculture
- In office July 24, 1935 – November 10, 1937
- President: Getúlio Vargas
- Preceded by: José Solano Carneiro da Cunha
- Succeeded by: Fernando de Sousa Costa

Personal details
- Born: August 3, 1894 Guarani, Minas Gerais, Rep. of the United States of Brazil
- Died: June 11, 1958 (aged 63) Rio de Janeiro, Rep. of the United States of Brazil
- Occupation: Politician, lawyer

Odilon Duarte Braga (3 August 1894, in Guarani, Minas Gerais – 11 June 1958, in Rio de Janeiro) was a Brazilian lawyer and politician.

Braga served as Minister of Agriculture under Getúlio Vargas between July 24, 1935, and November 10, 1937.
