= Yedo Fiúza =

Brazilian politician (1894–1975)

Mayor of Petrópolis
- In office 5 October 1936 – 4 January 1938
- Preceded by: Carlos Magalhães Bastos
- Succeeded by: Mário Aloisio Cardoso de Miranda
- In office 5 August 1936 – 5 August 1936
- Preceded by: Nestor Ahrends
- Succeeded by: Carlos Magalhães Bastos
- In office 13 February 1936 – 14 May 1936
- Preceded by: José de Carvalho Júnior
- Succeeded by: Nestor Ahrends
- In office 19 December 1930 – 31 December 1934
- Preceded by: Romão Veriano da Silva Pereira
- Succeeded by: Stephane Vannier

Personal details
- Born: 15 September 1894 Porto Alegre, Rio Grande do Sul, Brazil
- Died: February 12, 1975 (aged 80)
- Party: PSB; PCB
- Spouse: Maria Teresa Sampaio

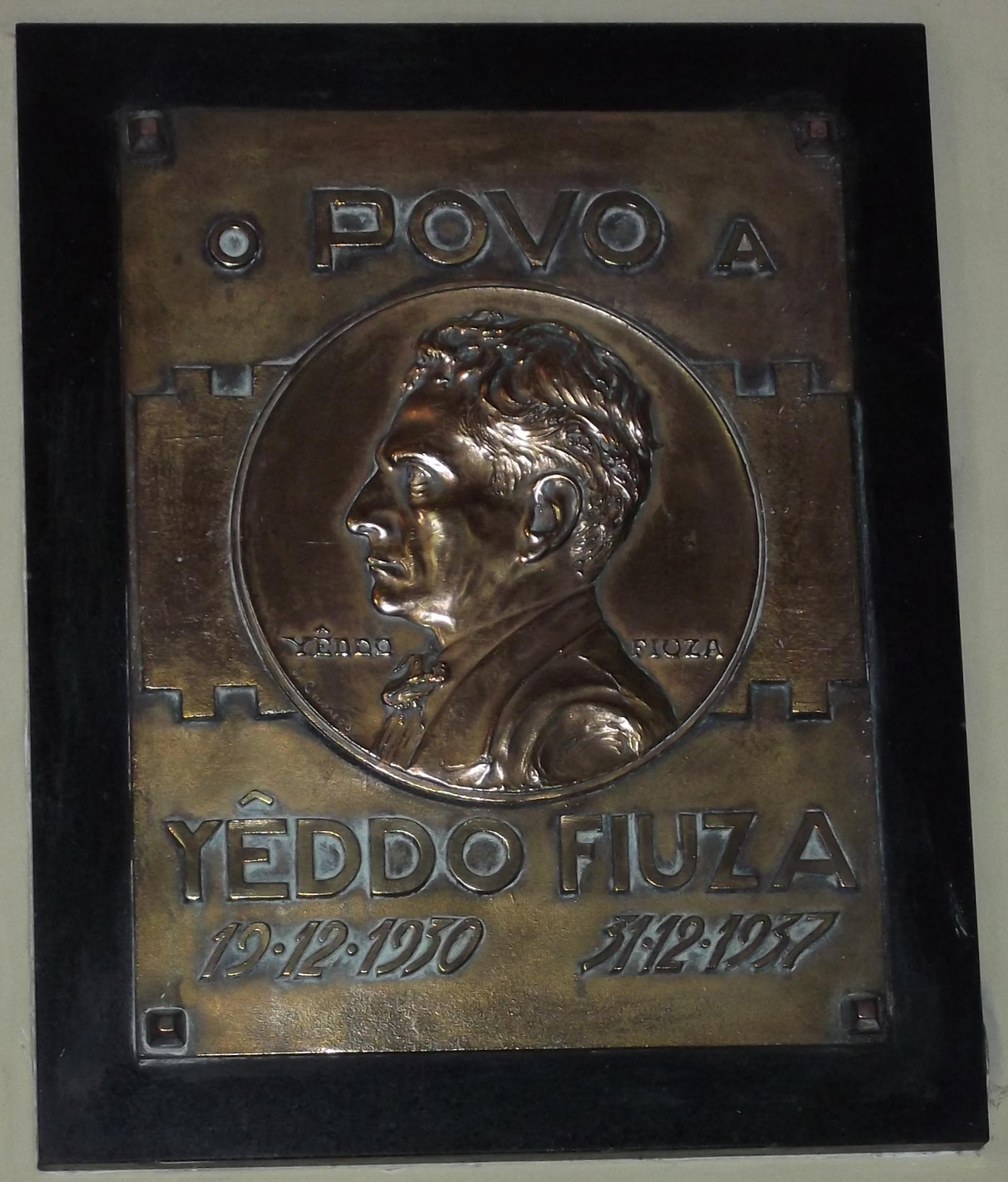
Yedo Fiúza memorial plaque

Yedo Fiúza (15 September 1894 – 12 February 1975) was a Brazilian politician. He served as mayor of Petrópolis. He contested the 1945 presidential election as an antimilitarist independent, with the support of the Brazilian Communist Party (PCB). Fiúza surprised political analysts by polling half a million votes.
