= Syndicalist Popular Party (Brazil) =

Political party in Brazil

The Syndicalist Popular Party (Portuguese: Partido Popular Sindicalista, PPS) was a political party in Brazil founded in 1945 by Miguel Reale. The PPS merged with other parties to form the Social Progressive Party (PPS) in 1946.

In the 1945 election, the PPS elected four deputies and one Senator - Olavo de Oliveira in Ceará.
