= Benjamim Vargas =

Brazilian politician

Benjamin Vargas

Benjamim Dornelles Vargas (October 27, 1897 – March 26, 1973), also known as Bejo, was a Brazilian politician. In 1934 he was constituent deputy of the Republican Party of Rio Grande do Sul (PRR).

He was the brother of Getúlio Vargas.
