= Fourth Brazilian Republic =

Period of Brazilian history from 1946 to 1964

Republic of the United States of Brazil República dos Estados Unidos do Brasil
- 1946–1964
- Flag (1960–1964) Coat of arms
- Motto: "Ordem e Progresso" (English: "Order and Progress")
- Anthem: "Hino Nacional Brasileiro" (English: "Brazilian National Anthem")
- Capital: Rio de Janeiro (until 1960); Brasília (after 1960)
- Common languages: Portuguese
- Religion (1950): 93% Catholic; 7% Others
- Government: Federal presidential republic (1946–1961; 1963–1964) Federal parliamentary republic (1961–1963)
- President
  - 1946–1951 (first): Gaspar Dutra
  - 1961–1964 (last): João Goulart
- Prime Minister
  - 1961–1962: Tancredo Neves
  - 1962: Brochado da Rocha
  - 1962–1963: Hermes Lima
- Legislature: National Congress
  - Upper house: Senate
  - Lower house: Chamber of Deputies
- Historical era: Cold War
  - Inauguration of Dutra: 31 January 1946
  - Constitution of 1946: 18 September 1946
  - Brasília as capital: 21 April 1960
  - Legality Campaign: 25 August 1961 – 7 September 1961
  - Parliamentary system: 8 September 1961
  - 1963 referendum: 24 January 1963
  - 1964 coup d'état: 1 April 1964

Population
  - 1950: 51,944,397
  - 1960: 70,992,343
- Currency: Cruzeiro
Preceded by	Succeeded by
Third Brazilian Republic	Military dictatorship

The Fourth Brazilian Republic, also known as the "Populist Republic" or as the "Republic of 46", is the period of Brazilian history between 1946 and 1964. It was marked by political instability and the military's pressure on civilian politicians which ended with the 1964 Brazilian coup d'état and the establishment of the Brazilian military dictatorship.

This period was marked by often tumultuous presidencies of Eurico Gaspar Dutra, Getúlio Vargas, Café Filho, Juscelino Kubitschek, Jânio Quadros and João Goulart. In 1945, president Getúlio Vargas was deposed by a bloodless military coup, but his influence in Brazilian politics remained until the end of the Fourth Republic. During this period, three parties dominated national politics. Two of them were pro-Vargas—the Brazilian Labour Party (Partido Trabalhista Brasileiro, PTB) to the left and the Social Democratic Party (Partido Social Democrático, PSD) in the center—and another anti-Vargas party, the rightist National Democratic Union (União Democrática Nacional, UDN).

== End of the Estado Novo, 1945 ==
As the Second World War ended with Brazil participating on the Allied side, then-President Getúlio Vargas moved to liberalize his own fascist-influenced Estado Novo regime. Vargas decreed an amnesty to political prisoners, including the chief of the Communist Party, Luís Carlos Prestes.

He also introduced an electoral law and allowed political parties to campaign. Three political parties introduced themselves into the national political scene. The liberal and rightist parties of the opposition against Vargas created the National Democratic Union. The bureaucrats and supporters of the Estado Novo grouped in the Brazilian Social Democratic Party. Vargas also created the Brazilian Labour Party, to the left, to group the workers' and the laborers' unions. The Brazilian Communist Party, weakened during the dictatorship, was also legalised.

The Estado Novo ended when two of his most rightist supporters, the Minister of War Eurico Gaspar Dutra, and Army Chief-of-Staff Pedro Aurélio de Góis Monteiro led a military coup on 29 October 1945. The president of the Supreme Federal Court, José Linhares, was inaugurated as president of Brazil. Linhares guaranteed free and regular elections and Vargas was forced into retirement. General Eurico Gaspar Dutra was elected president.

== Dutra, 1946–1951 ==
On 18 September 1946, the fifth constitution of Brazil was adopted, marking the country's return to democratic rule. That same year, the government created the Social Service of Industry (SESI) and Social Service of Commerce (SESC), and the General Staff, the future General Staff of the Armed Forces (EMFA).

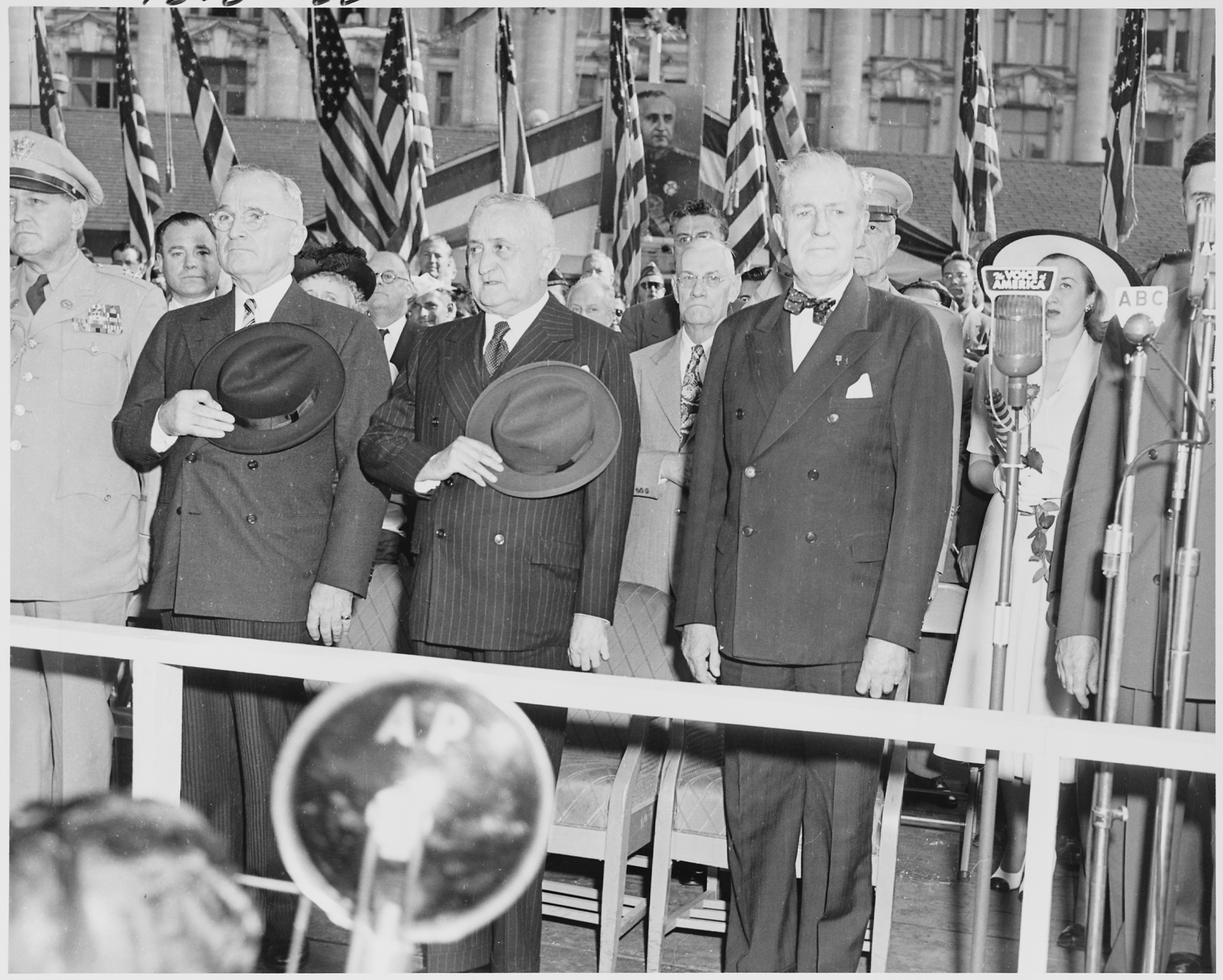
U.S. President Truman and Brazilian President Eurico Dutra (center) during his visit to Washington, 1949

In 1946, Dutra ordered the closing of casinos and prohibited "gambling" in the country. In 1947, he appointed Osvaldo Aranha as representative of Brazil to the United Nations, outlawed the Brazilian Communist Party, ended diplomatic relations with the Soviet Union and organized the Inter-American Conference of Peacekeeping and Security of the Continent in Petrópolis, which was attended by U.S. president Harry Truman. In October 1948, his government set up the Superior School of War (ESG), with American support. Closer relations with the United States were displayed by the formation of the Joint Commission of Brazil-United States, known as Abbink Mission, headed by John Abbink and Minister Octavio Gouveia de Bouillon.

The development strategy of the government included the "Salte Plan", which put emphasis on health, food, transportation and energy. Proposed in 1947, the plan aimed at better management of public spending and investment in key sectors in the country but only began to receive funding from the budget in 1949, being forgotten in 1951. During this period, measurements of the country's economic growth by calculating the Gross Domestic Product were first regularly published. The average annual growth of the Brazilian economy during the Dutra administration was 7.6%.

On 6 August 1947 the Brazilian Socialist Party (PSB) was founded, but remained minor at the time.

In 1950, Brazil hosted 1950 FIFA World Cup for which the famous Maracanã Stadium was built.

During the Dutra government, construction of the hydroelectric plant of Paulo Afonso, in Bahia, and the Presidente Dutra highway, linking Rio to São Paulo, was initiated.

== Vargas, 1951–1954 ==
In 1950, Vargas was elected president and returned to national politics. The Vargas administration was hampered by an economic crisis, congressional opposition, and impatience among his supporters. He announced an ambitious industrialization plan and pursued a policy of nationalization of the country's natural resources. To reduce foreign dependency, he founded Petrobras, the Brazilian state oil enterprise.

By 1954, Vargas faced opposition from the UDN and the military. The murder of Major Rubens Vaz, an associate of opposition newspaper editor Carlos Lacerda, by some of the president's bodyguards, known as the crime of "Rua Tonelero", led to a reaction against Vargas. Army generals demanded his resignation.

After failing to negotiate a temporary leave of absence, Vargas declared "he would only leave the Catete (Presidential Palace) dead". Acknowledging that the chances that a democratic government would succeed him were none, and that another military coup was coming, with probably worse results than 1950s one, Vargas kept his word and shot himself in the heart on 24 August 1954, after writing a letter blaming "international groups" and "revolted national groups" for the current situation. The results were immediate: opposition newspapers were closed, the people took to the streets and in a last show of political force and popularity, Vargas postponed the military dictatorship by 10 years.

=== Collapse of Brazilian populism ===
Vargas' ever-shifting populist dictatorship helped to rein in the agrarian oligarchs, paving the way for the democratization of the 1950s and 1960s which was ended by the right-wing 1964 military coup. But the state still maintained a loose variation of Getúlio Vargas' populism and economic nationalism. Between 1930 and 1964, as Brazilian populism itself guided changes in the structure of Brazil's economy (Vargas' policies promoted industrial growth), Vargas and his successors were forced to shift the makeup of particular kinds of class alliances reconciled by the state.

After Vargas' suicide in 1954, awaiting a seemingly inevitable military coup, the support base for Brazilian populism began to deteriorate. Vargas' first ouster from 1945–1951 and his suicide demonstrated that Brazilian populism had been deteriorating for some time. Brazilian populism lingered for another decade but in new forms. If corporatism was the hallmark of the 1930s and 1940s, nationalism and developmentalism characterized the 1950s and early 1960s. Each of these contributed to the crisis that gripped Brazil and resulted in the authoritarian regime after 1964.

Thus, as the historical context shifted, so did the ideology of Brazilian populism. Between 1934 and 1945, Brazilian populism was a reactionary phenomenon, exhibiting parallels to European fascism. In contrast, under the presidency of João Goulart (1961–64) — a protégé of Getúlio Vargas and another gaúcho from Rio Grande do Sul, the closeness of the government to the historically disenfranchised working class and peasantry and even to the Communist Party led by Luís Carlos Prestes was remarkable.

Goulart appeared to have been co-opting the Communist movement in a manner reminiscent of Vargas' co-optation of the Integralists shortly—and not coincidentally—before his ouster by reactionary forces. Eventually, the 1964 junta and the ensuing military dictatorship proved that the establishment forces that ushered Goulart's mentor into power in the first place, and the bourgeoisie that Vargas helped rear found the left-leaning turn of Brazilian populism intolerable.

== Interim Presidents, 1954–1956 ==
After the suicide of Vargas, Vice President Café Filho assumed the Presidency of the Republic from August 24, 1954 until November 8, 1955 when, due to illness, he transferred his powers to the President of the Chamber of Deputies. Acting President Carlos Luz (November 8 - 11) was quickly removed by the National Congress under pressure of the Minister of the Army. Vice President of the Federal Senate Nereu Ramos took over as Interim President until 31 January 1956, when President-elect Juscelino Kubitschek was inaugurated.

== Kubitschek, 1956–1961 ==
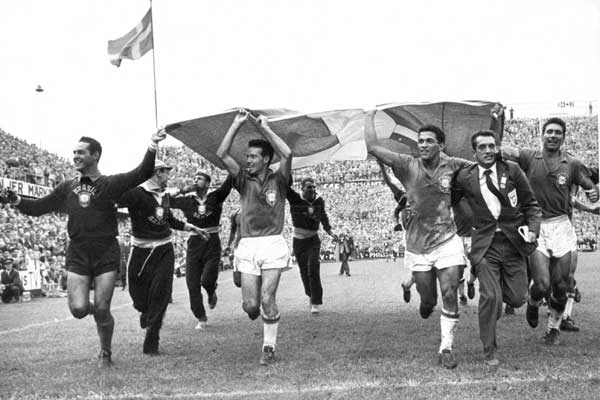
Brazilian football team, 1958

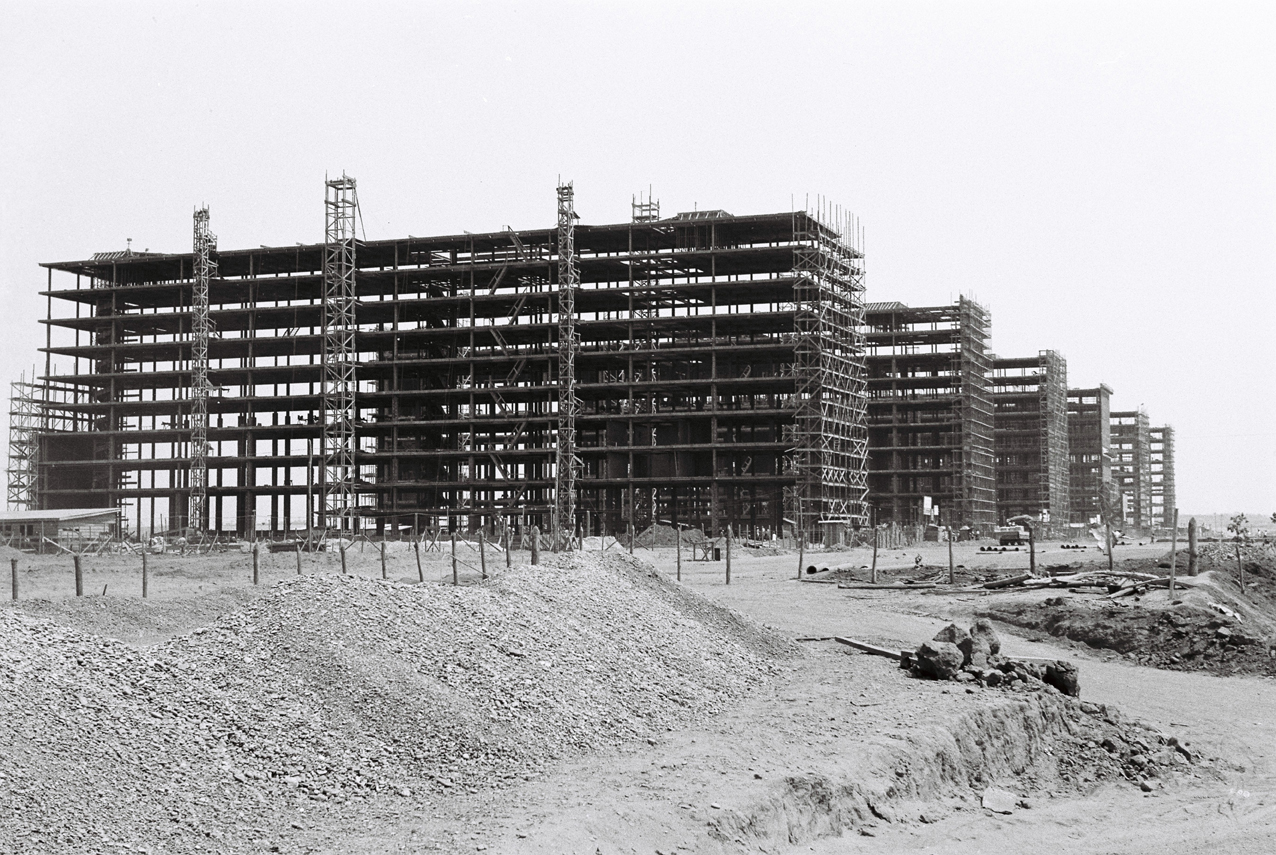
Construction of Brasília, 1959.

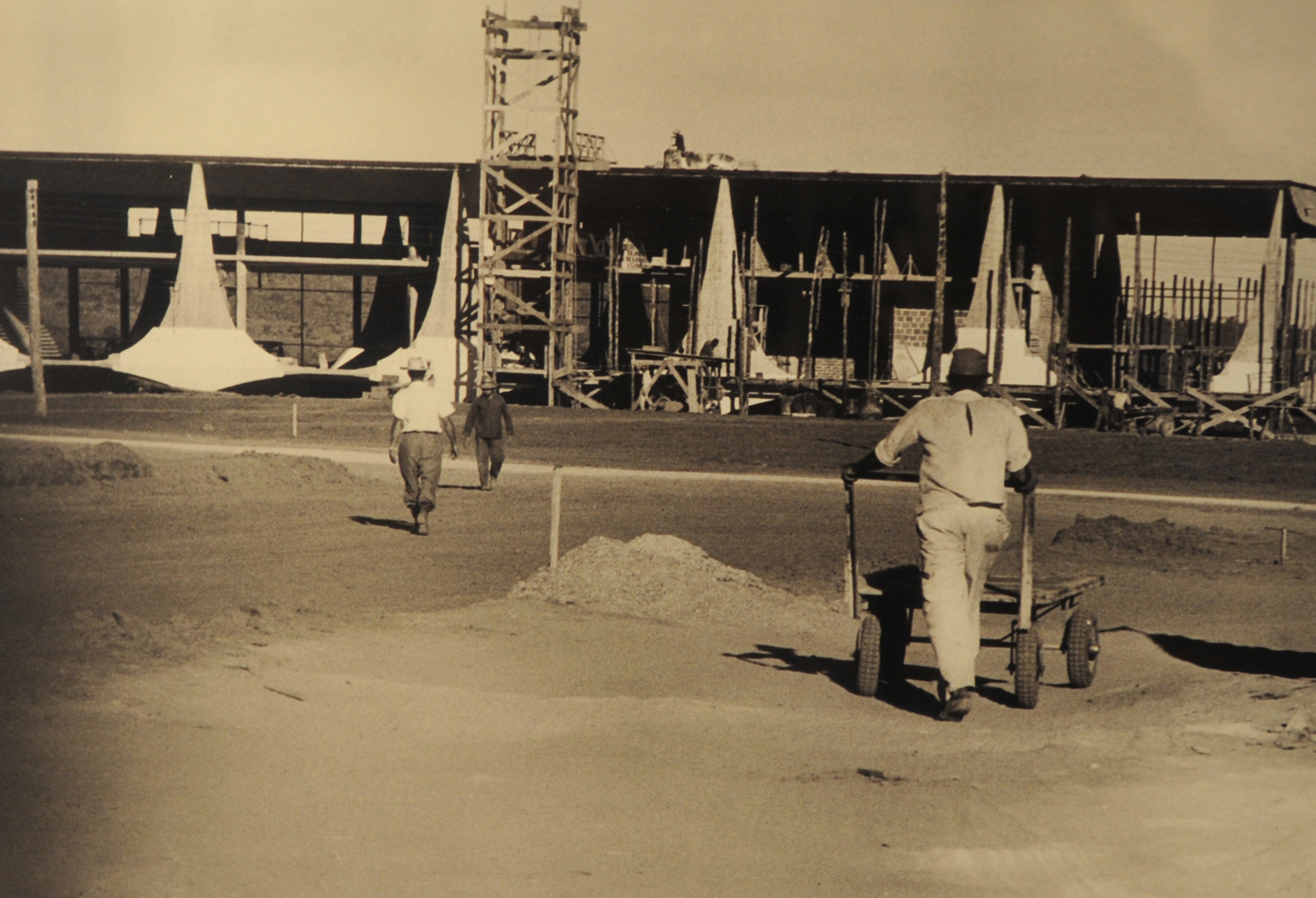
Construction of Palácio da Alvorada in Brasilia

Kubitschek's presidency was marked by a time of political optimism. Campaigning on a platform of "fifty years [of progress] in five" he presented a plan of national development that had 31 goals distributed in six large groups: energy, transport, food, base industries, education and the main goal: the construction of new capital city Brasília. This plan sought to stimulate the diversification and expansion of the Brazilian economy, based on industrial growth and closer integration of the country's territory. Kubitschek promoted the development of the automobile industry, naval industry, heavy industry, and the construction of hydro-electric power plants. With the exception of the hydro-electric industry, Kubitschek practically created an economy without state-owned companies.

Kubitschek sought to achieve this progress with the aid of foreign investment, which in turn would be given generous incentives, such as profit remittances, low taxes, privileges for the importation of machinery, and land donations. However, the exemption was made only if the foreign capital was associated with the national capital ("associated capital"). This influx of foreign capital threatened domestic industry, which was unable to compete with efficiency and expertise of foreign companies. Domestic manufacturers, once the core base of support for economic nationalism, become managers or partners of the multinational companies. The urban bourgeoisie — the original base of Vargas' coalition — had little use for Brazilian populism any more, having outgrown state planning phase.

In 1958, Brazil won the 1958 FIFA World Cup.

By the end of his term, the foreign debt had grown from 87 million dollars to 297 million dollars. The inflation and wealth inequality had grown larger, with the occurrence of rural-zone strikes that expanded to the urban areas.

== Quadros, 1961 ==
Jânio Quadros was elected president of Brazil by a landslide in 1960, running as the candidate of the National Labor Party (PTN). When Quadros took office, on 31 January 1961, it was the first time since Brazil became a republic in 1889 that an incumbent government peacefully transferred power to an elected member of the opposition. It was also the first time in 31 years that the presidency was not held by an heir to the legacy of Getúlio Vargas.

Quadros laid the blame for the country's high rate of inflation on his predecessor, Juscelino Kubitschek. As president, Quadros outlawed gambling, banned women from wearing bikinis on the beach, and established relations with the Soviet Union and Cuba, trying to achieve a neutralist international policy. The re-establishment of relations with the Socialist Bloc in the middle of the Cold War cost him the support of the UDN in Congress, so he was left with no real power.

=== Resignation crisis ===
Quadros resigned on 25 August 1961, citing foreign and "terrible forces" in his resignation letter. His resignation is commonly thought to have been a move to increase his own power, as he expected to return to the presidency by the acclamation of the Brazilian people or by the request of the National Congress of Brazil and the military. This maneuver, however, was immediately rejected by Congress, which accepted his resignation and called on the president of the Chamber of Deputies, Pascoal Ranieri Mazzilli, to assume office until the vice president, João Goulart, came back from his trip to Communist China.

== Goulart, 1961–1964 ==
Goulart faced strong opposition from conservative politicians and military officers in his bid to assume the presidency, triggering the Legality Campaign. The crisis was solved by the "parliamentarian solution" – an arrangement that decreased his powers as president by creating a new post of Prime Minister, which was filled by Tancredo Neves, and instituting a Parliamentary republic. Goulart finally assumed office on 7 September 1961.

Brazil returned to a presidential government in 1963 after a referendum and, as Goulart's powers grew, it became evident that he would seek to implement his "Reformas de base" ("base reforms"), such as land reform and nationalization of enterprises in various economic sectors, regardless of assent from established institutions such as Congress. These reforms, aimed at addressing growing social inequalities, were strongly opposed by landowners, industrialists and the military, who feared they would weaken traditional power structures and shift Brazil toward socialism. Goulart also faced increasing pressure from the U.S. government, which saw his policies as aligned with leftists movements in Latin America, leading to increased scrutiny from Washington. Goulart had low parliamentarian support, due to the fact that his centrist attempts to win support from both sides of the spectrum gradually came to alienate both.

As opposition to Goulart intensified, conservative factions mobilized to prevent his reforms. The Instituto de Pesquisas e Estudos Sociais (IPES) and Instituto Brasileiro de Ação Democrática (IBAD), heavily funded by U.S. interests, played a central role in coordinating anti-Goulart propaganda and supporting conservative candidates in Congress to block his policies. As the political crisis deepened in March 1964, military leaders, supported by conservative civilian factions, moved decisively toward Goulart’s overthrow.

On 1 April 1964, after a night of conspiracy, rebel troops made their way to Rio de Janeiro, considered a loyalist bastion. São Paulo and Rio de Janeiro's generals were convinced to join the coup. The U.S., which had closely been monitoring the political crisis, quickly recognized the new military and positioned naval forces nearby as part of the Operation Brother Sam to signal its support. To prevent a civil war, and knowing that the U.S. would openly support the army, Goulart fled first to Rio Grande do Sul, and then went into exile in Uruguay.
