= Cristiano Machado =

Brazilian politician (1893–1953)

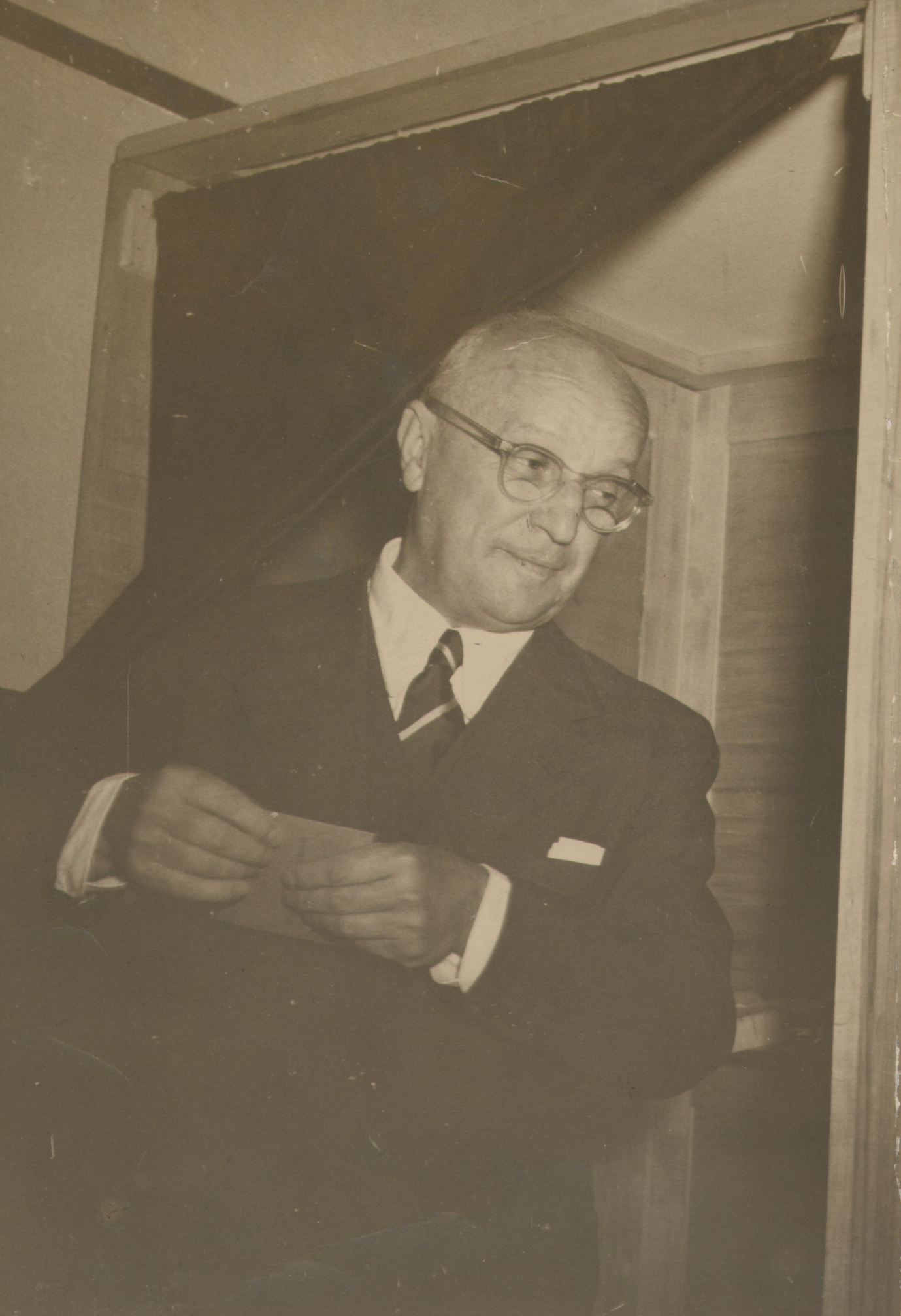

Brazilian Ambassador to the Holy See
- In office October, 1953–December 26, 1953

Federal Deputy for Minas Gerais
- In office 1945–1950

Mayor of Belo Horizonte
- In office 1926‐1929
- Preceded by: Francisco da L. Silva Campos
- Succeeded by: Alcides Lins

Personal details
- Born: 5 November 1893 Sabará, Brazil
- Died: 26 December 1953 (aged 60) Rome, Italy

Cristiano Machado (5 November 1893 – 26 December 1953) was a Brazilian politician.

Machado served as Mayor of Belo Horizonte between 1926 and 1929. He served as Congressman for Minas Gerais between 1945 and 1950, representing the Social Democratic Party (PSD). He was nominated as the PSD's candidate in the 1950 presidential election, but most members of the PSD supported the candidacy of Getúlio Vargas and he won only 21.49%.

He was named Brazilian ambassador to the Holy See in October 1953, but died shortly after taking office.
