= Eurico Gaspar Dutra =

President of Brazil from 1946 to 1951

His Excellency Eurico Dutra
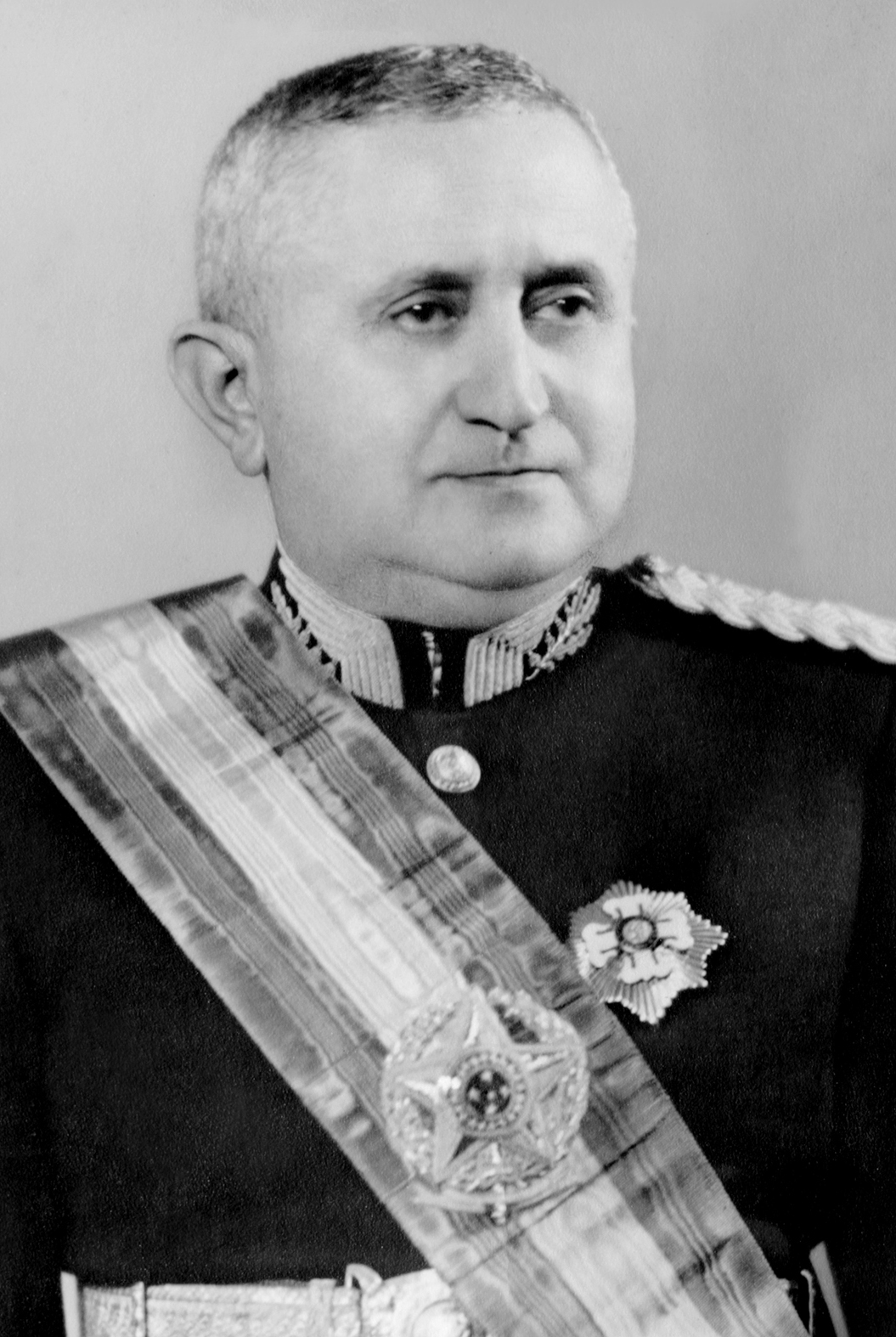
- Official portrait, 1946

16th President of Brazil
- In office 31 January 1946 – 31 January 1951
- Vice President: None (Jan–Sep 1946); Nereu Ramos (1946–1951)
- Preceded by: José Linhares
- Succeeded by: Getúlio Vargas

Minister of War
- In office 5 December 1936 – 3 August 1945
- President: Getúlio Vargas
- Preceded by: João Gomes
- Succeeded by: Góis Monteiro

President of the Military Club
- In office 1933–1934
- Preceded by: José Vitoriano Aranha da Silva
- Succeeded by: Guedes da Fontoura

Personal details
- Born: 18 May 1883 Cuiabá, Mato Grosso, Empire of Brazil
- Died: 11 June 1974 (aged 91) Rio de Janeiro, Guanabara, Brazil
- Party: PSD (1945–1965); ARENA (1965–1974)
- Spouse: Carmela Teles Leite (m. 1914; died 1947)
- Children: 2
- Education: Military School of Realengo; School of Artillery and Engineering; Army General Staff School
- Profession: military; politician

Military service
- Allegiance: Brazil
- Branch/service: Brazilian Army
- Years of service: 1922–1974
- Rank: Field Marshal
- Commands: See list: 2nd Infantry Brigade (1932–1933); Directorate of Military Aviation (1933–1935); 1st Infantry Brigade (1935); 1st Military Region (1935–1936)
- Battles/wars: Lieutenant revolts; Rio de Janeiro; São Paulo; Revolution of 1930; Constitutionalist Revolution; Communist Uprising; Integralist Uprising; Second World War
- Eurico Gaspar Dutra's voice Speech by Eurico Dutra on the severing of diplomatic relations between Brazil and the Soviet Union (recorded 1947)

Eurico Gaspar Dutra (Brazilian Portuguese: [ewˈɾiku ɡasˈpaʁ ˈdutɾɐ]; 18 May 1883 – 11 June 1974) was a Brazilian military leader and politician who served as the president of Brazil from 1946 to 1951. He was the first president of the Fourth Brazilian Republic, which followed the Vargas Regime.

== Biography ==
Dutra was born in Cuiabá, Mato Grosso. He later falsified his birth year to 1885, at age 19, so that he would have a physical compatible with the age, in order to facilitate his entry into the Army. He studied at the Preparatory and Tactical School of Rio Grande do Sul (1902–1904) and at the Military Academy of Brazil (Military School of ‘’Praia Vermelha’’ in Rio de Janeiro) in 1904, of which he was expelled for taking part in an uprising that same year, related to the Vaccine Revolt, but pardoned, returned to school, now based in Realengo, completing the course in 1906. He was also a student of the School of War in Porto Alegre (1906), the School of Artillery and Engineering, where perfected in mechanics, ballistics and metallurgy (1908–1910), and the School of General Staff, where he graduated as the 1st in class and received the rare mention "très bien" (1922), acting shortly after, in the repression of the São Paulo Revolution of 1924.

Helped found the National Defense magazine in 1918, fought the uprising known as the "18 Fort" in 1922, in Rio de Janeiro, and participated, integrating the North Detachment, under the command of General Mena Barreto, of the fighting against an insurgency erupted in Manaus that radiated to Pará. By having fought the Revolution of 1930, he was sent to the command of the 11th Cavalry Independent Regiment in Ponta Porã.

Promoted to colonel, Dutra took command of the 4th Cavalry Divisional Regiment (1931–1933) in Três Corações, where he fought the Constitutionalist Revolution in São Paulo in 1932. Defended the government of President Washington Luís against the rebels of 1930s, but already in 1932, fought the Constitutionalist Revolution in São Paulo. Appointed commander of the 1st Military Region (1935–1936), stood out in reaction to the communist movement in 1935, episode known as “Intentona Comunista”, occupying the post of Minister of War (1936–1945).

== Minister of War ==
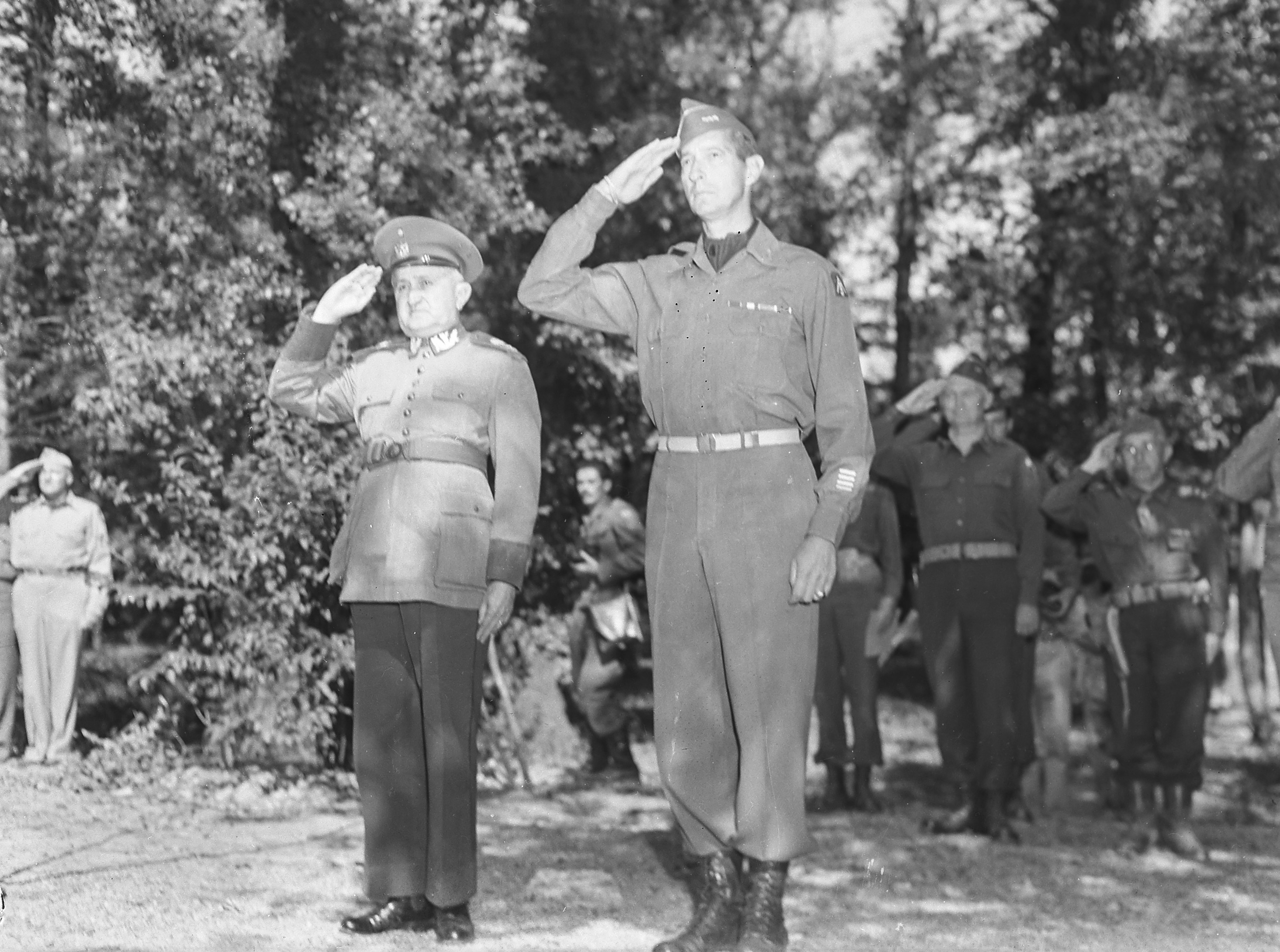
Minister of War Dutra (left) with U.S. Lieutenant General Mark W. Clark, commander of the Allied Fifth Army, Italy, 1944

During World War II, he was among the Brazilian military leaders who were against an alignment with the Allies and a deeper involvement of the country in the conflict. With, although modest, Brazil's participation in the war on the Allied side, and the growing pressure from civil society for democratization of the country, Dutra formally adhered to the idea of the end of the regime that started in 1930, participating in the following deposition of Getúlio Vargas in October 1945, continuing the interventionist doctrine, practiced at the time by the Brazilian army.

== 1945 election ==
In this context, the deposed leader announced the following month his support for Dutra, the candidate of the Army, at the expense of the candidate of the Air Force, Eduardo Gomes, in the elections that followed.

== Presidency ==
Dutra signs official documents during his inauguration as President of Brazil on 31 January 1946

On 18 September 1946, the fifth constitution of Brazil was enacted, marking the country's return to democratic rule. Later that year, the government created the Social Service of Industry (SESI) and Social Service of Commerce (SESC), and the General Staff, the future General Staff of the Armed Forces (EMFA). The same year, the president ordered the closing of casinos and prohibited gambling in the country.

In 1947, he registered the appointment of Osvaldo Aranha delegate of Brazil to the United Nations (UN), the forfeiture of the Brazilian Communist Party (PCB), breaking off diplomatic relations with the Soviet Union (USSR) and achieved, in Petrópolis, the Inter-American Conference of Peacekeeping and Security of the Continent, which was attended by the U.S. president, Harry Truman. Closer relations with the Americans was evidenced also in the formation of the Joint Commission Brazil-United States, known as Abbink Mission, headed by John Abbink and Minister Octavio Gouveia de Bouillon. Assignment was to diagnose the main problems of the Brazilian economy and, as a special recommendation, the use of external resources in the oil sector.

Still in 1947 was the intervention of the Ministry of Labour in many unions, continuing the guardianship of the state over union activities guaranteed by ordinance in 9.070 of March 1946, a regulation to limit the right to strike.

Concomitant with the union repression and wage restraint, economic policy has gone through two phases: the former was liberal and sought to break with previous forms of intervention in the economy. However, imports of goods led to a rapid depletion of the country's foreign exchange reserves. In 1947, under the guidance of the International Monetary Fund (IMF) a second phase, in which the exchange control was retaken, kept the Brazilian cruzeiro at high levels compared to the U.S. currency. This policy discouraged exports, encouraging, on the other hand, the import of equipment, machinery and other inputs, excluding consumer goods, and favored the expansion of the manufacturing sector.

The development strategy of the government included the “Salte Plan”, named for an emphasis on Health, Food, Transportation and Energy. Proposed in 1947, it aimed at the management of public spending and investment in key sectors in the country but only began to receive funding from the budget in 1949, being forgotten in 1951. During this period measurements the country's economic growth by calculating the Gross Domestic Product (GDP) were first regularly published. The average annual growth of the Brazilian economy under his administration was 7.6%.

During the Dutra government construction of the hydroelectric plant of Paulo Afonso, Bahia, and the President Dutra highway linking Rio to São Paulo was initiated. In October 1948 his government set up the Superior School of War (ESG), with American support.

== Later life ==
Upon leaving the presidency, he remained active in politics until he ran again for president in the indirect elections for president of 1964. Facing a difficult election against military-backed General Humberto de Alencar Castelo Branco, Dutra received only 0.55% of the vote.

He died away from public life in Rio de Janeiro on 11 June 1974, at 91. His body was buried in the São João Batista Cemetery.

== Gallery ==
=== 1949 state visit to the United States ===
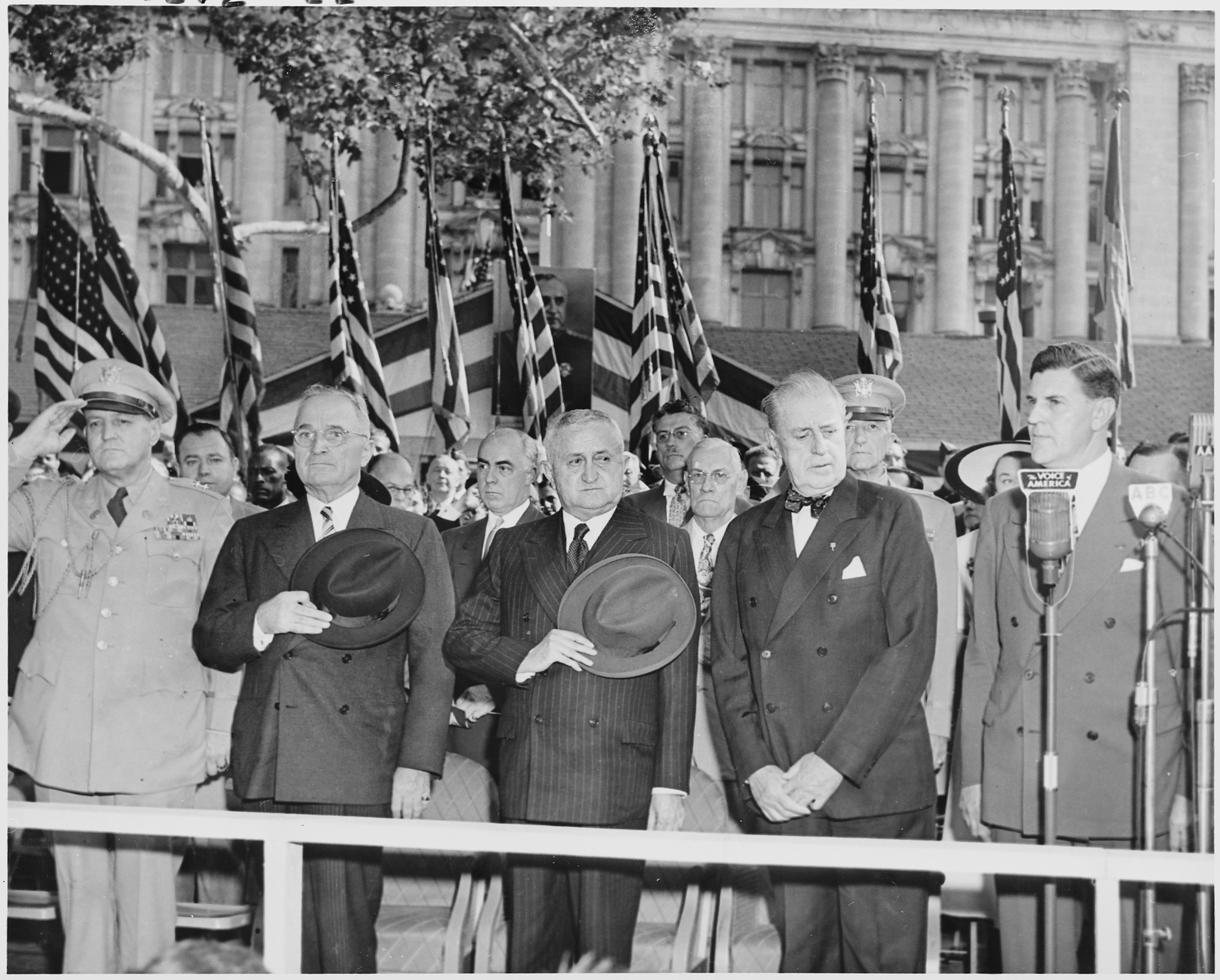
President Dutra and U.S. President Harry S. Truman standing at attention with other dignitaries during welcoming ceremonies for Dutra in Washington, D.C., on May 18.

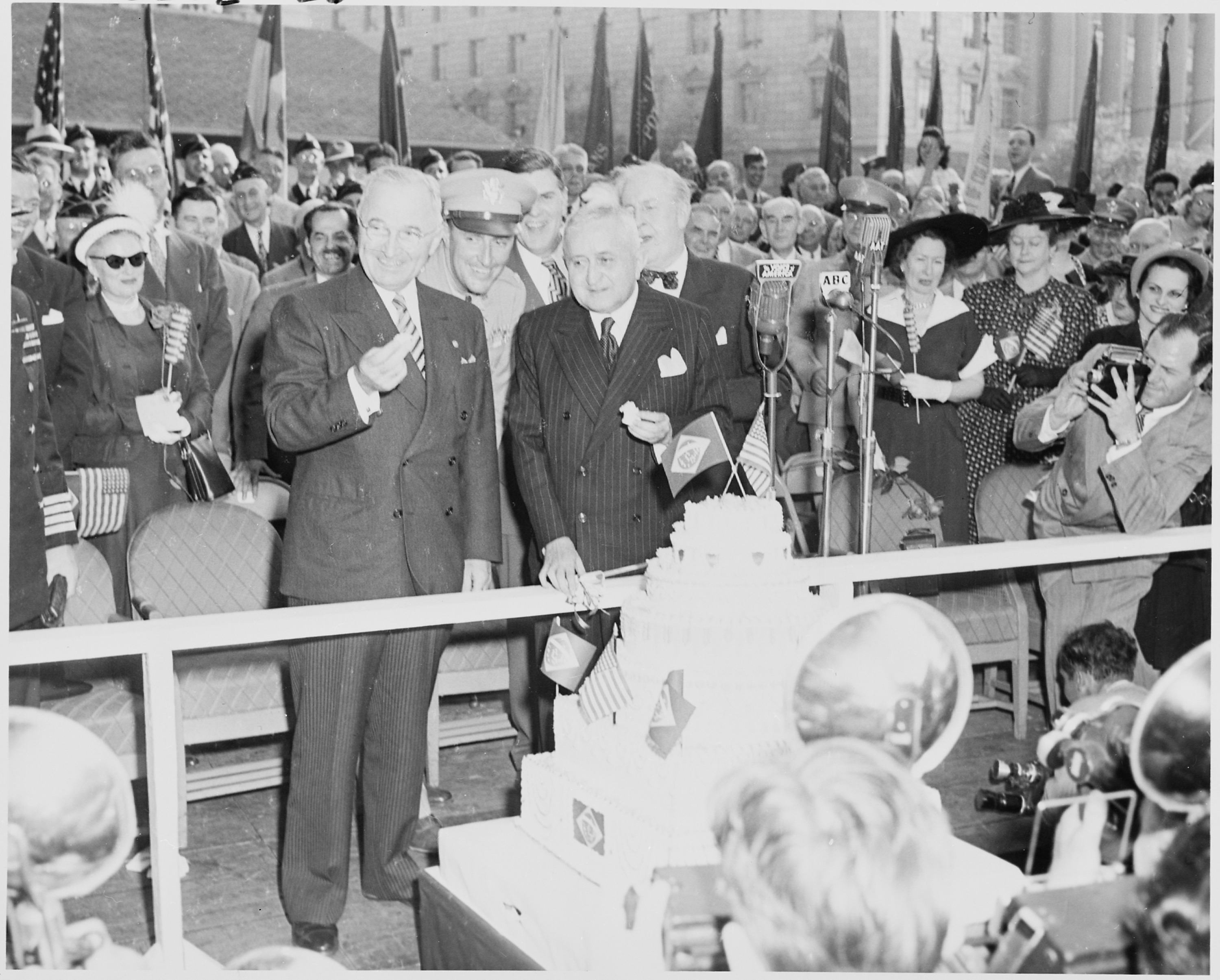
Presidents Dutra and Truman sampling a birthday cake decorated with Brazilian and U.S. flags.

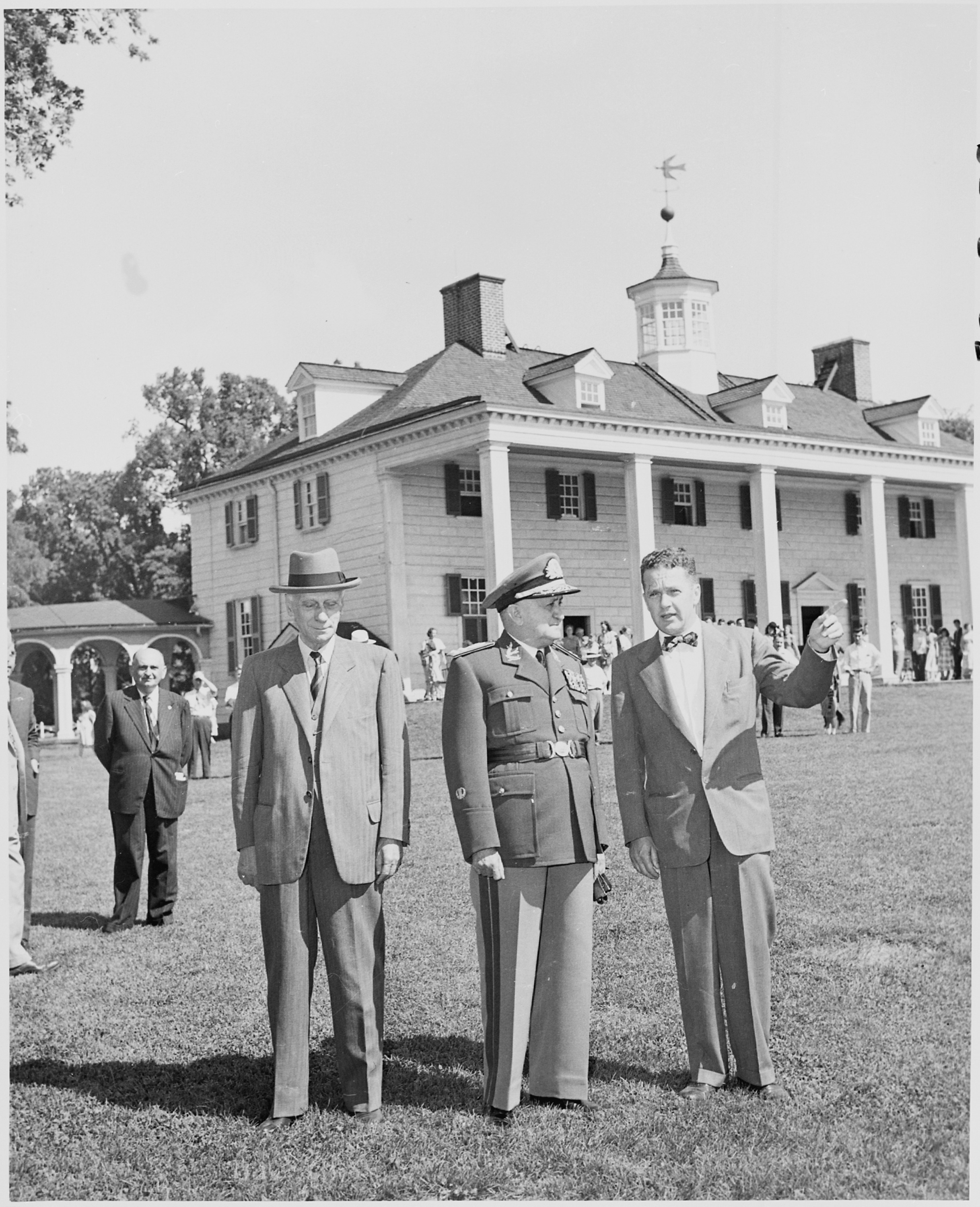
Dutra (in uniform), outside the George Washington home at Mount Vernon, during his visit to the United States.

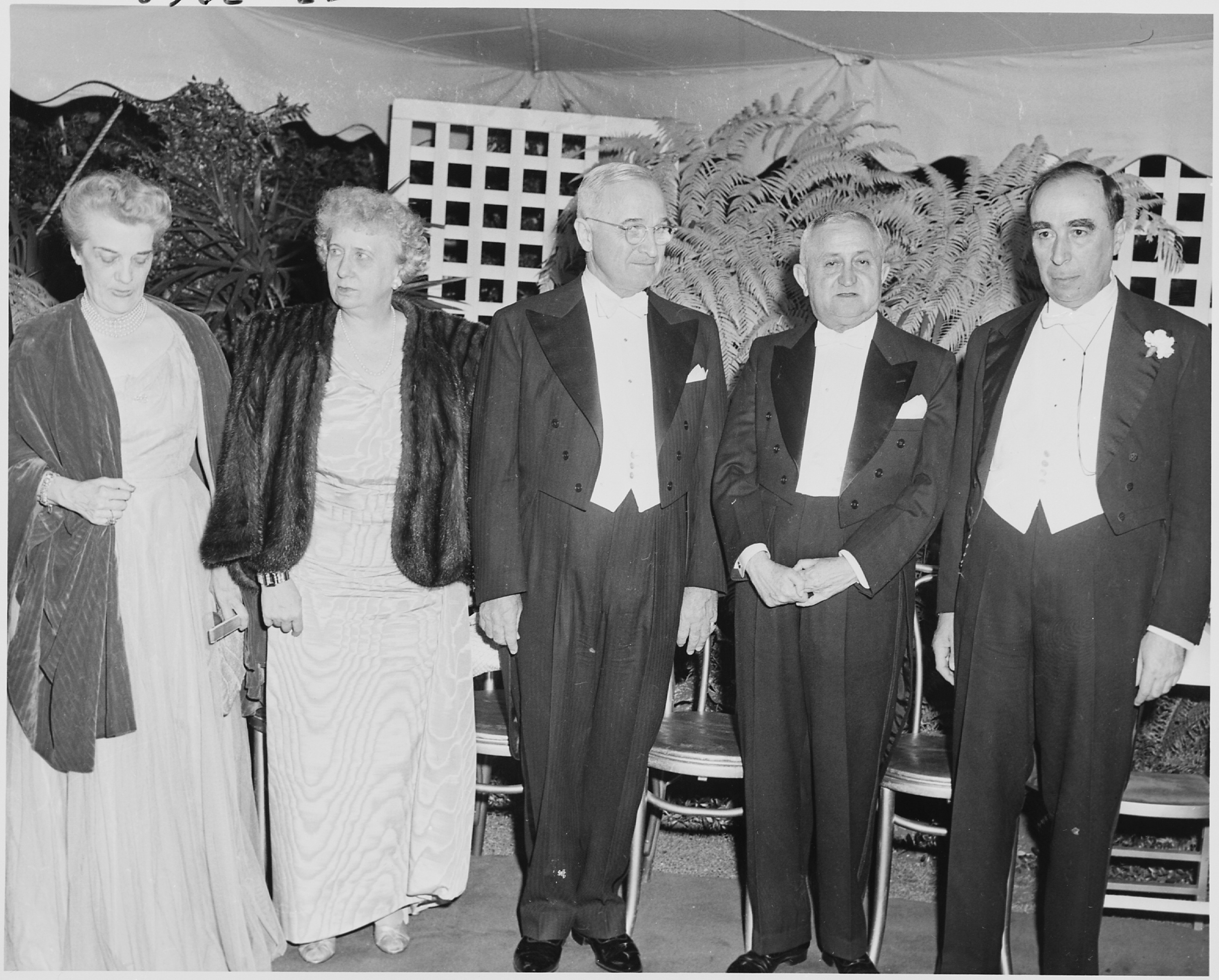
Dutra, Truman, Mrs. Truman and other dignitaries at a state dinner.

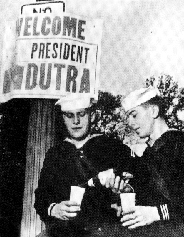
Americans greet Dutra with a gesture of welcome.

=== 1950 World Cup ===
Dutra (fifth from the left) at the opening match of the 1950 FIFA World Cup.

Civic offices
Preceded by José Vitoriano Aranha da Silva	President of the Military Club; 1933–1934	Succeeded by João Guedes da Fontoura
Political offices
Preceded by João Gomes Ribeiro Filho	Minister of War; 1936–1945	Succeeded by Pedro Aurélio de Góis Monteiro
Preceded by José Linhares (acting)	President of Brazil; 1946–1951	Succeeded by Getúlio Vargas
