= Lutero Vargas =

Brazilian physician, diplomat, and politician (1912–1989)

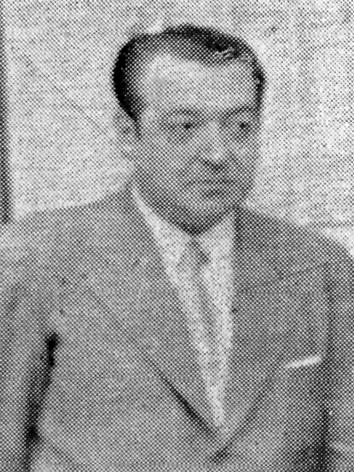

Ambassador of Brazil to Nicaragua
- In office 10 September 1962 – 16 April 1964
- Nominated by: João Goulart
- Preceded by: Mário Meneghetti
- Succeeded by: Manuel de Teffé

State Deputy of Guanabara
- In office 6 December 1960 – 10 September 1962
- Constituency: At-large

Member of the Chamber of Deputies
- In office 11 March 1951 – 3 February 1959
- Constituency: Federal District

Personal details
- Born: 24 February 1912 São Borja, Rio Grande do Sul, Brazil
- Died: 4 October 1989 (aged 77) Porto Alegre, Rio Grande do Sul, Brazil
- Party: PTB
- Spouse: Ingeborg ten Haeff (m. 1940; sep. 1944)
- Children: 1
- Parents: Getúlio Vargas (father); Darci Sarmanho (mother)
- Education: National Faculty of Medicine

Lutero Sarmanho Vargas (24 February 1912 – 4 October 1989) was a Brazilian physician, diplomat, and politician. He was the oldest son of former President of Brazil Getúlio Vargas.
