= Alzira Vargas =

Brazilian librarian and English interpreter (1914–1992)

29 and 35 First lady of Rio de Janeiro
- In office 31 January 1951 – 31 January 1955
- Governor: Amaral Peixoto
- Preceded by: Alcina Macedo Soares
- Succeeded by: Maria da Glória Azevedo
- In office 29 July 1939 – 29 October 1945
- Governor: Amaral Peixoto
- Preceded by: Leonina Collet
- Succeeded by: Celina Neves

Personal details
- Born: Alzira Sarmanho Vargas; 22 November 1914 São Borja, Rio Grande do Sul, Brazil
- Died: 26 January 1992 (aged 77) Rio de Janeiro, Rio de Janeiro, Brazil
- Spouse: Ernâni do Amaral Peixoto (m. 1939; died 1989)
- Children: 1
- Education: National Faculty of Law (LLB)

Alzira Vargas do Amaral Peixoto (née Sarmanho Vargas; 22 November 1914 – 26 January 1992) was the daughter of Getúlio Vargas and Darcy Vargas. She served as Chief of Staff of the Civil Cabinet of the Presidency of the Republic during her father's government, a position she assumed while she was in her final year at the Faculty of Law of Rio de Janeiro. She also worked as a librarian and an English interpreter.

== Biography ==
She was married to Ernâni do Amaral Peixoto, who served as federal interventor in Rio de Janeiro from 1937 to 1939. In 1955, Amaral Peixoto was appointed ambassador to the United States. The couple lived in the United States from 1939 to 1942 and from 1956 to 1959, during which time Amaral Peixoto served as Brazil's ambassador in Washington.

Their daughter, Celina Vargas do Amaral Peixoto, was married to Wellington Moreira Franco, who governed the state of Rio de Janeiro from 1987 to 1991.

=== Political role and legacy ===
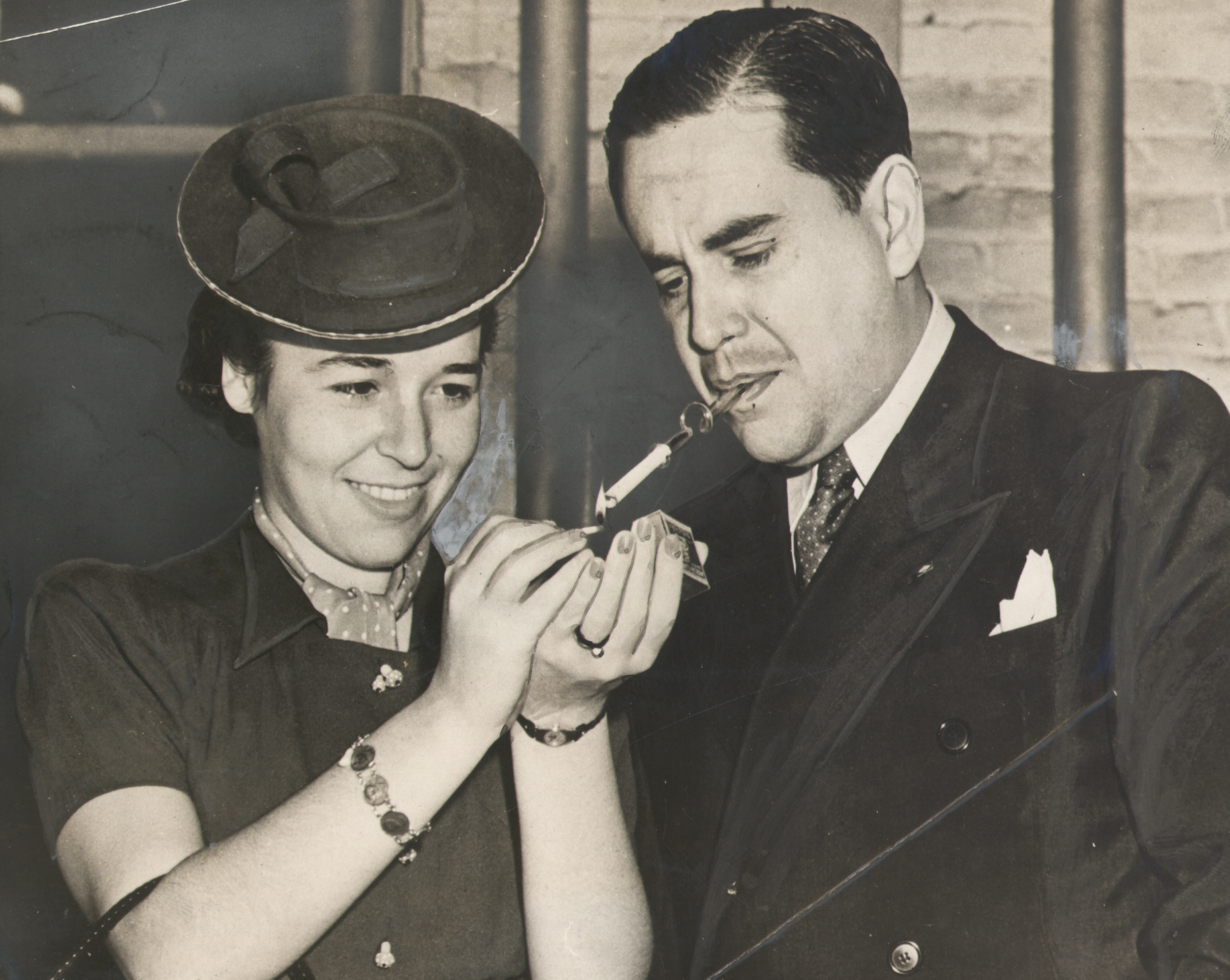
Alzira Vargas in the portrait held by the National Archives of Brazil

Although the political environment was fundamentally male-dominated, Alzira Vargas was recognized for playing an active role in shaping her father's political decisions. In particular, she remained a permanent interlocutor and analytical adviser to him, maintaining an ongoing exchange of correspondence.

She was also known as the “guardian of memory” because of her role in documenting and preserving the history and development of Getulism. Part of this documentation formed the basis of the biography Getúlio Vargas, Meu Pai (Getúlio Vargas, My Father).

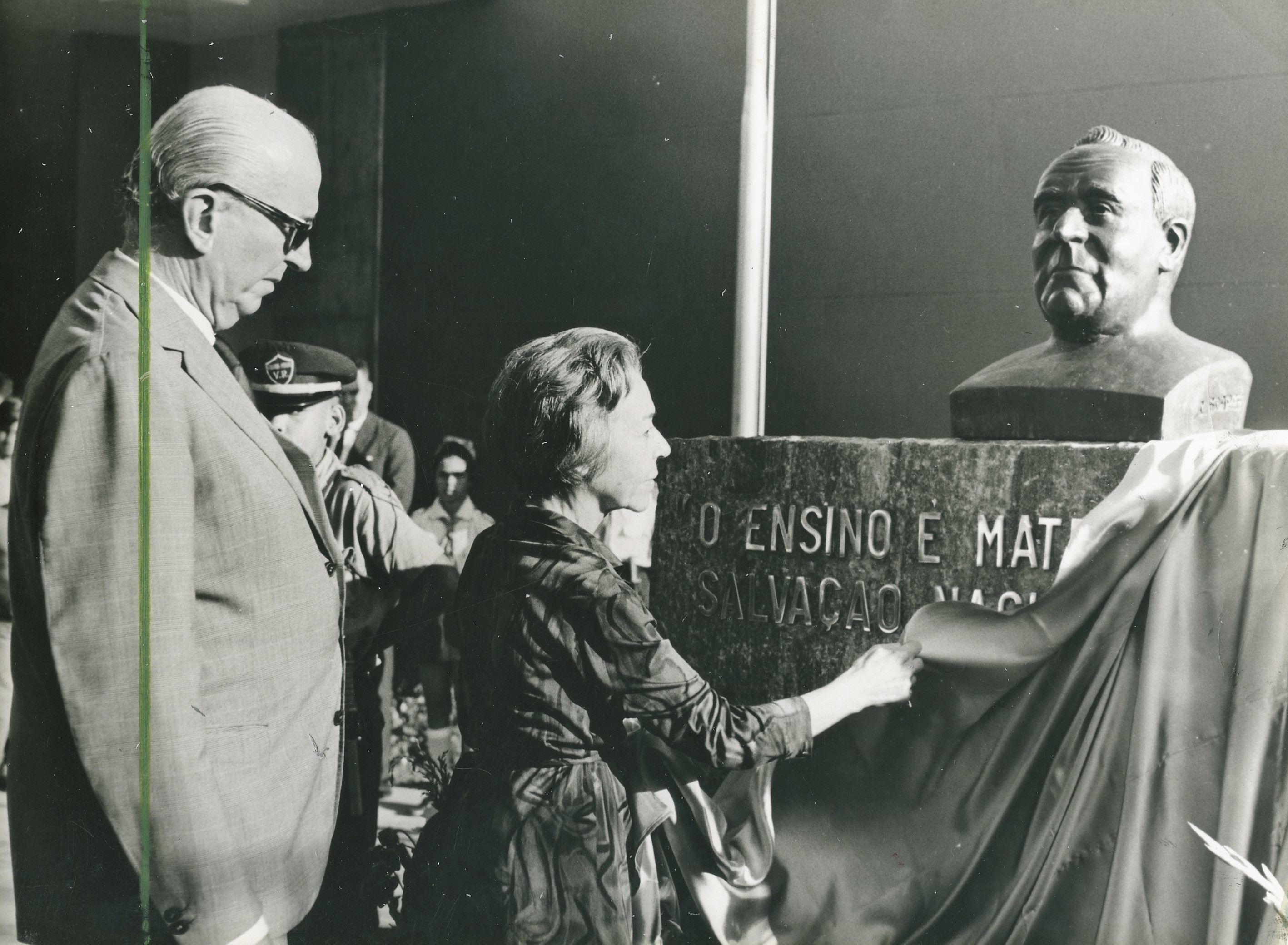
Alzira Vargas inaugurating a bust of her father, Getúlio Vargas, at Getúlio Vargas School, Volta Redonda, November 2, 1970.

In 2014, in the biographical film Getúlio, Alzira was portrayed by actress Drica Moraes.

== Published Works ==
- Getúlio Vargas, Meu Pai — Editora Globo (first edition in 1960, with several subsequent editions).
