= Maneco Vargas =

Brazilian politician (1917-1997)

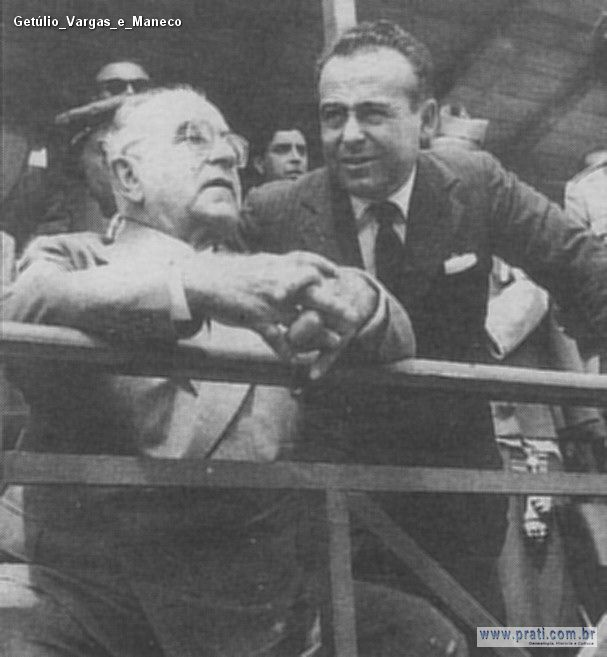
- Maneco Vargas (right) with his father Getúlio

Mayor of Porto Alegre
- In office 31 January 1955 – 3 October 1955

Personal details
- Born: Manuel Antônio Sarmanho Vargas; 17 February 1917 São Borja, Rio Grande do Sul, Brazil
- Died: 15 January 1997 (aged 79) Itaqui, Rio Grande do Sul, Brazil
- Cause of death: Suicide by gunshot
- Party: Brazilian Labour Party
- Parents: Getúlio Vargas (father); Darci Vargas (mother)

Manuel Antônio Sarmanho Vargas (17 February 1917 – 15 January 1997), better known as Maneco Vargas, was a Brazilian politician.

== Biography ==
The son of Getúlio Vargas, former president of Brazil, and his wife, Darcy Vargas, Manuel Vargas graduated as an agricultural engineer from the Luiz de Queiroz College of Agriculture in Piracicaba, in the state of São Paulo. In 1954, he married Vera Maria Silva Tavares, with whom he had four children: Yara Maria, Getúlio, Manoel Antônio, and Bettina.

In 1954, Maneco was experiencing financial difficulties because he had incurred a series of debts since entering politics. To honor his obligations, he sold two properties to Gregório Fortunato, using a bank loan arranged by the Minister of Labor, João Goulart. The revelation that a minister had guaranteed a loan at a financial institution in the name of the palace bodyguard, in order to help cover a personal debt owed by the president's son, deeply distressed Getúlio Vargas during the week of his suicide.

He was appointed Secretary of Agriculture of Rio Grande do Sul and was elected mayor of Porto Alegre in 1955, as part of Brazilian Labour Party (PTB).

He left political life to devote himself to the family estate in Itaqui, where he was found dead with a .38-caliber revolver wound to the heart. It is believed that he committed suicide. His son, Getúlio Dorneles Vargas Neto, also died by suicide by gunshot in 2017.
