= Darci Vargas =

15th and 18th First Lady of Brazil (1895–1968)

- Darci Vargas in 1940

First Lady of Brazil
- In role 31 January 1951 – 24 August 1954
- President: Getúlio Vargas
- Preceded by: Carmela Dutra
- Succeeded by: Jandira Café
- In role 3 November 1930 – 29 October 1945
- President: Getúlio Vargas
- Preceded by: Sofia Pais de Barros
- Succeeded by: Luísa Linhares

First Lady of Rio Grande do Sul
- In role 25 January 1928 – 9 October 1930
- President: Getúlio Vargas
- Preceded by: Carlinda Borges
- Succeeded by: Delminda Aranha

Personal details
- Born: Darci Lima Sarmanho; 12 December 1895 São Borja, Rio Grande do Sul, Brazil
- Died: 25 June 1968 (aged 72) Rio de Janeiro, Guanabara, Brazil
- Spouse: Getúlio Vargas (m. 1911; died 1954)
- Children: Lutero, Jandira, Alzira, Maneco and Getulinho

Darci Lima Sarmanho Vargas (12 December 1895 – 25 June 1968) was the wife of Getúlio Vargas, former President of Brazil, and the First Lady of the country during two different periods (from 1930 to 1945 and from 1951 until her husband's suicide).

Darci and Getúlio Vargas, whom she married in March 1911, had five children. However, the president was an unfaithful husband. Aimée de Heeren, later the daughter-in-law of Fernanda Wanamaker, was reported to be one of his mistresses.

She became a notable philanthropist and founded many charitable organizations.

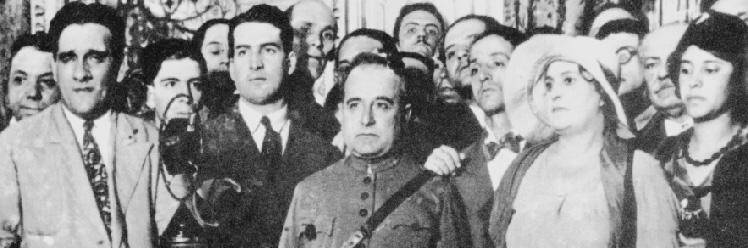
Darci (second right) and Getúlio Vargas (center; in uniform) in the Catete Palace after the Revolution of 1930.

== See also ==
- List of first ladies of Brazil
