= Getúlio Vargas =

President of Brazil (1930–1945; 1951–1954)

His Excellency Getúlio Vargas
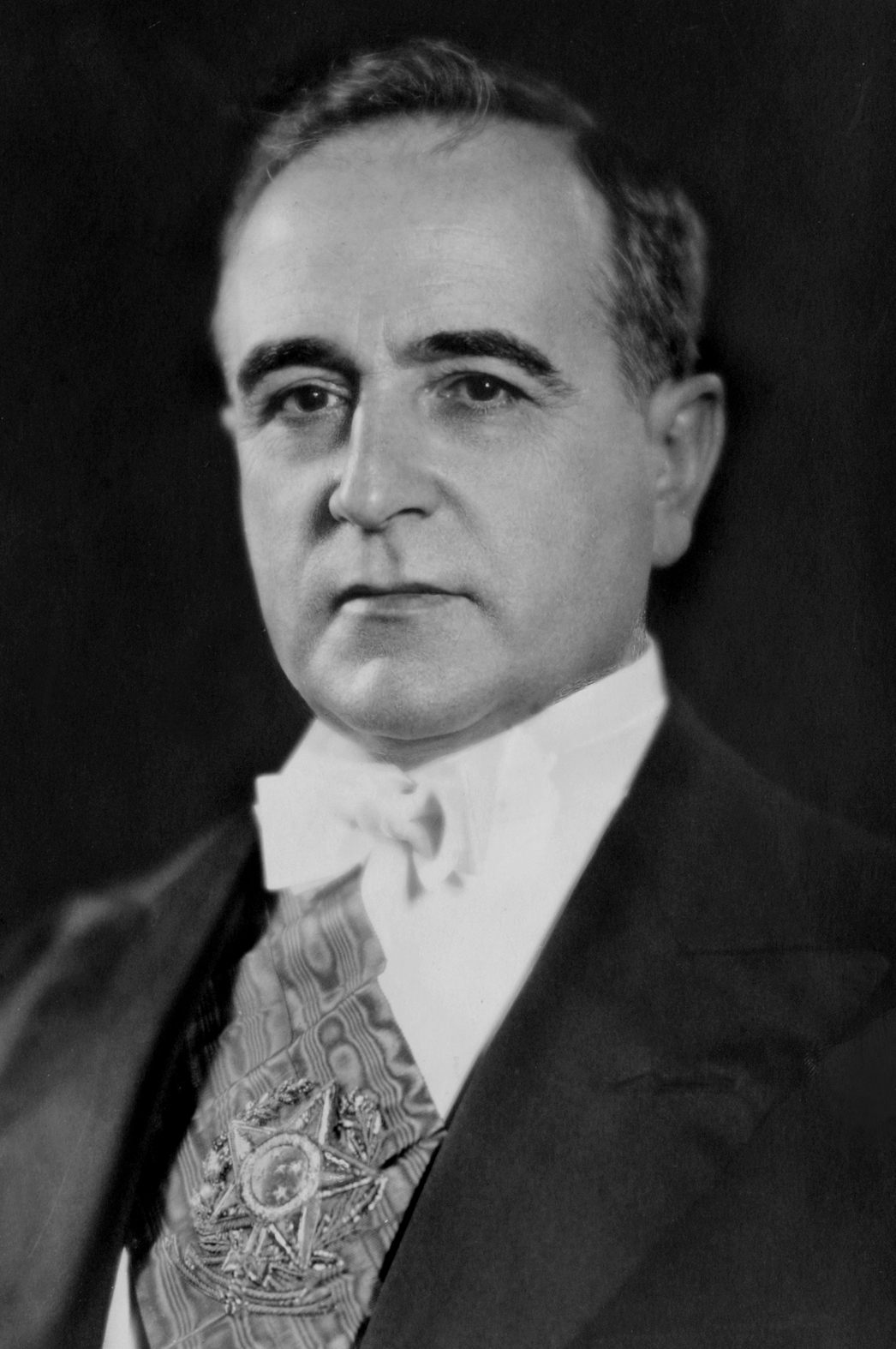
- Official portrait, 1930

14th & 17th President of Brazil
- In office 31 January 1951 – 24 August 1954
- Vice President: Café Filho
- Preceded by: Eurico Dutra
- Succeeded by: Café Filho
- In office 3 November 1930 – 29 October 1945
- Vice President: None
- Preceded by: Military Junta: Tasso Fragoso; Isaías de Noronha; Mena Barreto
- Succeeded by: José Linhares
Executive offices
President of Rio Grande do Sul
In office 25 January 1928 – 9 October 1930
Vice President	João Neves
Preceded by	Borges de Medeiros
Succeeded by	Osvaldo Aranha
Minister of Finance
In office 15 November 1926 – 17 December 1927
President	Washington Luís
Preceded by	Aníbal Freire
Succeeded by	Oliveira Botelho
Legislative offices
1946–1951	Member, Federal Senate
1923–1926	Member, Chamber of Deputies
1917–1923	Member, Legislative Assembly
1909–1913	Member, Legislative Assembly

Personal details
- Born: 19 April 1882 São Borja, Rio Grande do Sul, Empire of Brazil
- Died: 24 August 1954 (aged 72) Rio de Janeiro, Federal District, Fourth Brazilian Republic
- Cause of death: Suicide by gunshot
- Resting place: Praça XV de Novembro, São Borja
- Party: PTB (1945–1954)
- Other political affiliations: PRR (1909–1930); Independent (1930–1945)
- Spouse: Darci Sarmanho (m. 1911)
- Children: 5, including Lutero and Manuel
- Parent: Manuel do Nascimento Vargas (father)
- Education: Free Faculty of Law of Porto Alegre

Military service
- Allegiance: First Brazilian Republic
- Branch/service: Brazilian Army
- Years of service: 1898–1903; 1923
- Rank: Sergeant; Lieutenant colonel (1923)
- Unit: 6th Infantry Battalion; 25th Infantry Battalion; 7th Provisional Division
- Battles/wars: Acre War; 1923 Revolution
- Vargas's voice Speech by Vargas at the graduation of teachers from the Institute of Education; Recorded 1943

Getúlio Dornelles Vargas (Note: English: /ˈvɑːrɡəs/ VAR-gəs, Brazilian Portuguese: [ʒeˈtulju doʁˈnɛliz ˈvaʁɡɐs].) (19 April 1882 – 24 August 1954) was a Brazilian military officer, lawyer, and politician who served as the 14th and 17th president of Brazil, from 1930 to 1945 and from 1951 until his suicide in 1954. Due to his long and controversial tenure as Brazil's provisional, constitutional, dictatorial and democratic leader, he is considered by historians as the most influential Brazilian politician of the 20th century.

Born on 19 April 1882 in São Borja, Rio Grande do Sul, to a powerful local family, Vargas had a short stint in the Brazilian Army before entering law school. He began his political career as district attorney, soon becoming a state deputy prior to a brief departure from politics. After returning to the state Legislative Assembly, Vargas led troops during Rio Grande do Sul's 1923 civil war. He entered national politics as a member of the Chamber of Deputies. Afterward, Vargas served as Minister of Finance under president Washington Luís before resigning to head Rio Grande do Sul as state president, during which he had an active tenure and introduced many policies.

In 1930, after losing the presidential election, Vargas rose to power under a provisional presidency following an armed revolution, remaining until 1934 when he was elected president under a new constitution. Three years later he seized powers under the pretext of a potential communist insurrection, beginning the eight-year long Estado Novo dictatorship. In 1942, he led Brazil into World War II on the side of the Allies after being sandwiched between Nazi Germany and the United States. Though there was notable opposition to his government, the major revolts – the 1932 Constitutionalist Revolution in his provisional government, the Communist uprising of 1935 in his constitutional presidency, and the Brazilian Integralist Action's putsch in his dictatorship – were all successfully suppressed; the methods Vargas used in quelling his opposition ranged from light peace terms to jailing political opponents.

Ousted in 1945 after fifteen years in power, Vargas returned to the presidency democratically after winning the 1950 Brazilian general election. However, a growing political crisis led to his suicide in 1954, prematurely ending his second presidency.

== Early life ==
=== Family background and childhood ===
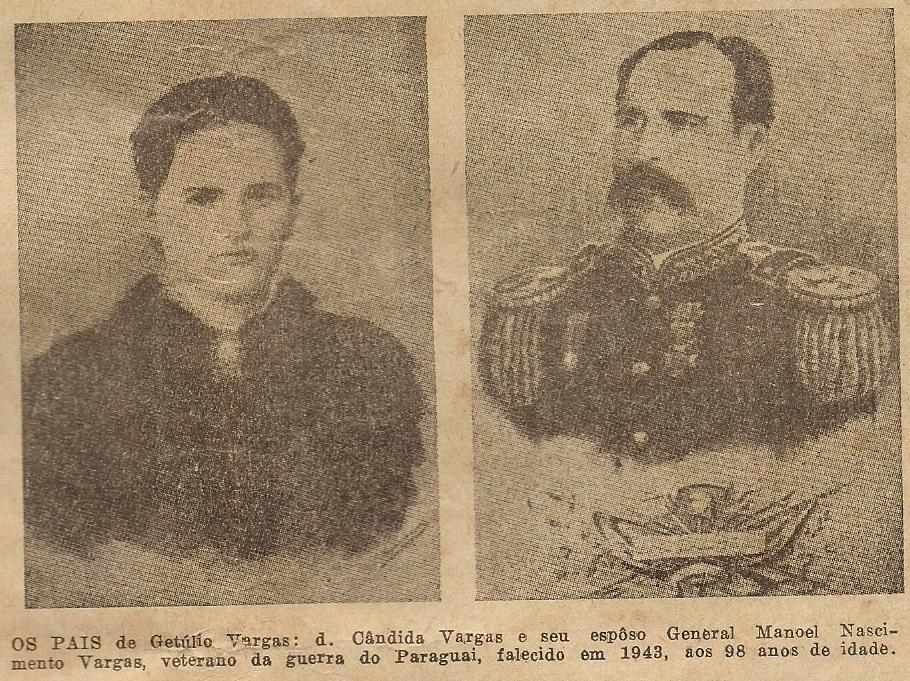
Getúlio Vargas' parents, Cândida and Manuel Vargas (O Cruzeiro magazine)

Getúlio Dornelles Vargas was born in São Borja, Rio Grande do Sul, on 19 April 1882, the third of five sons born to Manuel do Nascimento Vargas and Cândida Dornelles Vargas. (Note: Vargas was born in 1882, however, sometime in the early 20th century, he changed his birth date on all official documents to 1883. Because of this, his date of birth had become a popular misconception.) Located near Brazil's border with Argentina, the town of São Borja was a center of smuggling, political adventurism, and armed conflict, and Rio Grande do Sul was also known for an unusually violent history. The Vargas family reflected some of these characteristics. In 1919, 76 residents of São Borja complained to the state government about the Vargases' "coercive" actions, and in 1933, during Vargas's first presidency, two of his nephews were killed in a border clash.

Vargas's mother Cândida was described as being "short and fat and pleasant" by her nephew Spártaco. Her side of the family came from the Azores and included some founders of Porto Alegre, the capital of Rio Grande do Sul. Vargas's father Manuel was one of fourteen children, an honored military general for his service in the Paraguayan War, and a local Riograndense Republican Party leader. Manuel's family had a background in Azores and São Paulo. During the Federalist Revolution, Cândida's side of the family became maragatos, or federalists, while Manuel's side fought on the chimango, or republican, side. Their marriage brought together the two warring factions in the region.

Vargas had a happy childhood thanks to the respect his mother received from the town due to her position between the two political factions. Vargas studied at a private primary school in São Borja run by Francisco Braga. He did not finish, however, for Vargas was sent to the Ouro Preto Preparatory School in Minas Gerais. The invitation was at the request of his brothers, and Vargas traveled by boat from Buenos Aires in Argentina, rushing as quickly as possible overland due to a yellow fever outbreak in Rio de Janeiro. At the school, Vargas was the subject of hostility by his fellow cadets, taunted with the nickname xuxu, or chayote, for his height (1.57 m or 5 ft 2 in) and "round shape". Vargas and his elder brothers were forced out of the school after Vargas's brother Viriato, with the aid of his brother Protasio, shot fellow cadet Carlos Prado to death.

=== Military career and law school ===
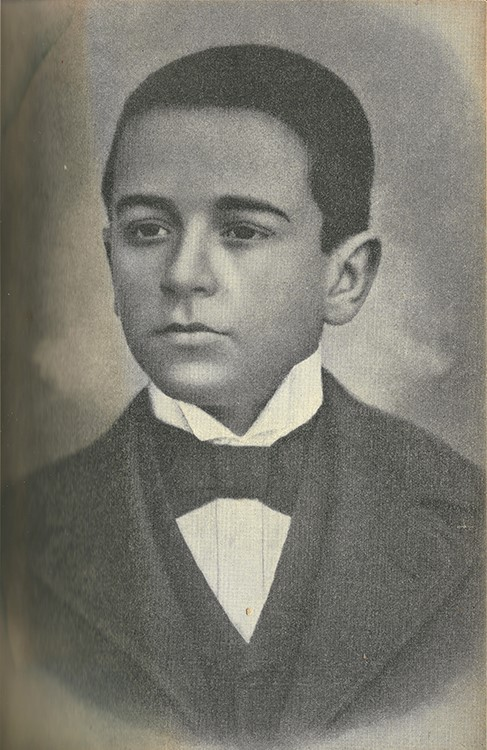
Vargas at age 12, c. 1894

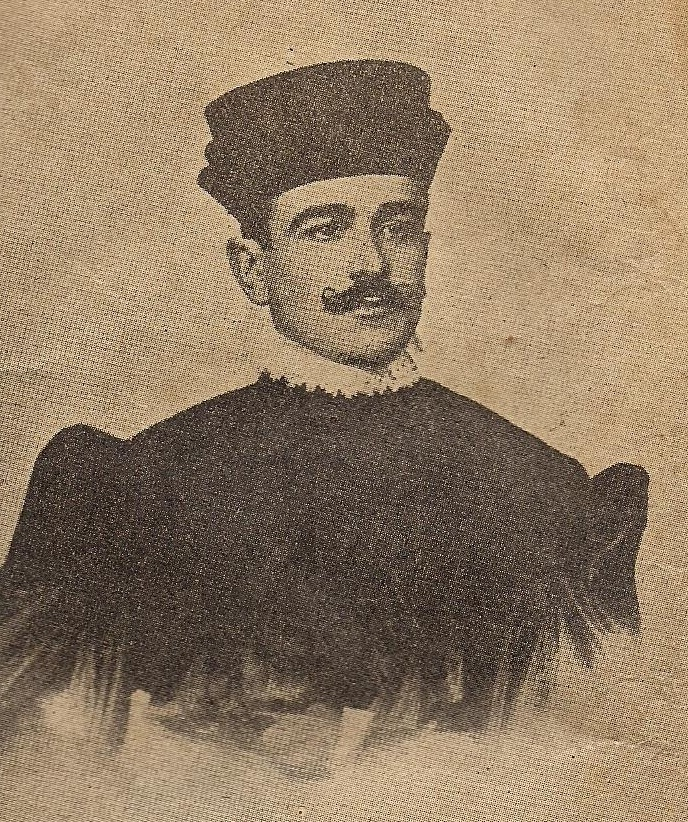
Vargas's graduation photo, 1907

Like his father, Vargas embarked on a military career. He joined the army in 1898 despite his father's protests, enlisting as a private in the 6th Infantry Battalion for one year. In 1899, he was promoted to sergeant. He also joined the military college at Rio Pardo and studied there until 1901. However, Vargas and twenty other cadets were forced to leave when they joined in a protest over lack of water. Only some time later did an amnesty allow him and the others to return. Still having time to serve, Vargas was then transferred to Porto Alegre and joined the 25th Infantry Battalion.

He tried leaving to enroll in law school, but his discharge was delayed due to a medical examination that was required. Coincidentally, Vargas was sent to Corumbá in what was then Mato Grosso before his examination was conducted when a border crisis broke out between Bolivia and Brazil in February 1903. The disillusioned Vargas did not have to fight as the dispute was settled before he arrived, later saying that living under difficult conditions allowed him to learn to judge others, though he was disappointed from being kept idle and non-combatant. He asked for a discharge once again, and was able to obtain paperwork falsely stating he had had epilepsy.

Vargas was admitted to the law school at Porto Alegre and adapted easily to the elitist climate among students. He became active in the students' republican faction and served as an editor and profile writer for the school's newspaper, O Debate (The Debate). Vargas and his friends were also influenced by the late politician Júlio de Castilhos, creating the Bloco Acadêmico Castilhista (Castilho's Academic Block) to keep his ideas alive after his death.

During his time at the school, Vargas was appointed the valedictorian of his class and stayed in a series of fraternity-like boarding houses, in one of which he made connections with future president and collaborator Eurico Gaspar Dutra. Vargas also spoke to visiting president Afonso Pena as a student representative in August 1906, saying, "We are today simply spectators of the present, but we will be judges of the future… Democracy is the common aspiration of civili[z]ed peoples as to their political system, but only with education can we have a people truly capable of democratic government." Vargas graduated in 1907.

== Early career ==
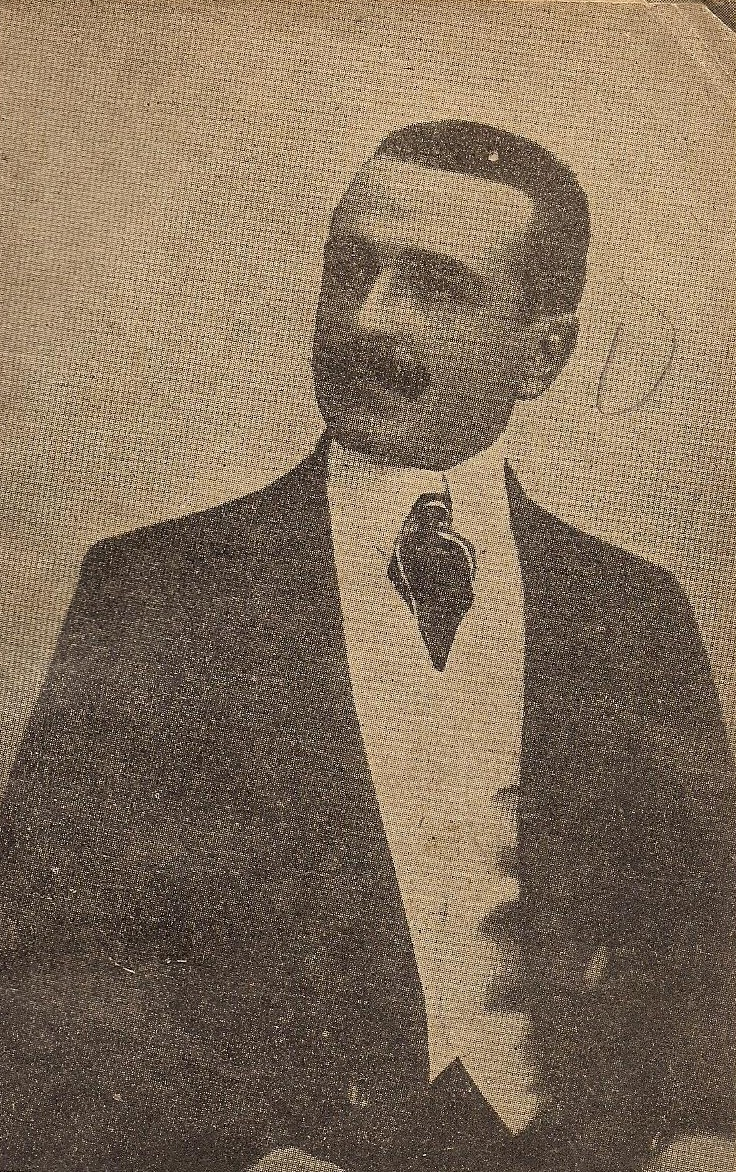
Vargas aged 27 in 1909

=== Attorney and state deputy ===
Entering politics in the Republican Party of Rio Grande do Sul, Vargas had two options after graduating from law school: He could either accept an instructorship position in the school he had just graduated from, or he could become the state attorney. Vargas chose the latter, a position that was secured by his father, and he was named the Rio Grande do Sul state attorney general by his party. While it was very apparent that Vargas received the position due to his political connections, he remained as state attorney until 1908.

Vargas would gain valuable experience as state attorney, and, after building himself a reputation for loyalty and brightness, was elected to the Legislative Assembly of Rio Grande do Sul in 1909. Though he was only in his twenties, he still managed to make himself known for the ability to temporize and became well-liked. However, the Legislative Assembly only convened for two months in a year and pay was allotted, meaning that Vargas needed to find other income sources. This was partially because of the downgraded importance of state legislators in Rio Grande do Sul in sharp contrast to other states. Believing São Borja could not support more than one advocate's office, Vargas began his legal career as a promotor, or a public prosecutor, in Porto Alegre. Vargas's first case dealt with rape, one which he settled privately by convincing both parties to marry.

=== Personal life and interim ===
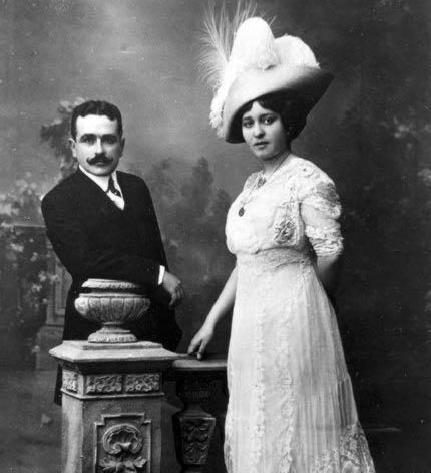
Vargas and his wife Darci in June 1911, a few months after they married.

Vargas's vocation as a prosecutor did not last long, for he married fifteen-year-old Darci Lima Sarmanho, (Note: Darci Lima Sarmanho's name is also spelled Darcy Lima Sarmanho.) a woman thirteen years younger than himself, in March 1911. They would remain together for forty-three years until Vargas died in 1954. She was the daughter of Antonio Sarmanho, a merchant, farmer, and one of Manuel's closest friends, and was orphaned at age fourteen. According to historian Robert M. Levine, Darci stayed in the background for most of Vargas's life and looked after the family's households. She also devoted herself to public charity causes later in their lives when Vargas would become president.

They had five children together: Lutero, Jandira, Alzira, Manuel (also known as Maneco), and Getúlio (also known as Getulinho). Alzira would go on to become a law school graduate and became Vargas's favorite. However, Vargas was an unfaithful husband, often participating in sexual dalliances. He took a mistress in 1937 and become devoted to her; this was later confirmed by his diaries published fifty years after his death in 2004. It is believed the mistress was Aimée de Soto-Maior, later Aimée de Heeren, recognized by the international fashion press as one of the world's most glamorous and beautiful women. Heeren neither confirmed nor denied the rumor.

Manuel gave Vargas some land near his own, and money to set up a home and legal practice in São Borja. The combination of a political and legal profession was common in Latin America. Vargas was now a conciliator and advisor, taking on many cases dealing with a social factor, an experience that can be considered a component of his later social reform. Between 1913 and 1917, Vargas's political career ceased, however. While the second term of president Borges de Medeiros was underway, Vargas fell out with the state president at the end of 1912. Commenting on his resignation speech to the Assembly, historian Richard Bourne states, "Get[ú]lio's departure was marked with finesse: he made just enough noise to indicate to the gaucho boss that he was not to be treated lightly, and not such a dramatic ruction as to make a later composition impossible."

== Political rise ==
=== Return as a legislator and the 1923 civil war ===
Medeiros still needed the powerful Vargases' support, however. Near the end of 1916, Vargas refused an offer from Medeiros to become the state's police chief, opting instead to successfully run for reelection as a state deputy and would remain for two terms. Throughout his renewed tenure, he was, satirically, described as the "mathematician of the party" and named party (or majority) leader. While tasked with the crucial responsibility of ensuring the reelection of Medeiros, Vargas was also chairman of an Assembly commission dedicated to verifying election results for the state presidency, or, as his opposition put it, partaking in electoral fraud. In the latter part of his term, Vargas was in charge of leading and reporting the budget.

During the 1923 civil war in Rio Grande do Sul, Vargas was called upon to lead a military unit with Republicans. He would organize the Seventh Provisional Division, and, when Republicans Oswaldo Aranha and José Antonio Flores da Cunha were under siege by Liberationists, led two-hundred-fifty provisórios as lieutenant colonel, marching one hundred miles at night to Uruguaiana to "defend the ideas of his party". Halfway there at Itaqui, he found the railway cut and an absence of mounts for his horsemen. According to Aranha's brother Adalberto, Vargas was persistent, decisive, and speedy throughout the crisis. He ordered his forces out of the town and the embarkation of his troops on requisitioned river barges. Vargas also ignored low water warnings to save the detrimental situation the Republicans had gotten themselves into. He said, "I will send them all to arrive there in time. Only the impossible will deter me from coming to the help of my comrades."

Before he could command any real action, president Medeiros messaged Vargas to hand over the military as he had been named federal deputy, a vacant seat he ran for in 1922, and deputies could only command troops with the permission of the National Congress. Vargas turned his command over to his cousin Deoclecio Dorneles Motta, immediately departed for Rio de Janeiro, and now held a far more important task – restoring the power of Rio Grande do Sul in federal politics.

=== National politics ===
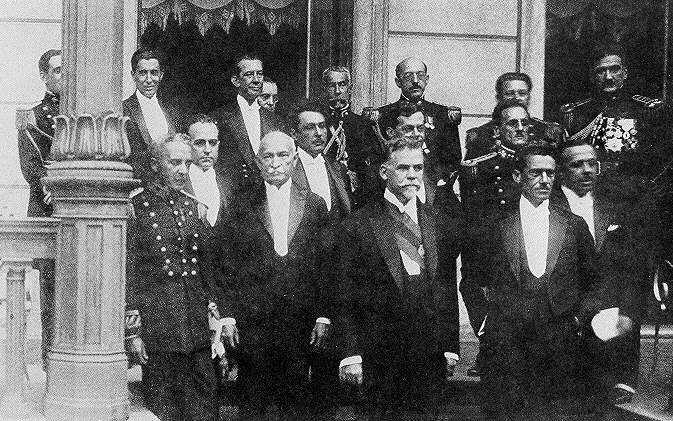
President Washington Luís with members of his cabinet in 1926. Vargas, Minister of Finance, can be seen in the second row, first from left.

In May 1923, Vargas became a national deputy, becoming Medeiros' "man of confidence" during a troubling period. His objective was to diminish federal intervention in the state civil war and gave a speech stating the state government had the situation under control. In reality, there was doubt this statement was true and Medeiros had had to raise private loans in Uruguay to pay for war expenses. Vargas also had to lead his bloc of Rio Grande do Sul congressmen, demoralized after an editorial appeared in Porto Alegre calling for the acceptance of the incoming Artur Bernardes administration. In 1924, Vargas became the official leader of the Rio Grande do Sul congressional delegation, the same year he was forced to take his daughter Alzira out of school in November after a warship opened fire on Rio de Janeiro as part of the tenente rebellions. According to Levine, Vargas' "most noteworthy achievement as a congressman came in 1925, when as a member of a commission studying constitutional reform he advocated greater government authority."

With the knowledge that a São Paulo native would succeed Bernardes, Vargas cultivated the São Paulo delegation during Bernardes' presidency. When Washington Luís (Note: Washington Luís's name is also spelled Washington Luíz.) was elected president in 1926, he chose Vargas to become his Minister of Finance. This was despite the fact Vargas had virtually no fiscal experience, even going as far as to deny joining a finance committee when he was in Congress. The appointment was based on gratitude toward Medeiros for helping him become president and a political deal as part of the many cabinet positions divided amongst important states.

Though the economy was prosperous from 1926 to 1928, it was entirely based upon coffee. Within a month, Vargas had submitted a money reform bill to the National Congress, similar to the French Poincaré, with the objective of stabilizing the value of the Brazilian currency. It saw initial success before collapsing in the wake of the Wall Street crash of 1929. Vargas introduced a tax on consumption with the purpose of undermining the country's dependency on customs revenues. He would also hold audiences where up to a hundred people could submit their petitions, requests, and complaints, ranging from ordinary citizens to congressmen. Although Vargas only served two years as Finance Minister before returning to Rio Grande do Sul to become the president (governor) in 1928, he gained valuable recognition and experience on a national level.

=== President of Rio Grande do Sul ===
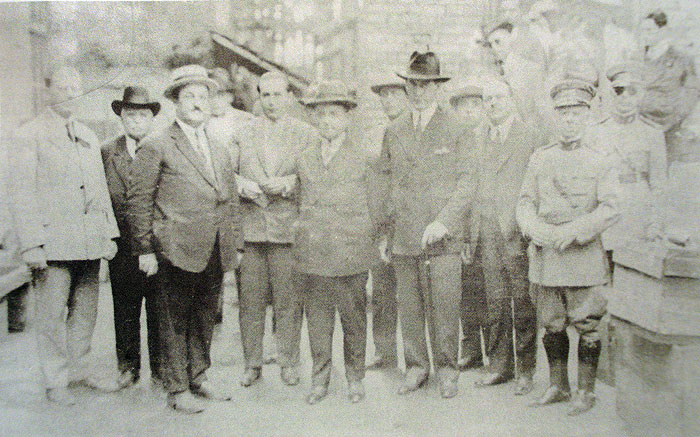
Vargas visiting Caxias do Sul, 1928

In 1928, Medeiros was to complete his lengthy tenure and depart from the presidency of Rio Grande do Sul. Vargas, meanwhile, looked on with caution, so far as to prevent a journalist from writing about Vargas's audiences in Diario de Noticias back in Porto Alegre, believing it would pass off as an attempt for the presidency. Acknowledging Medeiros's autocratic philosophy was the reason for this; a successor was in Medeiros's control and he could have vetoed any nomination. Despite this, Vargas had many beneficial factors on his side: Medeiros's debt, his national achievements, his distancing from intrastate quarrels, his popularity amongst party youth such as Aranha, and his ability to mediate difficult situations. Medeiros selected Vargas as his successor, followed by Vargas's resignation from Luís's cabinet in late 1927. With the lack of an opposition and the Republican political machine, Vargas's election was assured and he became the president of the state with his term set to expire in 1932.

Vargas was active throughout his two-year tenure. In one instance, he vetoed dishonest election results which favored his political party. In another, he negotiated a ceasefire between his state's two warring factions and successfully ended decades of hostility. With that, he also made peace with other groups in the state, such as making concessions to Liberationists. Levine states, "As governor, Vargas achieved bipartisan support for his government, for the first time in generations." Along with Aranha, who carried out his economic program, he provided credit to cattle ranchers and created interventionist cooperatives to bring in resources and lower export prices for agriculture. Vargas established the Banco do Rio Grande do Sul (Bank of Rio Grande do Sul) to lend money to farmers and touched upon education, mining, agriculture, and roads. The people rallied around him as Vargas promoted the planting of wheat and created a department of agriculture. Vargas doubled the amount of primary schools in the state, oversaw the construction of bridges and roads, and revisited the railroad contract between Rio Grande do Sul and the federal government in order to favor the state. Despite that, he remained loyal to Luís's administration and maintained ties to the federal government. Vargas also championed the VARIG airline, and improved law courts.

== Rise to the presidency (1930) ==
=== 1930 presidential nomination and campaign ===
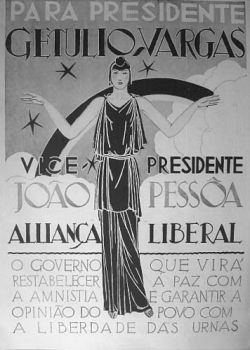
Campaign poster for Vargas and his running mate João Pessoa, 1929

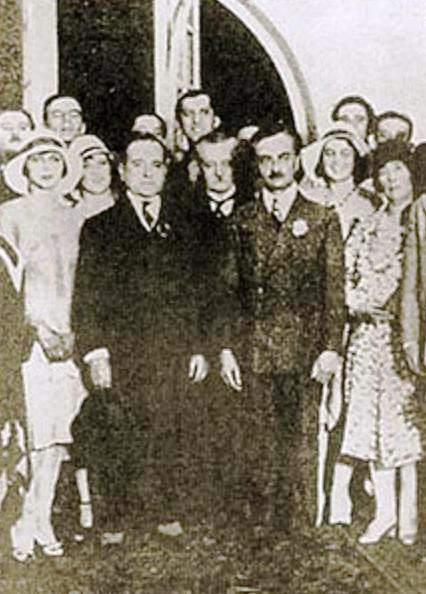
Vargas and Pessoa stand together, sometime before July 1930

Throughout much of the First (or Old) Republic (1889–1930), Brazilian politics were consolidated in an oligarchic alliance known as coffee with milk politics (also referred to as coffee and cream). This alliance joined politicians from the dominant states of São Paulo and Minas Gerais. Starting in the 1910s, there was much discontent with the Republic, including a general strike in 1917, and several failed tenente revolts of discontent junior military officers throughout the 1920s. World coffee prices crashed in October 1929 and, with them, the Brazilian economy. In the midst of unrest and the collapse of the economy, president Luís broke the coffee and milk agreement, declaring Júlio Prestes (a politician from São Paulo) his successor instead of a person from Minas Gerais, violating the four-decade old oligarchy. Vargas publicly announced his views on the Old Republic in a proclamation on 4 October 1930:

The people are starving and oppressed. Representative government has been destroyed by the oligarchies and the professional politicians. Brutality, violence and squandering of public funds is seen at every level of Brazilian national politics.…

The ensuing political crisis of Luís choosing a paulista to succeed him led to the formation of the Liberal Alliance (Aliança Liberal) (consisting of Minas Gerais, Rio Grande do Sul and Paraíba), forming an opposition to Prestes and nominating Vargas, who led a broad coalition of middle-class industrialists, planters from outside São Paulo, and the tenentes for the presidency. Support for Vargas was especially strong in the states of the alliance. During the campaign, Vargas had also been careful not to offend planter landowners, though he did advocate moderate social reform and economic nationalism. The Liberal Alliance, amongst other social issues, pushed for agricultural schools, industrial training centres, sanitation to the countryside, establishing workers' vacations and a minimum wage, political reforms, individuals' freedom, and consumer co-operatives, the majority of which Vargas would go on to install in the Brazilian economy.

=== Revolution of 1930 ===
Much to the distaste of the opposition, Júlio Prestes was declared winner of the 1930 election. This, however, did not go without many claims of electoral fraud, though fraud was committed on both sides. Electoral machines produced votes in all Brazilian states, including Rio Grande do Sul, where Vargas won 298,627 votes to 982. Although many in the opposition considered orchestrating a coup following the results, Vargas claimed that they did not have enough power to dispute the election successfully. It seemed the planned coup would not be executed. However, in the wake of the assassination of João Pessoa, Vargas's running mate, for romantic reasons, the opposition decided it was ultimately time to take up arms, and Vargas agreed.

Although the president was elected in March, he wasn't to be sworn in until November, leaving time for Luís to transition power to the president-elect, Prestes. Alongside his co-conspirators, Vargas planned to overthrow the federal government in an armed revolution, though he was notably anxious about his role in the Revolution. He wrote as the first entry in his diary:

The most pacific of men, a strong believer of government, law and order, starting a revolution!

— Getulio Dornelles Vargas, first entry of his diary

This revolution, known as the Revolution of 1930, began on 3 October in Porto Alegre and Belo Horizonte. Railway workers went on strike. In Recife, the capital of Pernambuco, citizens invaded government buildings, seized an arsenal, and wrecked a telephone station. Revolutionaries quickly took control of the Northeast, and a large military confrontation in São Paulo seemed imminent. This, however, never happened, as Luís resigned on 24 October 1930, at the urging of both the military and Cardinal Dom Sebastião Leme. A short-lived junta of Brazil's military leaders took charge of the government.

Revolutionary leaders, surprised at the ousting of the president, were concerned as it had been done without previous notice to the revolutionaries. Vargas went by train to São Paulo and continued toward Rio de Janeiro (then the nation's capital), and telegraphed to the junta on 24 October 1930:

I am on the São Paulo border with thirty thousand men perfectly armed and acting in combination with the states of Rio Grande do Sul, Paraná, Santa Catarina, Minas Gerais and the north, not to depose Washington Luis, but to realise the program of the revolution... I am merely a transitory expression of the collective will. Members of the junta of Rio de Janeiro will be accepted as collaborators but not directors, since these elements joined the revolution at the time when its success was assured. Under these conditions, I will enter with the southern forces into the state of São Paulo, which will be occupied by troops I can trust. We will arrange the trip to Rio [de Janeiro] later. It is unnecessary for me to say that the march upon São Paulo and the subsequent military occupation is merely to guarantee military order. We have no desire to antagonise or humiliate our brothers from this state, who deserve only our esteem and appreciation. Before beginning our march for São Paulo tomorrow I want to hear any proposals that the junta may wish to make.

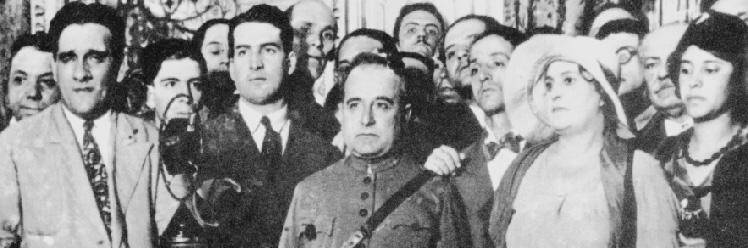
Vargas (center) and his wife (right) arriving in Rio de Janeiro

Vargas arrived in Rio de Janeiro in a uniform and wide-brimmed pampa hat, with 3,000 soldiers in the city in preparation of his arrival. The junta withdrew from power and installed Vargas as "interim president" on 3 November 1930.

== Provisional and constitutional governments (1930–1937) ==
=== Establishment of the Provisional Government ===
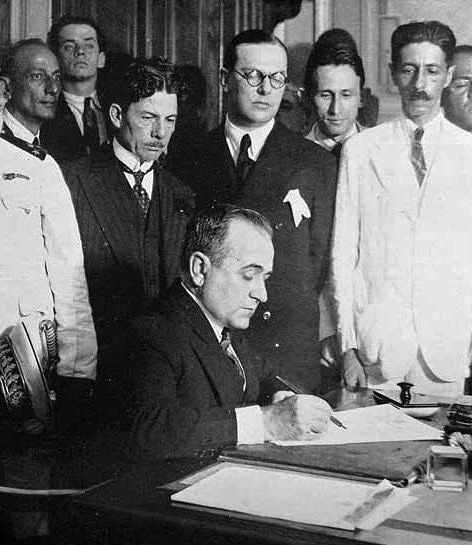
Vargas with members of his cabinet on inauguration day, 3 November 1930

Vargas's provisional presidency began on 3 November 1930, when he assumed "unlimited power" from the provisional government in the aftermath of the Revolution of 1930, and gave a speech detailing a 17-point program. (Note: The provisional presidency of Vargas has also been described as a dictatorship by its critics. See Bourne 1974 and Hudson 1997.) He imprisoned his prominent political opponents, and instead of taking the "constitutional solution", where Vargas would act within the boundaries of the 1891 constitution and he would be declared victor of the 1930 election, Vargas chose the "revolutionary solution" and assumed emergency powers with a provisional government as he had told Aranha from Ponta Grossa. Even amongst the poorest of Brazilians, Vargas had brought hope to them, something which drove him to oblige to his goals. For now, the Brazilian people lived under a regime lacking political parties and one which governed by decree, which they accepted. Vargas also held sympathies for a corporatist state.

The old political formula, stressing the rights of man, appears to be decadent. Instead of individualism, synonym for an excess of liberty, and of communism, a new mentality for slavery, the perfect co-ordination of all initiatives should prevail, circumscribed within the orbit of the State; and class organisations should be recognised as collaborators in public administration.

— Getúlio Vargas

Through his provisional government, it was apparent that Vargas was attempting to centralize his power. After dissolving state and municipal legislatures as well as the National Congress, Vargas assumed all policymaking power of the legislative and executive branches and the ability to name and dismiss public officials at will, though the judiciary branch was allowed to remain with modification on all levels of government. Ensuring his support, Vargas also named federal "intervenors" to administer the Brazilian states and replace presidents (governors), with the only exception being Minas Gerais, where the president was allowed to remain as intervenor. Nearly all these actions were perscribed in a single decree on 11 November 1930.

=== Coffee policy ===
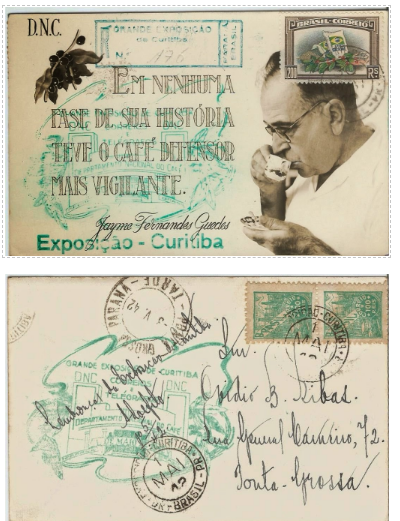
Vargas sips coffee on a commemorative postcard of an exhibition of the National Coffee Department. This was taken much later in his first presidency (1942).

Since the beginning of the Great Depression, there was no longer any demand for Brazil's agricultural production. Planters found financial ruin, unemployment in cities grew, foreign revenue declined, and convertible money was no longer in circulation. For instance, the price of coffee was 22.5 cents per pound in 1929, but this plummeted to a mere eight cents in 1931. Though Vargas promoted the diversification of agriculture, especially with cotton, he also recognized that he could not abandon the coffee sector, which Brazil was highly dependent upon. Therefore, the Vargas government took measures to address the sector's financial ruin. On 10 February 1933, Vargas created the National Coffee Department (DNC) (Departamento Nacional do Café), and in March 1931, Vargas issued a decree which barred imports of machinery for industries suffering from overproduction.

Still, Vargas's government was faced with a major problem: Large stocks of coffee had no demand on the international market. In July 1931, the government, using the money it received via export taxes and exchange taxes, would purchase excess coffee and destroy some of it. Doing such, the price of coffee would be sustained and the supply would be reduced. The plan lasted many years, only ending in 1944. By that point, Vargas's government had destroyed 78,200,000 sacks of coffee, equivalent to the world's consumption for three years.

=== Labor policy ===
According to historians Boris and Sergio Fausto, "One of the more coherent aspects of the Vargas administration was its labor policy. Between 1930 and 1945, it passed through several stages, but from the beginning it appeared as innovative as far as what preceded it was concerned. Its main objectives were to repress efforts of the urban working class to organize outside the aegis of the state and to incorporate the working class into the government's array of supporters." To achieve these goals, Vargas, notably, created the Ministry of Labor, Industry, and Commerce (Note: Originally the Ministry of Labor founded in November 1930. In February 1931, it was expanded to the Ministry of Labor, Industry, and Commerce.) in November 1930, nominating Lindolfo Collor as the first Minister of Labor. Laws were passed to protect workers, a March 1931 decree brought unions into line, and Vargas's government established the Bureaus of Reconciliation and Arbitration (Juntas de Conciliação e Julgamento) to mediate worker-boss affairs. To protect the rights of Brazilian workers, the government limited immigration and required that at least two-thirds of all workers at any given factory be Brazilian. The president gained considerable support from organized labor with his government beginning construction on long-promised workers' housing in Rio de Janeiro and São Paulo, despite it being under par compared to the needs of the growing population. He also began taking repressive measures toward leftist organizations in respect to the economy, particularly the Brazilian Communist Party.

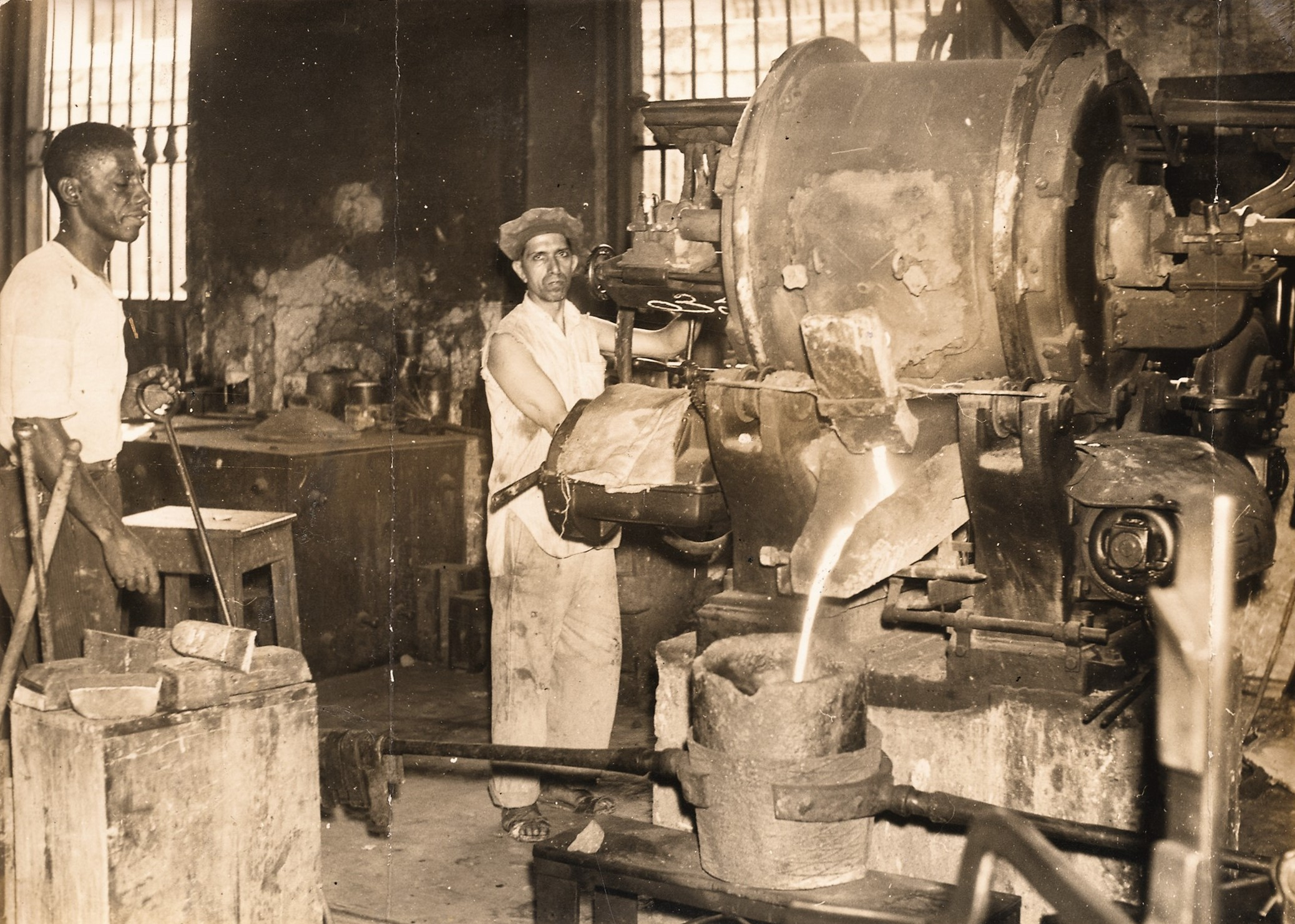
A Brazilian factory in 1938, during Vargas's dictatorship

The economic regulations Vargas imposed, however, were still being circumvented as late as 1941. While it was impossible for the minimum wage laws to be evaded by large businesses or in large towns, the minimum rural salary of 1943 was, in many cases, simply not abided by employers. In fact, many social policies never extended to rural areas. While each state varied, social legislation was enforced less by the government and more by the good will of employers and officials in the remote regions of Brazil.

Vargas's legislation did more for the industrial workers than for the more numerous agricultural workers, despite the fact that only relatively few industrial workers joined the unions that the government encouraged. The state-run social security system was inefficient and the Institute for Retirement and Social Welfare produced few results. The popular backlash due to these shortcomings was evidenced by the rising popularity of the National Liberation Alliance, a leftist front, in 1935. Moreover, the Faustos state that, "The nation's financial situation became untenable halfway through 1931." Payments on Brazil's foreign debt ceased in September of the same year, and the Bank of Brazil had once more been granted sole permission to exchange currency, a measure that had originally been put in place by president Luís's government yet repealed by Vargas's provisional government.

=== Religion and education ===
Brazil had had a close cooperation between the Church and state by the time Vargas assumed power. The collaboration began mostly in the 1920s under the administration of Artur Bernardes. Vargas now made the relationship much closer, evident in the unveiling of the statue of Christ the Redeemer on 12 October 1931. Vargas and his ministers were present at the unveiling, and Cardinal Leme, who was influential in the ousting of president Luís, declared Brazil as "the most holy heart of Jesus, whom it recognized as its King and Lord."

Vargas's government took special measures in favor of the church, and the church received support for the new government from the majority of Brazil's Catholics. In April 1931, a decree allowed religion to be taught in public schools. This was all despite the fact that Vargas was firmly agnostic (though Darci practiced Roman Catholicism), going as far as to name his first son Lutero, an un-Catholic name. His purpose for the union between the church and state was to build popular support for his government through the channeling of religious feelings toward the state, though.

Hoping to tackle the issue of education as well, Vargas's government immediately introduced new measures to improve what was perceived as a problem in Brazil. Like religion, reform was tried in the 1920s at first, beginning at the state level. However, Vargas's new government sought to centralize education, creating the Ministry of Education and Health in November 1930. The initiatives were based on "authoritarianism" and a hybrid between hierarchical values and Catholic conservatism, though it was never considered "fascist indoctrination". Major reforms also took hold in higher education, with Vargas's government creating conditions favorable to universities.

Vargas's reforms were limited, however. Though his laws were in existence, the enforcement of those laws was lackluster. In 1948, Anísio Teixeira, considered to be Brazil's greatest education reformer, reviewed the education reform done in the state of Bahia after twenty years (1928–1948). On 16 April 1948, Teixeira gave a speech in the capital, Salvador:

Most of the state's educational efforts are performed by a cadre of primary schoolteachers centered in cities or dispersed throughout the interior, where in almost all cases there are no school buildings, only makeshift classrooms, and virtually no teaching materials. There are few state-funded secondary schools in Bahia, which lamentably is disorganized and congested, and only three institutions to train elementary-level teachers. Only one of them has adequate facilities. In spite of the strangulation and humiliation, there are still noble examples of teachers' devotion and persistence.

Vargas and religion
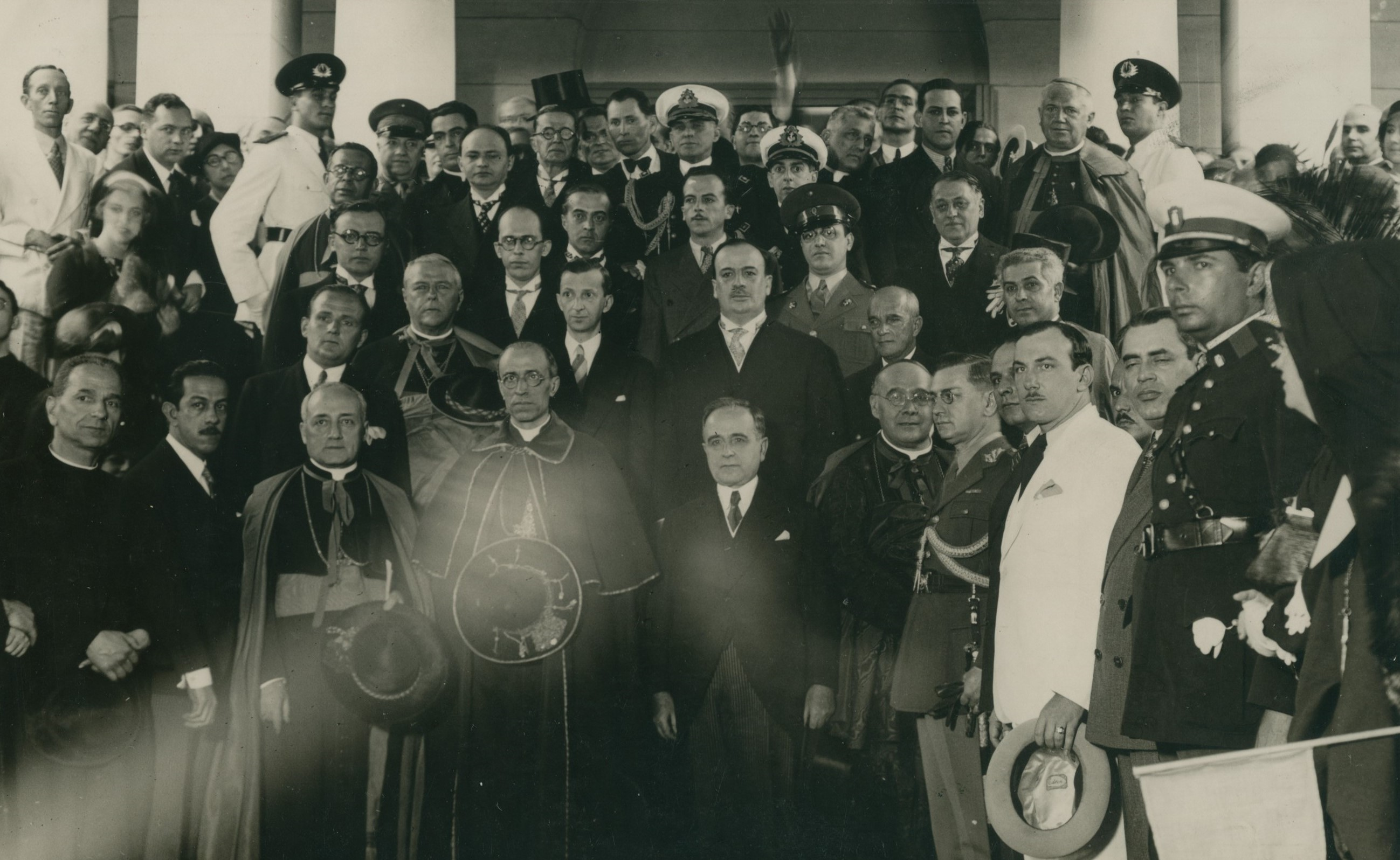
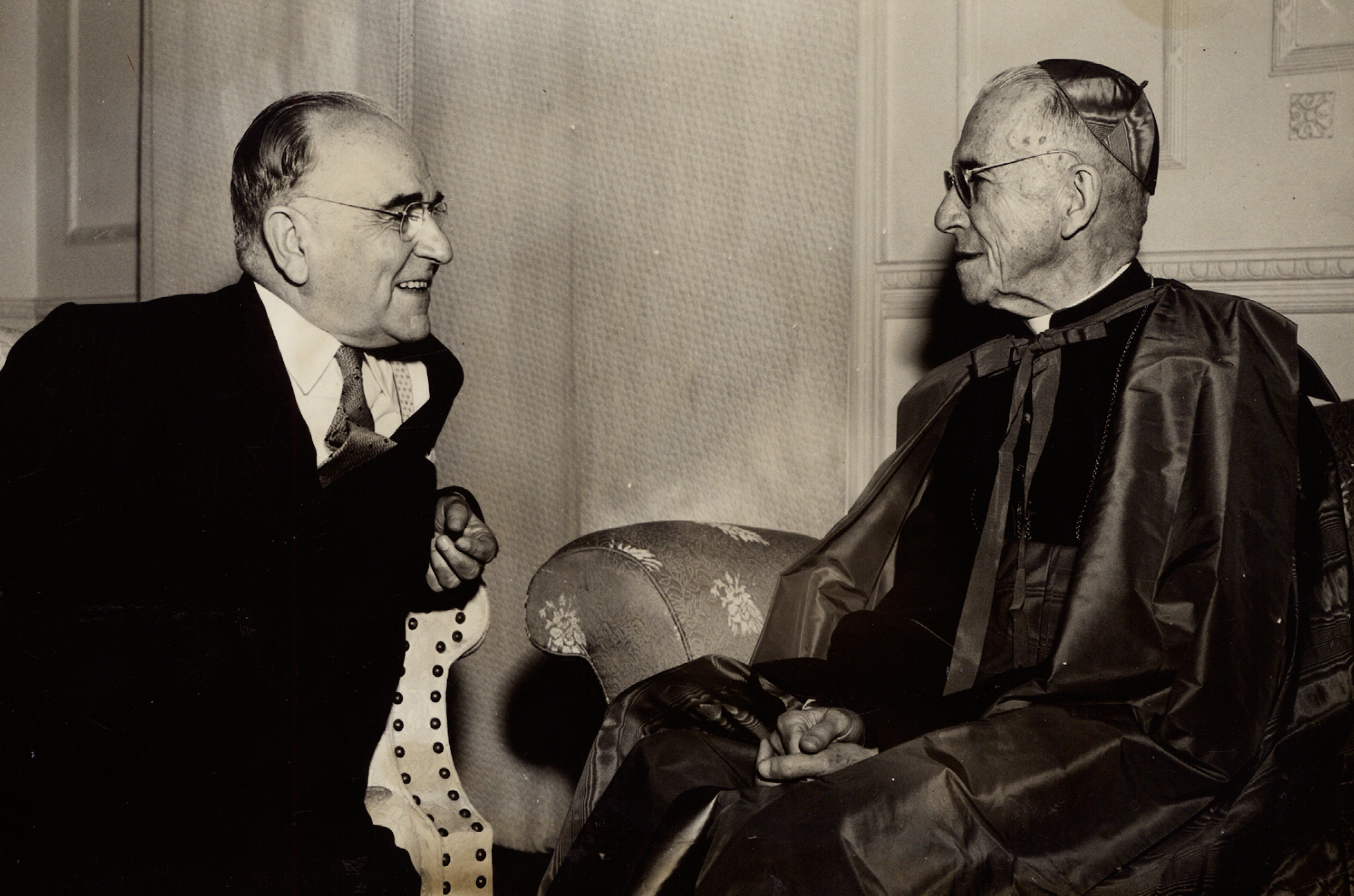
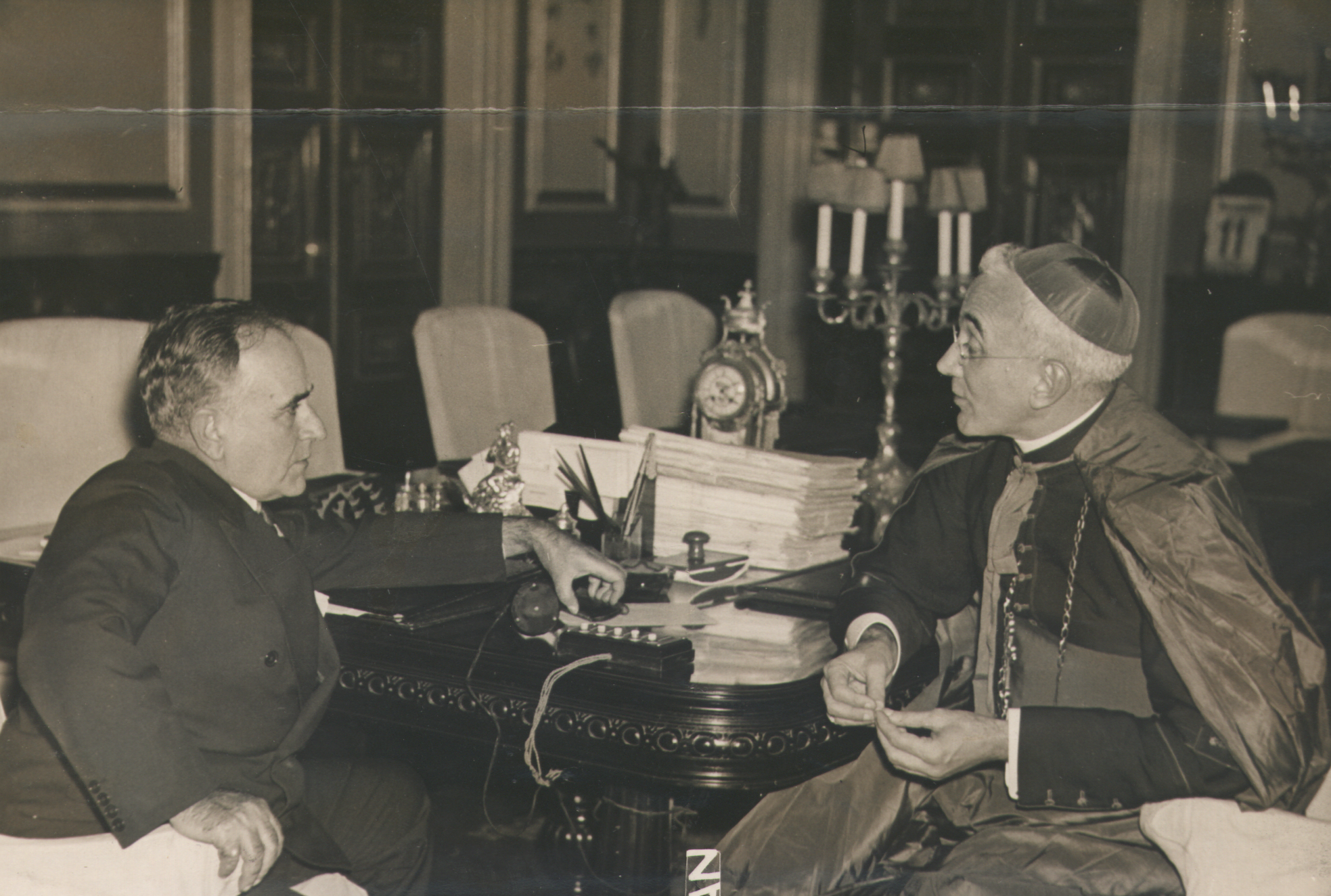
Vargas with future Pope Pius XII, center first row, 22 October 1934 (left). Vargas and cardinal Dom Augusto da Silva, date unknown (center). Vargas and archbishop Dom Aquino Correia, 1938 (right).

=== Resistance ===
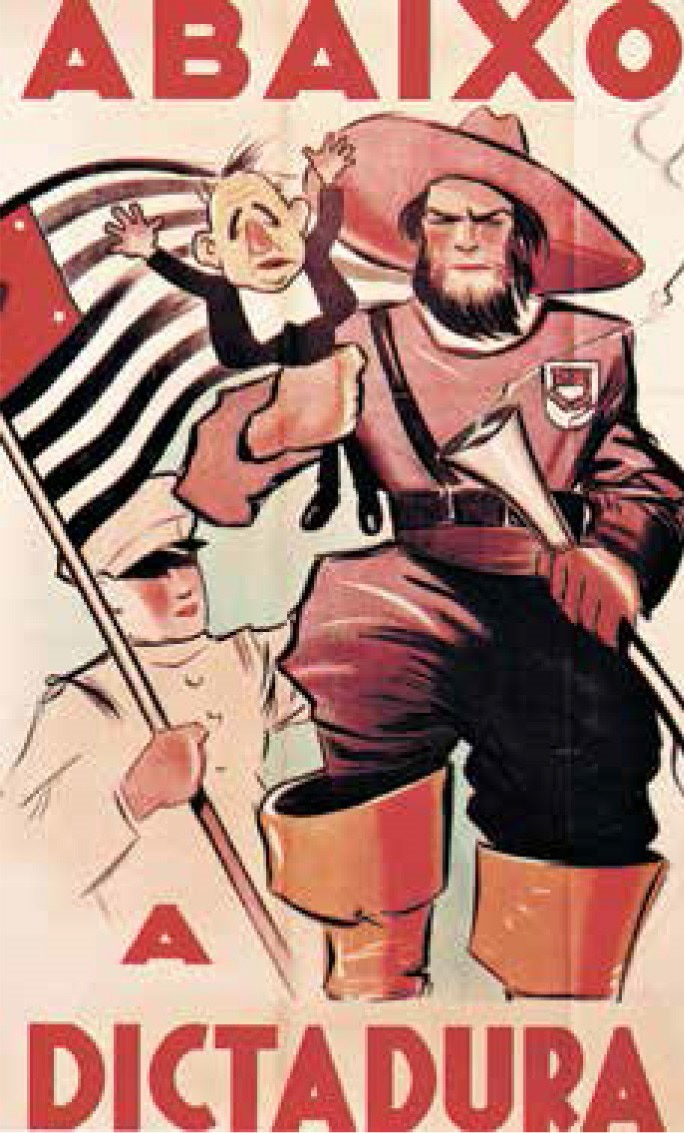
A recruiting poster for the 1932 Constitutionalist Revolution portraying Vargas in the hands of a Bandeirante. The poster is calling to "take down the dictatorship"

The adjustment from the Old Republic to a new regime was painful despite Vargas's reforms. After a rebellion broke out in Recife in May 1931, Aranha and General Leite de Castro presented Vargas with a decree which would declare martial law for mutinies. Vargas told them to redraft it, and Aranha told Vargas's secretary, "This Getúlio has a passive resistance that is enervating." While Vargas increased his support with senior army officers, bloody riots broke out in Recife in October 1931. In February 1932, the Democratic Party of São Paulo joined forces with Republicans in a united front against Vargas. There was even a front in Vargas's home state of Rio Grande do Sul, pushing for a seven-point program, the instant restoration of individuals' rights, the guarantee of freedom of the press, and the election of a constituent assembly. At this point, some foreign diplomats had much doubt Vargas had any control of events, observing the division between revolutionary leaders and unrest in the country.

The painful transition between regimes was most evident in the 1932 Constitutionalist Revolution, a three-month long civil war in Brazil (9 July–2 October 1932) which pitted São Paulo, now suffering as their interests and pride were lost, against the federal government in the name of a free constitution. Furthermore, the state of São Paulo was distressed with Vargas's implementation of interventors to replace state presidents. São Paulo's interventor, João Alberto Lins de Barros, was extremely unpopular in the state, becoming the subject of hostility by politicians and the press despite his best efforts to appease them. He was forced to resign in July 1931 after a minor rebellion in April of that year, and three separate interventors succeeded him until mid-1932, including a civilian interventor Vargas appointed in March.

The state believed Minas Gerais and Rio Grande do Sul would join them and a potential coup would transpire, which was not the case. However, Vargas felt depressed during the crisis, with both Alzira and Monteiro noting he was passing through an abrupt mental stage at the beginning of the revolt. Although federal forces defeated the revolutionaries, a new constitution would be enacted two years later in the aftermath. Vargas, meanwhile, enforced soft peace terms, ordered the federal government to pay half of the rebels' debt, and refused to bomb or invade the city of São Paulo during the conflict, rather limiting fighting to the outskirts of the city. Vargas, especially during his early years, was always in danger of being ousted by one or more of the groups in his coalition, including the anti-São Paulo planters, the bourgeoisie, and the military. Rumors circulated in his provisional presidency about coups both left- and right-wing, though they had no basis.

=== Electoral reform and the 1934 Constitution ===
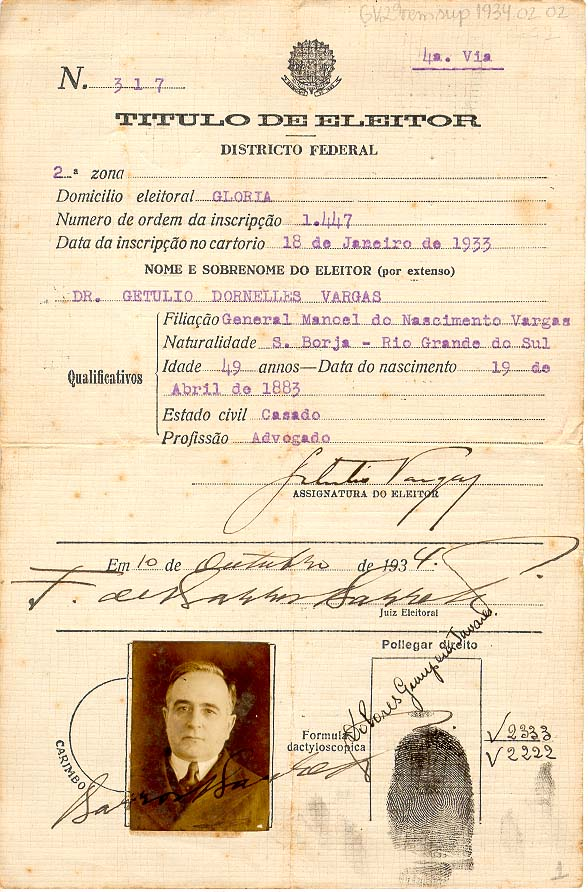
Vargas's voter registration, October 1934. His date of birth had already been changed to 1883.

Under Vargas's regime, the federal government maintained a responsibility for protecting the secret vote in elections, and many voting reforms were introduced, including the establishment of the Electoral Justice, women's suffrage, and a lowering of the voting age from twenty-one to eighteen. Fraud was reduced, and the Electoral Justice was tasked with the organization and oversight of elections and the judgement of appeals.

Prior to the São Paulo revolt, Vargas made a promise to hold elections in a speech in May 1932. The same speech highlighted the achievements produced by the provisional government, including education reform and a balanced budget. He contrasted the contemporary history of England and France to Brazil's situation, justifying the need for emergency powers during an economic crisis. Vargas fulfilled his promise when, in May 1933, elections for a National Constituent Assembly were held. There was an increase in popular participation as well as party organization. The Communist Party was banned, however, and the many parties that appeared were in states. There were no national parties with the exception of the right-wing Brazilian Integralist Action.

The Constituent Assembly, elected under Vargas's provisional presidency, convened from 1933 until 1934. After months of debate, they initiated a new Constitution of Brazil, the third one in its history, which guaranteed an impartial judiciary, government responsibility for the economy, and general welfare. Similar to the Constitution of 1891, it established a federal republic in Brazil, and it was modeled after Germany's Weimar Constitution. The new constitution reflected Vargas's earlier reforms: it dealt with minimum wage, labor rights, compulsory attendance and free primary schools, classes in religion (although it was open to all religions and elective in public schools), and national security. The constitution went into force on 14 July 1934, and the Constituent Assembly (which would be succeeded by the Chamber of Deputies) elected Vargas on 15 July to a four-year term to continue his presidency, now constitutionally. Vargas's constitutional presidency was set to expire on 3 May 1938. Historian Thomas Skidmore reflected on Vargas's transition to a new regime; "It looked as if Brazil was finally going to be allowed an experiment in modern democracy."

=== Authoritarian direction ===
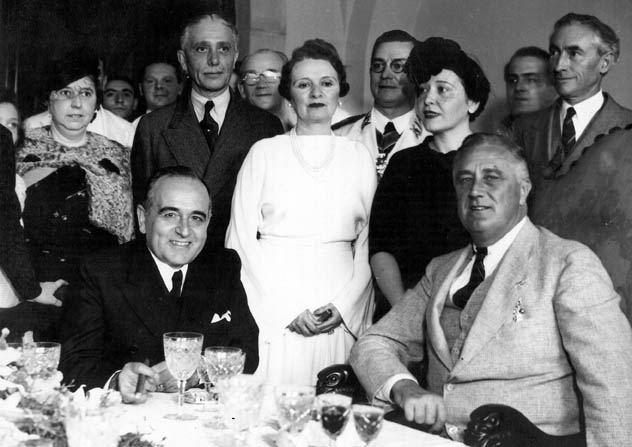
Vargas with U.S. President Franklin D. Roosevelt in 1936

Vargas had originally offered Luís Carlos Prestes the position as head of the military in 1930, but Prestes refused, opting instead to lead the Brazilian Communist Party. The Communist Party faced a problem, however. Their doctrine revolved around urban workers, whereas Brazil was still an agricultural society. Urban workers were mostly from rural backgrounds and did not want to participate, and workers who did were difficult to organize. Still, fear circulated amongst politicians and generals, and repressive measures were taken against communists. On 19 January 1931, Vargas ordered any communists be arrested and their property seized.

Communists staged marches, counter-marches, and street fights comparative to the climate in central Europe. The Communist Party and the Communist International hoped a military coup would overthrow the Brazilian government, weaken the United States and United Kingdom, and strengthen the Soviet Union. In November 1935, a series of uprisings at military bases in Natal, Recife, and Rio de Janeiro culminated in the communist uprising of 1935. The Comintern believed they had sufficientally infiltrated the army to allow Prestes to carry out the coup, but Vargas's forces "crushed" all revolts. In reality, the uprising played into Vargas's hands. The Comintern and the Communist Party were unaware they were under surveillance by Brazilian police, and their attack gave evidence for a "Bolshevik threat".

Skidmore said that Vargas's government "had a propaganda field day after it crushed the revolt, circulating wildly exaggerated stories (later discredited by military records) about loyalist officers shot unarmed in their beds." Immediately after the revolt, Vargas convinced the National Congress to declare a state of emergency, during which he suspended civil rights, jailed trade unionists and his opposition, increased presidential powers, and bolstered police powers. For the next two years after the 1935 revolt, Vargas would keep persuading the Congress to renew the ninety-day state of siege, a period where the government held extraordinary police powers and there were growing concerns Vargas was preparing a self-coup. Prestes was also jailed in 1936 and sentenced to over sixteen years in prison. He would later be released in 1945 and campaigned for Vargas's policy the same year.

== Estado Novo (1937–1945) ==
=== Coup of 1937 ===
Radio address of the formation of the Estado Nôvo by President Vargas, 10 November 1937
On 10 November 1937, Vargas addressed the Brazilian people on the creation of his dictatorship, the Estado Nôvo. In Portuguese.

The fears of Vargas carrying out a self-coup were amplified by the authoritarian and pro-German military perceptions of his two top generals, Pedro Aurélio de Góis Monteiro and Minister of War Eurico Gaspar Dutra. He was becoming increasingly dependent on the military for support, and political attention now turned to the 1938 presidential elections. Now, Vargas's opposition turned to supporting Armando Salles de Oliveira, a member of the paulista elite who, Skidmore says, "were now trying to gain through the vote what they had failed to gain by arms in 1932." While Vargas government supported writer and minor politician from the Northeast Jose Americo de Almeida, the paulistas were now confident as they sought and received support from those against Vargas.

All the while, Vargas's power was loosening. Political debates allowed for repressive measures to be unfastened; 300 people were let out of prison by order of the Minister of Justice. Vargas and his government did not trust any of the three candidates, and one government observer even believed Brazil was at risk of becoming another Spain, that is, torn apart by civil war. Leading up to the coup which would place Vargas as dictator, he was a somewhat depressed man, and he never seemed to admit to himself he enjoyed his power. However, after a meeting with Monteiro and J. S. Maciel Filho, the president became reenergized, as evident by his following journal entries, though he was still saddened by the upcoming elections. One week before the coup, Vargas celebrated the seventh anniversary of his rise to power, devoting the evening to a "long" conversation with Monteiro.

The pretext for the coup was enunciated in the form of the Cohen Plan, a document discovered in September 1937 at the Ministry of War detailing plans for a violent communist uprising. In actuality, the document was a blatant falsification. After the Cohen Plan's revelation, on 10 November 1937, the coup was executed. All but one cabinet member signed the constitution per Vargas's request; military troops surrounded the National Congress and refused entry to congressmen; and the 1937 Constitution, corporatist and totalitarian, was now in force. The 1938 presidential elections were canceled, and Brazil became a dictatorship called the Estado Novo, or New State, led by Vargas. The National Congress acquiesced after some congressmen were imprisoned, and eighty legislators went to see Vargas in a show of support on 13 November. Meanwhile, life went on as usual in Brazil as the population took the transition calmly.

=== Establishment of the dictatorship ===
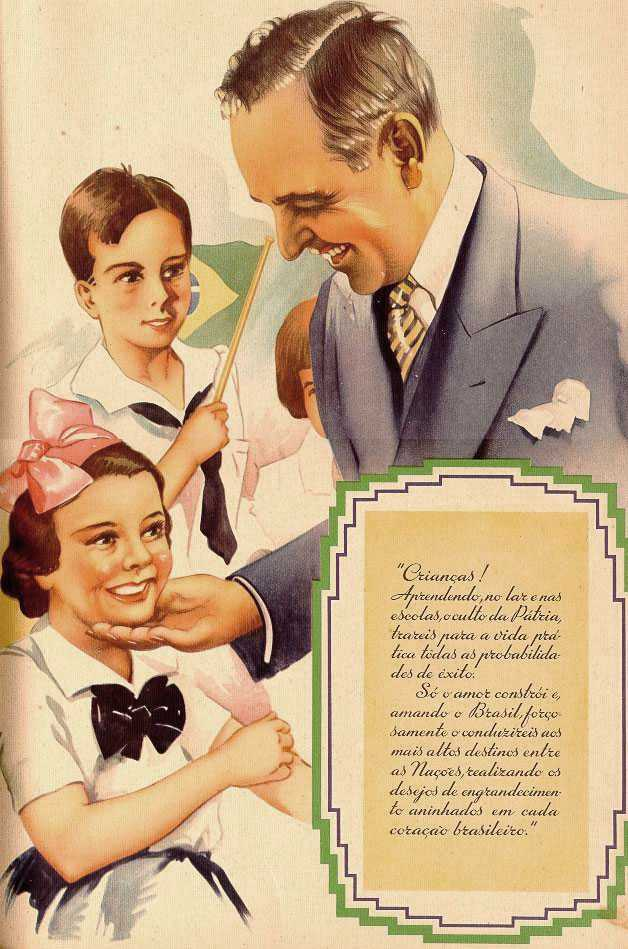
Vargas in propaganda of the Estado Novo promoting patriotic education to children, c. 1938

Vargas's most prominent opponents were either arrested or exiled. As censorship concealed the media and the police were given increased powers, the public fell silent. Like when he took office, Vargas effectively ruled by decree. The Integralists were initially supportive of the coup and the transition toward right-wing politics, anticipating their fellow Integralista Plínio Salgado to be offered a cabinet position, specifically the Minister of Education. The opposite ensued; Vargas's government enforced new restrictions on the movement's activities. In retaliation, a band of Integralists tried to overthrow the federal government themselves. From 10 through 11 May 1938, armed Integralists and disloyal palace guards attacked the presidential palace in an effort to depose him. They began firing at the building, where Vargas was sleeping, entering into a multihour-long siege with Vargas and Alzira. Federal reinforcements arrived at Vargas's aid; four attackers were killed with the rest being imprisoned. Salgado sought exile in Portugal, meanwhile. The result of the incident was a temporary chill on German-Brazilian relations.

Most of the constitution was produced by a single man, anti-liberal and anti-communist Francisco Campos, future Minister of Justice for Vargas. The new constitution was highly detailed and comprehensive, even more so since Campos was working in a rush. Article II stated that there shall be only one flag, hymn, and motto throughout the country, for instance. Campos would later hold a press conference and publicize the establishment of the National Press Council, created for the intention of "perfect coordination with the government in the control of the news and of political and doctrinal material." In general, the new era incorporated components from European fascism, though the president relied on the army for support rather than political parties. Antiliberalism was also very apparent.

Vargas outlawed all political parties on 2 December 1937. A plebiscite to approve the new regime was abandoned, the proposed congress never convened, and Vargas's term of office was prolonged by six years. Personally, Vargas told foreign reporters the Estado Novo was democratic at heart but promoted authoritarianism at home. When Alzira asked him about the plebiscite, Vargas replied, "The whole purpose of the coup of November 10 was to avoid any electoral action which could prejudice us at this time; and yet you ask me questions about the plebiscite?" Industrial expansion was performed and support for coffee was diminished. Campos had suggested a totalitarian party and the Minister of Education requested a fascist youth program, both of which Vargas demonstrated little enthusiasm for and buried. "Brasilidade" led to a reform of Portuguese spelling and the closure of foreign language schools and newspapers with the main targets being German and Italian communities. In regard to fundamental issues, Vargas's personal power was the deciding factor; trust between the president and his ministers increased, and between March 1938 and June 1941 there was not a change in ministers.

=== Nationalism and domestic policy as dictator ===
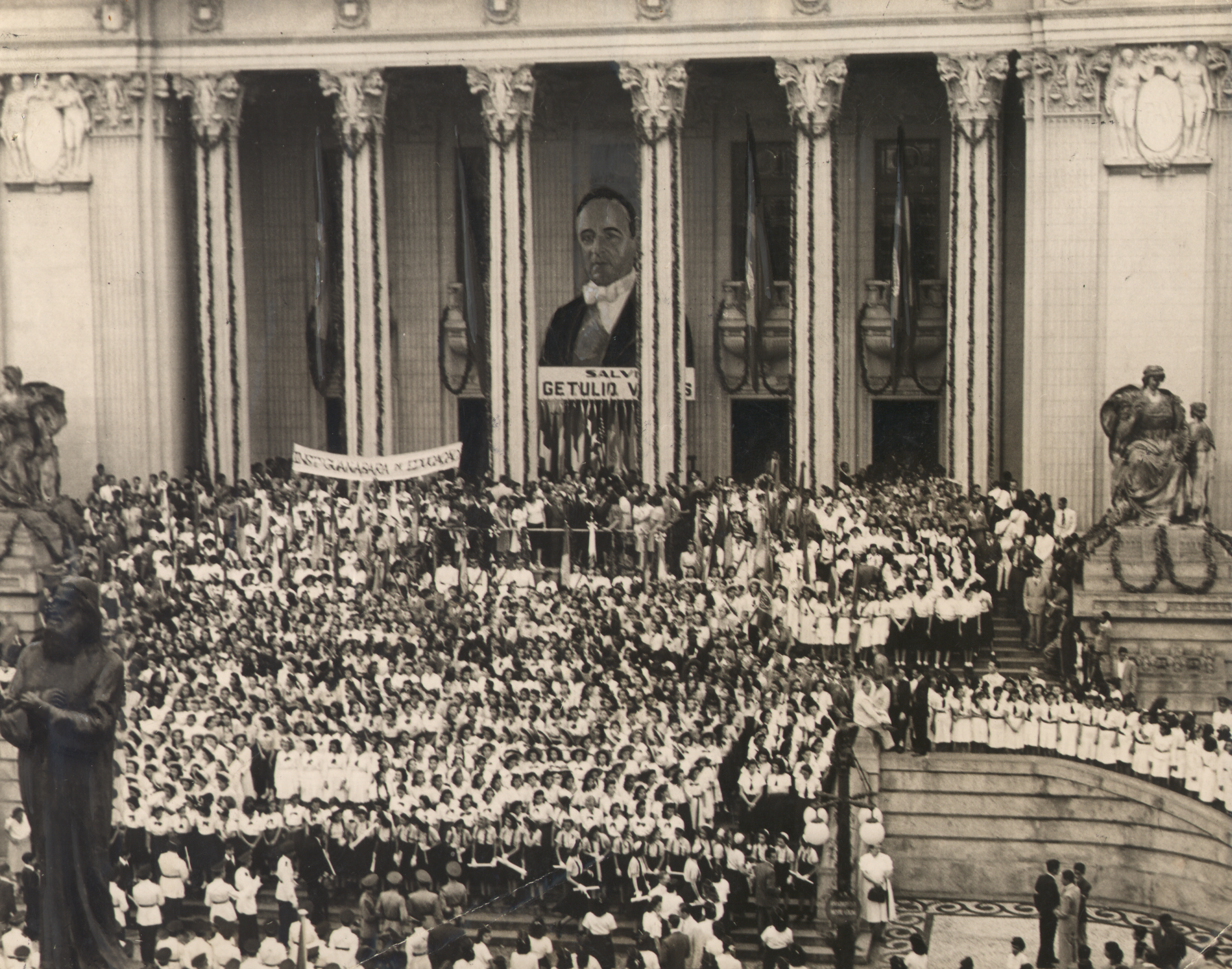
Celebrations for Vargas on his 60th birthday, 19 April 1942

According to historian Teresa Meade, "Because the major social reforms of the Estado Novo were enactment of a minimum-wage law and the codification of all labor reforms since 1930 into a single labor act, Vargas was able to win to his party the devotion of the urban workers." Such labor laws were also centered around corporatism. Vargas's image as the "workers' guardian" took hold in ceremonies, such as the May Day celebration, where masses would gather. He used the radio to communicate and bring workers and the government together, and the labor minister gave weekly radio speeches.

From 1930 until 1938, the wage index rose from 230 to 315 points; this contrasted with the cost of living, however, from 290 to 490 points, with the cost of living doubling in Rio de Janeiro and nearly tripling in São Paulo. However, in respect to the Great Depression, Brazil reemerged from the economic crisis sooner than the United Kingdom or the United States, a comeback sustained by World War II production, American technology, and Brazilians turning to Brazilian producers when shipping was interrupted. Beginning in 1935, industrialists became interested in establishing oil refineries in the country, such as Standard Oil (1936) and Texaco (1938) amongst others who established "huge" refineries in Brazil, though they would be nationalized in Brazilian hands in April 1938 via decree-law. The president also decided to stop paying the national debt right after the coup, too, proclaiming that Brazil could either modernize its armed forces and transportation or pay the debt.

Vargas at the inauguration of the Imperial Museum of Brazil, 16 March 1943

Popular culture was also an important aspect of Vargas's dictatorship. In 1941, his government created the National Sport Council, and, as Skidmore concludes, "Vargas was one of the first politicians to appreciate the political payoff from supporting it." Another example was the Rio Carnival: Vargas's government was the first (on the federal level) to support samba schools and Rio parades, both of which had become a universal symbol of Brazilian culture. Two achievements resulted: an economic benefit (tourism) and a greater national identity. Moreover, Vargas's government launched an elaborate campaign of restoring historic and religious architecture, sculpture, and painting. In Petrópolis, the Imperial Museum of Brazil was restored, and the Ministry of Education and Culture building in Rio de Janeiro which was designed by Brazilian architect Oscar Niemeyer (construction began in 1936 and finished in 1943). A darker side to the Vargas-sponsored work with a national identity was to protect the country from those who were deemed "un-Brazilian", such as Japanese Brazilians or Jewish Brazilians. Official and unofficial discrimination was performed, limited mainly to closing "foreign" newspapers, schools, and organizations, but it never reached the magnitude of Nazi Germany.

=== Pre-war foreign policy ===
Between the Axis and the Allies

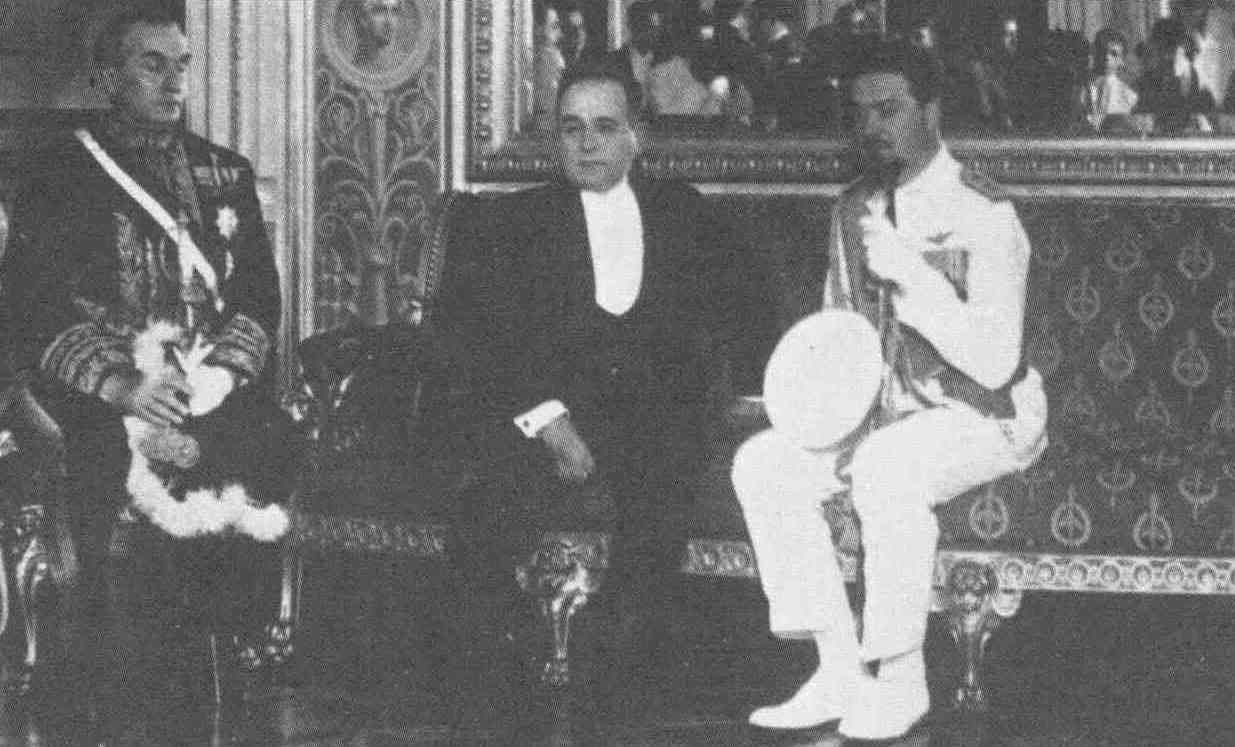
Vargas (center) with Italo Balbo of Fascist Italy, 15 January 1931

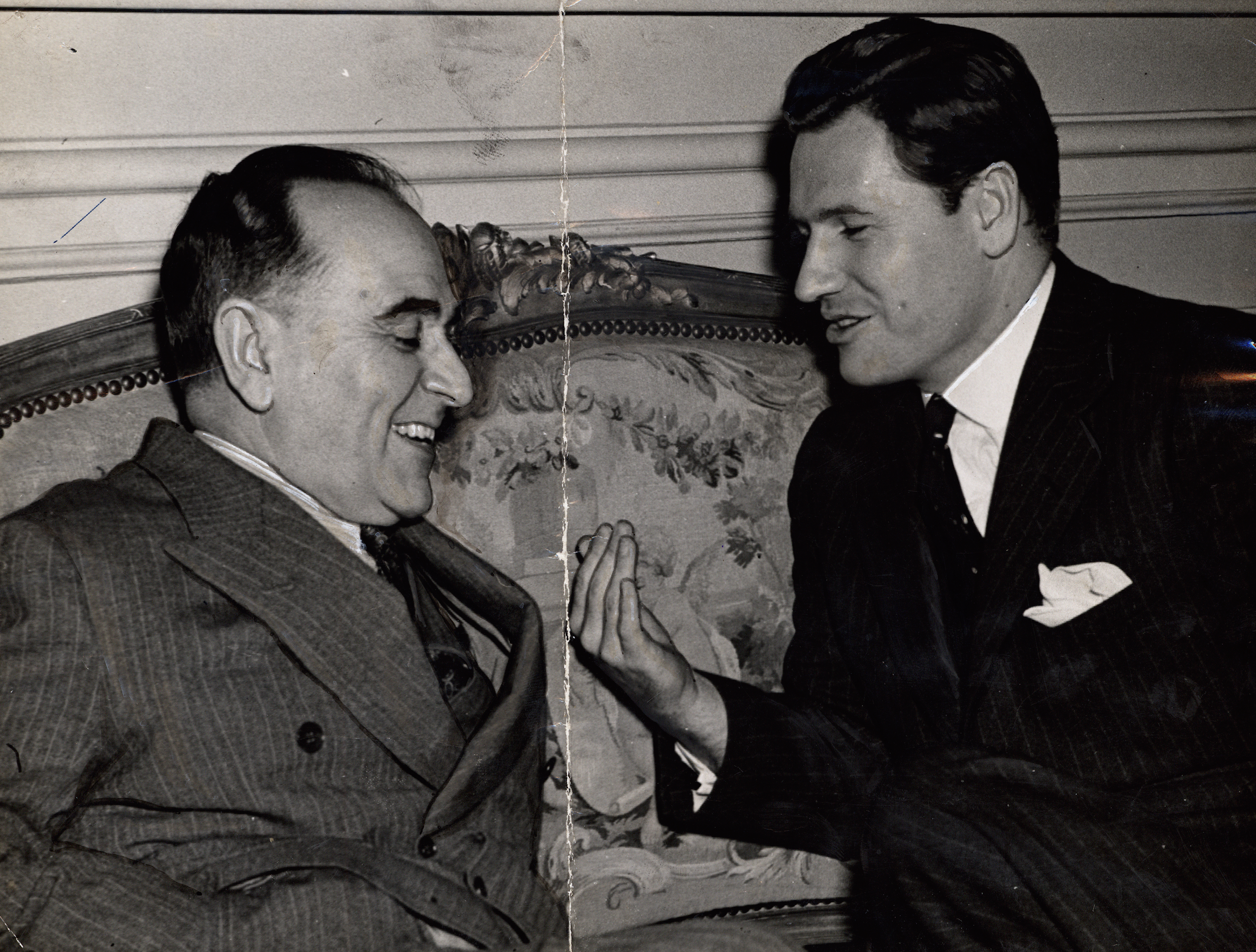
With Nelson Rockefeller, Coordinator of Inter-American Affairs, of the United States, 1942

In Europe, Nazi Germany viewed Brazil as a key trading partner. From 1933 to 1938 (a time period encompassing parts of all three periods of Vargas's first presidency), German-Brazilian trade magnified. Principally, Germany bought Brazilian cotton in return for German industrial goods, all the while the United Kingdom being the main loser. Germany hoped to lure Brazil into the German politico-military sphere. They sold weapons to Brazil and offered technical training, and the 1937 coup was praised in Germany and Italy. The U.K. did have a major role in aiding Vargas's police and intelligence forces, though. British agents provided information on foreign threats and assisted the country during the 1935 communist uprising.

Meanwhile, in the aftermath of the 1937 coup, the United States immediately asked for an explanation from Brazil's ambassador Aranha. The U.S. recognized Brazil's strategic position on the Atlantic coast and the potential of it playing a vital role in dominating air and sea traffic. The American military worried the coup would bring Brazil closer to Nazi Germany, aware of Vargas' advisers', specifically Dutra's and Monteiro's, beliefs. They had been struggling to influence Brazil, and the existence of a large German-speaking population in Brazil's South strengthened American fears of the Vargas dictatorship. Under U.S. President Franklin D. Roosevelt, the United States began the Good Neighbor policy toward Latin America in what Bourne describes as a modern Monroe Doctrine. Similar to pre-World War I, the U.S. State Department also denounced the German trade policy. The military tried to counter German offers of arms and training, but they failed. Vargas had, in fact, tried to negotiate to obtain U.S. military equipment first, but the isolationist United States Congress refused, even outlawed, foreign arms sales.

In 1937, Vargas offered U.S. president Franklin D. Roosevelt the use of Brazilian coastal bases, but the offer was refused. This was most likely because Roosevelt was either to follow the U.S. Congress or abandon them, for if he did accept the offer it would have looked like he was preparing for war. In 1939, at the beginning of the Second World War, Vargas and Roosevelt both remained neutral, though Vargas continued to foster relations with the Axis powers. By 1941, however, Vargas still left his options open, approving a plan to modernize North and Northeast airports by Pan American Airways under a contract by the U.S. army.

=== World War II ===
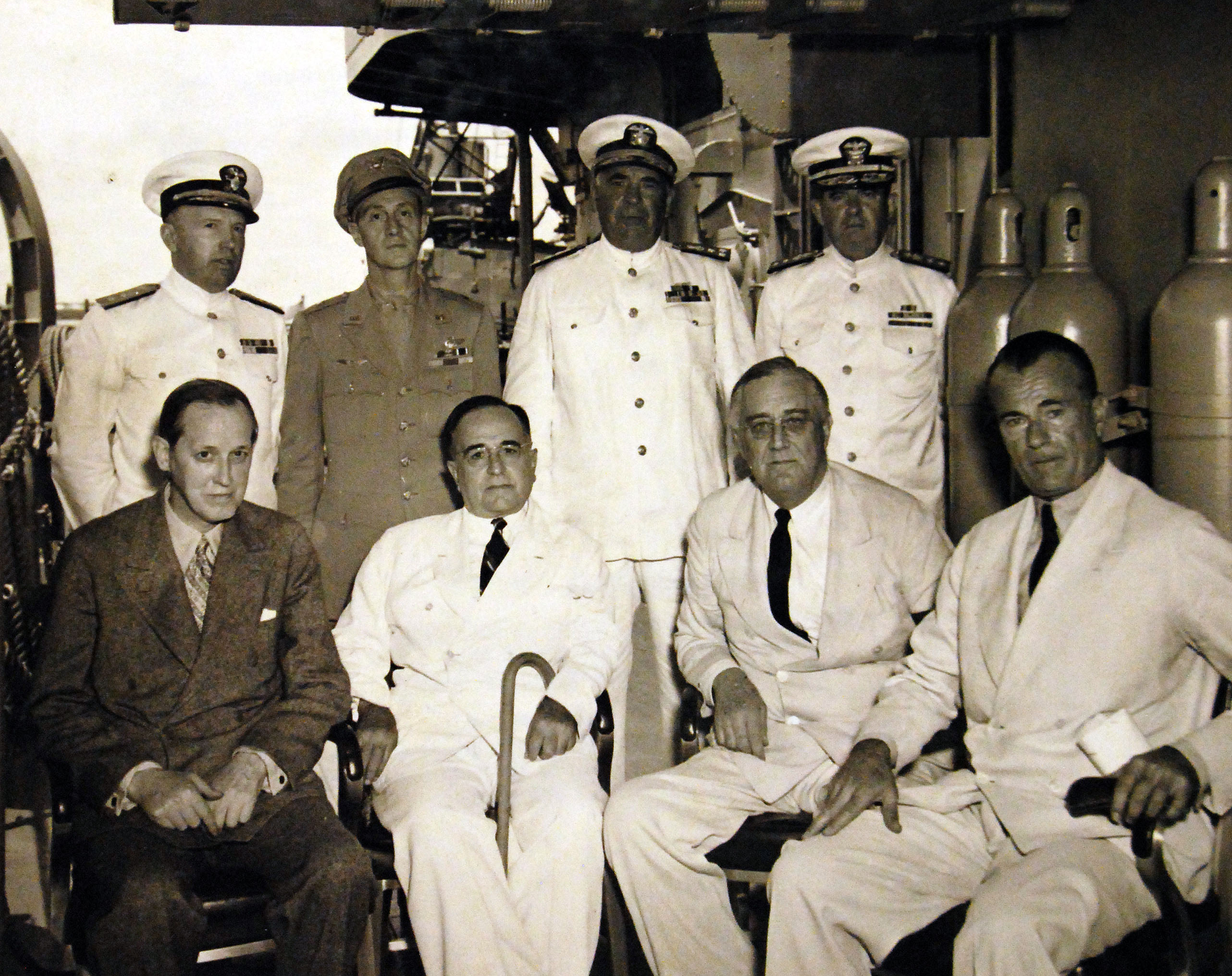
President Vargas and President Roosevelt on the USS Humboldt following a conference, 28 January 1943. Among them are Jefferson Caffery, U.S. ambassador to Brazil. Seated on the left is Harry Hopkins.

When Japan attacked Pearl Harbor on 7 December 1941 and the leader of Germany, Adolf Hitler, declared war on the United States on 11 December, it became apparent that Brazil's military odds were in favor of the Allies of World War II. This was reinforced with the disastrous invasion of the Soviet Union by Germany and their losses in the Atlantic. In addition, the U.S. was already forging alliances with Brazil; an important commercial deal in 1939 and the sale of ninety six-inch (152 mm) surplus guns to Brazil in March 1940, followed by a visit from Monteiro to the United States in October, centered foreign policy with the U.S. With this, Brazil declared war on Italy and Germany, following torpedo attacks on Brazilian ships and the sinking of a Brazilian submarine that year, on 21 August 1942, providing the allies with raw materials and Brazil's strategic coastline. The siding with the Allies led to Monteiro and Dutra both turning in their resignations, which the president rejected. Moreover, Vargas struck an "attractive" deal; in exchange for raw materials, the U.S. military provided equipment, technical assistance, and financing for a Brazilian steel mill, at Volta Redonda, finalized in July 1940.

Vargas hoped to identify Brazil with the Allied cause. He offered three Brazilian army divisions to fight the Germans in the Mediterranean with the purpose of dramatizing Brazil's role in the war and to uplift Brazilian pride at home. Additionally, a contingent of the army fought crucial battles in the Italian campaign in 1944 and further reinforced war pride and antifascism. Vargas insisted every state be represented, whatever the quality of local recruits. His government now held even more power as the need to ration essentials increased, and centralization persisted yet again in Brazil.

=== Fall from power ===
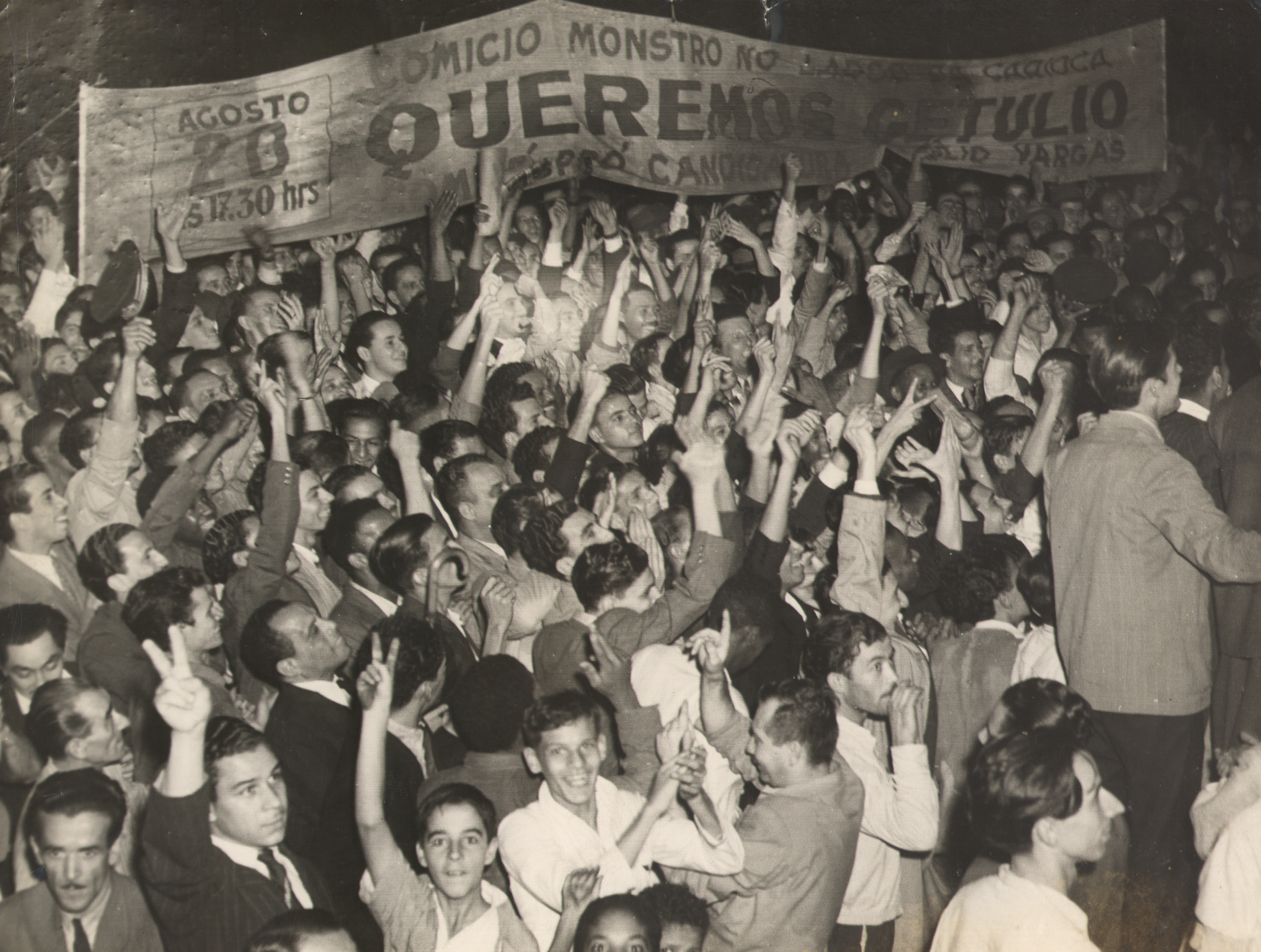
Pro-Vargas demonstrations on 21 August 1945.

Though abroad the government defended democracy, there was increasing discontent at home when World War II finished due to the authoritarian policies by Vargas and his government. Growing political movements and democratic demonstrations forced Vargas to abolish censorship in 1945, release numerous political prisoners, and allow for the reformation of political parties, including the Brazilian Communist Party, which supported Vargas after direction from Moscow. University students began to mobilize in 1943 against Vargas; strikes, which were banned, began to re-emerge thanks to war inflation, and even Aranha was in favor of a democratic shift. Vargas himself built support after establishing the Brazilian Labour Party (and his aforementioned support from urban workers) and also found help from the left when it applied. With that, Vargas added the Additional Act to the constitution, which, among other things, provided for a 90-day period during which a time and date for elections would be designated. Precisely ninety days afterward, the new electoral code was issued, established 2 December 1945 for the election of the president and a (new) constituent assembly, and state elections on 6 May 1946. Furthermore, Vargas promulgated his intention not to run for president. The military feared that Vargas was about to seize absolute power (after a detrimental move on 25 October 1945, removing João Alberto from chief of police of the Federal District and replacing him with Vargas's brother Benjamim), so they forced his resignation and deposed him on 29 October, ending his first presidency.

== Between presidencies (1945–1951) ==
In the 1945 elections, Vargas demonstrated his continued popular support by winning election as senator for São Paulo and Rio Grande do Sul, and member of the chamber of deputies from nine different states. He accepted the senate seat for Rio Grande, but effectively went into semiretirement. In 1950, he reemerged as a prominent political force when he ran for president as the candidate of the Brazilian Labor Party. He won the election and took office on 31 January 1951.

== Second presidency (1951–1954) ==
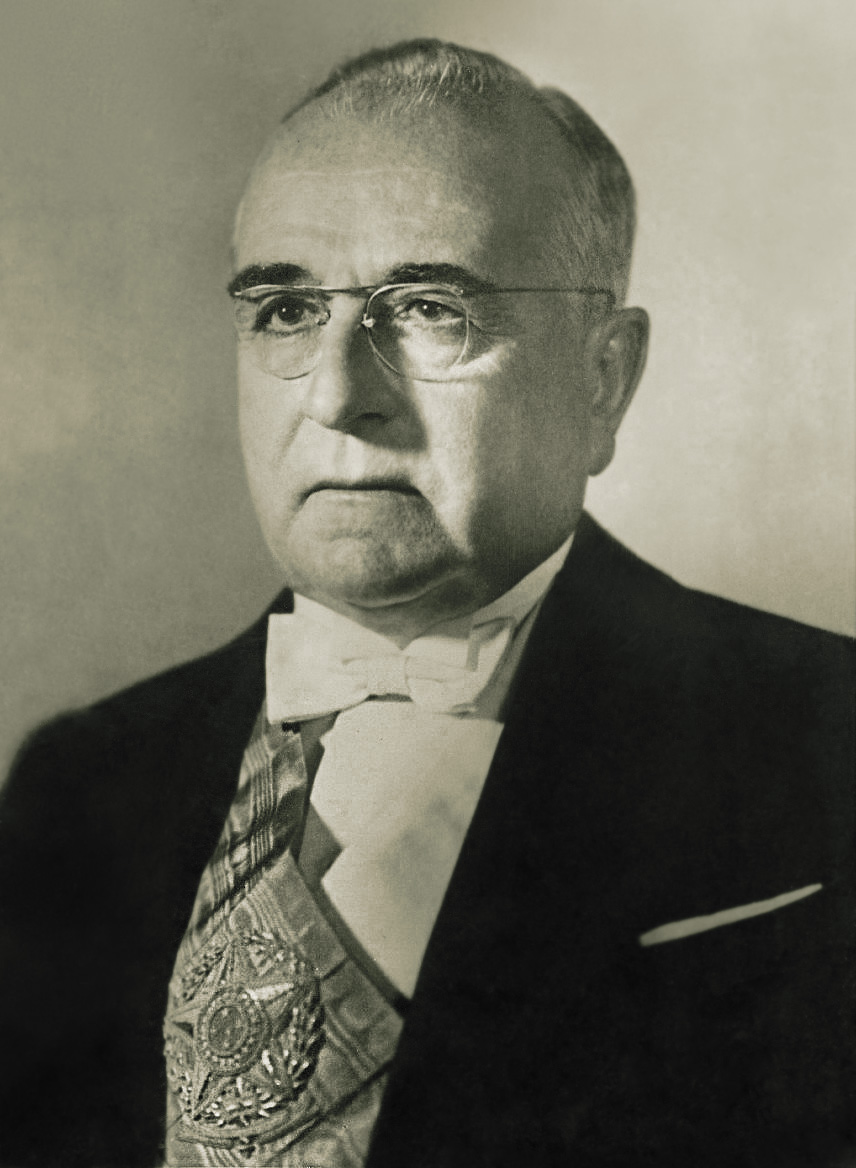
Vargas' second term official portrait, 1951

When he left the Estado Novo presidency, the economic surplus of Brazil was high and the industry was growing. After four years, however, pro-U.S. president Dutra wasted huge quantities of money protecting foreign investments, mostly North American, and distanced himself from the ideas of nationalism and the country's modernisation championed by Vargas. Vargas returned to politics in 1951, and, through a free and secret ballot, was re-elected president of the Republic. Hampered by the economic crisis largely engendered by Dutra's policies, Vargas pursued a nationalist policy, turning to the country's own natural resources and away from foreign dependency. As part of this policy, he founded Petrobras (Brazilian Petroleum), a multinational petroleum consortium, with the Government of Brazil as its majority stakeholder.

=== Death ===
Replica of the letter at Getúlio Vargas Square, in Nova Friburgo

Vargas' political adversaries initiated a crisis which culminated in the murder of an Air Force officer, Major Rubens Vaz, killed during an assassination attempt in the street outside 180 Rua Tonelero, the home of Vargas' main adversary, publishing executive and politician, Carlos Lacerda. Lieutenant Gregório Fortunato, chief of Vargas' personal guard, nicknamed "Black Angel", was implicated in the crime. This aroused anger in the military against Vargas, with generals demanding his resignation. In a last-ditch effort, Vargas called a special cabinet meeting on the evening of Tuesday, 24 August, but rumours spread that army officers were implacable.

Unable to manage the situation, Vargas shot himself in the chest with a revolver at 8:45 BRT on 24 August 1954, in his third-floor bedroom of his official residence of Catete Palace.

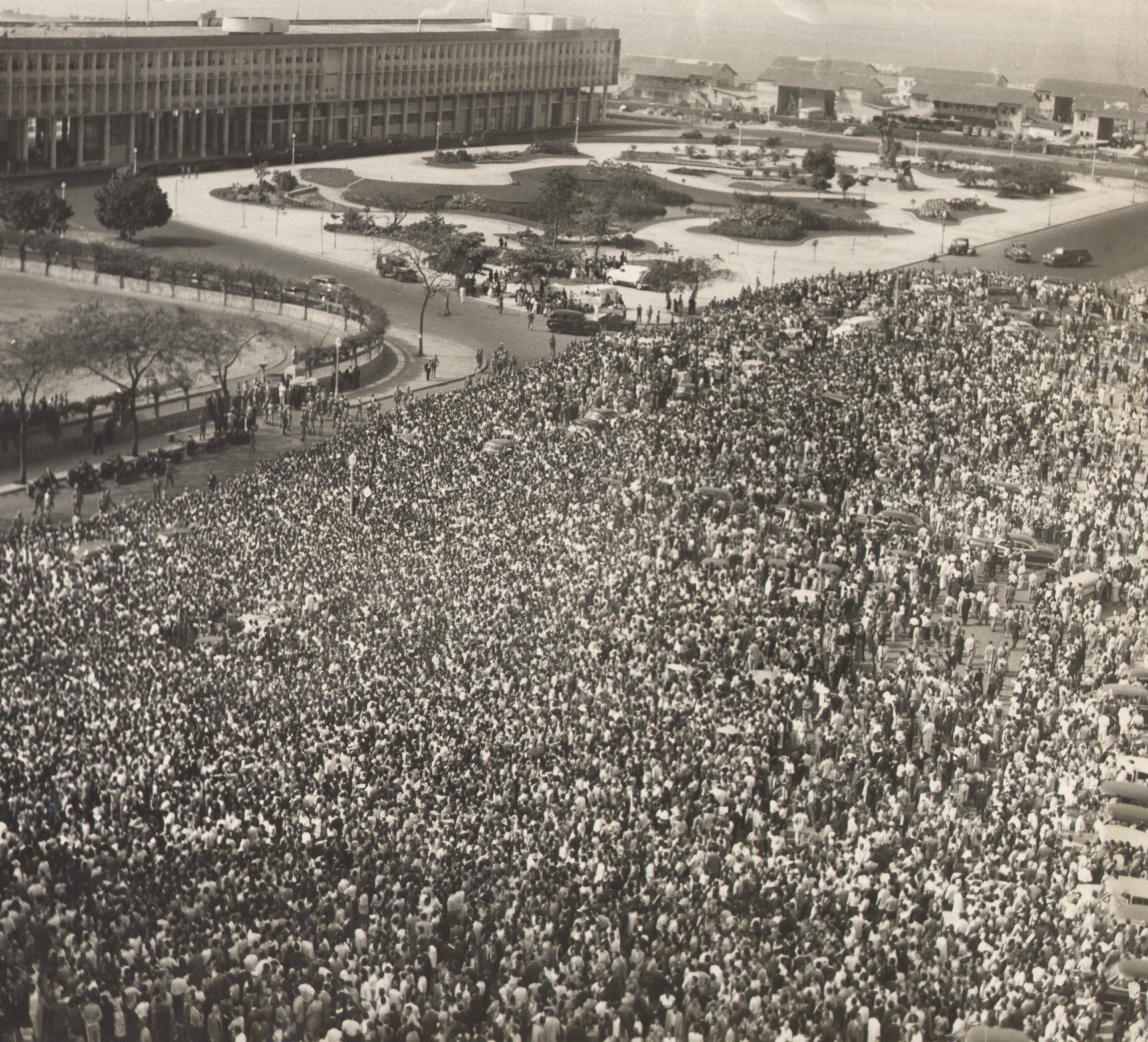
Crowds gather in front of Santos Dumont Airport during the transport of Vargas' body from Rio de Janeiro for burial in São Borja, 26 August 1954

His suicide note was found and read out on radio within two hours of his son discovering the body. The famous last lines read, "Serenely, I take my first step on the road to eternity. I leave life to enter History." Vargas' suicide has been interpreted in various ways. "His death by suicide simultaneously traded on the image of a valiant warrior selflessly fighting for the protection of national interests, alongside the image of a crafty and calculating statesman, whose political machinations reeked of demagoguery and self-interest." That same day, riots broke out in Rio de Janeiro and Porto Alegre.

The Vargas family refused a state funeral, but his successor, Café Filho, declared official days of mourning. Vargas' body was on public view in a glass-topped coffin, and the route of the funeral cortege from Catete Palace to the airport was lined with tens of thousands of Brazilians. Vargas’ burial and memorial service were held in his hometown of São Borja, Rio Grande do Sul.

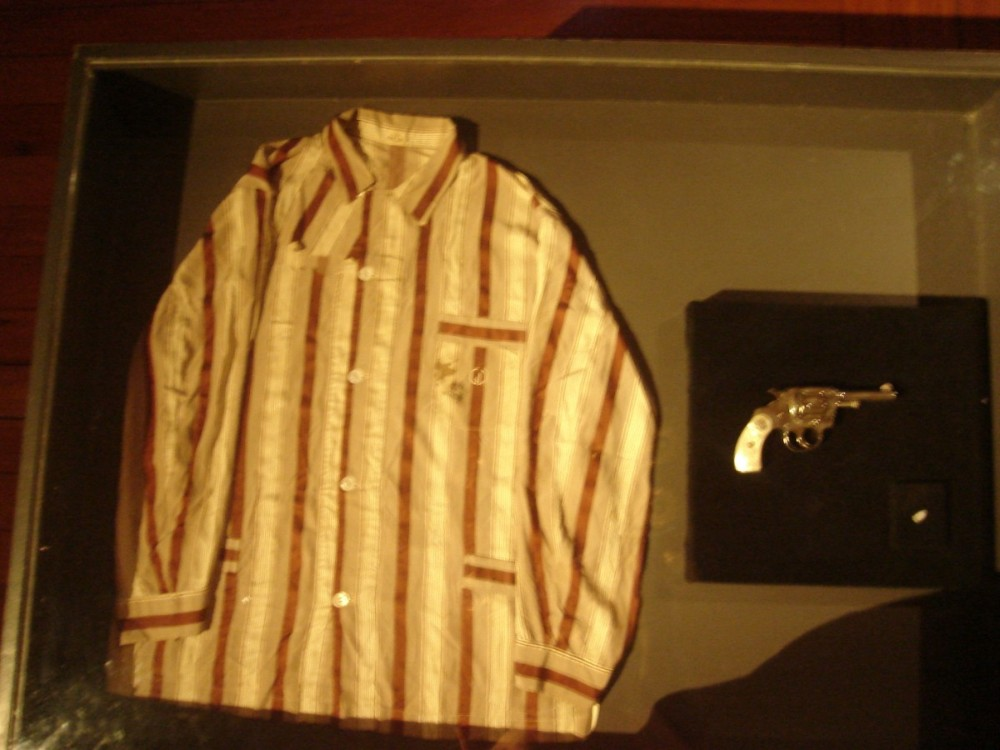
Display at the MHN of Vargas' pyjama shirt that he wore at the time of his suicide and the revolver he used

The Museu Histórico Nacional (MHN) was given the furnishings of the palace bedroom where Vargas committed suicide; a gallery recreates the scene and is a site of remembrance. On display under glass is his pyjama top, with the bullet hole in the lower part of the monogrammed breast pocket.

The popular outrage triggered by Vargas' suicide had supposedly been strong enough to thwart the ambitions of his enemies for several years, including those among rightists, anti-nationalists, pro-American elements and even the pro-Prestes Brazilian Communist Party.

== Legacy ==
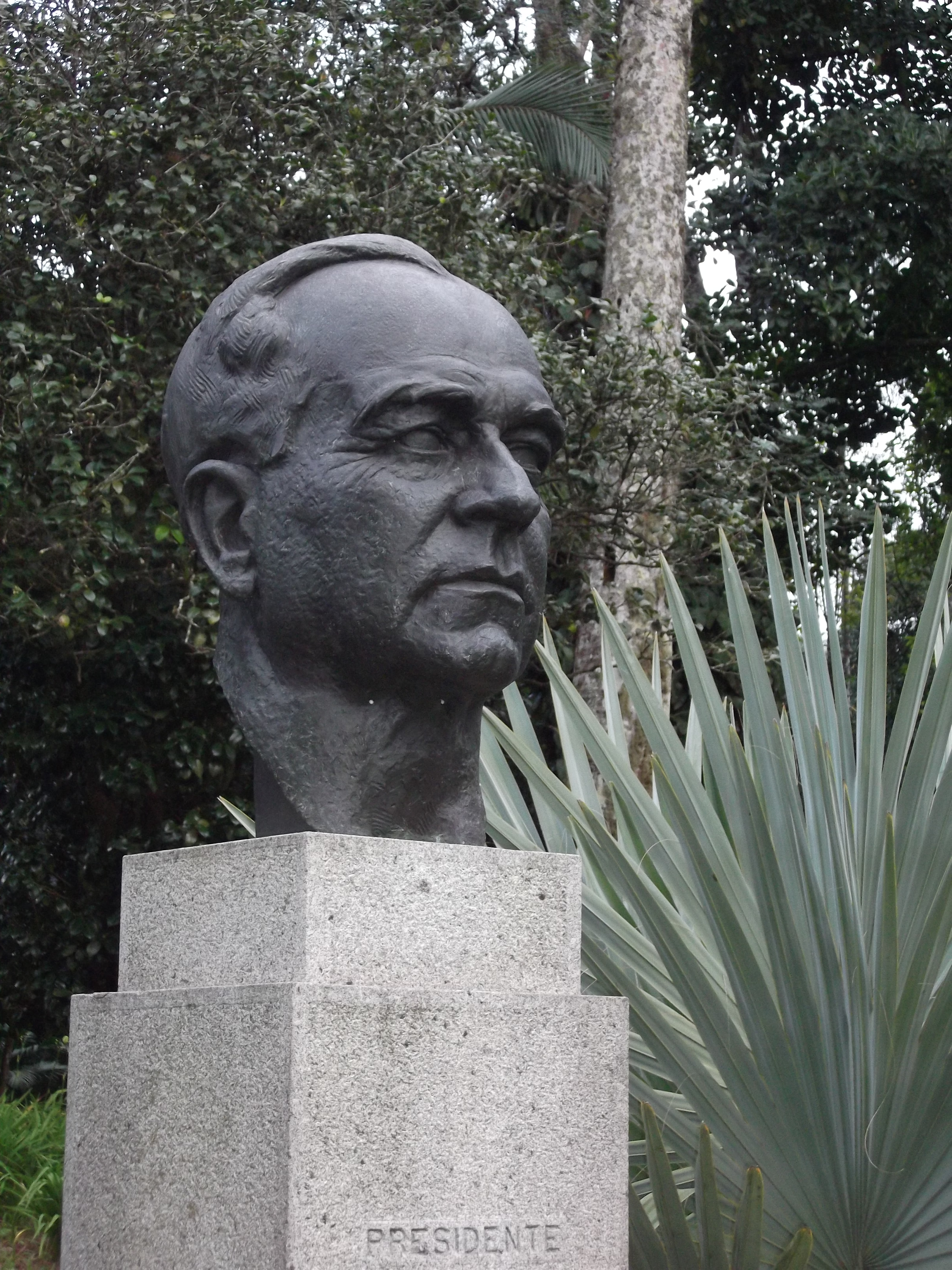
Bust at the Imperial Museum grounds in Petrópolis

Many historians have regarded Vargas as the most influential Brazilian politician of the 20th century, as well as the first to draw widespread support from the masses. Having fought against the influence of the elite, Vargas guided Brazil through the Great Depression, and he was nicknamed "the Father of the Poor" for his economic reform. One of Vargas' enduring political legacies is the campaign to nationalize Brazilian oil reserves. The Estado Novo's labor laws are often described through revisionist lenses, with President Lula recalling that he believed they were influenced by Italian Fascist Carta del Lavoro.

== See also ==
- History of Brazil (1930–1945)
- History of Brazil (1945–1964)
- Fundação Getulio Vargas
- Brazilian Integralism
- Tonelero Street
- Vargas Diamond

== Notes ==
Academic offices
Preceded by Alcântara Machado	3rd Academic of the 37th chair of the Brazilian Academy of Letters; 29 December 1943—24 August 1954	Succeeded by Assis Chateaubriand
Political offices
Preceded by Borges de Medeiros	President of Rio Grande do Sul; 1928–1930	Succeeded by Osvaldo Aranha
Preceded by Washington Luís	President of Brazil; 1930–1945	Succeeded by José Linhares
Preceded by Brazilian Military Junta of 1930	Head of State and Government of Brazil; 1930–1945	Succeeded by José Linhares
Preceded by Eurico Gaspar Dutra	President of Brazil; 1951–1954	Succeeded by Café Filho
