= Second presidency of Getúlio Vargas =

Brazilian presidential administration (1951–1954)

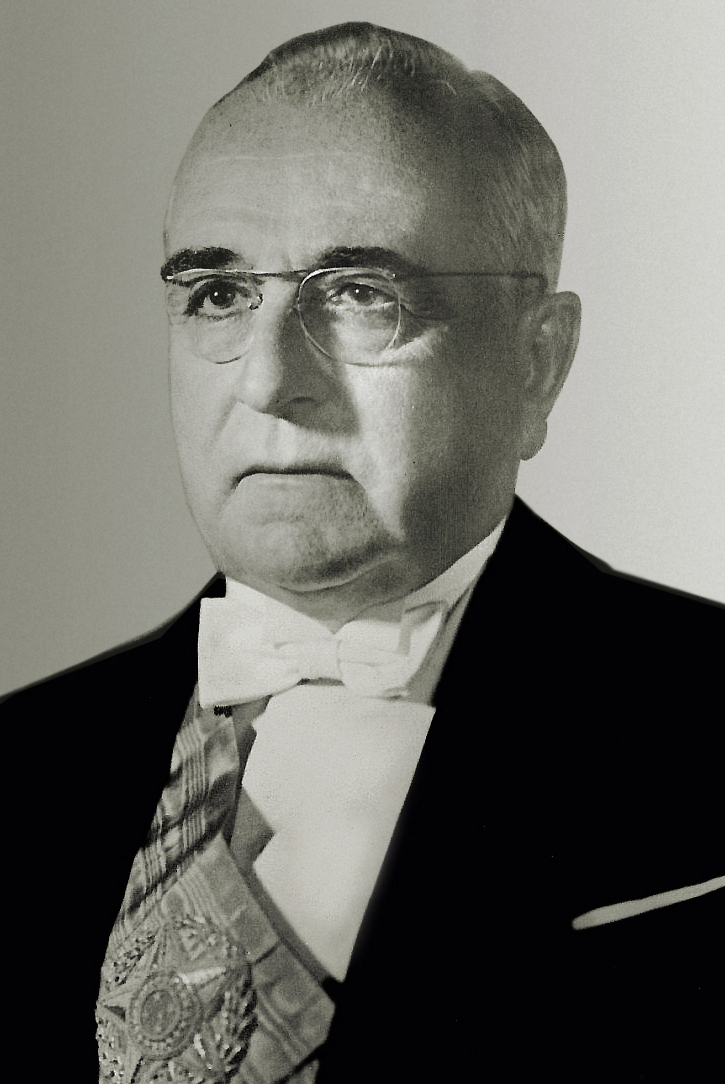
- Second presidency of Getúlio Vargas; 31 January 1951 – 24 August 1954
- President: Getúlio Vargas
- Party: PTB; PSP
- Election: 1950
- Seat: Catete Palace
- Standard of the President

The second presidency of Getúlio Vargas corresponds to the period of Brazilian political history that began on 31 January 1951, after he won the 1950 presidential election by direct vote with 3,849,040 against 2,342,384 for Eduardo Gomes, becoming the 17th President of Brazil; and ended on 24 August 1954, with his suicide and the vice-president, Café Filho, taking office.

Vargas' government was characterized by the creation of state companies such as Petrobras and the BNDES, but also by great instability, with staunch opposition from Carlos Lacerda and accusations of a coup and corruption. The culmination occurred with the Toneleiro Street shooting, a crime of which he was automatically considered a suspect by public opinion (he would later be cleared), resulting in his suicide 19 days later.

During his term, Brazil's GDP grew by an average of 6.2%, more than the 4.3% average growth of his first term.

== 1950 presidential election ==
In the 1950 election, Dutra supported PSD candidate Cristiano Machado and the UDN again launched the candidacy of Brigadier Eduardo Gomes. Getúlio Vargas was the nominee of the coalition between the Brazilian Labour Party (PTB) and the Social Progressive Party (PSP). To this day, Vargas was the first and only person to win a presidential election without winning in Minas Gerais.

In the election, Haroldo Lobo and Marino Pinto produced the jingle Retrato do velho in the rhythm of a marchinha, one of the most famous in Brazil.

== Presidency ==
Tancredo Neves, who was his Minister of Justice, said in the book Tancredo Fala de Getúlio that, in his second government, Getúlio "had the concern of freeing himself from the dictator", and that he told Tancredo: "I was a dictator because the contingencies of the country led me to dictatorship, but I want to be a constitutional president within the parameters set by the Constitution".

=== Ministry ===
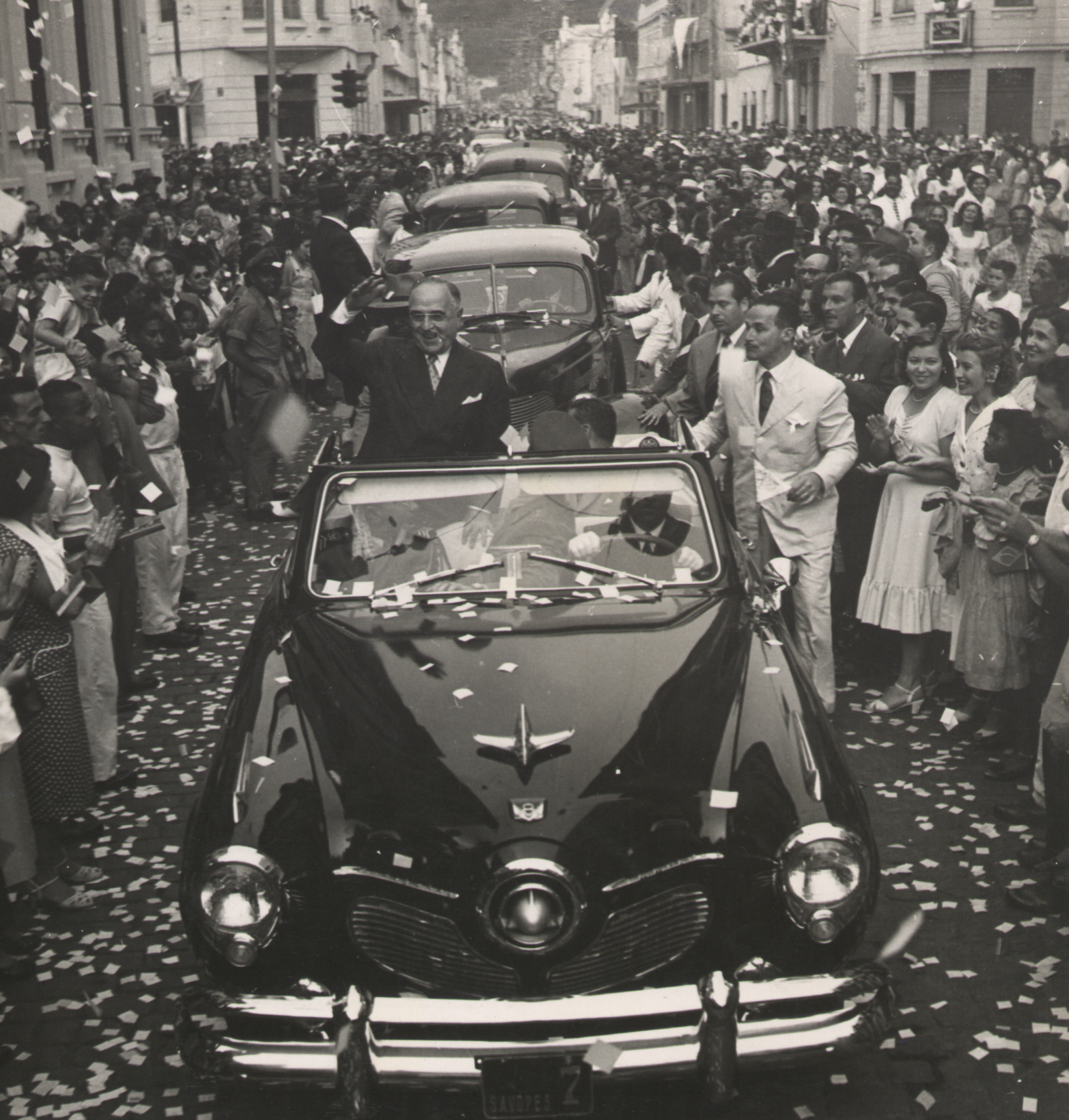
Getúlio parading in an open car through the streets of Vitória, Espírito Santo in 1951. Photograph kept by the National Archives

Getúlio brought former allies from the Revolution of 1930 to the ministry, with whom he reconciled: Pedro Aurélio de Góis Monteiro (Chief of the Armed Forces), Oswaldo Aranha (Treasury), João Neves da Fontoura and Vicente Rao (Foreign Affairs), as well as Juracy Magalhães as the first president of Petrobras and Batista Luzardo as ambassador to Argentina. Newton Estillac Leal, a former lieutenant in 1930, was Minister of War until 1953. Vargas also appointed José Américo, who was governor of Paraíba at the time, and who left his post as governor to become Minister of Roads and Public Works from June 1953.

Luís Vergara, Getúlio's private secretary from 1928 to 1945, in the book Eu fui secretário de Getúlio, says that Vargas referred to the group sworn in during 1951 as a "ministry of experience", which caused unease among the ministers. Vergara says that "knowing Getúlio's habit of only speaking the minimum and what was fair, his caution in not exceeding the limits of what was opportune and indispensable, the 'nap' revealed a weakening in the controls of self-surveillance and restraint of language", which Vergara attributes to the onset of aging and exhaustion with "fifteen uninterrupted years of government activity, multiplied worries, incessant work, political crises, personal accidents and family members".

Getúlio had a tumultuous government due to the administrative measures he took and the accusations of corruption. A controversial 100% readjustment of the minimum wage led to a public protest in February 1954, culminating in the resignation of Minister João Goulart.

=== Main Laws ===
- Law No. 1521, of 26 December 1951, referred to acts that are detrimental to free competition or aimed at forming cartels, oligopolies or monopolies and manipulating prices and market trends;
- Law No. 1.522, of 26 December 1951, authorized the federal government to intervene in the economic domain to ensure the free distribution of products necessary for the consumption of the people. It was replaced by Delegated Law No. 4 on 26 September 1962;
- Decree No. 30.363 of 3 3 January 1952, which provided for the return of foreign capital, limiting it to 8% of the total profits of international companies to the country of origin. It was repealed in 1991;
- Decree No. 31,546 of 6 October 1952, which regulated the work of underage apprentices and was in force until 2005;
- Law No. 1.802, of 5 January 1953, defined crimes against the State and Political and Social Order, and repealed the National Security Law of 1935. It remained in force until 1967, when it was replaced by another bill of the same name;
- Law No. 2,083, of 12 November 1953, on freedom of the press, which was in force until 1967;
- SUMOC Instruction No. 70 of 1953, which created multiple exchange rates and foreign exchange auctions;
- Law No. 2.252, of 1 July 1954, which dealt with the corruption of minors and was in force until 2009. It was repealed by Law No. 12.015.

=== Economy ===
The BNDES, created by the Federal Government in 1952, was initially as an autarchy under the name "BNDE"

Petrobras was created in 1953

On 20 June 1952, Law No. 1628 created the National Bank for Economic and Social Development, now the BNDES, as a state institution with administrative autonomy and its own legal personality.

In 1951, on his return from a trip to the Northeast to inspect the damage caused by the drought, Vargas was introduced to a list of reasons for creating a bank in the region by Horácio Láfer, the then Minister of Finance. On 19 July 1952, Law No. 1,649 created Banco do Nordeste, a development agency to promote the sustainable growth of the area by providing financial support to regional productive agents.

On 22 December 1952, Law No. 1779 created the Brazilian Coffee Institute (IBC), which was abolished in 1990. In 1953, there was a major national mobilization known as the "O petróleo é nosso" (English: "Oil is ours") campaign; later, on 3 October, Law No. 2,004 founded Petrobras and regulated the oil sector.

On 29 December 1953, Law No. 2,145 created the Carteira de Comércio Exterior do Banco do Brasil (CACEX), and on January 11, 1954, Law No. 2,168 created agrarian insurance, which is still in operation today.

In a Message to Congress in 1951, Getúlio said the number of migrants from the northeast of Brazil and the north of Minas Gerais to São Paulo doubled in 1951; in 1950 there were 100,123 migrants, and the following year, 208,515.

=== International relations ===
In March 1952, a military cooperation and aid agreement was signed between Brazil and the United States, which was in force from 1953 until 1977, when President Ernesto Geisel renounced it.

=== Corruption ===
There were a series of accusations of corruption against members of the government and people close to Getúlio, which led him to say that he was sitting in a "sea of mud". The most serious case, which turned a large part of public opinion against Getúlio, was the Parliamentary Inquiry Commission (CPI) into the newspaper Última Hora, owned by Samuel Wainer. He was accused by Carlos Lacerda and others of receiving money from the Banco do Brasil to support Getúlio. Última Hora was practically the only press organization to support the government.

=== Tonelero Street shooting ===
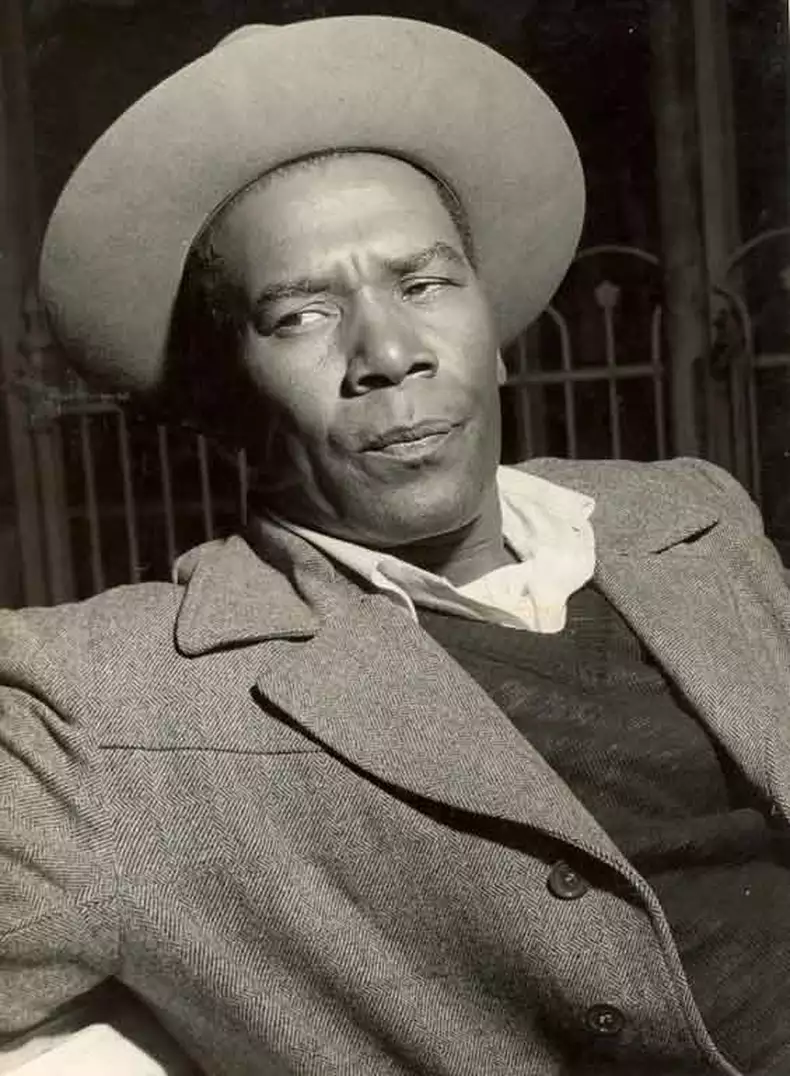
Gregório Fortunato, then head of Getúlio Vargas' guard and convicted mastermind of the crime

In the early hours of 5 August 1954, in the Copacabana neighborhood of Rio de Janeiro, a gun attack in front of the building where Carlos Lacerda lived killed Major Rubens Florentino Vaz of the Brazilian Air Force (FAB) and wounded Carlos, a journalist, future federal deputy and governor of Guanabara and a member of the UDN, who was strongly opposed to Getúlio. The attack was attributed to Alcino João do Nascimento and his assistant Climério Euribes de Almeida, members of Getúlio's personal guard, known to the public as the "Black Guard", which was created in May 1938, shortly after an attack by integralist supporters on the Catete Palace. When Vargas heard about the attack in Tonelero Street, he said: "Carlos Lacerda was shot in the foot. I was shot twice in the back!".

The political crisis that arose was severe because, in addition to the importance of Carlos Lacerda, the FAB, to which Major Vaz belonged, had Brigadier Eduardo Gomes of the UDN, whom Getúlio had defeated in the 1950 elections, as its great hero. The FAB set up a parallel investigation into the crime, which was nicknamed the "Republic of Galeão". On 8 August, the "Black Guard" was abolished.

Newspapers and radio stations ran headlines every day about the pursuit of the suspects. Alcino was captured on 13 August and Climério was caught on 17 August by Aeronautics Colonel Délio Jardim de Matos, who would later become Minister of Aeronautics. A novelty for the time, the helicopter, was even used in the hunt for the suspects.

Gregório Fortunato, head of President Getúlio Vargas' personal guard, was accused of ordering the assassination attempt on Lacerda; he later admitted it. In 1956, those accused of the crime were brought to a first trial; Gregório was sentenced to 25 years in prison as the mastermind, a sentence reduced to 20 years by Juscelino Kubitschek and 15 years by João Goulart. In 1962, he was murdered in Rio de Janeiro, inside the Lemos de Brito Penitentiary, by fellow inmate Feliciano Emiliano Damas.

=== Suicide ===
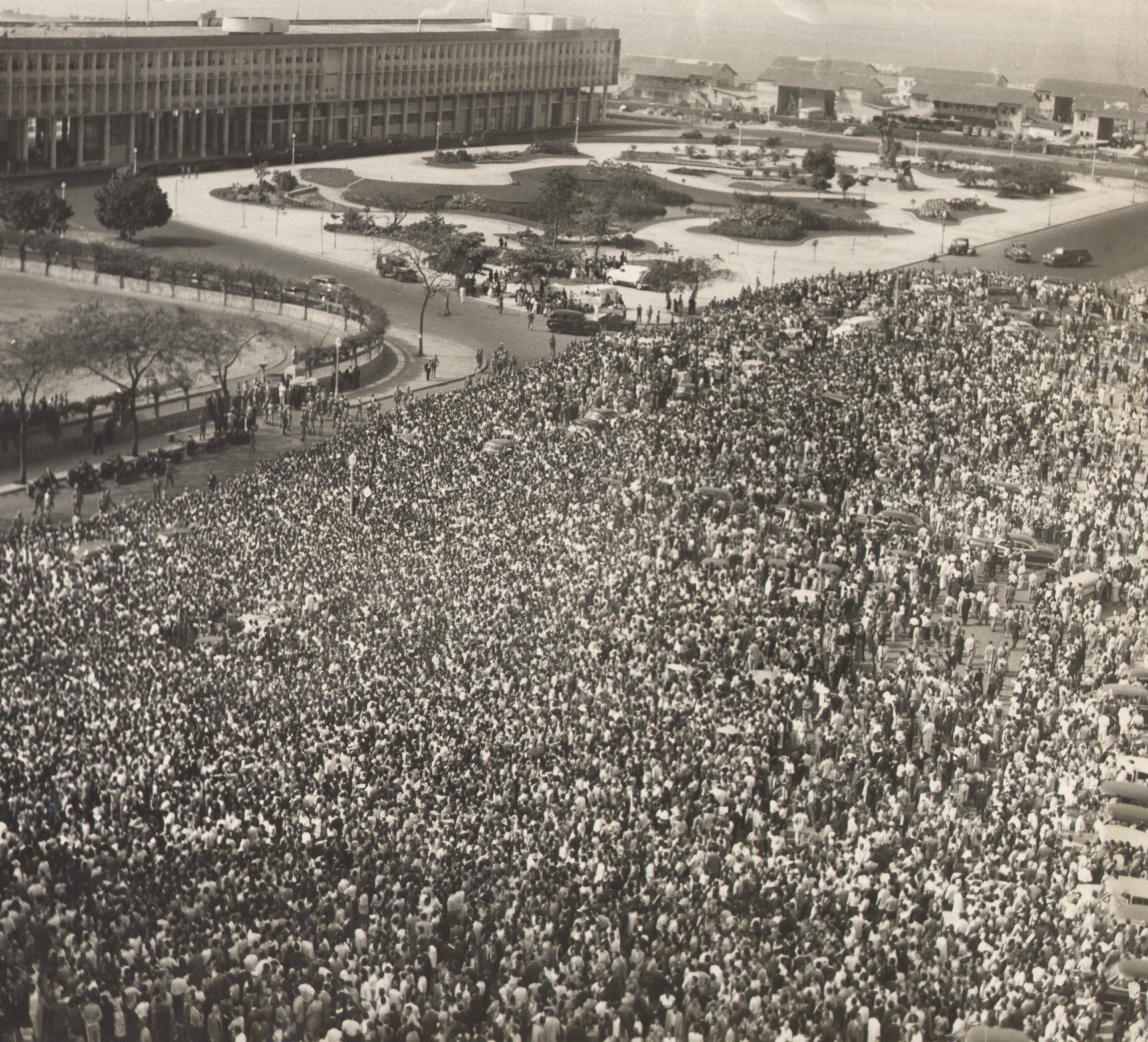
Procession of Vargas' body in Rio

On the morning of 24 August 1954, in the Catete Palace, Vargas shot himself in the chest and left a letter, the last part of which read: "...I fought against the exploitation of Brazil. I fought against the exploitation of the people. I have fought with my chest open. Hatred, infamy and slander have not dampened my spirits. I gave you my life. Now I offer you my death. I fear nothing. Serenely I take the first step on the road to eternity and leave life to enter history"; this document became known as the Carta Testamento.

The procession that accompanied Vargas's funeral to Santos Dumont Airport on 25 August, from where he flew to São Borja, drew a huge crowd. The reaction of the population was surprising, with public protests and the burning of opposition newspapers. Carlos Lacerda had to leave the country for fear of reprisals, and historians to this day debate whether his suicide postponed the military coup of 1964.

== See also ==
- Vargas Era
- Estado Novo
- Fourth Brazilian Republic
