= 1951 in Brazil =

Events in the year 1951 in Brazil.

== Incumbents ==
=== Federal government ===
- President:
  - Marshal Eurico Gaspar Dutra (until 30 January)
  - Getúlio Vargas (from 31 January)
- Vice President:
  - Nereu Ramos (until 30 January)
  - Café Filho (from 31 January)

=== Governors ===
- Alagoas:
  - Silvestre Pericles (until 31 January)
  - Arnon de Mello (from 31 January)
- Amazonas:
  - Leopoldo da Silva Amorim Neves (until 31 January)
  - Álvaro Botelho Maia (from 31 January)
- Bahia:
  - Otávio Mangabeira (until 31 January)
  - Régis Pacheco (from 31 January)
- Ceará:
  - Faustino de Albuquerque (until 31 January)
  - Raul Barbosa (from 31 January)
- Espírito Santo:
  - Carlos Fernando Monteiro Lindenberg (until 31 January)
  - Jones dos Santos Neves (from 31 January)
- Goiás:
  - Hosanah Guimarães (until 31 January)
  - Pedro Ludovico Teixeira (from 31 January)
- Maranhão:
  - Sebastião Archer (until 31 January)
  - Traiaú Rodrigues Moreira (from 31 January)
- Mato Grosso:
  - Jari Gomes (until 31 January)
  - Fernando Corrêa da Costa (from 31 January)
- Minas Gerais:
  - Milton Soares Campos (until 31 January)
  - Juscelino Kubitschek (from 31 January)
- Pará:
  - Alberto Engelhard (until 25 January: )
  - Waldir Bouhid (25 January-27 January)
  - Arnaldo Lobo (27 January-9 February)
  - Abel Nunes de Figueiredo (9 February-20 February)
  - Zacarias de Assumpção (from 20 February)
- Paraíba:
  - Osvaldo Trigueiro (until 31 January)
  - José Américo de Almeida (from 31 January)
- Paraná:
  - Moisés Lupion (until 31 January)
  - Bento Munhoz da Rocha Neto (from 31 January)
- Pernambuco:
  - Alexandre Barbosa Lima Sobrinho (until 31 January)
  - Agamenon Magalhães (from 31 January)
- Piauí:
  - José da Rocha Furtado (until 31 January)
  - Pedro Freitas (from 31 January)
- Rio de Janeiro:
  - Macedo Soares (until 31 January)
  - Amaral Peixoto (from 31 January)
- Rio Grande do Norte:
  - José Augusto Varela (until 31 January)
  - Jerônimo Dix-Sept Rosado (31 January-16 July)
  - Silvio Piza Pedrosa (from 16 July)
- Rio Grande do Sul:
  - Walter Só Jobim (till 31 January)
  - Ernesto Dornelles (from 31 January)
- Santa Catarina:
  - Aderbal Ramos da Silva (until 31 January)
  - Irineu Bornhausen (from 31 January)
- São Paulo:
  - Ademar de Barros (until 31 January)
  - Lucas Nogueira Garcez (from 31 January)
- Sergipe:
  - Jose Rollemberg (until 31 January)
  - João Dantas Martins dos Reis (31 January-17 February)
  - Edélzio Vieira de Melo (17 February-12 March)
  - Arnaldo Rollemberg Garcez (from 12 March)

=== Vice governors ===
- Alagoas:
  - Francisco de Menezes Pimentel (until 31 January)
  - Antônio Guedes de Miranda (from 31 January)
- Ceará: Stênio Gomes da Silva
- Espírito Santo:
  - José Rodrigues Sette (until 31 January)
  - Francisco Alves Ataíde (from 31 January)
- Goiás: Jonas Ferreira Alves Duarte (from 31 January)
- Maranhão:
  - Saturnino Bello (until 31 January)
  - Renato Bayma Archer da Silva (from 31 January)
- Mato Grosso: João Leite de Barros (from 31 January)
- Minas Gerais:
  - José Ribeiro Pena (until 31 January)
  - Clóvis Salgado da Gama (from 31 January)
- Paraíba:
  - José Targino Pereira da Costa (until 31 January)
  - João Fernandes de Lima (from 31 January)
- Piauí:
  - Osvaldo da Costa e Silva (until 31 January)
  - Tertuliano Milton Brandão (from 31 January)
- Rio de Janeiro: Tarcísio Miranda (from 31 January)
- Rio Grande do Norte:
  - Tomaz Salustino (until 31 January)
  - Sylvio Pedroza (31 January-16 July)
  - Vacant (from 16 July)
- São Paulo:
  - Luís Gonzaga Novelli Júnior (until 31 January)
  - Erlindo Salzano (from 31 January)
- Sergipe: Edelzio Vieira de Melo (from 31 January)

== Events ==
- date unknown
  - The Brazilian Medical Association is founded.
  - The Escola Superior de Propaganda e Marketing is founded in São Paulo.

=== January ===
- 18 January: Getúlio Vargas is proclaimed president-elect by the Superior Electoral Court.
- 13 January: Getúlio Vargas assumes his second term as the 17th President of Brazil, this time elected by direct vote.

=== March ===
- Unknown Date: Clarice Lispector returns from London with her husband, Maury Gurgel Valente, following a miscarriage.

=== June ===
- 12 June: Última Hora, a tabloid newspaper, is founded by Samuel Wainer and personally endorsed by President Vargas.

=== July ===
- 3 July: President Getúlio Vargas signs the Afonso Arinos Law, which prohibits racial discrimination in Brazil.
- 12 July: A Linhas Aéreas Paulistas plane collides with a tree located 3 kilometers from the runway at the Aracaju airport, killing 32 passengers and crew.

== Arts and culture ==
=== Books ===
- Ștefan Baciu - Analiza cuvântului dor

=== Films ===
- Agüenta Firme, Isidoro, directed by Luiz de Barros.
- Aí Vem o Barão, directed by Watson Macedo, starring Oscarito, José Lewgoy and Eliana.
- Amazon Symphony, directed by Anelio Latini, starring Almirante.
- Quando a Noite Acaba, starring Tônia Carrero.
- O Saci, directed by Rodolfo Nanni, starring Paulo Matozinho.

== Births ==
=== January ===
- 2 January:
  - Lula Ferreira, professional basketball coach
  - Waldir Peres, footballer (died 2017)

=== April ===
- 9 April: Sérgio Rezende, filmmaker
- 29 April: Vinicius Cantuária, jazz musician

=== July ===
- 12 July: Carlos Minc, geographer, environmentalist and politician

=== August ===
- 13 August: Beto Guedes, singer, songwriter, and guitarist
- 14 August: Rita Segato (in Argentina), anthropologist, feminist and academic

=== October ===
- 20 October: José Gomes Temporão, doctor and politician

== Deaths ==
=== August ===
- 2 August: Joseph Franz Seraph Lutzenberger, German-born architect and artist (born 1882)

=== November ===
- 13 November: Walter de Souza Goulart, footballer (born 1912)

== See also ==
- 1951 in Brazilian football
- List of Brazilian films of 1951
