= Effort to impeach Getúlio Vargas =

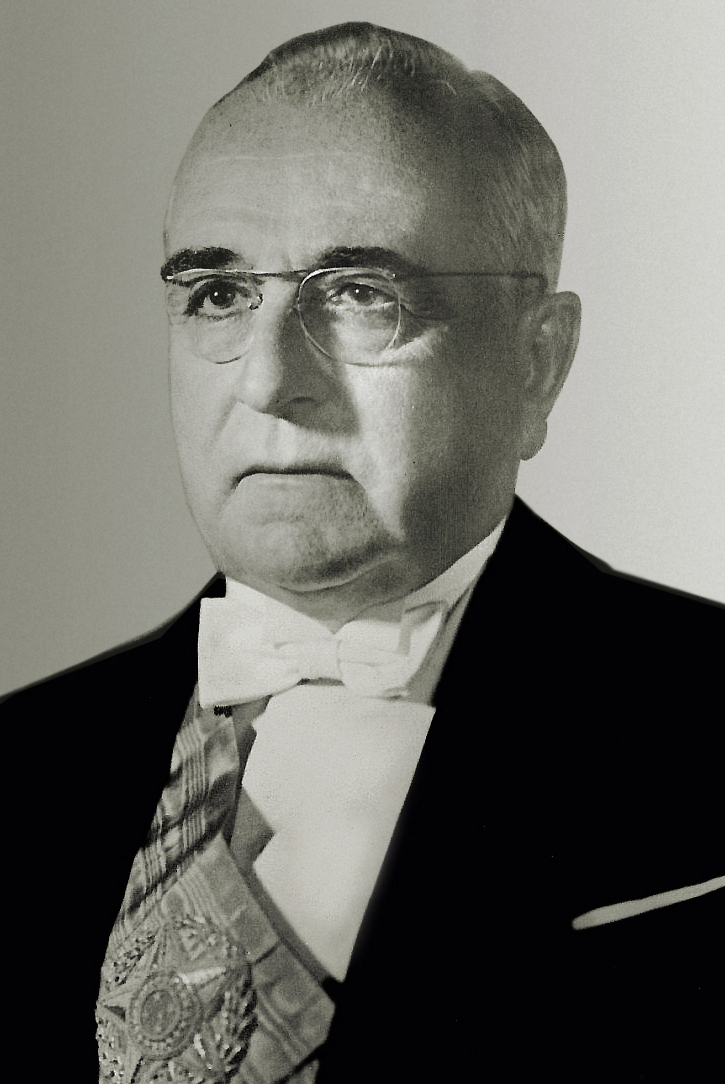
- Accused: Getúlio Vargas, President of Brazil
- Proponents: Wilson Leite Passos
- Date: 16 June 1954
- Outcome: Rejected by the Chamber of Deputies
- Charges: High crimes and misdemeanors
- Cause: Nomination of João Goulart for Minister of Labour; Increase of 100% in the minimum wage; Supposed attempt to install a "syndicalist republic"; Granting financial support from Bank of Brazil to newspaper Última Hora

Congressional votes

Voting in the Chamber of Deputies
- Accusation: Vote to open impeachment process
- Votes in favor: 35
- Votes against: 136
- Present: 40
- Not voting: 93
- Result: Rejected

The effort to impeach Getúlio Vargas was a process openly aiming to remove Getúlio Vargas from the Presidency of Brazil in 1954.

It was rejected by the Chamber of Deputies on 16 June 1954 in a vote of 136 to 35 with 40 abstentions. There were accusations of benefiting the newspaper Última Hora and attempting to install what was called a "syndicalist republic". Besides his victory in the process, he didn't conclude his term because, under pressure of the military and the attack against the opposition leader Carlos Lacerda, Vargas committed suicide on 24 August 1954. The Getulist coalition, being not so solid, had 57% of the Chamber.

== History ==
In 1953, there was a first impeachment attempt during the Última Hora Inquiry Commission, accusing Vargas of benefiting Samuel Wainer in obtaining financing with the Bank of Brazil.

In 1954, the opposition had many complaints to try to suspend him from presidency. In February, the Colonels Manifest was published, opposed to the minimum wage raise; in March, news broke of a secret agreement between presidents Vargas and Juan Perón for the creation of an ABC bloc (Argentina, Brazil and Chile), aiming to decrease the influence of the United States in the region. The political crisis increased and the possibility of a coup d'état, exclusive only for the fiercest oppositionists, such as journalist Carlos Lacerda and congressman Aliomar Baleeiro, spread through many spaces in the political debate, as the government lighted the yellow light in May, after the increase of the minimum wage, the increase of employees' taxes for social security and the assassination of journalist Nestor Moreira from A Noite, occurred in the 2nd Police District in Rio de Janeiro. In June, the impeachment request was formally filed in the Congress, being rejected in the same month by a broad margin.

== See also ==
- Impeachment of Fernando Collor
- Impeachment of Dilma Rousseff
