= 1954 in Brazil =

Events in the year 1954 in Brazil.

== Incumbents ==
=== Federal government ===
- President:
  - Getúlio Vargas (until August 24)
  - Café Filho (from August 24)
- Vice President:
  - Café Filho (until August 24)
  - Vacant (from August 24)

=== Governors ===
- Alagoas: Arnon de Mello
- Amazonas: Álvaro Botelho Maia
- Bahia: Régis Pacheco
- Ceará:
  - Raul Barbosa (from 1 July)
  - Stênio Gomes da Silva (until 31 July)
- Espírito Santo: Francisco Alves Ataíde
- Goiás: Pedro Ludovico Teixeira
- Maranhão: Eugênio Barros
- Mato Grosso: Fernando Corrêa da Costa
- Minas Gerais: Juscelino Kubitschek
- Pará: Zacarias de Assumpção
- Paraíba: José Américo de Almeida
- Paraná: Bento Munhoz da Rocha Neto
- Pernambuco: Etelvino Lins de Albuquerque
- Piauí: Pedro Freitas
- Rio de Janeiro: Amaral Peixoto
- Rio Grande do Norte: Silvio Piza Pedrosa
- Rio Grande do Sul: Ildo Meneghetti
- Santa Catarina: Irineu Bornhausen
- São Paulo: Lucas Nogueira Garcez
- Sergipe: Arnaldo Rollemberg Garcez

=== Vice governors ===
- Alagoas: Antônio Guedes de Miranda
- Ceará: Stênio Gomes da Silva (until 30 June)
- Espírito Santo: Francisco Alves Ataíde
- Goiás: Jonas Ferreira Alves Duarte (until 1 July)
- Maranhão: Renato Bayma Archer da Silva
- Mato Grosso: João Leite de Barros
- Minas Gerais: Clóvis Salgado da Gama
- Paraíba: João Fernandes de Lima
- Piauí:
  - Tertuliano Milton Brandão (until 25 March)
  - Francisco Ferreira de Castro (from 25 March)
- Rio de Janeiro:
  - Tarcísio Miranda (until 25 March)
  - Roberto Silveira (from 25 March)
- Rio Grande do Norte: Vacant
- São Paulo:
  - Erlindo Salzano (until 31 January)
  - Porfírio da Paz (from 31 January)
- Sergipe: Edelzio Vieira de Melo

== Events ==
=== August ===
- August 5: An assassination is attempted against journalist and politician Carlos Lacerda outside his home at 180 Rua Tonelero, where he and one of his bodyguards are injured. Air Force major Rubens Florentino (serving as Lacerda's bodyguard) is killed. That same day, further investigations uncover the involvement of a member of President Getúlio Vargas' security are involved in the assassination attempt.
- August 8: Gregório Fortunato, head of Vargas' personal security, confesses to masterminding the assassination attempt. The Air Force take charge of the investigations and Fortunato is apprehended.
- August 22: 19 Brazilian Army generals sign a manifesto demanding Vargas' resignation.
- August 23: President Vargas meets with his ministers to analyze the political crisis that arose after the attack. It is decided that Vargas will go on leave until the end of the investigations.
- August 24: The military do not accept Vargas' agreement and demand for his resignation. At the Catete Palace, President of Brazil Getúlio Vargas commits suicide by shooting himself in the heart. Vice President Café Filho becomes the 18th President of Brazil.

=== October ===
- October 3: Parliamentary elections are held in Brazil.

== Births ==
=== February ===
- February 19: Sócrates, footballer (d. 2011)

=== May ===
- May 20: João Batista Nunes, footballer
- May 28: João Carlos de Oliveira, athlete

=== June ===
- June 2:
  - Diana, singer
  - Mattos Nascimento, trombonist
- June 28: Daniel Dantas, actor

=== December ===
- December 24: Luís Carlos Melo Lopes, footballer
- December 25: João Justino Amaral dos Santos, footballer

== Deaths ==
- August 24: Getúlio Vargas, 14th and 17th President of Brazil

== See also ==
- 1954 in Brazilian football
- List of Brazilian films of 1954
