= Carta Testamento =

1954 letter by Getúlio Vargas before his suicide

Replica of the letter at Getúlio Vargas Square, in Nova Friburgo

The Carta Testamento (Brazilian Portuguese pronunciation: [ˈkaʁtɐ testaˈmẽtu], lit. 'Testament Letter') is a letter written by former Brazilian president Getúlio Vargas hours before his suicide, on August 24, 1954.

There is a handwritten suicide note from the “Testamentary Letter,”, of which three copies are known to exist and which was made public more.

== Background ==
On the night of 24 August 1954, president Vargas was thought to be partly responsible for the Rua Tonelero shooting, an assassination attempt against Carlos Lacerda, who was a leading voice opposing Vargas' policies. The suspicion was supported by the Brazilian Armed Forces and a sizeable portion of the public.

Upon receiving an ultimatum from the military demanding his resignation, Vargas went from his office into his bedroom and shot himself. He left a note, which was subsequently read to the crowds who had gathered at the presidential residence to demand his resignation, and over radio within an hour. The response was a spontaneous eruption of a supportive chant: "Getúlio, Getúlio! We want Getúlio!"

== See also ==
- Suicide note
