= Impeachment of Fernando Collor de Mello =

1992 impeachment of then-President of Brazil Fernando Collor

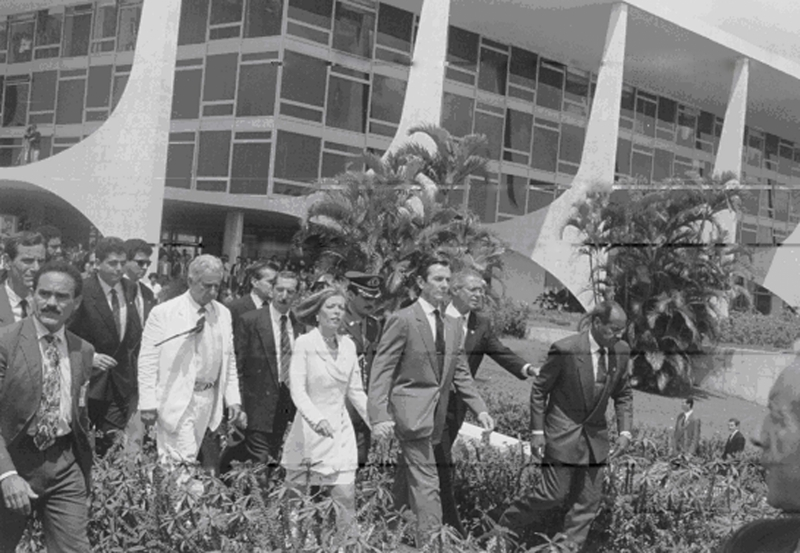
- Fernando Collor leaves the presidency.
- Accused: Fernando Collor de Mello, President of Brazil
- Date: 29 September 1992 – 29 December 1992 (3 months)
- Outcome: Concluded by impeachment on 29 December 1992; Consequences: Collor lost his political rights for 8 years and Vice-President Itamar Franco becomes President.
- Charges: Crime of liability

Congressional votes

Voting in the Chamber of Deputies committee
- Votes in favor: 16
- Votes against: 5
- Result: Approved

Voting in the Chamber of Deputies
- Votes in favor: 441
- Votes against: 38
- Not voting: 1
- Result: Approved

Voting in the Senate committee
- Votes in favor: 32
- Votes against: 1
- Not voting: 1
- Result: Approved

Voting in the Federal Senate
- Votes in favor: 76
- Votes against: 2
- Result: Approved

The impeachment of Fernando Collor de Mello, the 32nd president of Brazil, began on 29 September 1992, when the Chamber of Deputies approved the opening of impeachment procedures with 441 votes in favour. On 29 December 1992, when the trial began in the Federal Senate, Collor resigned in a letter read out by lawyer José Moura Rocha to avoid impeachment. However, the following day, Collor was sentenced to be disqualified from holding public office for eight years by 76 votes in favour and 2 against. It was Brazil's third impeachment trial; in 1955, Presidents Carlos Luz and Café Filho were also impeached.

During the political campaign for the 1989 elections, Paulo César Farias was treasurer of the presidential team of Fernando Collor de Mello and Itamar Franco. After the victory, PC Farias became involved in several areas of government and organized and led a huge corruption scheme. In an interview with Veja magazine in May 1992, Pedro Collor, the brother of the President, denounced Fernando Collor for being directly involved in the PC Farias Scheme. The investigation revealed that those involved collected around 15 million reais and spent more than a billion reais during Fernando Collor's government.

== Historical context ==
The 1989 presidential election, the first after the promulgation of the 1988 Federal Constitution, resulted in the victory of Fernando Collor de Mello (PRN-AL) over Luiz Inácio Lula da Silva (PT-SP). The campaign was characterized by the emotional tone used by the candidates and criticism of José Sarney's government. Collor, who called himself a "marajás hunter", a fighter against inflation and corruption and a "defender of the poor", advocated reducing the power of the federal government. In contrast, Lula presented himself to the population as an expert on workers' problems, especially because of his experience in the trade union movement, and supported the strong presence of the state in the economy.

In 1990, the federal government launched the Collor Plan, a set of measures aimed at containing inflation and stabilizing the economy. It consisted of two main projects: Collor Plan I, which included the confiscation of financial assets and a price freeze, and Collor Plan II, involving monetary reform and a more flexible price freeze. Although it initially reduced inflation, the plan caused the biggest recession in Brazilian history, which resulted in increased unemployment and company bankruptcies.

In a report published by Veja magazine on 13 May 1992, Pedro Collor de Mello accused Paulo César Farias, treasurer of Fernando Collor's presidential campaign, of articulating a corruption scheme involving influence trafficking, the allotment of public positions and the extraction of bribes within the government. The PC Farias Scheme would have benefited high-ranking members of the government and Fernando Collor. The following month, the National Congress set up a Parliamentary Inquiry Commission to investigate the case. During the inquiry process, Ana Acioli, Collor's secretary, and Francisco Eriberto, his former driver, testified to the commission, confirming the accusations and giving details of the scheme.

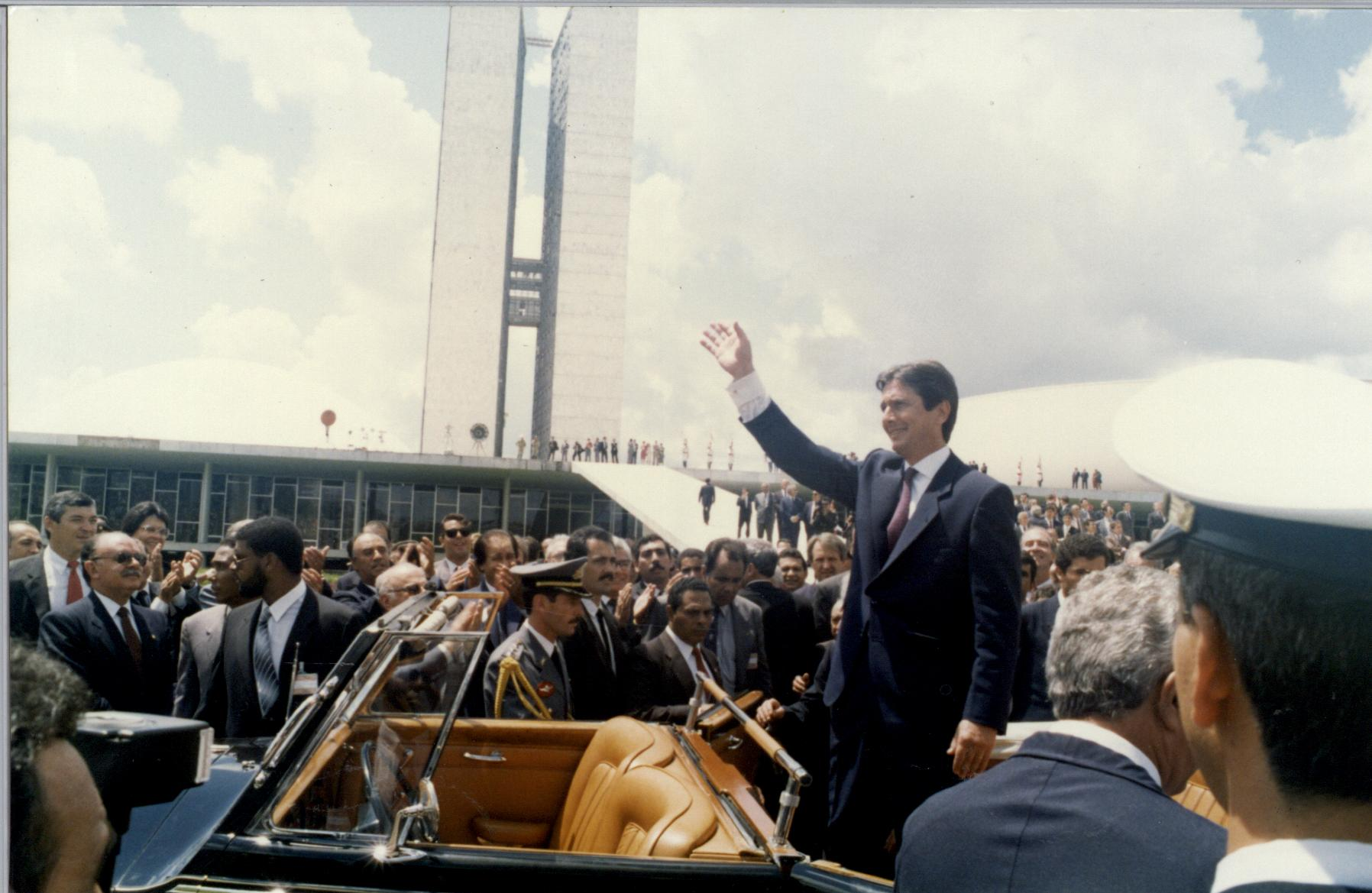
Inauguration of President Fernando Collor de Melo

One of the methods used by PC Farias involved opening fake accounts to wire money collected from bribes and transferred from the public coffers to Ana Acioli's accounts. In addition, expenses at the Casa da Dinda, Collor's official residence, were covered with funds from PC Farias' companies. Approved by 16 votes to 5, the committee's final report also concluded that Collor's and PC's accounts were not included in the 1990 confiscation. On 29 September 1992, the Chamber of Deputies approved the opening of impeachment proceedings against Collor by 441 votes in favor, 38 against, 1 abstention and 23 absent. On 1 October 1992, the impeachment process was instituted in the Federal Senate. The following day, Collor was removed from office. Vice-president Itamar Franco assumed temporary office and began to choose his ministerial team.

Fernando Collor's trial in the Federal Senate began on 29 December 1992. On the same day, he resigned in a letter read out by lawyer José Moura Rocha to avoid impeachment. The following day, Collor was sentenced by 76 votes to 2 against to be disqualified from holding public office for eight years.

In August 1992, during the committee's deliberations, the Brazilian population launched protests in favor of impeachment. The demonstrations were led by young people, who painted "Fora Collor" (English: "Collor Out") and "Impeachment Já" ("Impeachment Now") on their faces: this was the Caras-pintadas movement.

== Subsequent proceedings ==
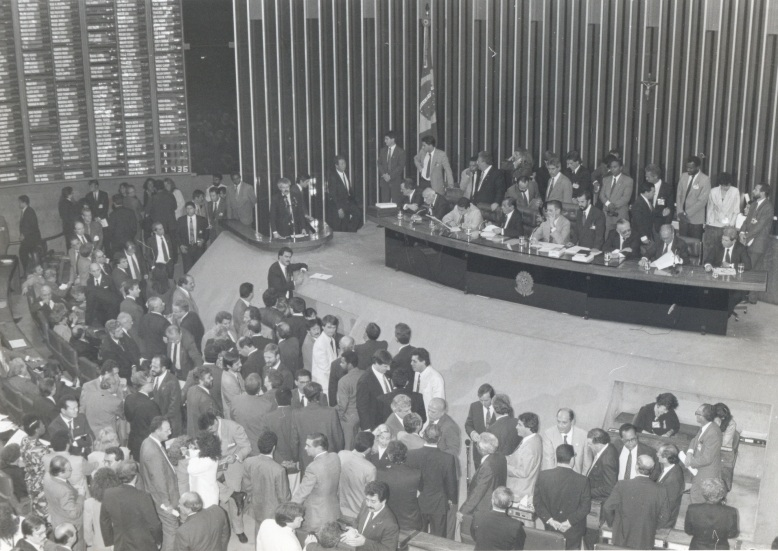
The president of the Chamber of Deputies, Ibsen Pinheiro, begins the vote on the impeachment request

Fernando Collor and eight other people were investigated for the crimes of passive corruption, active corruption, suppression of documents and forgery (Collor was only charged with the crime of passive corruption). In the indictment, Aristides Junqueira, Prosecutor General of the Republic, claimed that Collor used fake accounts to receive Cr$ 4.384.122.689,00 directly from companies linked to PC Farias. Collor argued that the money was the residue of campaign expenses, but later claimed that the funds had been obtained through a loan in Uruguay. In 1994, Collor and Paulo César Farias were acquitted of charges of passive corruption by the Supreme Court for lack of evidence; PC Farias was sentenced to seven years in prison for forgery.

A recording of a telephone conversation and PC's personal computer diskettes, considered crucial evidence, were disregarded by the court after being classified as illegal, as they were acquired during a police search and seizure without a warrant or judicial request for telephone interception. Other evidence collected from the files stored on PC's computer was also annulled after Collor's lawyer team invoked the doctrine of the fruit of the poisonous tree. Aristides Junqueira also pointed out the lack of an "act of office" perpetrated by Collor. In practice, the ministers' interpretation is that the crime could only be established when there was proof of the anticipation, omission or delay of a functional act due to an advantage received. In the case file, this was not duly proven.

In 1997, Fernando Collor filed a lawsuit asking for the annulment of the suspension of his political rights. According to Célio Silva, former advisor general of the Republic and Collor's lawyer, the 1992 impeachment process could not even have been initiated, as there is no law establishing the rules for judging crime of liability. In his opinion, Collor was convicted without valid proof. That same year, the seven ministers who took part in the trial voted unanimously to dismiss the appeal. In 1993, Collor had filed a petition with the Supreme Court asking for his ineligibility to be annulled, but his request was also rejected.

== Books by Fernando Collor ==
In 2007, Collor released the book Resgate da História – A verdade sobre o processo do impeachment , questioning the legality of the political criteria and the judicialization of the process and pointing out that the legal mechanism has been built with imperfections and arrogance by both politicians and anonymous people seeking notoriety. In 2016, he released Réplica para a História: uma catarse, a compilation of the material he spoke during the two impeachment processes he and Brazil went through in 1992 and 2016.

== See also ==
- Presidency of Collor de Mello
- Effort to impeach Getúlio Vargas
- Impeachment of Carlos Luz
- Impeachment of Dilma Rousseff
- Politics of Brazil
- History of Brazil
