= Alcino João do Nascimento =

Brazilian construction worker

- Nascimento in 1954
- Born: 3 July 1922; Itaperuna, Rio de Janeiro, Brazil
- Died: 18 January 2014 (aged 91); Mantenópolis, Espírito Santo, Brazil
- Occupation: Construction worker
- Known for: Rua Tonelero shooting

Alcino João do Nascimento (3 July 1922 – 18 January 2014) was a Brazilian construction worker. He gained notoriety for being one of the convicted for the assassination attempt of journalist and politician Carlos Lacerda, which became nationally known as the Rua Tonelero shooting.

== Biography ==
Alcino João do Nascimento was born in Itaperuna, Rio de Janeiro, one of the 12 children of José João do Nascimento and Leonídia Maria do Nascimento. In 1939, aged 17, he moved to Resplendor with a brother. There, he met Abigail Rabelo, whom he married (at the time, Abigail was 13 years old). Married, but unemployed, he went to Belo Horizonte to look for a job. At this moment, he began a good relationship with then mayor Juscelino Kubitschek, who hired him as construction worker of the city.

A little bit later, Juscelino presented Alcino to Gregório Fortunato, head of the personal security of president Getúlio Vargas, who looked for a man to work as detective. Even being called for this job, he worked as Vargas' personal barber and his family's nurse.

== Rua Tonelero shooting ==
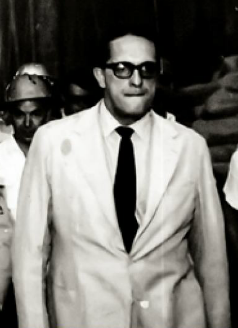
Carlos Lacerda, one of the leaders of the opposition against Getúlio Vargas

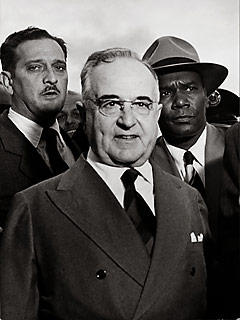
Getúlio Vargas and his personal security, commanded by Gregório Fortunato, on his left (right of the photo).

Lacerda, one of the main leaders of the opposition during Vargas administration, kicked off his campaign for the Chamber of Deputies. As he was threatened before, a group of supporters, Air Force officers, served as personal security during his rallies. After one of them, held at the night of 4 August 1954, in the courtyard of Colégio São José, the journalist went back home along with his son Sérgio, aged 15, in the car of Major Rubens Florentino Vaz. After arriving on Rua Tonelero, all of them hopped off the car and, during their farewell, a person came from the shadows and shot many times. The Air Force Major, unarmed, tried to defend, but was shot on the chest. Meanwhile, Lacerda took his son the garage of the building and returned shooting on the attacker, who fled in a taxi. A municipal guard nearby, Sálvio Romeiro, heard the shots and, after checking what was going on, was also shot, but could write down the license plate of the fled vehicle.

After cross-fire, Lacerda was shot on the foot, and Major Vaz, after being shot twice by a .45 caliber pistol (of exclusive use of the Brazilian Armed Forces), died heading to the hospital. Alcino stated that the assailant was Lutero Vargas, son of Getúlio Vargas and adversary of Carlos Lacerda. The Air Force high command assumed the investigations on 8 August, same that when Gregório Fortunato, accused to be the main assailant, confessed his participation. Climério Euribes de Almeida and Alcino João do Nascimento were arrested a little time later.

The attack triggered a political crisis that led to the suicide of Getúlio Vargas, with a shot on the heart, on 24 August 1954.

== Life after the attack ==
=== Trial and conviction ===
In 1956, Alcino went on trial and was convicted to 51 years in prison, 33 for his participation in the attack against Lacerda and 18 more for an armed robbery, which he was later acquitted in 1975.

Until his death, Alcino denied he was hired for the attack. He said he was sent to Rua Toneleiro to spy on Lacerda and make reports about his speeches as candidate for the National Congress. According to him: "Major Rubens Vaz saw me in front of Lacerda's building and began harassing me. He punched me and we began fighting. Then, a shot was heard, which hit him on the back, which came from a .38 caliber revolver that Lacerda carried."

=== Book ===
The book "Mataram o presidente! – memórias do pistoleiro que mudou a história do Brasil" ("The president was killed! – memories of a gunslinger who changed the history of Brazil"), launched after Alcino was released, brings his version about the night of 5 August 1954, during the attack.

=== Candidate for councillor ===
In 2012, aged 90, Alcino was candidate for city councillor of Mantenópolis, Espírito Santo. Member of the Workers' Party (PT), he was the oldest candidate of the state. He gained 7 votes (0.08% of the valid votes), not being elected.

=== Death ===
Nascimento died on 18 January 2014, aged 91.

== See also ==
- Politics of Brazil
- Rua Tonelero
