= Danuza Leão =

Brazilian socialite (1933–2022)

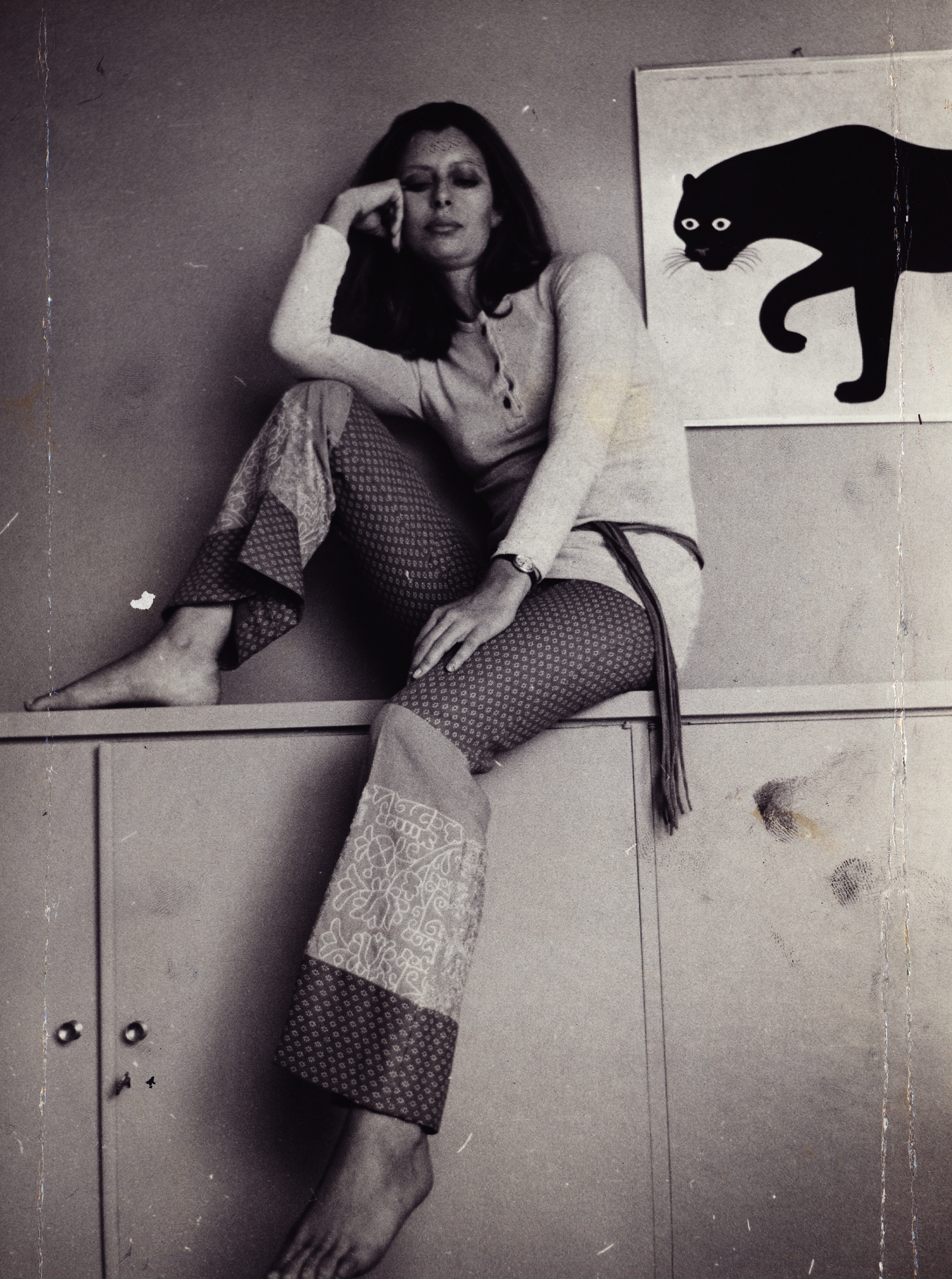
- Leão in 1969
- Born: Danuza Lofego Leão; July 26, 1933; Itaguaçu, Brazil
- Died: June 22, 2022 (aged 88); Rio de Janeiro, Brazil
- Occupation: Writer

Danuza Lofego Leão (July 26, 1933 – June 22, 2022) was a Brazilian model, socialite, journalist, writer, and actress.

== Career ==
She had a minor role in Glauber Rocha's 1967 FIPRESCI Award winning film Entranced Earth.

She has released several books.

She was a columnist for the Folha de S.Paulo newspaper for twelve years until she was fired in 2013, a few months after generating controversy by declaring in her column that New York was no longer fun when "even the porter" could travel, and that domestic servants were better off without the rights proposed by the "Domestic PEC".

== Personal life and death ==
She is the older sister of singer Nara Leão and was married to Samuel Wainer, founder of the newspaper Última Hora with whom she had three children: plastic artist Débora "Pinky" Wainer, film producer Bruno Wainer and journalist Samuel Wainer Filho, who died as a result of a car crash in 1984. Danuza died from respiratory failure in Rio de Janeiro on 22 June 2022 at the age of 88.

== Bibliography ==
- Na Sala com Danuza (In the Room with Danuza) - Editora Siciliano (1992)
- Quase Tudo (Almost Everything) — Companhia das Letras (2005)
- Danuza Leão Todo Dia (Danuza Leão Everyday) - Editora Siciliano (1994)
- De Malas Prontas (Packed) — Companhia das Letras (2008)
- Fazendo as Malas (Packing) — Companhia das Letras (2009)
- É Tudo Tão Simples (Everything's so Simple) — Editora Agir (2012)
