= List of Brazilian films of 1951 =

A list of films produced in Brazil in 1951:

Title	Director	Cast	Genre	Notes
A Beleza do Diabo	Romain Lesage	Gloria Blenner, Augusto Franco, Célio Gonçalves	Drama	
Agüenta Firme, Isidoro	Luiz de Barros	Nicolau Guzzardi, Nelma Costa, Deleo Júnior	Musical comedy	
Aí Vem o Barão	Watson Macedo	Oscarito, José Lewgoy, Eliana	Comedy	
Amazon Symphony	Anelio Latini	Almirante, Jaime Barcellos, Sadi Cabral	Animation	
Ângela	Tom Payne, Abilio Pereira de Almeida	Eliane Lage, Alberto Ruschel, Mário Sérgio	Romantic drama	
Anjo do Lodo	Luiz de Barros	Virgínia Lane, Cláudio Nonelli, Manoel Vieira	Drama	
Coração Materno	Gilda de Abreu	Gilda de Abreu, Elizeth Cardoso, Amadeu Celestino	Drama	
Corações na Sombra	Guido Lazzarini	Dionísio Azevedo, Danilo de Oliveira, Silvia Fernanda	Drama	
Hóspede de Uma Noite	Ugo Lombardi	Leda Barbosa, Carlos Cotrim, Newton Couto	Drama	
Liana, a Pecadora	Antonio Tibiriçá	Nair Bello, Wanda Cabral, Hebe Camargo	Drama	
Maior Que o Ódio	José Carlos Burle	Anselmo Duarte, Ilka Soares, José Lewgoy	Drama	
Maria da Praia	Paulo Wanderley	Dirce Belmonte, Irapuã Brasil, Adalberto Carvalho	Drama	
Meu Dia Chegará	Gino Talamo	Theresa Amayo, Augusto Aníbal, Terezinha Araújo	Drama	
Milagre de Amor	Moacyr Fenelon	Fada Santoro, Paulo Porto, Rosângela Maldonado	Comedy	
O Comprador de Fazendas	Alberto Pieralisi	Procópio Ferreira, Henriette Morineau, Hélio Souto	Comedy	
O Falso Detetive	José Cajado Filho	Arnaldo Coutinho, Hélio de Soveral, Iris Delmar	Comedy	
O Saci	Rodolfo Nanni	Otávio Araújo, Aristéia Paula de Souza, Raimundo Duprat	Family adventure	
Presença de Anita	Ruggero Jacobbi	Antonieta Morineau, Orlando Villar, Vera Nunes	Romantic drama	
Strange World	Franz Eichhorn	Angelika Hauff, Helmuth Schneider, America Cabral	Adventure	
Suzana e o Presidente	Ruggero Jacobbi	Vera Nunes, Orlando Villar, Leônidas da Silva	Comedy	
Terra É Sempre Terra	Tom Payne	Marisa Prado, Mário Sérgio, Abilio Pereira de Almeida	Drama	
Tocaia	Euripides Ramos	Oswaldo Carvalho, João Celestino, Alberto Cruz	Adventure	
Vento Norte	Salomão Scliar	Roberto Bataglin, Patrícia Diniz, Manoel Macedo	Drama	

== See also ==
- 1951 in Brazil
- 1957 in film
