= Jerônimo Dix-Huit Rosado =

Brazilian politician

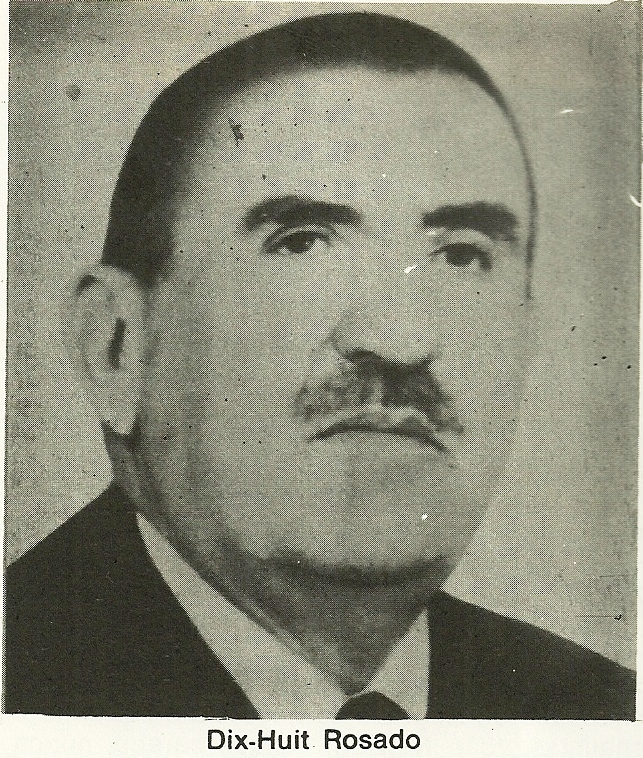

Jerônimo Dix-Huit Rosado Maia (May 21, 1912 – October 22, 1996) was a Brazilian politician born in the city of Mossoró, in the state of Rio Grande do Norte.

== Biography ==
Jerônimo Dix-huit Rosado Maia was born in Mossoró, Rio Grande do Norte on May 21, 1912, he was the eighteenth child of pharmacist Jerônimo Ribeiro Rosado, and his second wife, Isaura Rosado Maia. Dix-huit means "eighteen" in French, since his father had the eccentric custom of numbering his children with French numbers.

In 1935, Rosado graduated in medicine from the Faculty of Medicine of Bahia.

== Political career ==
Lieutenant Colonel and Health Head of the Military Police of Rio Grande do Norte, Jerônimo Dix-huit was the first of his family to enter politics in 1945 as a state representative, during which his older brother Dix-sept was elected mayor of Mossoró. Rosado also served two mandates of federal deputy in 1950 and 1954. Elected senator in 1958, he held the office from 1959 to 1966, during which visited some communist countries, on official business. Even in the sixties, Rosado was appointed by President Costa e Silva to chair the INDA - National Institute of Agrarian Development - period when implanted in his homeland the ESAM - Agronomy School of Mossoró - with the course of Agronomy, today UFERSA - Federal Rural University of the Semi Arid - offering various courses, and Agronomy, Veterinary Medicine, Law, Civil Engineering, Fishing Engineering and many others. Elected mayor of Mossoró in three terms - 1972, 1982 and 1992. He married Nayde Medeiros and they had six children: Liana Maria, Mario, Margarida, Maria Cristina, Nayde Maria and Carlos Antonio.

Rosado died in 1996, during his third term as mayor of Mossoró, being replaced by his niece, deputy mayor Sandra Rosado.
