= Vicente Rao =

Brazilian jurist

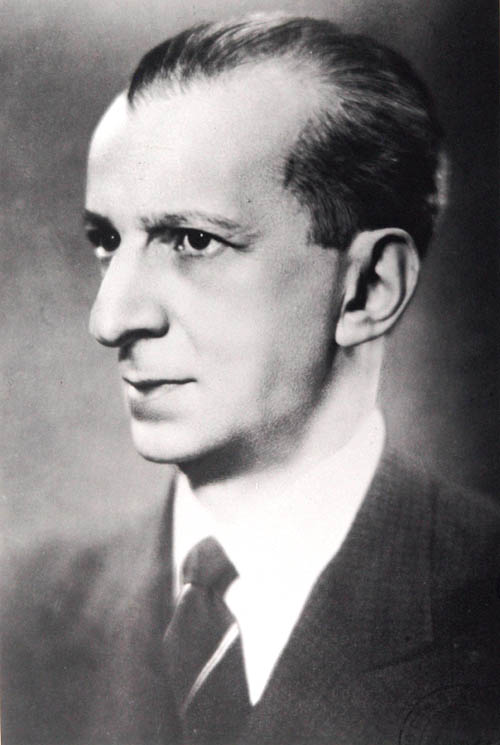
- Born: June 16, 1892; São Paulo, São Paulo (state), Brazil
- Died: January 19, 1978 (aged 85); São Paulo, São Paulo (state), Brazil
- Citizenship: Brazilian
- Education: Faculty of Law of São Paulo
- Occupations: Lawyer, professor, politician, writer
- Notable work: O Direito e a vida dos direitos (1952)

Vicente Paulo Francisco Rao (June 16, 1892 – January 19, 1978) was a Brazilian lawyer, professor, intellectual, and politician. He served as Minister of Justice from 1934 to 1937 and as Minister of Foreign Affairs from 1953 to 1954.

== Biography ==
Born in São Paulo to Italian immigrants, Rao graduated from the Faculty of Law of São Paulo in 1912, and soon began his career as a lawyer. He was one of the founding members of the classical liberal Democratic Party, which rivalled the then-dominant Paulista Republican Party. He supported the Revolution of 1930, led by Getúlio Vargas, but, disillusioned, he took part in the Constitutionalist Revolution of 1932, which demanded greater political autonomy for the state of São Paulo as well as the elaboration of a new Constitution. With the defeat of the movement, Rao was exiled to France.

Following his return to Brazil, Rao contributed to the foundation of the University of São Paulo, where he became professor, and was appointed Minister of Justice under Getúlio Vargas. Rao's tenure was marked by relentless repression of political opponents, especially communists. In 1936, he co-signed the order of extradition of communist militant Olga Benário Prestes, who was sent to Nazi Germany and six years later died in a concentration camp.

With the installation of the Estado Novo dictatorship, Rao was targeted by State persecution for his critiques of Getúlio Vargas. As a result, he removed from his position as a professor at the Faculty of Law of São Paulo.

As an academic, Rao wrote extensively on civil and Roman law, particularly contracts, as well as the theory of law.

In 1953, Rao was appointed Minister of Foreign Affairs under Getúlio Vargas' second presidency. He contributed to the consolidation of the Organization of American States.
