= List of Brazilian films of 1954 =

A list of films produced in Brazil in 1954:

Title	Director	Cast	Genre	Notes
A Outra Face do Homem	J. B. Tanko	Sadi Cabral, Edilene Cavalcanti, Wilma Chandler	Drama	
A Sogra	Armando Couto	Procópio Ferreira, Maria Vidal, Ludy Veloso	Comedy	
Candinho	Abilio Pereira de Almeida	Amácio Mazzaropi, Marisa Prado, Ruth de Souza	Comedy	
Carnaval em Caxias	Paulo Wanderley	Carmélia Alves, Ariston, Dircinha Batista	Musical comedy	
Chamas no cafezal	José Carlos Burle	Jane Batista, José Carlos Burle, Áurea Cardoso	Drama	
Conchita und der Ingenieur	Franz Eichhorn, Hans Hinrich	Paul Hartmann, Vanja Orico, Robert Freitag	Adventure	
Destino em Apuros	Ernesto Remani	João Alberto, João Alberto, Arrelia	Comedy	
É Proibido Beijar	Ugo Lombardi	Tônia Carrero, Mário Sérgio, Zbigniew Ziembinski	Comedy	
Floradas na Serra	Luciano Salce	Cacilda Becker, Jardel Filho, Ilka Soares	Drama	
O Circo Chegou à Cidade	Alberto Severi	Badu, Gonzaga Blota, Humberto Catalano	Adventure	
O Petróleo é Nosso	Watson Macedo	Violeta Ferraz, Humberto Catalano, Adelaide Chiozzo	Comedy	
Perdidos de Amor	Euripides Ramos	Theresa Amayo, Luiz Bonfá, Miriam Carmem	Drama	
Malandros em Quarta Dimensão	Luiz de Barros	Mara Abrantes, Julie Bardot, Irene Bertal	Musical comedy	
Marujo Por Acaso	Euripides Ramos	Ankito, Heloísa Helena, Afonso Stuart	Comedy	
Matar ou Correr	Carlos Manga	Oscarito, Grande Otelo, José Lewgoy	Comedy	
Paixão Tempestuosa	Antonio Tibiriçá	Vida Alves, Sônia Campos, Tânia Castilho	Drama	
Rei do Movimento	Victor Lima, Hélio Barroso	Ankito, Janete Jane, Carlos Tovar	Musical comedy	
Road to Crime	Flaminio Bollini	Marly Bueno, Nelson Camargo, Miro Cerni	Crime	
Rua Sem Sol	Alex Viany	Glauce Rocha, Carlos Cotrim, Dóris Monteiro	Drama	
Woman of Truth	Alberto Cavalcanti	Carlos Araújo, Adoniran Barbosa, Inezita Barroso	Drama	

== See also ==
- 1954 in Brazil
