= Rua Tonelero =

Street in Rio de Janeiro, Brazil

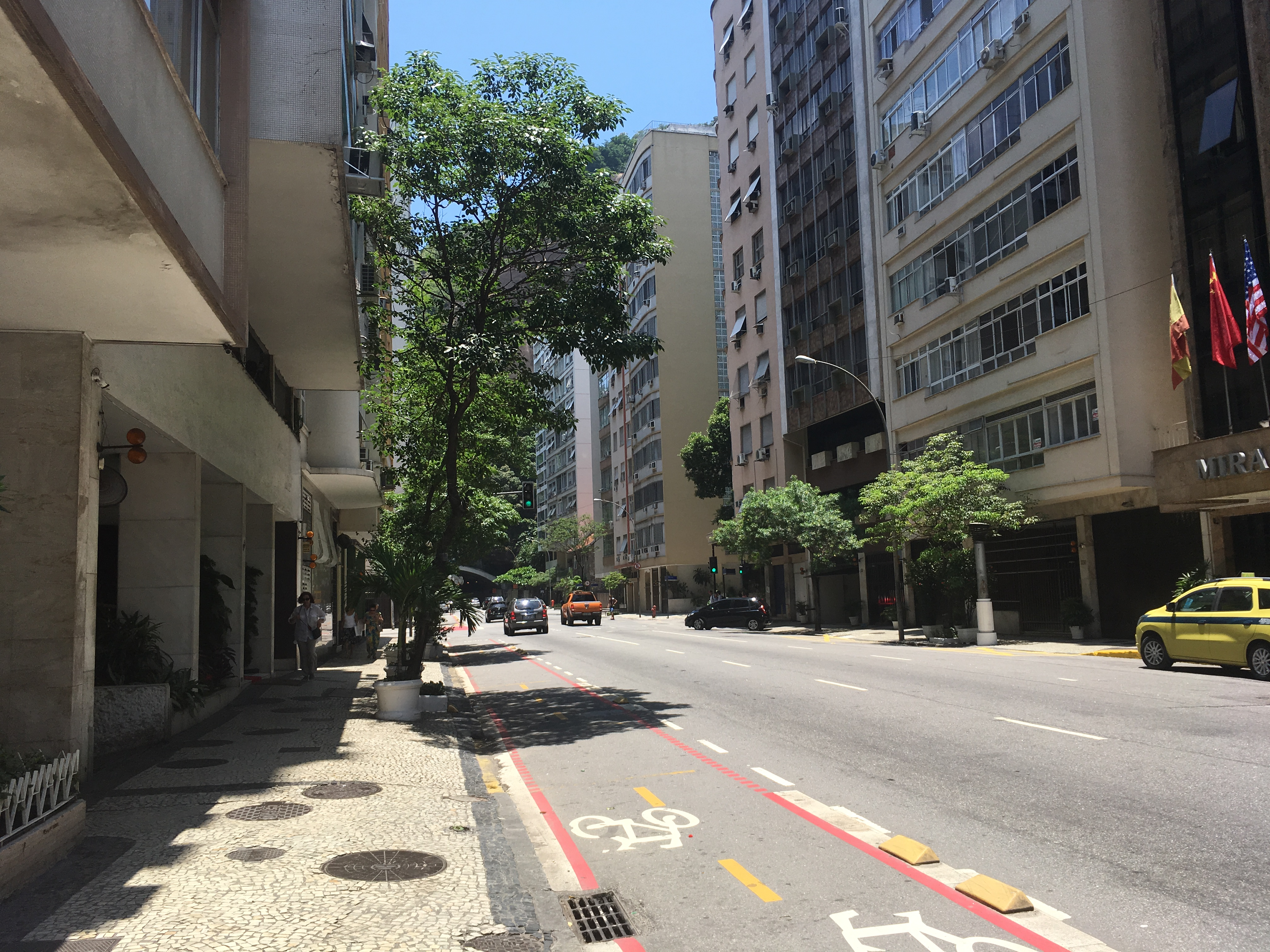
- Rua Tonelero in 2018
- Location: Copacabana, Rio de Janeiro, Brazil
- Nearest metro station: Siqueira Campos and Cardeal Arcoverde (Line 1 – Orange)

Tonelero is a street located in the neighborhood of Copacabana in the city of Rio de Janeiro, Brazil. It is named after the Battle of the Tonelero Pass. The Siqueira Campos and Cardeal Arcoverde stations of Line 1 of the Rio de Janeiro Metro are accessible from this street.

== 1954 attack ==
Rua Tonelero attack

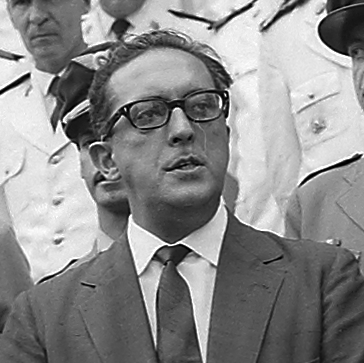
Carlos Lacerda, the target of the operation, was injured during the attack

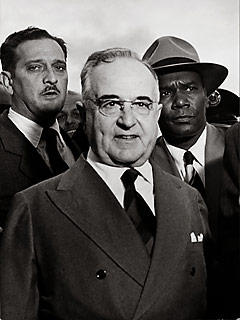
Gregório Fortunato (right), the chief security guard of President Getúlio Vargas (center), was sentenced for his involvement in the crime

Rua Tonelero gained historical significance due to the Rua Tonelero shooting, which took place on 5 August 1954, at 12:30 AM, at number 180 of the street. In an attempt to assassinate publishing executive and politician Carlos Lacerda, perpetrator, Alcino João do Nascimento, fatally shot his bodyguard, Major Rubens Vaz, wounded security guard, Sálvio Romeiro, and injured Lacerda with a shot in the foot.

A member of the National Democratic Union, Lacerda was one of the key political adversaries of President Vargas, who had previously ruled as a dictator from 1930 to 1945, and mounted a strong opposition campaign against the president through his newspaper, Tribuna da Imprensa.

An investigation following the incident found that Nascimento, a professional carpenter, had been a hired gun for Climério Euribes de Almeida, who accompanied him during the crime and was only identified later. At the time Almeida was a member of Getúlio Vargas's official security detail, as well as a friend of Vargas's chief bodyguard Gregório Fortunato. Upon questioning, Nascimento named Vargas's son Lutero Vargas as the orchestrator of the shooting. On 8 August 1954, Fortunato confessed to his involvement in the crime. Fortunato, Nascimento and Almeida were all sentenced afterwards.

The Tonelero shooting escalated the political crisis that led to calls for Vargas to resign, and which culminated in his suicide by gunshot on 24 August 1954.

== Gallery ==
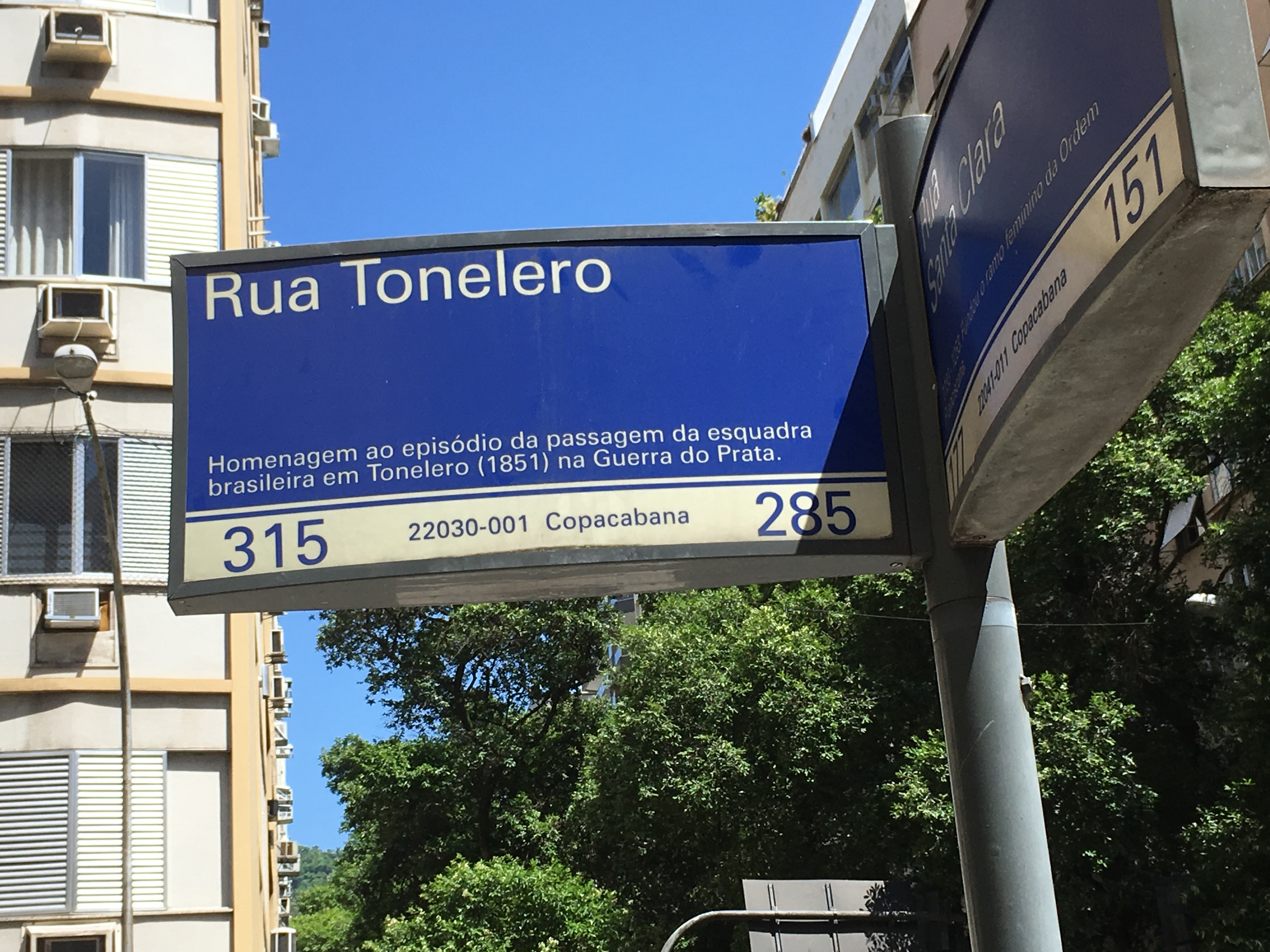
Street sign on the corner of Tonelero and Rua Santa Clara

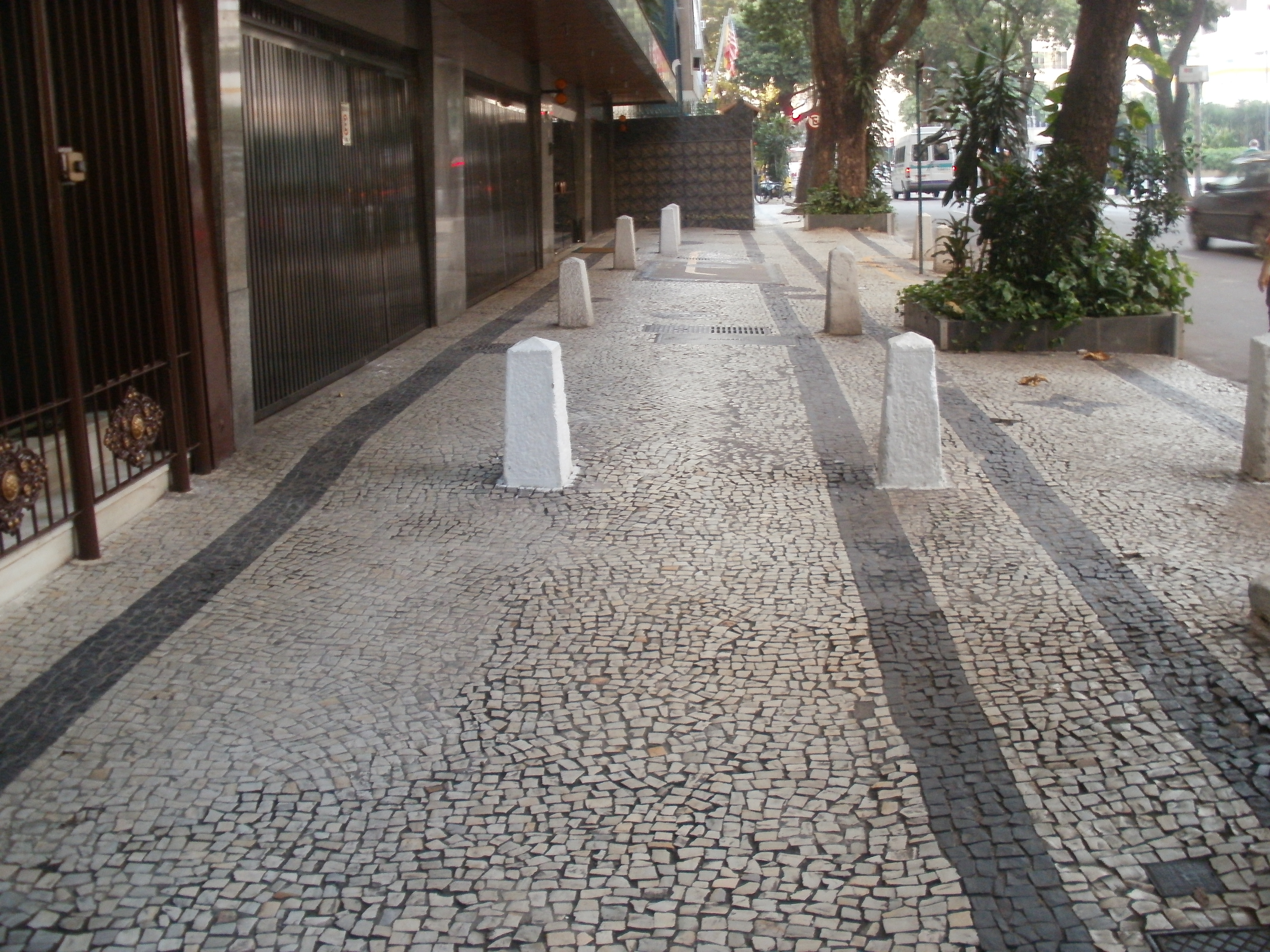
Street sidewalk in 2011
