= Jerônimo Dix-Sept Rosado =

Brazilian politician (1911–1951)

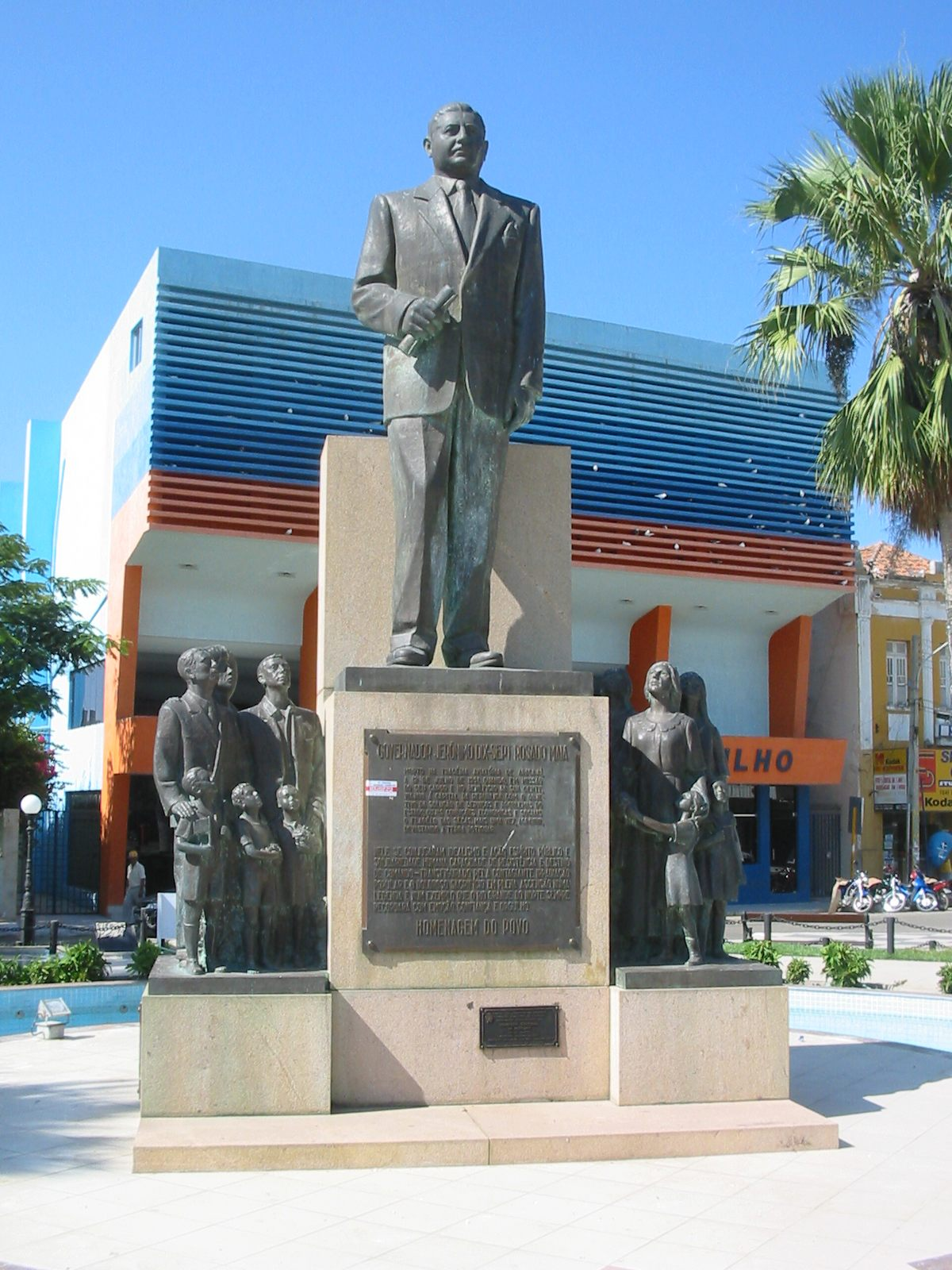
Statue of Jerônimo Dix-Sept Rosado in Mossoró.

Jerônimo Dix-Sept Rosado Maia (March 25, 1911 – July 12, 1951) was a Brazilian politician, mayor of Mossoró and governor of Rio Grande do Norte state in Brazil.

== Early years ==
Born March 25, 1911, in Mossoró, Rosado showed interest in the mechanics of machinery and automotive engines: a passion that remained even when he took political and social positions of prominence.

He was the seventeenth child of pharmacist Jerônimo Ribeiro Rosado, and his second wife, Isaura Rosado Maia. Dix-sept means 'seventeen' in French, since his father had the eccentric custom of numbering their children with French numbers. He was the older brother of Jerônimo Dix-Huit Rosado, also a mayor of Mossoró.

Soon after his father's death, he became the leader of the family, commanding and expanding the gypsum business for 18 years. As a result, the gypsum business grew, a road and fluvial transport company was opened, the mining Jerônimo Rosado opened national borders, Mossoró Comercial e Navegação Ltda. diversified its activities into insurance, aviation, air cargo, and salt transport.

== Political career ==
Rosado came to municipal power on March 31, 1948, beating his opponent Sebastião Fernandes with 4,428 votes against 2,992 for Fernandes.

He was elected governor of Rio Grande do Norte in 1950, receiving a majority of over 33,242 votes on Manoel Varela.

Rosado died in a plane crash on July 12, 1951, less than a year after becoming governor. This generated commotion in the state. He was buried in Alecrim Cemetery in Natal.
