= Caçapava (footballer) =

Brazilian footballer (1954-2016)

- Born: Luís Carlos Melo Lopes; December 24, 1954; Caçapava do Sul, Rio Grande do Sul, Brazil
- Died: June 27, 2016 (aged 61)
- Other name: Caçapava
- Years active: 1972-1987
- Known for: Football player

Luís Carlos Melo Lopes (December 24, 1954 – June 27, 2016), better known as Caçapava, was a Brazilian football player in defensive midfielder role. He made two appearances for the Brazil national team from 1976 to 1977.

== Clubs ==
- Gaúcho de Caçapava: 1972
- Internacional: 1973–1979.
- Corinthians: 1979 - 1982.
- Palmeiras: 1982 - 1983.
- Vila Nova: 1983.
- Ceará: 1984 - 1985.
- Novo Hamburgo: 1984.
- Fortaleza: 1986 - 1987.

== Honours ==
- Campeonato Gaúcho: Four time (1974, 1975, 1976 and 1978)
- Campeonato Brasileiro Série A: (1975, 1976)
- Campeonato Paulista: 1979.
- Campeonato Cearense: 1984.
