= Wilson Leite Passos =

Brazilian politician (1926–2016)

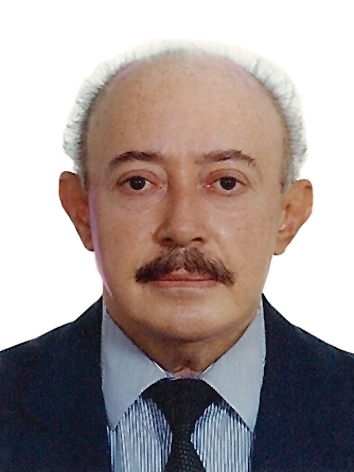

City Councillor of the Municipal Chamber of Rio de Janeiro
- In office 1982–2008

Member of the Chamber of Deputies
- In office June 1996 – December 1996

Personal details
- Born: Wilson Leite Passos; 19 December 1926 Rio de Janeiro, Federal District, Brazil
- Died: 17 September 2016 (aged 89) Rio de Janeiro, Brazil
- Spouse: Maria Rocha
- Profession: Journalist; Politician

Wilson Leite Passos (Rio de Janeiro, December 19, 1926 - Rio de Janeiro, September 17, 2016) was a Brazilian politician who authored the impeachment request of former president Getúlio Vargas.

He created the Municipal Eugenics Service, which operated from 1956 to 1975, offering pre-nuptial, pre- and post-natal exams and psychological guidance to couples. With the eugenics bill, he proposed creating tax and educational privileges for families with healthy parents and children, instead of those with someone with a physical or mental disability or an incurable disease. The initiative, compared to the development of the pure race advocated by Adolf Hitler, was never approved.

== Biography ==
Son of Jaime Pedreira Passos and Lealdina Ferrão Muniz Leite Passos, he had degrees in administration and public relations. In 1944, he began his career in journalism, working for Correio da Manhã and A Notícia. In 1945, he became involved in the presidential campaign of Brigadier Eduardo Gomes and, in the same year, was one of the founders of the National Democratic Union (UDN). An active participant in the campaign for the state monopoly of oil in 1947 and 1948, from 1949 to 1950 he organized and led the "National Popular Movement for Eduardo Gomes", which promoted the brigadier's second presidential candidacy. With the support of UDN leaders, he was the author of the impeachment request for President Getúlio Vargas in 1954. In October, he was elected city councilor in Rio de Janeiro by the UDN. Re-elected in October 1958, with a mandate until 1962, when the City Council was dissolved due to the creation of the state of Guanabara, as a result of the change of the federal capital to Brasília. A supporter of the military coup of March 31, 1964, he joined the National Renewal Alliance (Arena). He joined the Democratic Social Party (PDS) due to the end of bipartisanship and the consequent party restructuring, and was elected councilman once again to the Rio de Janeiro City Council in 1982, 1988 — the year in which he was involved in one of the biggest controversies of those two years, when he debated in a plenary session how many “sex scenes” would define a film as pornographic — and 1992.

In April 1993, he joined the Reform Progressive Party (PPR) and, in October 1994, he ran for federal deputy, but was defeated. Suspicions of fraud at the Regional Electoral Court of Rio de Janeiro (TRE/RJ) annulled the election and ordered a new election in November, obtaining the first alternate candidate. Affiliated with the Brazilian Progressive Party (PPB), he took office in the Federal Chamber in June 1996, serving until December. In October 1996, he was elected councilor again, beginning a new term in January 1997.

His last term as a councilor ended in 2008, and he tried to be reelected in 2012, without success. He was also a candidate for federal deputy in 2010, through the coalition O Rio De Janeiro Pode Mais (PPS / DEM / PSDB) and the Democratas party (DEM), in the state of Rio de Janeiro, without success, obtaining only 4,006 votes, representing 0.05%.

At the age of 89, he died in his hometown. He had lung cancer and was hospitalized for about two weeks before dying.
