= Brazilian Medical Association =

Revista da Associação Médica Brasileira
- Discipline: Medicine
- Language: Portuguese

Publication details
- Publisher: Elsevier

Standard abbreviations
- ISO 4: Rev. Assoc. Méd. Bras.

Indexing
- ISSN: 2255-4823

The Brazilian Medical Association (Portuguese: Associação Médica Brasileira) founded in 1951, is the national class association of physicians in Brazil. With more than 140,000 associates, it is the second largest in the Americas, just after the American Medical Association. Its official journal, Revista da Associação Médica Brasileira, is published by Elsevier.
