= Rua Tonelero shooting =

1954 assassination attempt in Rio de Janeiro, Brazil

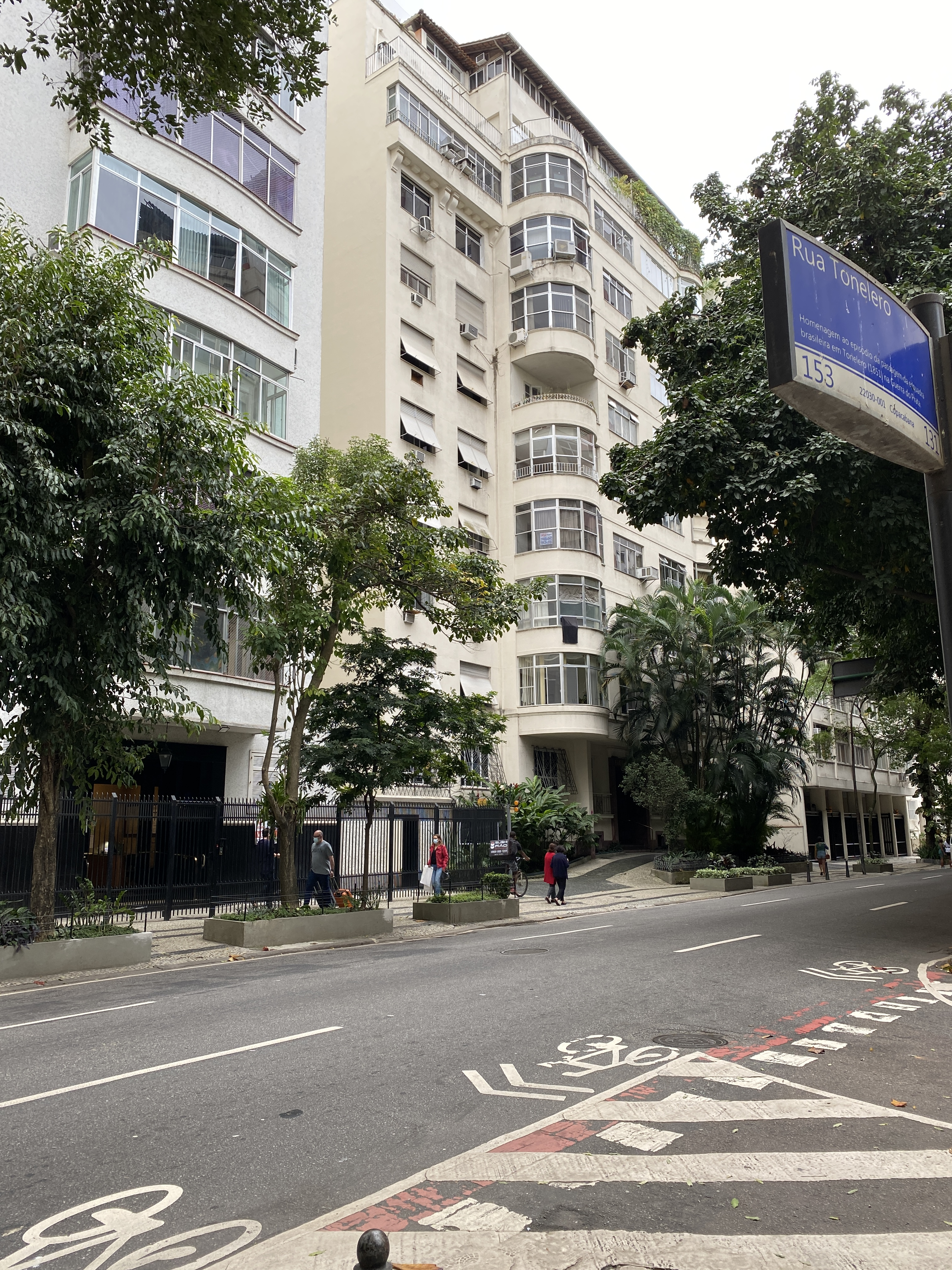
- Rua Tonelero in 2021. The number 180 is the building in the middle of the photo.
- Location: Rua Tonelero, 180; Copacabana, Rio de Janeiro, Brazil
- Date: 5 August 1954
- Target: Carlos Lacerda
- Attack type: Assassination attempt
- Weapon: .45 ACP pistol
- Deaths: 1
- Injuries: 2
- Assailants: Alcino João do Nascimento; Gregório Fortunato; Climério Euribes de Almeida; José Antônio Soares; Nelson Raimundo
- No. of participants: 5
- Convictions: Nascimento and Almeida convicted to 33 years in prison; Fortunato convicted to 25 years in prison; Soares convicted to 26 years in prison; Raimundo convicted to 11 years in prison

The Rua Tonelero shooting was a politically motivated attack which aimed to assassinate the journalist and politician Carlos Lacerda. The attack occurred on the night of 5 August 1954, in front of Lacerda's residence at Rua Tonelero, 180, in Copacabana, Rio de Janeiro, Brazil. The attack led to the death of Air Force Major Rubens Florentino Vaz and wounded municipal guard Sálvio Romeiro.

It gained historic significance for being a landmark in the fall of then President Getúlio Vargas, leading to his suicide 19 days later.

== Attack ==
Lacerda, one of the main leaders of the opposition during Vargas administration, kicked off his campaign for the Chamber of Deputies. As he was threatened before, a group of supporters, Air Force officers, served as personal security during his rallies. After a rally held on the night of 4 August 1954 in the courtyard of Colégio São José, the journalist went back home along with his 15-year old son, Sérgio, in the car of Major Rubens Florentino Vaz. After arriving on Rua Tonelero, once they all got out of the car to say their farewells, a gunman emerged from the darkness and shot at the group many times. Air Force Major Vaz tried to defend but was shot on the chest. Meanwhile, Lacerda took cover with his son in an adjacent garage and returned fire at the attacker, who fled in a taxi. Sálvio Romeiro, a local guard who heard the gunfire, came to investigate but was also shot; he was, however, able to write down the license plate of the escape vehicle.

== Investigation ==
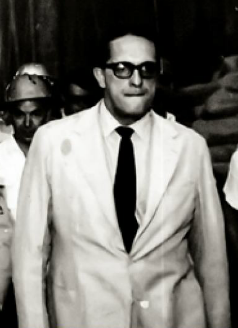
Carlos Lacerda, one of the leaders of the opposition against Getúlio Vargas

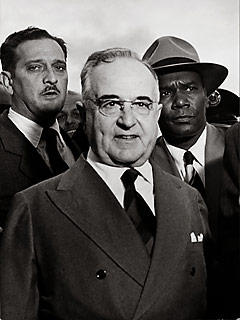
Getúlio Vargas and his personal security, commanded by Gregório Fortunato, on his left (right of the photo).

At the same night, the press began publishing details of the crime. The taxi driver, Nelson Raimundo de Souza, knowing that his vehicle was identified, decided to present himself to a police station. He initially pleaded not guilty and that he was only hired by the passenger, unaware of the crime, but confessed his involvement in a testimony to the police. To the investigators, Raimundo stated he took two persons to Rua Tonelero at the night of the attack against Lacerda. One of them, he didn't know, but he knew very well the other. It was Climério Euribes de Almeida, member of the personal security of the President and acquaintance of Gregório Fortunato.

When the police went to the suspect's house, in the district of Méier, he already had fled. A large force was mobilized for his capture. At dawn, the police published an official statement to the press, with the content of the testimony of driver Nelson Raimundo and affirming that they had determined to carry out several steps in the search of Climério. The operation mobilized around 200 armed men, military vehicles and even helicopters, and extended to four states: Rio de Janeiro, São Paulo, Paraná and Rio Grande do Sul.

Nelson's taxi spot was located on Rua Silveira Martins, in a crossing with Rua do Catete - along to the then presidential palace - and used to be hired by members of Vargas' personal security. One of these members, Almeida, made an agreement with the taxi driver to escape with his vehicle with him and a gunman, Alcino João do Nascimento.

Nascimento, who was a carpenter in financial difficulties, was hired months before by José Antônio Soares to execute an opponent. He quickly accepted the service, but killed the wrong person. This fact didn't stop Soares to appoint him to accomplish a similar task made by Almeida. They had an agreement to kill Lacerda during a rally in Barra Mansa. However, Raimundo's car broke down, delaying the assassination to 4 August, date of the next rally of the journalist. On this day, Almeida and Nascimento went to Colégio São José, but the taxi driver, who was supposed to meet them for the escape, delayed. In the late night, the three decided to go to Lacerda's house.

After cross-fire, Lacerda was shot on the foot, and Major Vaz, after being shot twice by a .45 caliber pistol (of exclusive use of the Brazilian Armed Forces), died heading to the hospital. Alcino stated that the assailant was Lutero Vargas, son of Getúlio Vargas and adversary of Carlos Lacerda. The Air Force high command assumed the investigations on 8 August, same that when Gregório Fortunato, accused to be the main assailant, confessed his participation. Climério Euribes de Almeida and Alcino João do Nascimento were arrested shortly after.

== Aftermath ==
The political crisis that followed the attack, in particular with military personnel unhappy with the death of one of them, escalated by the Lacerda's and his followers violent attacks against the president, without a moderator, increased a wave opposed to Getúlio Vargas. Faced with resignation requests which began to increase, on 23 August, the president met with his ministers in Catete Palace, in order to analyze the political status. It was decided that the president would go on a leave, returning to power when the investigations about the attack were concluded. Two hours later, almost 5:00 a.m. on the 24th, Benjamin Vargas, Vargas' brother, arrived in the Palace with the information that the military wanted him to resign. As a response, after leaving to his bedroom, Vargas affirmed: "Only dead I will leave Catete!" Moments later, a shot was heard: Vargas was dead with a shot in his heart.

Nascimento was sentenced to 33 years in prison, sentence later reduced. He was imprisoned for 23 years and survived two assassination attempts. Fortunato was sentenced to 25 years, later assassinated in prison, just like Almeida, sentenced to 33 years. José Antônio Soares was sentenced to 26 and Nelson Raimundo to 11 years.

== Other interpretations ==
The official story, reviewed by the popular jury that convicted the crime authors in 1956, keeps being contested by people who point to many inconsistencies in the investigation and questions without answers.

One of the main motivators of doubts would be the criminal inquiry, written in an excessive anti-Vargas bias and full of expressions such as "cowardly attack" and "lying testimony", among others. There was no crime reenactment or confrontation between Lacerda (who initially claimed that there were 3 people shooting at him) and the alleged gunman Nascimento.

Another question was the amateurism of the crime authors, who left evident clues which immediately led the investigations to the Catete Palace. Conspiracy theorists claim that this would be intentional, to haste a political crisis which would have as consequence the removal of Vargas from the presidency. There is no testimony or evidence supporting this theory, which is only a hypothesis.

== In literature ==
The events surrounding the Rua Tonelero shooting are a major focal point of the 1990 novel, Crimes of August, by Rubem Fonseca (translated from the Brazilian Agosto to English in 2014).

== See also ==
- Fourth Brazilian Republic
- Politics of Brazil
