= Rubens Florentino Vaz =

Brazilian military officer (1922–1954)

- Born: March 17, 1922; Rio de Janeiro, Brazil
- Died: August 5, 1954 (aged 32); Rio de Janeiro, Brazil
- Spouse: Lygia Figueiredo Vaz
- Military career
- Allegiance: Brazil
- Branch: Air Force
- Service years: 1943–1954
- Rank: Major

Rubens Florentino Vaz (March 17, 1922 – August 5, 1954) was a military officer in the Brazilian Air Force. He was shot and killed by then president Getúlio Vargas's bodyguard Gregório Fortunato in an attempt to assassinate Carlos Lacerda, one of the most prominent opposition voices to the Vargas presidency.

== Life ==
He was born on 17 March 1922 to parents Joaquim Florentino Vaz Júnior and Zilda de Oliveira Vaz. In 1940 he went to Campo dos Afonsos in Rio de Janeiro and completed his course in 1943. In 1954 he served in the Directorate of Air Routes, in Rio de Janeiro, when the opposition to the 2nd government of Getúlio Vargas intensified.

=== Death ===
He was shot during Rua Tonelero shooting which was an assassination attempt on candidate for deputy and journalist Carlos Lacerda, when the latter, returning from a lecture, approached his apartment in the building located at Rua Tonelero. The shots fired wounded Carlos Lacerda's foot and killed Major Rubens Vaz. The subsequent investigation indicated as the mastermind of the crime the head of the personal security of the then President of the Republic, Getúlio Vargas, Gregório Fortunato, nicknamed "The Black Angel". On the day of the crime, August 5, the protection of Carlos Lacerda was supposed to be done by Major Gustavo Borges, but due to the need to make a flight to complete the hours determined for the aviators, Major Vaz replaced him that night, doing his colleague a favor.

Nineteen days after the shooting, on August 24, 1954, Getúlio Vargas committed suicide.

Rubens Vaz was promoted post mortem twice: in 1954 and 1965. He was married to Lígia Figueiredo Vaz, with whom he had four children.
