= Amazon Symphony =

1953 film directed by Anélio Latini Filho

- Theatrical release poster
- Directed by: Anelio Latini Filho
- Written by: Anelio Latini Filho; Joaquim Ribeiro; Wilson Rodrigues
- Produced by: Anelio Latini Filho
- Starring: Almirante; Jaime Barcellos; Sadi Cabral; Estelinha Egg
- Cinematography: Mário Latini
- Edited by: Wanda Latini
- Music by: Altamiro Carrilho; Homero Dornellas; Hélio Latini; Alfredo Passidomo; Scarambone
- Production company: Latini Estúdio
- Distributed by: Unida Filmes
- Release date: 1953
- Running time: 75 minutes
- Country: Brazil
- Language: Portuguese

Sinfonia Amazônica, or Amazon Symphony, is Brazil's first animated feature-length film, produced entirely by Anélio Latini Filho over five years and finished in 1951. Like Disney's Fantasia, it tells several folk stories over orchestral music. The Brazilian television show Animania broadcast several clips of the film. It is currently in the process of restoration.

== Voice cast ==
- Almirante
- Jaime Barcellos
- Sadi Cabral
- Estelinha Egg
- Bartolomeu Fernandes
- Pascoal Longo
- Matinhos
- Estevão Matos
- Nero Morales
- Antônio Nobre
- Paulo Roberto
- Abelardo Santos
- José Vasconcelos
