= Raul Barbosa =

Angolan footballer (born 1972)

Personal information
- Full name: Raul António dos Santos Barbosa
- Date of birth: 18 May 1972 (age 54)
- Position: Defender

International career
Years	Team	Apps	(Gls)
1998	Angola	3	(0)

Raul António dos Santos Barbosa (born 18 May 1972) is an Angolan footballer. He played in three matches for the Angola national football team in 1998. He was also named in Angola's squad for the 1998 African Cup of Nations tournament.
