= Samuel Wainer =

Brazilian journalist

Samuel Wainer (December 19, 1910 – September 2, 1980) was a Brazilian journalist and author. He was born into a Jewish family in Edineț, Bessarabia, then part of the Russian Empire. His family immigrated to Brazil in 1912, settling in São Paulo. He would later found and direct the Diretrizes magazine and the Última Hora newspaper. He was married to Danuza Leão, Brazilian journalist and model, sister of Nara Leão. They had a son, Samuel Wainer Filho, who was also a journalist. He died in 1980 in a car accident with a camera operator. Wainer also had two more children: plastic artist Débora "Pinky" Wainer and film producer Bruno Wainer.

He was a reporter of Diários Associados in 1950, when he interviewed Getúlio Vargas, with whom he would later keep a close friendship. He also faced strong opposition from Carlos Lacerda and Assis Chateaubriand (owner of Diários Associados) during his career, specially when he founded his own newspaper, that would openly support Vargas presidency.

Wainer was the only Brazilian and Latin American journalist present at the Nuremberg Trials.

He died in São Paulo, aged 69.

== Bibliography ==
- Minha razão de viver - memórias de um repórter (Editora Planeta)
- Medeiros, Benicio (2009). A rotativa parou! Os últimos dias da Última Hora de Samuel Wainer. Rio de Janeiro: Civilização Brasileira. ISBN 978-85-200-0940-6.
