= Gregório Fortunato =

Brazilian personal guard (1900–1962)

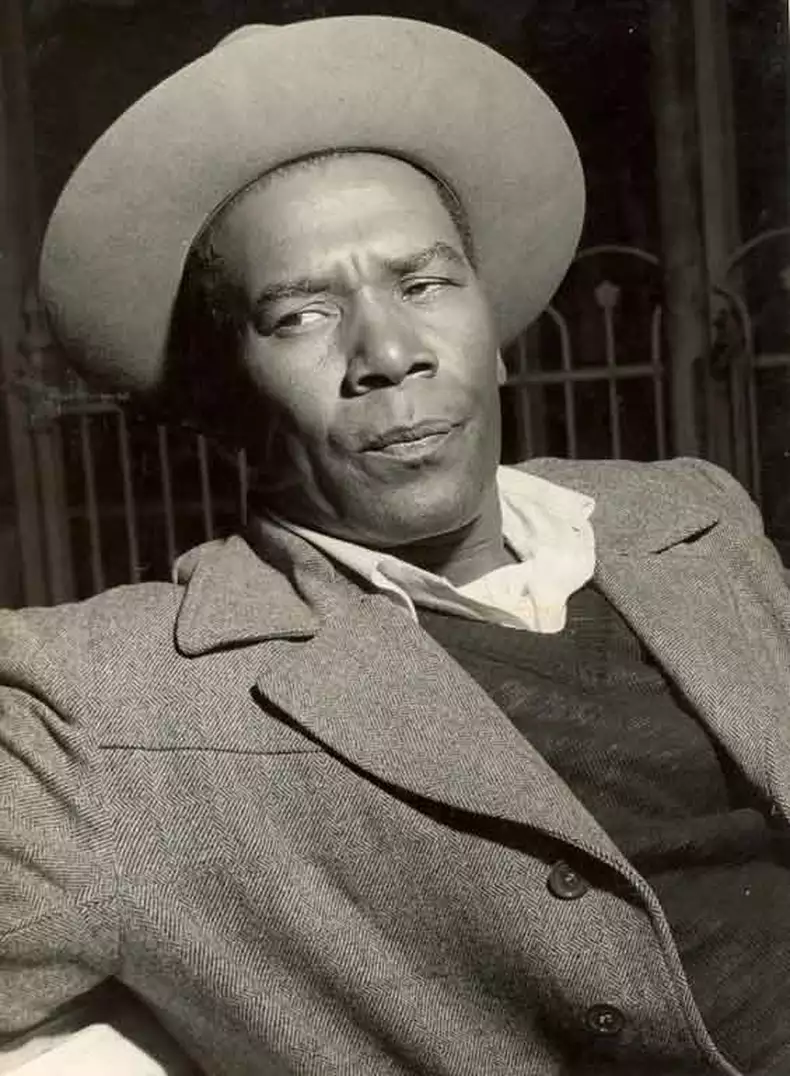
- Born: 24 January 1900; São Borja, Rio Grande do Sul, Brazil
- Died: 23 October 1962 (aged 62); Rio de Janeiro, Guanabara, Brazil
- Cause of death: Assassination

Gregório Fortunato (24 January 1900 – 23 October 1962) was the head of the personal guard of Brazilian president Getúlio Vargas. Fortunato was also known as Anjo Negro (Portuguese for 'Black Angel'), due to his size, physique and his black skin.

== Biography ==
Fortunato was born on 24 January 1900 in the city of São Borja, in Rio Grande do Sul. He was the son of freed slaves Damião Fortunato and Ana de Bairro Fortunato. He was married to Juraci Lencina Fortunato, with whom he had a couple of children.

He worked as a cattle rancher on farms in the region and became close to the Vargas clan after participating in the Constitutionalist Revolution, as a soldier in the 14th Auxiliary Corps of São Borja (today the Military Brigade of Rio Grande do Sul), a unit commanded by colonel Benjamim Vargas, brother of president Getúlio Vargas.

After the failed Integralist uprising against Vargas in 1938, Benjamin created a personal guard to protect the president, recruiting twenty trusted men in his city, including Gregório, who became the head of the guard for his loyalty until the end of the Estado Novo.

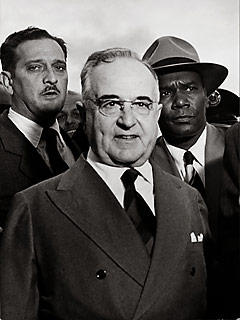
Vargas and his personal guard, headed by Gregório Fortunato (on the right)

On 5 August 1954, the episode known as the "Tonelero Street Attack" took place, which was an assassination attempt on journalist Carlos Lacerda, a staunch opponent of Getúlio Vargas. Gregório Fortunato was accused of being the mastermind of the crime, from which Lacerda was slightly wounded, not having the same luck as the major of the Brazilian Air Force, Rubens Florentino Vaz, who was shot and died on his way to the hospital.

The police searched and seized Gregório's house and found papers that showed that, despite receiving a salary of 15,000 cruzeiros, Gregório owned a set of assets estimated at 65 million cruzeiros. The seized documents also revealed that Gregório bought two properties for 4 million from Getúlio's youngest son, Manuel Sarmanho Vargas, known as Maneco, who was in a difficult financial situation. When the documents became public, Getúlio Vargas initially did not believe in their veracity, then he was deeply shaken.

The attack triggered a political crisis that culminated in the suicide of Getúlio Vargas, with a shot to the heart, on 24 August 1954. In 1956, those accused of the crime at Tonelero Street were brought to a first trial: Gregório Fortunato was sentenced to 25 years as mastermind of the crime; the sentence was later reduced to 20 years by President Juscelino Kubitschek and then to 15 years by President João Goulart.

On 23 October 1962, according to the official report, Gregório Fortunato was murdered at the Frei Caneca Penitentiary, in Rio de Janeiro, after a fight with fellow inmate Feliciano Emiliano Damas, which is speculated by some as a witness elimination, since Gregório had written a personal notebook, the only object of his property that disappeared in prison after his death.

== Bibliography ==
- Henriques, Affonso (1977). Ascensão e Queda de Getúlio Vargas (in Portuguese). Vol. 3. Record.
- Ribeiro, José Augusto (2001). A Era Vargas (in Portuguese). Casa Jorge. ISBN 9788585835286.
