= Última Hora (Brazil) =

Masthead: Ultima Hora

Última Hora was a left-leaning tabloid-style newspaper published in Brazil, established in 1951 by the journalist Samuel Wainer. Initially the paper was published in Rio de Janeiro, later also in São Paulo. It was followed by a national edition, based in São Paulo with local supplements in Niterói, Porto Alegre, Belo Horizonte, Recife, Curitiba, Campinas, Santos, Bauru and the ABC Region surrounding São Paulo.

In 1971 the paper was taken over by the Folha Group, owners of the Folha de S. Paulo and other publications. In addition to its Rio de Janeiro headquarters, it had editions in São Paulo and a national edition, with supplementary local sections in Porto Alegre , Belo Horizonte, Recife, Niterói, Curitiba, Campinas, Santos, Bauru, and the ABC Paulista region .

== Links ==
- Ultima Hora in the digital archives of the Arquivo Público do Estado de São Paulo.
- Tulchin, Joseph S.; Espach, Ralph H. (17 August 2000). Combating Corruption in Latin America. Woodrow Wilson Center Press. p. 178. ISBN 978-1-930365-01-8.
