= Carlos Lacerda =

Brazilian politician

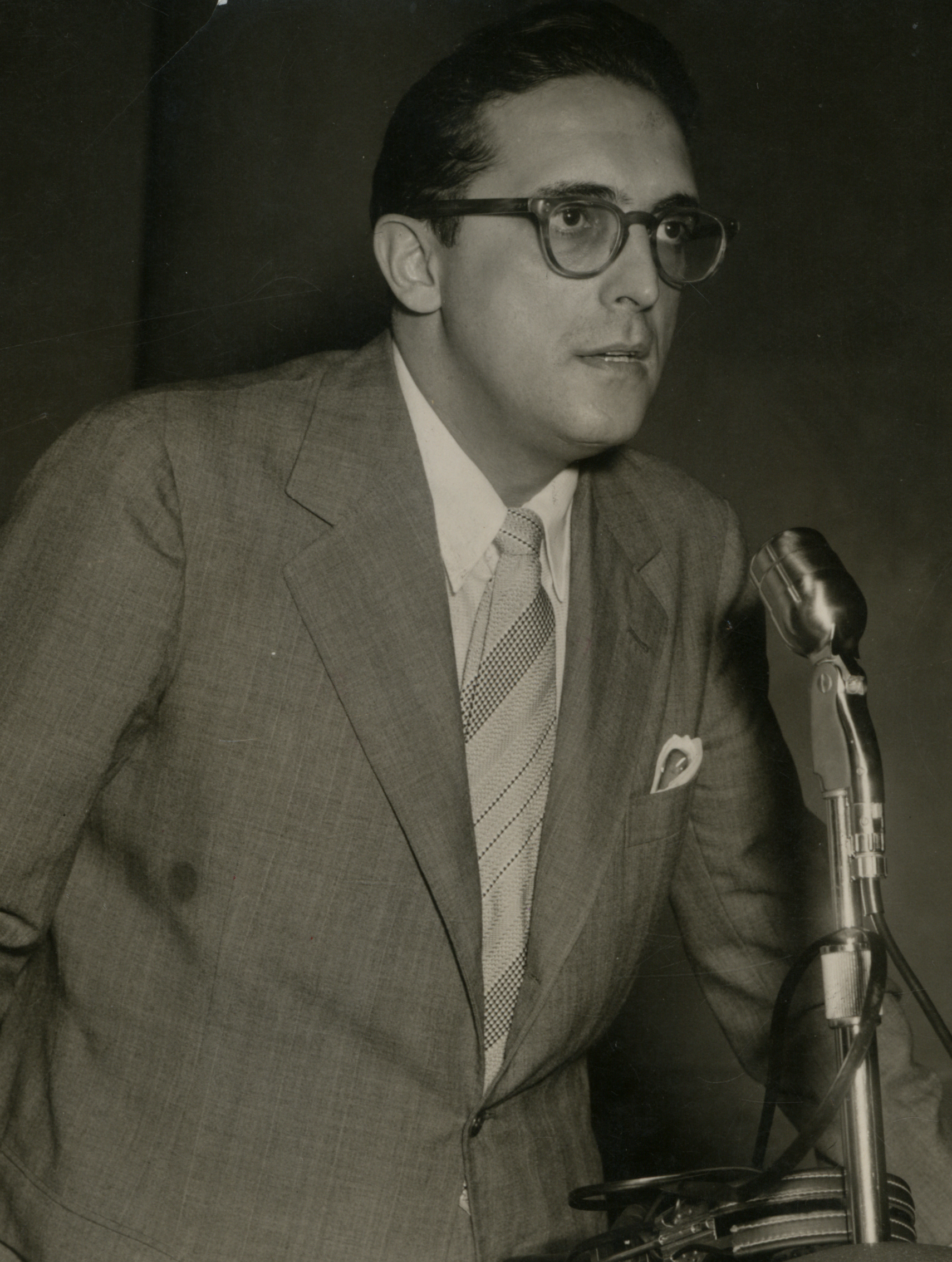

Governor of Guanabara
- In office 5 December 1960 – 11 October 1965
- Lieutenant: Vacant (1960–1963); Elói Dutra (1963–1964); Rafael Magalhães (1964–1965)
- Preceded by: José Sette Câmara
- Succeeded by: Negrão de Lima

Member of the Chamber of Deputies
- In office 21 April 1960 – 1 December 1960
- Constituency: Guanabara
- In office 2 February 1955 – 21 April 1960
- Constituency: Federal District

Councillor of the Federal District
- In office 14 March 1947 – 16 January 1948
- Constituency: At-large

Personal details
- Born: Carlos Frederico Werneck de Lacerda; 30 April 1914 Rio de Janeiro, Federal District, Brazil
- Died: 21 May 1977 (aged 63) Rio de Janeiro, Rio de Janeiro, Brazil
- Party: UDN (1945–1965)
- Spouse: Letícia Abruzzini (m. 1935)
- Children: 3
- Education: National College of Law (LL.B.)
- Profession: Journalist, politician
- Awards

Carlos Frederico Werneck de Lacerda (30 April 1914 – 21 May 1977) was a Brazilian journalist and politician.

== Biography ==
Born in Rio de Janeiro, Lacerda was the son of a family of politicians from Vassouras, Rio de Janeiro state. He was the son of the politician, tribune and writer Maurício de Lacerda (1888–1959) and Olga Caminhoá Werneck (1892–1979), being the paternal grandson of Sebastião Lacerda, Minister of the Supreme Federal Court and Minister of Transport in the government of Prudente de Morais. For his maternal family, he was great-grandson of botanist Joaquim Monteiro Caminhoá, great-grandson of the baron of Ribeirão, a direct descendant of Inácio de Sousa Vernek, whose family had important political and economic influence in the region; great-nephew of the baron of Maçambara, of the viscount of Cananeia, of the baron of Avelar e Almeida, of the baroness of Werneck, great-nephew of the baron of Santa Fé and great-nephew of the 1st baron of Santa Justa.

Lacerda was named after Karl Marx (Carlos) and Friedrich Engels (Frederico). When he was a law student, Lacerda became sympathetic to left-wing ideas, but by the 1940s, he had transformed into a staunch anticommunist and conservative.

He started his journalism career at Diário de Notícias (English: Daily News) in 1939. In 1949 he founded the newspaper Tribuna da Imprensa (English: Press Tribune).

Starting his political career in 1947, Lacerda was elected to the legislative chamber (city council) of the city of Rio de Janeiro. In 1950, he was elected a National Democratic Union representative for the state of Rio in the Chamber of Deputies. He became well known for his uncompromising opposition of the government of President Getúlio Vargas and even demanded the overthrow of Vargas.

He survived an assassination attempt in the Rua Tonelero shooting in August 1954. It is widely believed by historians to have been made by men acting under the orders of Gregório Fortunato, O Anjo Negro (Portuguese for "The Black Angel"), a black man, who was the head of Vargas' personal bodyguards. Brazilian Air Force Major Rubens Florentino Vaz was killed in the attempt, while Lacerda and a municipal guard named Sálvio Romeiro was slightly injured. That sparked a political crisis that culminated with the suicide of Vargas 19 days later.

Lacerda was re-elected to the Chamber of Deputies later in 1954, with more votes than any other candidate. He also opposed the government of President Juscelino Kubitschek.

Lacerda was elected governor of Guanabara State, comprising Rio, in 1960. His administration was praised by the US government and the IMF for his efforts to solve some chronic problems of Rio such as water services, public transportation and housing. As part of this drive, Lacerda ordered areas of the city - often areas targeted by developers - to be cleared of the inhabitants. Over this period, up to 140,000 people were evicted, mostly from the three favelas on the Rodrigo de Freitas lagoon, located near the beaches of the city's south zone.

An opinionated and controversial politician, Lacerda was involved in the crisis of the resignation of President Jânio Quadros in 1961 and conspired against the presidency of João Goulart. Hoping to be elected president in the 1965 elections, Lacerda initially supported the 1964 military coup d'état and was nominated the UDN candidate. Since the military was not willing to give up power, the 1965 elections were cancelled, and Lacerda definitely fell from the military's favor. In 1968, his efforts to restore democracy in Brazil allied him to his old enemies, Kubitschek and Goulart, and Lacerda was arrested for a brief period and stripped of his right to run for political office for ten years. Then, he retired from politics and resumed his journalism and publishing career. In 1977, he died suddenly in Rio de Janeiro from a heart attack. His wife, Leticia, died in 1990.

He has been referred to as the Brazilian counterpart of Barry Goldwater.

== Popular culture ==
Lacerda was portrayed by Alexandre Borges in the 2014 biographical drama film Getúlio.

Author Rubem Fonseca treats the assassination attempt on Lacerda (Rua Tonelero shooting) as part of his role in the crises events of Rio de Janeiro during August 1954 in his 1990 novel, Crimes of August, (translated from the Brazilian Agosto to English in 2014).

His friendship with the architect Lota de Macedo Soares is depicted as a side plot in the 2013 film Flores Raras (Reaching for the Moon), directed by Bruno Barreto and starring Gloria Pires and Miranda Otto. Actor Marcello Airoldi played Lacerda in this biographical drama about the 15 years relationship of American poet Elizabeth Bishop and Lota de Macedo Soares.

== Biographical reference ==
- Dulles, John W. F. Carlos Lacerda: Brazilian Crusader. Austin: University of Texas, 1996. ISBN 9780292715813

Political offices
Preceded by José Sette Câmara	Governor of Guanabara; 1960–1965	Succeeded by Negrão de Lima
