= J. B. Tanko =

Yugoslav-Brazilian film director

- Born: Josip Bogoslaw Tanko; April 21, 1906; Sisak, Kingdom of Croatia-Slavonia (present-day Croatia)
- Died: October 5, 1993 (aged 87); Rio de Janeiro, Rio de Janeiro, Brazil
- Occupations: Film director, film producer, screenwriter
- Years active: 1937–1987
- Children: 1

Josip Bogoslaw Tanko (April 21, 1906 – October 5, 1993) was a Croat filmmaker who directed O Trapalhão nas Minas do Rei Salomão, one of the biggest cinematic hits in Brazil of all time. He also founded JBTV - J. B. Tanko Filmes Ltda.

== Biography ==
Josip Bogoslaw Tanko was born on April 21, 1906, in the Croatian city of Sisak. He was passionate about cinema from childhood.

In the 1930s, he started working at Sascha-Filmindustrie AG and Wlen-Film GmbH in Vienna, Austria creating Yugoslavian versions of German and Austrian films. He also worked at Tobis Filmkunst, Terra Filmkunst, and UFA in Berlin as an assistant director, participating as part of a team in the 1937 Wien-Film, created by Goebbels.

At the beginning of World War II, Tanko took over the Army Documentary Film Department in Belgrade.

Tanko filmed the bombing of Belgrade when Yugoslavia was invaded by Germany, fleeing to Berlin with the film.

In 1942, Tanko returned to Vienna.; however, having lost his entire family during the war, he decided to emigrate to Brazil.

In 1948, Tanko took up residence in the city of Rio de Janeiro, contributing to the professionalization of Brazilian cinema with his diverse experience. His first work was in Cinelândia Filmes, as assistant director and screenwriter of A Escrava Isaura, an adaptation of Bernardo Guimarães' novel.

Without leaving Cinelandia, he also began to work in the Cinematographic Atlântida, where he played several roles, ultimately becoming a director. Having made some dramas that were not successful with the audience, he turned to comedies (chanchadas).

In the 1950s, J. B. Tanko worked with Watson Macedo and Roberto Farias.

In 1955, he began working for Herbert Richers. He directed 18 films for Richers, including a series of comedies starring Ankito, Grande Otelo, Zé Trindade and Ronald Golias. Tanko also continued working on dramas, police films, and movies for children.

In 1967, he directed Adoravel Trapalhão, where he met his longtime partner, Renato Aragão. He continued his work, directing eleven episodes for the TV series Os Trapalhões.

In 1969, he founded JBTV - J. B. Tanko Filmes Ltda and directed several comedies for teenagers. Working with the team from Os Trapalhões, he directed the film,O Trapalhão nas Minas do Rei Salomão, one of the biggest box office hits in Brazilian cinema of all time (about 6 million spectators).

Tanko has also produced films of other genres, such as the erotic drama As Borboletas Também Amam, with the actress Angelina Muniz, and the musical Vamos Cantar Disco, Baby?, with the ensemble "As Melindrosas."

In 1983, he produced the film Perdoa-Me Por Me Traíres, which was directed by the Braz Chediak and was based on the work of Nélson Rodrigues.

When Dedé Santana, Zacarias and Mussum separated from Renato Aragão, creating the DeMuZa Produções, J. B. Tanko produced the comedy Atrapalhando a Suate.

At the age of 81, he directed his last film, Os Fantasmas Trapalhões, before dying of a heart attack 6 years later, at 87. His son, Alexander Tanko, continued his father's craft until his death on July 12, 2006 at the age of 53.

== Filmography ==
- 1946 - Amerika Hilft Oesterreich
- 1948 - A Escrava Isaura (assistant director)
- 1951 - Areias ardentes
- 1954 - A outra face do homem
- 1956 - Com Água na Boca
- 1956 - Sai de Baixo
- 1956 - Fuzileiro do Amor (production manager)
- 1957 - Com Jeito Vai
- 1957 - Metido a Bacana
- 1958 - E o Bicho Não Deu
- 1959 - Entrei de gaiato
- 1959 - Garota Enxuta
- 1959 - Mulheres à Vista
- 1960 - Marido de Mulher Boa
- 1960 - Vai que É Mole
- 1961 - O Dono da Bola
- 1961 - Bom mesmo é Carnaval
- 1964 - Asfalto Selvagem
- 1964 - Um Ramo para Luísa
- 1966 - Engraçadinha depois dos 30
- 1967 - Adorável Trapalhão with Renato Aragão and Os Trapalhões
- 1967 - Carnaval Barra
- 1968 - Massacre no Supermercado
- 1969 - Pais quadrados, filhos avançados
- 1970 - Como Ganhar na Loteria sem Perder a Esportiva
- 1971 - Rua descalça
- 1971 - Som, amor e curtição
- 1972 - Salve-se Quem Puder - Rally da Juventude
- 1973 - Aladim e a lâmpada maravilhosa
- 1974 - Robin Hood, o trapalhão da floresta with Renato Aragão and Os Trapalhões
- 1975 - O Trapalhão na Ilha do Tesouro with Renato Aragão and Os Trapalhões
- 1976 - O Trapalhão no Planalto dos Macacos with Renato Aragão and Os Trapalhões
- 1976 - Simbad, o marujo trapalhão with Renato Aragão and Os Trapalhões
- 1977 - O Trapalhão nas minas do Rei Salomão with Renato Aragão and Os Trapalhões
- 1978 - As Borboletas também Amam
- 1979 - Vamos Cantar Disco, Baby?
- 1980 - Atrapalhando a Suate with Renato Aragão and Os Trapalhões
- 1981 - Os Saltimbancos Trapalhões with Renato Aragão and Os Trapalhões
- 1982 - Os Trapalhões na Serra Pelada with Renato Aragão and Os Trapalhões
- 1982 - Os Vagabundos Trapalhões with Renato Aragão and Os Trapalhões
- 1983 - Perdoa-me por Me Traíres (producer)
- 1987 - Os Fantasmas Trapalhões with Renato Aragão and Os Trapalhões

== Awards ==
- Areias Ardentes (feature film) - Saci Award, 1952, SP, for Best Screenplay for J. B. Tanko.
- Sai de Baixo (feature film) - Special Award for Tanko, J. B. in the Special Governor Award of the State of São Paulo, 1956, São Paulo - SP.
