= Os Originais do Samba =

Brazilian samba musical group

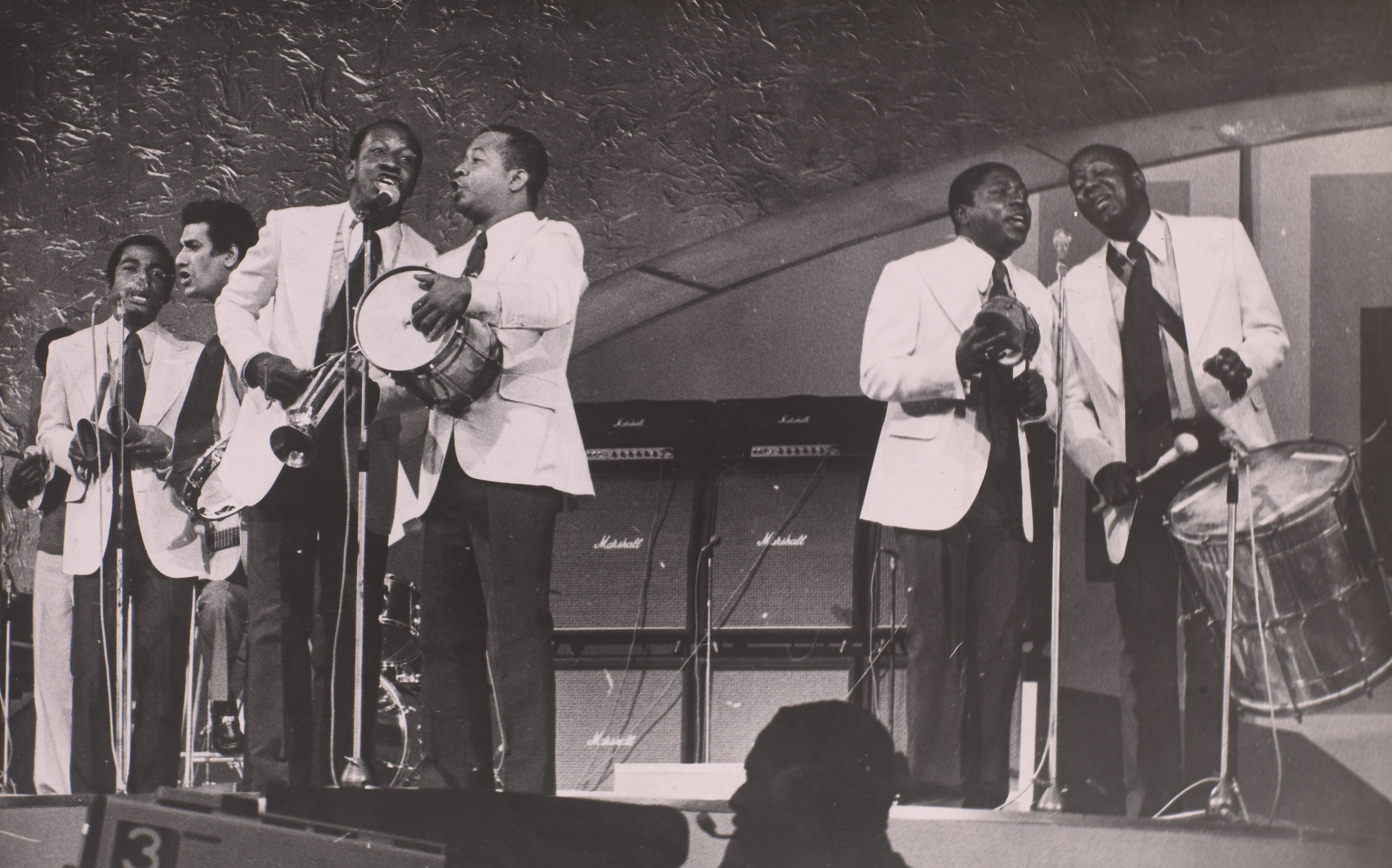
- Os Originais do Samba, 1972. Brazilian National Archives

Background information
- Origin: Rio de Janeiro, Brazil
- Genres: Samba; Samba rock
- Years active: 1960–present
- Label: Sony Music Brazil
- Members: Bigode do Pandeiro; Juninho; Rogério Santos; Marcos Scooby
- Past members: Gibi; Bidi; Bigode; Chiquinho; Coimbra/Zinho/Claudio; Lelei; Mussum; Rubão; Rubinho Lima; Sócrates; Valtinho Tato; Zeca do Cavaquinho

Os Originais do Samba (meaning "The Originals of Samba") is a Brazilian samba musical group that began in the 1960s in Rio de Janeiro by percussionists from the various samba schools of Rio. Their most famous member was Mussum, who was later a member of the comedy group Os Trapalhões with Renato Aragão, Mauro Gonçalves and Dedé Santana. The other members included Coimbra (reco-reco), Zinho (cuíca) and Claudio (surdo).

They played with many famous names in the MPB scene such as Alex Luiz, Armando Geraldo, Jair Rodrigues, and Vinicius de Moraes, as well as famed musicians from other countries such as Earl Grant. They have also played abroad in Europe and the United States. They were the first samba group to play at the Olympia in Paris.

Some of their major hits include "Tá Chegando Fevereiro" (Jorge Ben/João Melo), "Do Lado Direito da Rua Direita" (Luiz Carlos/Chiquinho), "A Dona do Primeiro Andar", "O Aniversário do Tarzan", "Esperanças Perdidas" (Adeilton Alves/Délcio Carvalho), "Vou me Pirulitar", "E Lá se Vão Meus Anéis" (Eduardo Gudin/P.C. Pinheiro), "Tragédia no Fundo do Mar (Assassinato do Camarão)" (Zeré/Ibrahim), "Se Papai Gira" (Jorge Ben), and "Nego Véio Quando Morre".

== History ==
The group was created as "Os Sete Modernos do Samba" in 1960. Since 1961, they have gone as "Os Originais do Samba", and performed at beaches and parties, including one at Copacabana Palace.

They were based in Recife after making an excursion in the United States, and in 1968 they accompanied Elis Regina in a winning song at the first Bienal do Samba, called Lapinha, written by Baden Powell and P.C. Pinheiro.

With the resulting good publicity, the group, originally made up of Bidi, Bigode Chiquinho, Lelei, Rubão and Mussum, signed with RCA and recorded their first album, Os Originais do Samba, in 1969. The album was a huge success, boosted by the single "Cadê Tereza?", written by Jorge Ben. As further evidence of their success, in the first half of the 1970s, they had massive successes with "Do lado direito da rua direita" (Luiz Carlos e Chiquinho, 1972), "Esperanças perdidas" (Adeilton Alves e Délcio Carvalho, 1972) and "Tragédia no fundo do mar (Assassinato do camarão)" (Ibrain e Zeré, 1974). They participated at festivals and were certified gold discs for the sales of their recordings, combining their unison singing style, matching clothes and humorous lyrics.

In 1979, Mussum left the group to dedicate himself to his comedy career. In 1980, they recorded a disc ("Mulher, Mulher", with Jorge Ben), a LP in 1981 titled Eu me Rendo (Fábio Jr.), and another LP in 1983 titled Canta Meu Povo, Canta.

In 2000, they recorded the CD Ao Vivo with invited guests such as Almir Guineto, Carlos Dafé, Joãozinho Carnavalesco, and Dhema, among others. Another hit came with the remix of "A Subida do Morro", featuring the rapper Xis. In 2003, they recorded a samba-rock album Swing dos Originais, rerecording their biggest hits. In 2008, they independently released the album A Corda Arrebenta e o Samba não Cai, with 15 previously unreleased songs and two rerecordings.

Since 2017, they had a change in the design of their group, while also keeping with the traditional elements of their group. In June 2017, they released the project Ontem, Hoje e Sempre, where they shedded their older aesthetics, while also keeping with their musical style of traditional samba with new songs, as well as special guests such as Zeca Pagodinho, Benito Di Paula, and Reinaldo.

== Members ==
=== Current line-up ===
- Bigode do Pandeiro
- Juninho
- Rogério Santos
- Marcos Scooby

=== Previous line-ups ===
==== Original line-up ====
- Mussum - reco-reco, voice
- Bidi - cuíca, voice
- Chiquinho - ganzá, voice
- Lelei - tamborim, voice
- Rubão - surdo, voice
- Bigode - pandeiro, voice
- Branca de Neve - guitar, voice

==== Second line-up ====
- Coimbra - reco reco, voice
- Zinho - cuica, voice
- Chiquinho - agogô, voice
- Lelei - tamborim, voice
- Claudio - surdo, voice
- Bigode - pandeiro, voice

==== Third line-up ====
- Bigode - pandeiro, voice
- Zeca do Cavaco - cavaco, banjo
- Gibi - reco-reco, tamborim
- Sócrates - guitar
- Rubinho Lima - percussion
- Valtinho Tato - percussion

=== Ex-members ===
- Mussum
- Chiquinho
- Lelei
- Rubão
- Bigode
- Almir Guineto
- Armando
- Branca di Neve
- Idi Amin
- Coimbra - reco-reco, voice (replacing Mussum in 1980)
- Zinho da Cuíca (replacing Bidi)
- Claudio - surdo (replacing Branca di Neve)
- Gibi
- Vinicius - baterista
- Biguinho - composer
- Paulo Rogério, o Paulão - baterista
- Rubinho Lima - after Sambasonic
- Sócrates
- Valtinho Tato
- Zeca do Cavaquinho
- Joãozinho Carnavalesco
- Fritz Escovão
- Betinho Drumms - vocals and composer
- Zé Carlos (Adorno) - keyboard player and arranger
- Gêra
- Ulysses Costa - bateria (currently Banda Tradição Popular)
- Bidi

== Discography ==
=== Albums ===
- Os Originais do Samba (1995) RGE
- Os Originais de todos os sambas (1997) RGE
- Os Originais do Samba Ao Vivo (2000) Rhythm and Blues
- Swing dos Originais (2003) Rhythm and Blues/Canta Brasil
- A Corda Arrebenta e o Samba não cai (2008) Independent
- Os Originais do Samba (1969, RCA)
- Os Originais do Samba - Volume 2 (1970, RCA)
- Samba é de Lei (1970, RCA)
- Samba Exportação (1971, RCA)
- O Samba é a Corda... Os Originais a Caçamba (1972, RCA)
- É Preciso Cantar (1973, RCA)
- Pra que Tristeza (1974, RCA)
- Alegria de Sambar (1975, RCA)
- Em Verso e Prosa (1976, RCA)
- Os Bons Sambistas Vão Voltar (1977, RCA)
- Aniversario do Tarzan (1978, RCA)
- Clima Total (1979, RCA)
- Os Originais do Samba (1981, RCA)
- Canta, Meu povo, Canta (1983, RCA)
- A Malandragem Entrou em Greve (1986) Copacabana
- Sangue, Suor e Samba (1989) Copacabana
- Brincar de Ser Feliz (1992) ChicShow/Fivestar
- A Vida é Assim (1994) ChicShow/Fivestar

=== Others ===
- Show / Recital - Baden Powell - Márcia - Os Originais do Samba (1968)

== See also ==
- Samba
- Os Trapalhões
- Mussum
