= O Mistério de Robin Hood =

1990 film directed by José Alvarenga Júnior

Xuxa e os Trapalhões em O Mistério de Robin Hood
- Theatrical release poster
- Directed by: José Alvarenga Jr.
- Written by: Paulo Andrade; Renato Aragão; Mauro Wilson
- Produced by: Marco Altberg; Denise Aragão; Diler Trindade
- Starring: Renato Aragão; Dedé Santana; Antônio Carlos Gomes; Xuxa Meneghel
- Cinematography: Walter Carvalho
- Music by: Jota Morais
- Production companies: Renato Aragão Produçoes Artisticas; Xuxa Produçoes; Demuza; Art Films; Columbia Tri-Star Filmes do Brasil
- Distributed by: Art Films; Columbia Tri-Star Filmes do Brasil
- Release date: December 14, 1990
- Running time: 90 minutes
- Country: Brazil
- Language: Portuguese

Xuxa e os Trapalhões em O Mistério de Robin Hood (English: Xuxa and the Bumbling in The Mystery of Robin Hood) is a 1990 Brazilian comedy-adventure film, directed by José Alvarenga Júnior. The film is starring Xuxa Meneghel and Os Trapalhões.

== Plot ==
The tramp Didi is a modern Robin Hood who steals from the smugglers and moneylenders to give to the needy. He lives in hiding near a circus, and is in love with Tatiana, the daughter of an old magician. In this circus, Tonho and Fredo are very clumsy employees.

== Cast ==
- Renato Aragão as Didi
- Dedé Santana as Fredo
- Antônio Carlos "Mussum" Gomes as Tonho
- Xuxa Meneghel as Tatiana
- Carlos Eduardo Dolabella as Gavião
- Márcio Seixas as Gavião's voice
- Duda Little as Rosa / Luisa Cavalcante Rocha
- Roberto Guilherme as circus guard
- Átila Iório as circus owner
- Nildo Parente as Rosa's father
- Juan Daniel as Sebastian, the dad of Tatiana
- Tião Macalé as himself
- Beto Carrero as himself
- Amadeu Celestino

== Critical reception ==
Conrado Heoli in his criticism for the website Papo de Cinema, said that the film "demonstrates the fatigue of the group [The Trapalhões] and the difficulty in remaining relevant and inventive, after more than three decades dedicated to humor. artistic in costumes, scenarios and even in its plot, the film ends up as an extended episode of the television humorous series, recycling gags that have already been seen, without much inspiration ... [It has] as many mistakes as the correct ones."

== See also ==
- List of films and television series featuring Robin Hood
- List of Brazilian films of the 1990s
