= List of Brazilian films of 1960 =

A list of films produced in Brazil in 1960:

Title	Director	Cast	Genre
A Viúva Valentina	Euripides Ramos	Dercy Gonçalves, Jaime Costa, Humberto Catalano	Comedy
Aí Vem a Alegria	José Cajado Filho	Carequinha, Fred Villar, Sonia Mamede	Comedy
As Aventuras de Pedro Malazartes	Amácio Mazzaropi	Amácio Mazzaropi, Geny Prado, Genésio Arruda	Comedy
Bahia de Todos os Santos	José Hipolito Trigueirinho Neto	Lola Brah, Sadi Cabral, Francisco Contreras	Drama
Briga, Mulher e Samba	Sanin Cherques	Ronaldo Lupo, Renata Fronzi, Luely Figueiró	Comedy
Bruma Seca	Mário Civelli	Adoniran Barbosa, Mário Brasini, Eneida Costa	
Cacareco Vem Aí	Carlos Manga	Oscarito, Cyl Farney, Odete Lara	Comedy
Cala a Boca, Etelvina	Euripides Ramos, Hélio Barroso	Dercy Gonçalves, Humberto Catalano, Manoel Vieira	Comedy
Com Minha Sogra em Paquetá	Saul Lachtermacher	Dercy Gonçalves, Rodolfo del Rio, Iara Farbiaz	Comedy
Cidade Ameaçada	Roberto Farias	Jardel Filho, Eva Wilma, Reginaldo Faria	Crime
Conceição	Hélio Souto	Marco Antônio, Walter Avancini, Norma Bengell	Crime thriller
Dona Violante Miranda	Fernando De Barros	Dercy Gonçalves, Odete Lara, Marina Freire	Comedy drama
E Eles Não Voltaram	Wilson Silva	Carlos Alberto, Jair Dantas, Paulo Goulart	War
Éramos Irmãos	Renato Ferreira	Cícero Cardoso, Nilza de Lima, Carmem Ferreira	Drama
Favela	Armando Bo	Carlos Amaury, Ruth de Souza, Moacyr Deriquém	Drama
Girl in Room 13	Richard E. Cunha	Brian Donlevy, Andrea Bayard, Victor Merinow	Crime drama
Férias no Arraial	Edward Freund	Jamil Abrahão, Júlia Abrahão, Mário Barra	
Homens do Brasil	Nelson Marcellino de Carvalho	Damásio Cardoso, Nair Cardoso, Nelson Marcellino de Carvalho	Drama
Jeca Tatu	Milton Amaral	Amácio Mazzaropi, Geny Prado, Roberto Duval	Musical comedy
Ladrão em Noite de Chuva	Armando Couto	Armando Couto, Ludy Veloso, Renato Consorte	Comedy
O Cupim	Carlos Manga	Oscarito, Sonia Mamede, Margot Louro	Comedy
Os dois Ladrões	Carlos Manga	Oscarito, Cyl Farney, Eva Todor	Comedy
Macumba Love	Douglas Fowley	Walter Reed, Ziva Rodann, William Wellman Jr.	Action adventure
Marido de Mulher Boa	J. B. Tanko	Zé Trindade, Renata Fronzi, Otelo Zeloni	Comedy
Minervina Vem Aí	Euripides Ramos, Hélio Barroso	Dercy Gonçalves, Magalhães Graça, Zezé Macedo	Comedy
Na Garganta do Diabo	Walter Hugo Khouri	Luigi Picchi, Odete Lara, Fernando Baleroni	Drama
O Cantor e a Bailarina	Armando de Miranda	Nancy Rinaldi, Domingos Marques, Otelo Zeloni	Romantic comedy
O Palhaço O Que É?	Carlos Manga	Carequinha, Fred Villar, Sonia Mamede	Comedy
O Viúvo Alegre	Victor Lima	Zé Trindade, Jaime Costa, Costinha	Musical comedy
Pequeno por Fora	Aloisio T. de Carvalho	Chico Anysio, Lara Baldo, Sílvio Bittencourt	Comedy
Pintando o Sete	Carlos Manga	Oscarito, Cyl Farney, Sonia Mamede	Comedy
Quanto Mais Samba Melhor	Carlos Manga	Cyl Farney, Maria Petar, Vagareza	Comedy
Sai Dessa, Recruta	Hélio Barroso	Ankito, Consuelo Leandro, Renato Restier	Comedy
Só Naquela Base	Ronaldo Lupo	Wellington Botelho, Cilo Costa, Liana Duval	Comedy
Tudo Legal	Victor Lima	Ronald Golias, Jaime Costa, Marina Marcel	Comedy
Vai Que É Mole	J. B. Tanko	Ankito, Grande Otelo, Renata Fronzi	Comedy
Virou Bagunça	Watson Macedo	Paulo Gilvan Bezerril, Edson França, João Costa Neto	Musical comedy
Zé do Periquito	Amácio Mazzaropi, Ismar Porto	Amácio Mazzaropi, Geny Prado, Roberto Duval	Comedy

== See also ==
- 1960 in Brazil
