= O Trapalhão na Arca de Noé =

1983 film directed by Del Rangel

- Directed by: Del Rangel
- Written by: Renato Aragão; Doc Comparato; Del Rangel; Aguinaldo Silva
- Produced by: Renato Aragão
- Starring: Renato Aragão; Manfredo Colassanti; Gracindo Júnior; Sérgio Mallandro
- Cinematography: Carlos Egberto Silveira
- Music by: Remo Usai
- Distributed by: Embrafilme; Reserva Especial; Som Livre (DVD)
- Release date: December 15, 1983
- Running time: 91 minutes
- Country: Brazil
- Language: Portuguese

O Trapalhão na Arca de Noé (English: The Bumbling in Noah's Ark) is a 1983 Brazilian adventure parody film, directed by Del Rangel and starring Renato Aragão. This film is loosely based in the story of Noah's Ark and Steven Spielberg's Raiders of the Lost Ark, with humorous effects.

== Plot ==
The zoo janitor Duda and Kiko and Zeca friends form a group of animal protection. Therefore, they are called by the mystical Noah for a rescue mission of the Pantanal fauna and flora. The area is threatened with extinction due to exploitation of Morel skin smugglers and his foreman Juarez. They accept the mission and on the way are the archaeologist Marcos and Carla photographer in search of a pyramid left in place by the Phoenician civilization. Together, the bad guys win and in the end, Duda is invited by Noah to join a group of special people who will populate a new world.

== Production ==
Renato Aragão said that O Trapalhão na Arca de Noé was inspired by Steven Spielberg's Raiders of the Lost Ark. It was done during the separation of the Trapalhões, which lasted only six months. Dedé Santana, Mussum and Zacarias made the film Atrapalhando a Suate, and there was competition between the two films in theaters. The song chosen for the opening of the film is called "Mars: Bringer of War" by The Planets composed by Gustav Holst.

== Cast ==
- Renato Aragão .... Duda
- Sérgio Mallandro .... Kiko
- Fábio Villa Verde .... Zeca
- Nádia Lippi .... Carla
- Manfredo Colassanti .... Noé
- Gracindo Júnior .... Marcos
- Milton Moraes .... Morel
- Dary Reis .... Juarez
- Carlos Kurt
- Xuxa Meneghel .... Lira, the Duda's intergalactic partner

== See also ==
- List of Brazilian films of the 1980s
