= Ondino =

Ondino is a male given name. Notable people with the name include:

- Ondino Sant'Anna (1940–2010), Brazilian actor, brother of Dedé
- Ondino Viera (1901–1997), Uruguayan football manager
