= Tião Macalé (comedian) =

Brazilian comedian

- Born: Moisés Bruno dos Santos Gregório; February 10, 1926; Rio de Janeiro, Brazil
- Died: October 26, 1993 (aged 67); São José do Rio Preto, Brazil
- Occupation: Actor

Moisés Bruno dos Santos Gregório (February 10, 1926 – October 26, 1993) known artistically as Tião Macalé, was a Brazilian comedian.

He was born in Rio de Janeiro. He is known in Brazil for his role of supporting character in the Brazilian comedic series Os Trapalhões in the 1980s and early 1990s, and famous for his catchphrase Nojento! (Disgusting!) in the series and TV commercials. He suffered from lung diseases and died in São José do Rio Preto in 1993.

== Filmography ==
=== With Os Trapalhões ===
- 1990 - O Mistério de Robin Hood
- 1983 - Atrapalhando a Suate (this film was produced without the presence Didi [Renato Aragão], because Dedé, Mussum and Zacarias had left temporally the series and the group Os Trapalhões [which Aragão owned] at the time the movie was made)

=== Solo ===
- 1990 - O Escorpião Escarlate
- 1986 - As Sete Vampiras
- 1983 - A Longa Noite do Prazer
- 1978 - As 1001 Posições do Amor
- 1975 - Com as Calças na Mão
- 1975 - Com Um Grilo na Cama
- 1975 - Costinha o Rei da Selva
- 1975 - O Estranho Vicio do Dr. Cornélio
- 1975 - O Padre Que Queria Pecar
- 1974 - O Comprador de Fazendas
- 1973 - Salve-se Quem Puder
- 1973 - Café na Cama
- 1971 - Os Caras de Pau
- 1969 - O Impossível Acontece
