= List of Brazilian films of the 1980s =

An incomplete list of films produced in Brazil in the 1980s. For an A-Z list of films currently on Wikipedia see Category:Brazilian films.

== 1980 ==
- List of Brazilian films of 1980

== 1981 ==
- List of Brazilian films of 1981

== 1982 ==
- List of Brazilian films of 1982

== 1983 ==
- List of Brazilian films of 1983

== 1984 ==
- List of Brazilian films of 1984

== 1985 ==
- List of Brazilian films of 1985

== 1986-1989 ==
Title	Director	Cast	Genre	Notes
1986
Antes do Galo Cantar				
Jubiabá	Nelson Pereira dos Santos	Charles Baiano, Françoise Goussard, Grande Otelo	Romantic drama	
Love Me Forever or Never	Arnaldo Jabor	Fernanda Torres, Thales Pan Chacon	Drama	Won Best Actress at the 1986 Cannes Film Festival
Os Trapalhões e o Rei do Futebol	Carlos Manga	Renato Aragão, Pelé	Comedy	
1987
Anjos da Noite				
Automaquiagem 1				
Anjos do Arrabalde				
Andy Warhol Está Morto				
Aos Ventos do Futuro				
As Apatralhadas do Fofão				
Aurura				
Subway to the Stars	Carlos Diegues	Guilherme Fontes, Milton Gonçalves, Taumaturgo Ferreira, Ana Beatriz Wiltgen, Zé Trindade	Drama	Entered into the 1987 Cannes Film Festival
Vera	Sérgio Toledo	Ana Beatriz Nogueira	Drama	Nogueira won the Silver Bear for Best Actress at Berlin.
The Man in the Black Cape	Sérgio Rezende	José Wilker, Marieta Severo	Drama	Entered into the 15th Moscow International Film Festival
1988
Amazônia - Paraíso em Perigo				
Aventuras no Camel Trophy				
Aulas Muito Particulares				
The Lady from the Shanghai Cinema	Guilherme de Almeida Prado	Maitê Proença, Antônio Fagundes	Thriller	
The Long Haul	Paulo Thiago	Carlos Alberto Riccelli, Glória Pires, Dean Stockwell	Drama	
Luzia Homem	Fábio Barreto	Cláudia Ohana	Drama	
Prisoner of Rio	Lech Majewski	Steven Berkoff, Paul Freeman	Drama	
1989
Better Days Ahead	Carlos Diegues	Marília Pêra, Paulo José, Zezé Motta, José Wilker	Comedy drama	
O Amor nos Anos 90				
O Armário				
Isle of Flowers	Jorge Furtado	Júlia Barth, Paulo José, Ciça Reckziegel	Documentary	
Kuarup	Ruy Guerra	Taumaturgo Ferreira, Fernanda Torres	Drama	Entered into the 1989 Cannes Film Festival
