= Vai que É Mole =

1960 film directed by J. B. Tanko

Vai que é Mole
- Directed by: J. B. Tanko
- Written by: Edgar G. Alves; J. B. Tanko
- Produced by: Herbert Richers
- Starring: Grande Otelo; Ankito; Jô Soares
- Cinematography: Amleto Daissé
- Edited by: Rafael Justo Valverde
- Music by: Remo Usai
- Distributed by: Fama Filmes
- Release date: 1960
- Running time: 103 min.
- Country: Brazil
- Language: Portuguese

Vai que é Mole is a 1960 Brazilian film directed by J. B. Tanko and starring Grande Otelo, Ankito and Jô Soares.

== Plot ==
In this film, Grande Otelo, Ankito and Jô Soares are three thieves frequently searched by the police. Grande Otelo's character was having a crisis with his girlfriend due to his criminal lifestyle. However, things get even more complicated when Grande Otelo receives a letter from his aunt saying that she has sent her son. Grand Otelo's nephew, Zé Maria, is extremely Christian, and eventually wins over Grande Otelo, a fact that causes more problems than anticipated.
