= 1960 in Brazil =

Events in the year 1960 in Brazil.

== Incumbents ==
=== Federal government ===
- President: Juscelino Kubitschek
- Vice President: João Goulart

=== Governors ===
- Alagoas: Sebastião Muniz Falcão
- Amazonas: Gilberto Mestrinho
- Bahia: Juracy Magalhães
- Ceará: Parsifal Barroso
- Espírito Santo:Raul Giuberti
- Goiás: José Feliciano Ferreira
- Guanabara:
  - José Sette Câmara Filho (until 5 December)
  - Carlos Lacerda (from 5 December)
- Maranhão: José de Matos Carvalho
- Mato Grosso: João Ponce de Arruda
- Minas Gerais: José Francisco Bias Fortes
- Pará: Luís de Moura Carvalho
- Paraíba:
  - Pedro Gondim (until 18 March)
  - José Fernandes de Lima (from 18 March)
- Paraná: Moisés Lupion
- Pernambuco: Cid Sampaio
- Piauí: Chagas Rodrigues
- Rio de Janeiro: Roberto Silveira
- Rio Grande do Norte: Dinarte de Medeiros Mariz
- Rio Grande do Sul: Leonel Brizola
- Santa Catarina: Heriberto Hülse
- São Paulo: Carlos Alberto Alves de Carvalho Pinto
- Sergipe: Luís Garcia

=== Vice governors ===
- Alagoas: Sizenando Nabuco de Melo
- Bahia: Orlando Moscoso
- Ceará: Wilson Gonçalves
- Espírito Santo: Raul Giuberti
- Goiás: João de Abreu
- Maranhão: Alexandre Alves Costa
- Mato Grosso: Henrique José Vieira Neto
- Minas Gerais: Artur Bernardes Filho
- Paraíba: Pedro Gondim
- Pernambuco: Pelópidas da Silveira
- Piauí: Tibério Nunes
- Rio de Janeiro: Celso Peçanha
- Rio Grande do Norte: José Augusto Varela
- Santa Catarina: Vacant
- São Paulo: Porfírio da Paz
- Sergipe: Dionísio Machado

== Events ==
=== February ===
- February 25: : A Real Transportes Aéreos DC-3 collides with a US Navy DC-6 over Rio de Janeiro and crashes into Guanabara Bay, killing 66 people on board.

=== April ===
- April 21: The planned city of Brasília is inaugurated and becomes the country's new capital, replacing Rio de Janeiro. The old federal district of which Rio was part, becomes the state of Guanabara. By a decree timed to enter into force on the same day, a 22nd star representing the state of Guanabara is added to the flag of Brazil.

=== May ===
- May 10: The Cultural Union for the Friendship of the People organization is founded.

=== June ===
- June 14: A robbery on the payer train of the Estrada de Ferro Central do Brasil takes place in Japeri, Rio de Janeiro.

=== October ===
- October 3 - Jânio Quadros is elected President of Brazil for a five-year term, with 5.6 million votes — the highest vote ever obtained in Brazil.

== Births ==
=== January ===
- January 20: Edmar, footballer

=== March ===
- March 15: Carlos Roberto Bem-Te-Vi, announcer standard voice
- March 21: Ayrton Senna, racecar driver (died 1994)

=== August ===
- August 31: Lígia Cortez, actress

=== October ===
- October 5: Careca, professional footballer

== Deaths ==
- January 27: Osvaldo Aranha, politician (born 1894)

== See also ==
- 1960 in Brazilian football
- List of Brazilian films of 1960
