= Unidos do Porto da Pedra =

Samba school in Rio de Janeiro, Brazil

Porto da Pedra
- Foundation: 8 March 1978; 48 years ago
- Blessing school: União da Ilha

Grêmio Recreativo Escola de Samba Unidos do Porto da Pedra (commonly called Porto da Pedra or Unidos do Porto da Pedra) is a samba school currently headquartered in the municipality of São Gonçalo. The school was previously located in the city of Rio de Janeiro.

== History ==
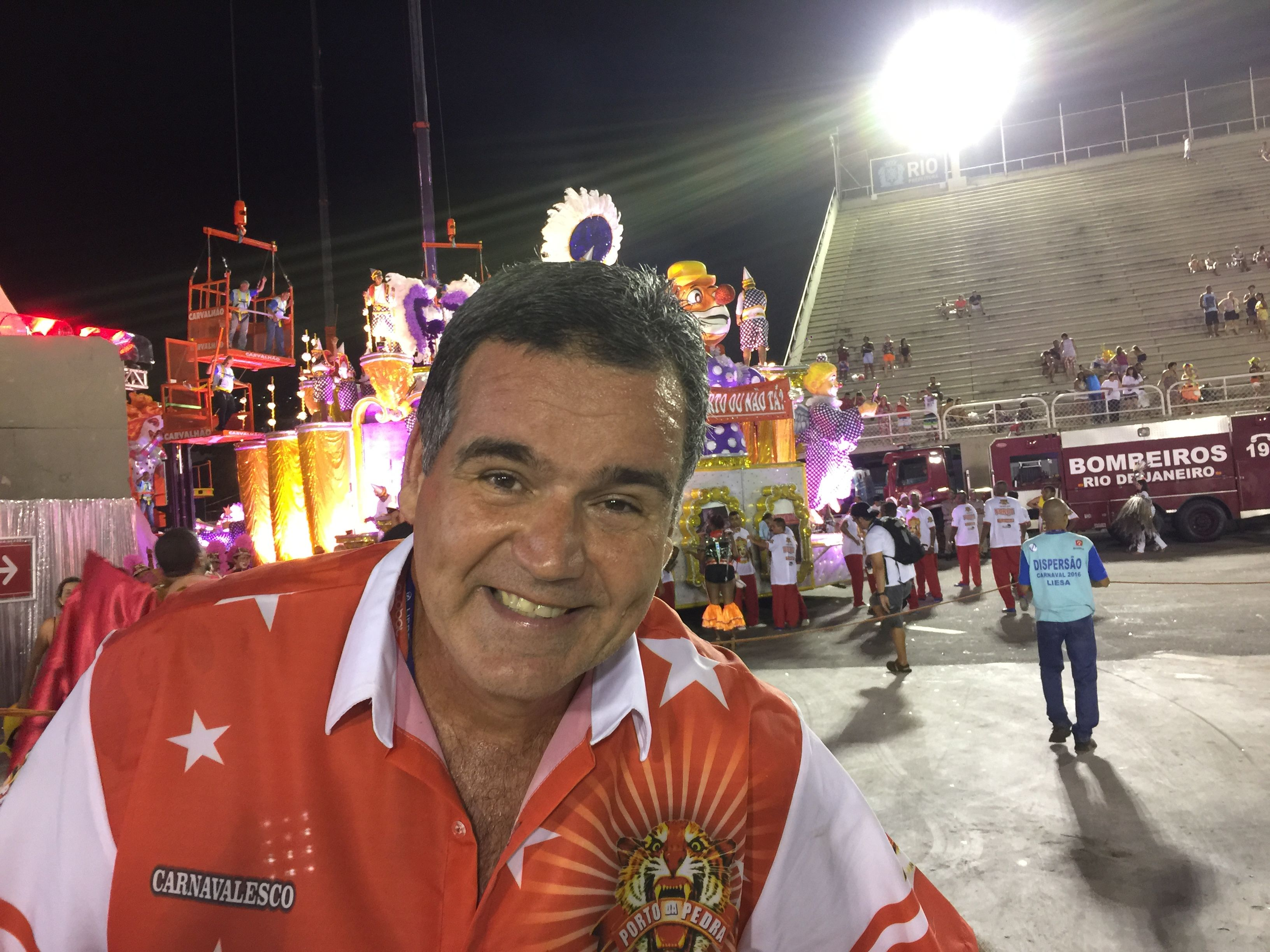
The carnival producer Jaime Cezário

Unidos do Porto da Pedra was originally known as Porto da Pedra Futebol Clube, having formed in the 1970s. The club's original colours were red and white. The club was formed by residents of its surrounding neighbourhood with the idea of forming a street block, that competed in 1975 and 1976.

On 8 March 1978 this carnival block was officially registered, with Harold Moreira named as president. The club's founders included José Carlos Rodrigues, José Paulo de Oliveira Chaffin, Jorair Ferreira, Jorge Brum, and Nilton Belomino Bispo.

Three years later, in 1981, the club reached the status of samba school; competing in Group B of the São Gonçalo Carnival. It came runner-up the following year. The club entered Group A, securing its first victory as samba school and ever since have abandoned the competitions and only came into its own neighborhood for many years.

For 1995, due to internal political problems in AESCRJ, LIESGA was created, that only existed for a Carnival but that modified the Groups 1, 2, 3, 4 for Groups A, B, C, D, E. in spite being correlation among such groups, the ascension and lowering ended having been respected and school that year it received an invitation Paulo de Almeida, then leader LIESGA, to adopt entity automatically of Thursday for second division.

Starting from then, the school had a great revelation in years of 1996 and 1997 where the champions' parade arrived. However, the destruction of in Porto da Pedra came soon afterwards in 1998 with the eminent fall the access and like this being in 2000. however to the school it returned the Special in 2002.

In the years in that it was in the special, it was always among the last positions, exceptions done of 2005, when it almost arrived to the champions parade and 2011, where due to the fire in the Cidade do Samba it finished in the 8th, but 2012 in a plot objected on the yogurt, the association dug his/her descent for Série A.

== Classifications ==
Year	Place	Division	Plot	Carnivals Producers	Singers
1994	Vice-Champion	Grupo D	Novo sol do amanhã		
1995	Champion	Grupo A	Campo, cidade em busca da felicidade	Mauro Quintaes	Wantuir
1996	9th place	Grupo Especial	A folia no mundo - Um carnaval dos carnavais	Mauro Quintaes	Wantuir
1997	5th place	Grupo Especial	No reino da folia, cada louco com sua mania	Mauro Quintaes	Wantuir
1998	13th place	Grupo Especial	Samba no pé e mãos ao alto, isto é um assalto!	Mauro Quintaes	Wantuir
1999	Vice-Champion	Grupo A	E na farofa do confete tem limão, tem serpentina...	Gilberto Muniz	Ito Melodia
2000	14th place	Grupo Especial	Ordem, Progresso, Amor e Folia no Milênio da Fantasia	Jaime Cezário	Ito Melodia
2001	Champion	Grupo A	Um sonho possível: crescer e viver agora é lei	Cahê Rodrigues	Ito Melodia
2002	11th place	Grupo Especial	Serra acima, rumo à Terra dos Coroados	Cahê Rodrigues	Preto Jóia
2003	11th place	Grupo Especial	Os donos da rua, um jeitinho brasileiro de ser	Mário Borriello	Preto Jóia
2004	11th place	Grupo Especial	Sou Tigre, Sou Porto da Pedra à Internet - Mensageiro da História da Vida do Leva e Traz	Alexandre Louzada	Preto Jóia
2005	7th place	Grupo Especial	Carnaval - Festa Profana	Alexandre Louzada	Luizinho Andanças
2006	12th place	Grupo Especial	Bendita És Tu Entre as Mulheres do Brasil	Cahê Rodrigues	Luizinho Andanças
2007	10th place	Grupo Especial	Preto e Branco a Cores	Milton Cunha	Luizinho Andanças
2008	11th place	Grupo Especial	100 anos de imigração japonesa no Brasil - Tem pagode no Maru	Mário Borriello	Luizinho Andanças
2009	10th place	Grupo Especial	Não me proíbam criar, pois preciso curiar! Sou o país do futuro e tenho muito a inventar!	Max Lopes	Luizinho Andanças
2010	10th place	Grupo Especial	Com que roupa eu vou? Pro samba que você me convidou	Paulo Menezes	Luizinho Andanças
2011	8th place	Grupo Especial	O sonho sempre vem pra quem sonhar...	Paulo Menezes	Luizinho Andanças
2012	12th place	Grupo Especial	Da Seiva Materna ao Equilíbrio da Vida	Jaime Cezário	Wander Pires
2013	9th place	Série A	Me digas o que calças, que eu te direis quem és	Leandro Valente	Igor Vianna
2014	4th place	Série A	Majestades do samba, os defensores do meu pavilhão	Leandro Valente	Anderson Paz
2015	11th place	Série A	Há uma luz que não se apaga	Wagner Gonçalves	Anderson Paz
2016	5th place	Série A	Palhaço Carequinha, paixão e orgulho de São Gonçalo. Tá certo ou não tá?	Jaime Cezário	Anderson Paz
2017	5th place	Série A	Ô Abre-alas que as Marchinhas vão passar! Porto da Pedra é quem vai ganhar... seu coração!	Jaime Cezário	Anderson Paz
2018	3rd place	Série A	Rainhas do rádio - nas ondas da emoção, o Tigre coroa as Divas da canção	Jaime Cezário	Luizinho Andanças
2019	3rd place	Série A	Antônio Pitanga - Um Negro em Movimento	Jaime Cezário	Luizinho Andanças
2020	3rd place	Série A	O que eh que a baiana tem? Do Bonfim a Sapucai	Annik Salmon	Pitty Di Menezes
2022	2nd place	Série Ouro	O Caçador que traz Alegrias	Annik Salmon	Pitty Di Menezes
2023	Champion	Série Ouro	A Invenção da Amazônia: Um delírio do imaginário de Júlio Verne	Mauro Quintaes	Nêgo
