= Tião Macalé =

Tião Macalé may refer to:

- Tião Macalé (comedian) (1926-1993), Brazilian comedian
- Tião Macalé (footballer) (1936-1972), Brazilian footballer
