= Os Trapalhões e o Mágico de Oróz =

1984 film directed by Dedé Santana

- Theatrical release poster
- Directed by: Dedé Santana; Vitor Lustosa
- Written by: Arnaud Rodrigues; Renato Aragão; Vitor Lustosa; Gilvan Pereira
- Produced by: Renato Aragão
- Starring: Renato Aragão; Dedé Santana; Antônio Carlos Gomes; Mauro Gonçalves
- Cinematography: Antônio Gonçalves
- Edited by: Denise Fontana; Jayme Justo
- Music by: Arnaud Rodrigues
- Production company: Renato Aragão Produções Artísticas
- Distributed by: Embrafilme
- Release date: June 21, 1984
- Running time: 93 minutes
- Country: Brazil
- Language: Portuguese

Os Trapalhões e o Mágico de Oróz (English: The Bumbling and the Wizard of Oróz) is the 1984 entry in the Brazilian comedy film series Os Trapalhões. This is a parody of The Wizard of Oz (1939). It was directed by Dedé Santana and Vitor Lustosa. It injects elements and actors of Cinema Novo into family film to direct attention to the ongoing drought in the Northeast, an issue that remains unresolved. It was shot in the city of Orós, in the state of Ceará.

== Overview ==
In addition to the regular members of Os Trapalhões—Renato Aragão, Dedé Santana, Antônio Carlos Gomes, and Mauro Gonçalves—, Xuxa Meneghel, José Dumont, Joffre Soares, and Arnaud Rodrigues, who wrote the songs, also appeared. Santana played the Cowardly Lion, a sheriff, Gonçalves/Zacarias played the Scarecrow, and Gomes/Mussum played Vat, a cachaça-filled variation on the Tin Woodman. Xuxa plays Sheriff Lion's girlfriend, Aninha. Aragão plays his regular protagonist, Didi Mocó. Soares, best known for his work in Cinema Novo, plays a judge who sentences Didi's fellow tramps Soró (Rodrigues) and Tatu (Dumont) to jail for stealing bread, while the Sheriff keeps Didi, the Scarecrow, and Vat in his charge to find water for the town. It is said that certain unusual sertanejos will come to the town and save them, and the travellers fit the bill, at least as an excuse to get rid of them and the cowardly sheriff. All of the town's water is on the lush estate of Colonel Ferreira, who rations it, and tries to seduce Aninha with no success. The Wizard of Oróz (Dary Reis) sends them to retrieve a water-spitting monster, in fact a giant faucet, that washerwomen in Rio de Janeiro utilize.

The film is also noted for its parody of the opening scene of Stanley Kubrick's 2001: A Space Odyssey, and for the cameo appearance of Tony Tornado as the leader of the vultures (deliberately replacing crows in the drought context) that terrorize the Scarecrow until they are eaten by the Tramps. Also, it shows Aragão's Christian side—in the film, he kisses the feet of the statue of Jesus Christ in Rio de Janeiro, though he wanted to kiss the hand, and the film also depicts scenes of the Virgin Mary, played by Bia Seidl, riding upon a donkey to Bethlehem.

== Reception ==
Rodrigo de Oliveira in his criticism for the Website Papo de Cinema wrote: "The year 1983 was problematic for the Trapalhões. (...) Six months after the fight, the quartet was again together, coproducing his new movie (... ) The split seems to have helped Directed by Dedé Santana and Victor Lustosa, the musical is one of the high moments of the movie troupe.

== Cast ==
- Renato Aragão as Didi Mocó
- Dedé Santana as Cowardly Lion
- Antonio Carlos "Mussum" Gomes as Tin Woodman
- Mauro "Zacarias" Gonçalves as Scarecrow
- Xuxa Meneghel as Aninha
- Dary Reis as the Wizard of Oróz
- José Dumont as Tatu
- Arnaud Rodrigues as Soró
- Maurício do Valle as Colonel Ferreira
- Joffre Soares as Judge
- Tony Tornado as Vulture's líder
- Roberto Guilherme as Merchant
- Dino Santana as Beatus of Desert
- Bia Seidl as Virgin Mary
- Fernando José
- Wilson Viana
