= Os Trapalhões no Reino da Fantasia =

1985 film directed by Dedé Santana

- Directed by: Dedé Santana
- Written by: Renato Aragão; Dedé Santana; Jorge Fernando; Paulo Andrade (as Paulo de Andrade); Márcio de Souza
- Produced by: Renato Aragão
- Starring: Renato Aragão; Dedé Santana; Antônio Carlos Gomes; Mauro Gonçalves; Xuxa Meneghel
- Cinematography: Reinaldo Barbirato (as José Reinaldo Barbiratto) (animation); José Tadeu Ribeiro
- Music by: Caxa Aragão
- Production companies: Renato Aragão Produções; Mauricio de Sousa Produções
- Distributed by: Embrafilme
- Release date: June 29, 1985
- Running time: 80 minutes
- Country: Brazil
- Language: Portuguese

Os Trapalhões no Reino da Fantasia (English: The Bumbling in the Kingdom of Fantasy) is a 1985 Brazilian live-action/animated film, directed by Dedé Santana and starring by Os Trapalhões. The animation was produced by Mauricio de Sousa Produções, known for Monica's Gang comics and animation.

== Plot ==
The orphanage St. Jude, directed by Irmã Maria, financial difficulties that can take you to lock and utter helplessness to their children. Irmã Maria, watching a cartoon, has the great idea that can save the institution: use the Trapalhões - unconditional friends of children - and ask them to do a show to raise funds to save their children. Didi, Dede, Mussum and Zacarias perform a special show attracting a large audience. The audience vibrates with the mess and play Quartet. But unfortunately the show attracted not only good people, but also a gang of evil bandits trying to steal the money raised from the show. Irmã Maria inadvertently realize what is happening, try to react, but the bad guys, the stronger the hold. Theater background, Didi see the confusion and tries in vain to help the novice. After fights, the bad guys can get away with the bag of money, leaving Didi and Sister Maria fainted. Dede, missing Didi on stage, get out your search and find the two desacordados. Didi, Dede and the novice out an incredible and tumultuous pursuit of the bandits in the hope of recovering the stolen money. On the way, Didi faces thousand adventures and confusion, and even a wizard attempts to disrupt. Realizing they are being followed, the bandits enter the Beto Carrero Rodeo to lose them. Dress up cowboys and try to escape Didi, scene making huge success with the turning of the public. In this confusion, Beto Carrero recognizes Didi and goes to her aid, chasing the bandits, and in an act of adventure and action, Didi retrieves the bag with the money and all come back to the theater. Meanwhile, oblivious to all the confusion faced by his companions, Mussum and Zechariah follow with the show. Come Didi, Dede and Sister Maria followed by bandits performing many fights. When all seems lost, the Trapalhões are saved by a mysterious weapon. Many applause, captured bandits. Sister Maria explains to the audience what really happened throughout the show. In this moment of complete joy, Didi realize you're with the wrong bag, no money. But sadness is short-lived, and a great surprise is reserved for the end.

== Reception ==
Robledo Milani in his criticism of the website Papo de Cinema wrote: "With this screenplay that looks more like a patchwork and the weak direction of Dedé Santana, concerned only with repeating old jokes rather than providing something new to an audience that until then was The Trapalhões in the Fantasia Kingdom had one of the worst box-office performances of the group's productions in that period - even though it added almost 2 million spectators. Still, it was enough to keep repeating such dubious partnerships. less served to give the public a break, for any more attentive spectator revealed something more serious: the exhaustion of a formula that, unfortunately, would have few original sighs to offer in the following years.

== Cast ==
- Renato Aragão .... Didi
- Dedé Santana .... Dedé
- Antônio Carlos Gomes .... Mussum
- Mauro Gonçalves .... Zacarias
- Xuxa Meneghel .... Irmã Maria
- Athayde Arcoverde
- Beto Carrero .... Himself
- Maurício do Valle
- Antônio Duarte
- Celso Magno
- José Vasconcelos .... Bruxo (narration)
- Luiz Viana
- Eduardo Vilaverde

== See also ==
- List of Brazilian films of the 1980s
