= O Noviço Rebelde =

1997 film directed by Tizuka Yamasaki

- Directed by: Tizuka Yamasaki
- Written by: Renato Aragão
- Produced by: Renato Aragão
- Starring: Renato Aragão; Dedé Santana; Tony Ramos; Patrícia Pillar; Luma de Oliveira; Sandy Leah; Junior Lima
- Cinematography: Cezar Moraes
- Edited by: Diana Vasconcellos
- Production company: Renato Aragão Produções Artísticas
- Release date: 25 December 1997
- Running time: 91 minutes
- Country: Brazil
- Language: Portuguese
- Box office: $5.2 million (Brazil)

O Noviço Rebelde is a 1997 Brazilian comedy film written by, produced by, and starring Renato Aragão. Directed by Tizuka Yamasaki, the film is a parody of the 1965 American film The Sound of Music. It was the highest-grossing locally produced film during 1998. It was shot in Beberibe, Ceará.

== Cast ==
- Renato Aragão as Didi
- Dedé Santana as Dedé
- Tony Ramos as Felipe
- Patrícia Pillar as Maria do Céu
- Luma de Oliveira as Teresa
- Cláudio Corrêa e Castro as Father Manuel
- Sandy Leah as Márcia
- Junior Lima as Junior
- Alessandra Aguiar as Vicky
- Wallan Renato as Dudu
- Pedro Kling as Julinho
- Gugu Liberato as Announcer
- Chitãozinho & Xororó as Themselves
- Roberto Guilherme as Colonel Pereira
- Terezinha Elisa as Dalila
- Thelma Reston as Zelda
- Inês Galvão as Laura
- Ary Sherlock as Father Antônio
