= A Princesa Xuxa e os Trapalhões =

1989 film directed by José Alvarenga Júnior

- Directed by: José Alvarenga Jr.
- Written by: Mauro Wilson; Paulo de Andrade; Carlos Alberto Diniz; Roberto Silveira
- Produced by: Renato Aragão
- Starring: Renato Aragão; Antônio Carlos Gomes; Dedé Santana; Mauro Gonçalves; Xuxa Meneghel; Paulo Reis
- Cinematography: Nonato Estrela
- Production companies: Renato Aragão Produçoes Artisticas; Xuxa Produçoes
- Distributed by: Columbia Pictures; Art Films
- Release date: June 22, 1989
- Running time: 112 minutes
- Country: Brazil
- Language: Portuguese

A Princesa Xuxa e os Trapalhões (English: The Princess Xuxa and the Scatterbrains) is a 1989 Brazilian adventure film, directed by José Alvarenga Jr and starring Xuxa Meneghel and Os Trapalhões.

== Plot ==
On the planet Antar in the right arm of the Milky Way, the evil Ratan usurps the throne after the emperor dies. Using all the kingdom's military power, he forces children into slave labor. Princess Xaron, who is trapped inside the palace and unaware of what is happening outside, thinks the people are happy. Three princes, Zacaling, Mussaim, and Dedeon, join forces with the "Nameless Knight" to defeat Ratan and free the children.

== Reception ==
=== Commercial ===
Matheus Bonez in his criticism of the website Papo de Cinema wrote, "Production may not be a thing of the past, but it does not have to be negative about it. Even the 'performances' of the cast, in general, do not compromise fun more than guaranteed. (...) A legitimate afternoon session without commitment."

=== Box office ===
It had 4.3 million spectators in the cinema. It was marketed to Portugal in 1990.

== Cast ==
- Renato Aragão .... Diron, the Nameless Knight
- Antônio Carlos "Mussum" Gomes .... Mussaim
- Dedé Santana .... Dedeon
- Mauro "Zacarias" Gonçalves .... Zacaling
- Xuxa Meneghel .... Princess Xaron
- Paulo Reis .... Emperor Ratan
- Trem da Alegria .... slave children

== See also ==
- List of Brazilian films of the 1980s
