= List of Brazilian films of 1981 =

A list of films produced in Brazil in 1981:

Title	Director	Cast	Genre	Notes
Aluga-se Moças	Deni Cavalcanti	Gretchen, Rita Cadillac	Pornochanchada	
Amélia, Mulher de Verdade	Deni Cavalcanti	Solange Theodoro, Edgar Franco, Elizabeth Hartmann, Joffre Soares	Pornochanchada	
Anjos do Sexo	Levi Salgado, Lady Francisco	Lady Francisco, Carlos Henrique Santos, Nice Ayres, Lia Farrell,	Pornochanchada	
Anarquia Sexual	Antônio Meliande	Meiry Vieira, Heitor Galotti	Erotic	
Aqui, Tarados!	David Cardoso, John Doo, Ody Fraga	Sonia Garcia, Zaira Bueno, Alvamar Taddei, Arthur Rovedeer, Jeferson Pezeta	Erotic	
Asa Branca: Um Sonho Brasileiro	Djalma Limongi Batista	Edson Celulari	Drama	
Bacanal	Antônio Meliande	John Herbert, Aldine Muller, Patrícia Scalvi, José Carlos Sanches	Erotic	
Bonitinha, mas Ordinária ou Otto Lara Resende	Braz Chediak	Lucélia Santos, José Wilker, Vera Fischer	Drama	
Eros, o Deus do Amor	Walter Hugo Khouri	Roberto Maya, Lilian Lemmertz, Norma Bengell, Dina Sfat, Renée de Vielmond	Erotic drama	
O Fotógrafo	Jean Garrett	Patrícia Scalvi, Roberto Miranda	Erotic drama	
O Homem que Virou Suco	João Batista de Andrade	José Dumont, Celia Maracajá	Drama	Won the Golden Prize at the 12th Moscow International Film Festival
I Love You	Arnaldo Jabor	Sônia Braga, Paulo César Peréio	Erotic drama	Screened at the 1981 Cannes Film Festival
O Incrível Monstro Trapalhão	Adriano Stuart	Os Trapalhões	Comedy	
A Mulher Sensual	Antônio Calmon	Helena Ramos, Paulo Ramos, Alcione Mazzeo	Erotic	
O Mundo Mágico dos Trapalhões	Silvio Tendler	Chico Anysio (narrator)	Documentary	As of 2007, the most watched Brazilian documentary of all time
Mulher Objeto	Silvio de Abreu	Helena Ramos, Nuno Leal Maia	Erotic drama	
Orgia das Libertinas	Ary Fernandes	Felipe Levy, Fátima Celebrini, Ruy Leal, Marliani Gomes, Márcio Prado, Lia Furlin	Erotic	
They Don't Wear Black-tie	Leon Hirszman	Gianfrancesco Guarnieri, Fernanda Montenegro, Carlos Alberto Riccelli, Bete Mendes	Drama	Won the Special Jury Prize at the Venice Film Festival
Os Saltimbancos Trapalhões	J. B. Tanko	Os Trapalhões, Lucinha Lins	Comedy	The most watched Brazilian film in 1981

== See also ==
- 1981 in Brazil
- 1981 in Brazilian television
