= Os Trapalhões na Guerra dos Planetas =

1978 film directed by Adriano Stuart

- Directed by: Adriano Stuart
- Written by: Renato Aragão; Hélio Ribeiro
- Produced by: Renato Aragão; Hélio Ribeiro
- Starring: Renato Aragão; Manfried Sant'Anna; Antonio Carlos Gomes; Mauro Gonçalves
- Cinematography: Antônio Moreira
- Edited by: Luiz Teixeira
- Music by: Beto Strada
- Production companies: Renato Aragão Produções; TV Globo
- Distributed by: Art 4 Filmes; Embrafilme
- Release date: December 18, 1978
- Running time: 98 minutes
- Country: Brazil
- Language: Portuguese

Os Trapalhões na Guerra dos Planetas (lit: The Bunglers in the War of the Planets) is a 1978 Brazilian parody film directed by Adriano Stuart. It is the thirteenth film of the Brazilian comedy group Os Trapalhões, starring Renato Aragão, Manfried Sant'Anna, Antonio Carlos Gomes, and Mauro Gonçalves. The film is a parody of the American film Star Wars. Outside of Brazil, mainly in English-speaking countries, this film is known by the suggestive title of Brazilian Star Wars. It features characters resembling Luke Skywalker, Princess Leia, Darth Vader, Chewbacca, and Stormtroopers.

Guerra dos Planetas was Mauro Gonçalves's first appearance in a film as his character Zacarias.

== Cast ==
- Renato Aragão as Didi
- Manfried Sant'Anna as Dedé
- Antonio Carlos Gomes as Mussum
- Mauro Gonçalves as Zacarias (his first film with Os Trapalhões)
- Pedro Aguinaga as Prince Flick (parody of Luke Skywalker)
- Carlos Bucka as Zuco
- Wilma Dias as Loya
- Carlos Kurt as Igor
- Maria Cristina as Princess Myrna (parody of Princess Leia)
- Emil Rached as Bonzo (parody of Chewbacca)

== Production ==
Because of the special effects, the film was shot in videotape format, but was later expanded to 35mm in the United States, although there are legal restrictions on showing the material outside Brazil.
