= Carlos Kurt =

Brazilian actor (1933–2003)

- Born: February 10, 1933; Rio de Janeiro, Brazil
- Died: March 4, 2003 (aged 70); Rio de Janeiro, Brazil
- Occupation: Actor

Carlos Kurt (Rio de Janeiro, February 10, 1933; Rio de Janeiro, March 4, 2003) born José Carlos Kunstat, was a Brazilian actor. He is most known for his role of supporting character in the Brazilian comedic series Os Trapalhões and some of its films. He suffered from Alzheimer's disease and died in 2003.

== Filmography ==
=== Film ===
- 1968: Os Carrascos Estão Entre Nós
- 1969: 2000 Anos de Confusão
- 1971: Tô na Tua, Ô Bicho
- 1975: Costinha, o Rei da Selva
- 1976: Simbad, o Marujo Trapalhão - Ali Tuffi
- 1976: O Trapalhão no Planalto dos Macacos
- 1977: Prá Ficar Nua, Cachê Dobrado
- 1977: O Trapalhão nas Minas do Rei Salomão - Aristóbulo
- 1978: Os Trapalhões na Guerra dos Planetas - Zucco
- 1978: Bonitas e Gostosas
- 1979: Moonraker - Airport Metal Detector Guard (uncredited)
- 1979: Sexo e Sangue
- 1979: O Rei e os Trapalhões
- 1979: O Cinderelo Trapalhão
- 1979: As Borboletas Também Amam
- 1980: O Incrível Monstro Trapalhão
- 1980: Os Três Mosqueteiros Trapalhões
- 1980: Os Paspalhões em Pinóquio 2000
- 1980: O Inseto do Amor
- 1981: Os Saltimbancos Trapalhões
- 1982: Os Vagabundos Trapalhões
- 1983: O Trapalhão na Arca de Noé
- 1984: A Filha dos Trapalhões
- 1984: Non c'è due senza quattro
- 1986: Os Trapalhões e o Rei do Futebol - Cartola (uncredited)

=== Television ===
- Os Trapalhões
- Champagne (1983)

== Materia na Veja ==
Link para materia na Revista Veja SP
