= 1981 in Brazilian television =

This is a list of Brazilian television related events from 1981.

== Events ==
- August 19 - SBT launches.

== Debuts ==
- March 16 - Baila Comigo

== Television shows ==
=== 1970s ===
- Turma da Mônica (1976–present)
- Sítio do Picapau Amarelo (1977–1986)

== Births ==
- 26 February - Miá Mello, actress & comedian
- 28 March - Beto Marden, TV host, singer & actor
- 29 May - Fernanda Motta, model, actress & TV host
- 6 July - Marco Antônio Gimenez, actor, model & TV host
- 1 November - Thiago Fragoso, actor & singer

== See also ==
- 1981 in Brazil
- List of Brazilian films of 1981
