= 1981 in Brazil =

Events in the year 1981 in Brazil.

== Incumbents ==
=== Federal government ===
- President: General João Figueiredo
- Vice President: Aureliano Chaves

=== Governors ===
- Acre: Vacant
- Alagoas: Guilherme Palmeira
- Amazonas: José Bernardino Lindoso
- Bahia: Antônio Carlos Magalhães
- Ceará: Virgílio Távora
- Espírito Santo: Eurico Vieira Resende
- Goiás: Ary Valadão
- Maranhão: João Castelo
- Mato Grosso: Frederico Campos
- Mato Grosso do Sul: Pedro Pedrossian
- Minas Gerais: Francelino Pereira
- Pará: Alacid Nunes
- Paraíba: Tarcísio Burity
- Paraná: Nei Braga
- Pernambuco: Marco Maciel
- Piauí: Lucídio Portela
- Rio de Janeiro: Antônio Chagas Freitas
- Rio Grande do Norte: Lavoisier Maia
- Rio Grande do Sul: José Augusto Amaral de Souza
- Santa Catarina: Jorge Bornhausen
- São Paulo: Paulo Maluf
- Sergipe: Augusto Franco

=== Vice governors ===
- Acre: José Fernandes Rego
- Alagoas: Teobaldo Vasconcelos Barbosa
- Amazonas: Paulo Pinto Nery
- Bahia: Luis Viana Neto
- Ceará: Manuel de Castro Filho
- Espírito Santo: José Carlos Fonseca
- Goiás: Rui Brasil Cavalcanti
- Maranhão: Artur Teixeira de Carvalho
- Mato Grosso: José Vilanova Torres
- Mato Grosso do Sul: Vacant
- Minas Gerais: João Marques de Vasconcelos
- Pará: Gerson dos Santos Peres
- Paraíba: Clóvis Cavalcanti
- Paraná: José Hosken de Novaes
- Pernambuco: Roberto Magalhães Melo
- Piauí: Waldemar de Castro Macedo
- Rio de Janeiro: Hamilton Xavier
- Rio Grande do Norte: Geraldo Melo
- Rio Grande do Sul: Otávio Badui Germano
- Santa Catarina: Henrique Hélion Velho de Córdova
- São Paulo: José Maria Marin
- Sergipe: Djenal Tavares Queiroz

== Events ==
=== January ===
- January 6: A passenger ship called Novo Amapá was sunk by an overcrowded capacity off of a river mouth in Caja, Pará State. According to the Transport Ministry of Brazil, there was a confirmed report of at least 130 fatalities.
- January 13-17: Canadian Prime Minister Pierre Trudeau makes his visit to Brazil to meet President João Figueiredo at the Planalto Palace the following day.

=== April ===
- April 30: Two bombs explode inside a car at the Pavilhão Riocentro, in Rio de Janeiro, during a concert commemorating Labor Day. Sergeant Guilherme Pereira do Rosário is killed and Captain Wilson Dias Machado is injured; both of the Brazilian Army.

=== August ===
- August 19: The Brazilian television network Sistema Brasileiro de Televisão (SBT) is launched by businessman and television personality Silvio Santos.

=== September ===
- September 12: President João Figueiredo inaugurates the JK Memorial in Brasília.
- September 19: According to an official report from the Transport Ministry of Brazil, a passenger ferry, called the Sobral Santos II was capsized nearby Óbidos Port, Pará State, on the Amazon River, where more than 300 people drowned.

=== December ===
- December 22: President João Figueiredo signs a law, creating the state of Rondônia.

== Births ==
=== January ===
- January 21: Michel Teló, singer

=== February ===
- February 4 – Sabrina Sato, television presenter

=== March ===
- March 1 – Ana Hickmann, model

=== April ===
- April 11 – Alessandra Ambrosio, model
- April 25 – Felipe Massa, race car driver
- April 26 – Mariana Ximenes, actress

=== June ===
- June 12 – Adriana Lima, model
- June 24 – Júnior Assunção, mixed martial artist
- June 25 – Carlo Prater, mixed martial artist
- June 27 – Cléber Santana, footballer (d. 2016)
- June 29 – Maria Maya, actress

=== July ===
- July 5 – Gianne Albertoni, model
- July 19 – Anderson Luiz de Carvalho, footballer
- July 26 – Maicon Douglas Sisenando, footballer

=== August ===
- August 31 – Mosiah Rodrigues, gymnist

=== October ===
- October 11 – Arturo Ruas, professional wrestler

=== November ===
- November 4 – Adriana Araujo, boxer

=== December ===
- December 28 – Wilton Sampaio, FIFA football referee

== Deaths ==
=== June ===
- June 13 – Amácio Mazzaropi, actor (b. 1912)

=== August ===
- August 18 – Carolina Nabuco, writer and translator (b. 1890)
- August 22 – Glauber Rocha, film director (b. 1939)

== See also ==
- 1981 in Brazilian football
- 1981 in Brazilian television
- List of Brazilian films of 1981
