= Dino Santana =

Brazilian actor

- Born: Ondino Sant'Anna; August 9, 1940; Niterói, Rio de Janeiro, Brazil
- Died: December 26, 2010 (aged 70); Rio de Janeiro City, Rio de Janeiro, Brazil
- Occupation: Actor
- Years active: 1965-2010

Ondino Sant'Anna (Niterói, August 9, 1940 — Rio de Janeiro City, December 26, 2010) known artistically as Dino Santana, was a Brazilian actor and brother of the famous comedian Dedé Santana. He is most known for his role of supporting character in the Brazilian comedic series Os Trapalhões and some of its films. He suffered from prostate cancer and died in 2010.

== Television ==
- 1965: Maloca e Bonitão (TV Tupi) - Bonitão
- 1974-1976: Os Trapalhões (TV Tupi)
- 1978-1993: Os Trapalhões (Rede Globo)
- 2004-2008: Dedé e o Comando Maluco (SBT) - Português

== Cinema ==
- 1969: Deu uma Louca no Cangaço
- 1969: 2000 Anos de Confusão - Bonitao
- 1970: A Ilha dos Paqueras - Commander Dino
- 1970: Se Meu Dólar Falasse
- 1972: Os Desempregados
- 1975: Zé Sexy...Louco, Muito Louco Por Mulher
- 1976: O Mulherengo
- 1979: O Rei e Os Trapalhões - Guarda Real
- 1979: O Cinderelo Trapalhão
- 1979: Eu Matei Lúcio Flávio
- 1983: Atrapalhando a Suate
- 1984: Os Trapalhões e o Mágico de Oróz (O Beato do deserto)
- 1984: A Filha dos Trapalhões - González
- 1986: Os Trapalhões e o Rei do Futebol - Reporter (uncredited)
- 1987: Os Fantasmas Trapalhões - (final film role)
