= Os Trapalhões e o Rei do Futebol =

1986 film directed by Carlos Manga

- Theatrical release poster
- Directed by: Carlos Manga
- Written by: Aguinaldo Silva; Ricardo Linhares
- Produced by: Caique Martins Ferreira
- Starring: Renato Aragão; Pelé; Dedé Santana; Antônio Carlos Gomes; Mauro Gonçalves; Luiza Brunet; José Lewgoy
- Cinematography: Edgar Moura; Lula Araújo
- Edited by: Marco Antonio Cury
- Music by: Sérgio Guilherme Saraceni
- Production companies: Renato Aragão Produções; Pelé-Saad Produções
- Distributed by: Embrafilme
- Release date: 26 June 1986
- Running time: 74 minutes
- Country: Brazil
- Language: Portuguese

Os Trapalhões e o Rei do Futebol (English: The Tramps and the King of Football) is a Brazilian comedy film released in 1986, directed by Carlos Manga with the humoristic group Os Trapalhões and the former player Pelé. It was watched by about 3.6 million people in 1986.

== Cast ==
- Renato Aragão .... Cardeal
- Pelé .... Nascimento
- Dedé Santana .... Elvis
- Antônio Carlos "Mussum" Gomes .... Fumê
- Mauro "Zacarias" Gonçalves .... Tremoço
- Luiza Brunet .... Aninha
- José Lewgoy .... Dr. Velhaccio
- Milton Moraes .... Dr. Barros Barreto
- Maurício do Valle .... Edésio
- Marcelo Ibrahim .... Sansão
- Older Cazarré .... Seu Mané
