= Os Trapalhões =

Brazilian comedy group and TV series

- The Trapalhões: Mussum (green shirt), Zacarias (blue and yellow shirt) Dedé (blue shirt) and Didi (white shirt)
- Created by: Wilton Franco
- Country of origin: Brazil

Production
- Producer: Rede Globo

Original release
- Network: TV Tupi
- Release: 1975 – 1977
- Network: Rede Globo
- Release: 1977 – August 14, 2000

Os Trapalhões (Portuguese pronunciation: [us tɾapaˈʎõjs]) was a Brazilian comedy group and a television series of the same name created by Wilton Franco. Its members Dedé Santana, Zacarias, Mussum and their leader Didi Mocó (Renato Aragão). The name Os Trapalhões (which can be translated as The Bumbling Ones or The Clumsy Ones) is derived from the Portuguese verb atrapalhar, which means the opposite of helping, to do something the wrong way or to Those that confuse. The name is translated "Tramps" in English DVD subtitles. It originally aired on Rede Tupi from 1975 to 1977 and the show later moved to Rede Globo and remained there from 1977 to 1993 (with new episodes), and from 1994 to 2000 (with reruns).

On March 18, 1990, Zacarias died due to respiratory failure, but the group it has come to an end officially only on July 29, 1994, when Mussum died due to an unsuccessful heart transplant (after facing health problems since the end of 1993, when Globo stopped producing new episodes of the series).

== Premise ==
The series consisted of several different sketches featuring comic adventures and situations of the four protagonists. The sketches would sometimes feature only one of them (mostly Didi), two, three or all four of them. In those, they would often try to outsmart each other or a common foe, by making pranks or working together to achieve a common goal. Some of these sketches also parodied comics' superheroes, such as Superman (mostly played by Didi because of his leader role), Batman (played mostly by Dedé), Spider-Man, Hulk, He-Man, The Phantom, etc.

== Cast ==
Didi (Superman) and Dedé (Batman in his 1989 film costume), in a parody of The death of Superman. At left, Robin's legs.

=== Main characters ===
- Didi Mocó (Renato Aragão) - The leader of the group who however, in some scenes, was treated by his three friends as the most worthless member. A very clever man from Ceará with a peculiar manner of speaking. He rarely ended the scenes with bad luck or as the loser, in which he "fought" enemies or even his own friends.
- Dedé (Dedé Santana) - Interpreted as a "second in command" role. He was the most serious one and acted as the brain of the group. His masculinity was always questioned and mocked by Didi.
- Mussum (Antônio Carlos Gomes) - An Afro-Brazilian man who was ever proud to say that he came from Morro da Mangueira, a slum in Rio de Janeiro. He also had a very peculiar vocabulary. His greatest passion being cachaça (the most common distilled beverage in Brazil), which he nicknamed "mé" (or "mel", Portuguese for honey). He was always the butt of jokes and nicknames because of his skin color, as to be sarcastically called Maizena (Corn Starch) by Didi or then the latter's insinuations and innuendos comparing his skin color to that of a vulture's, at which Mussum would become verbally (sometimes physically) aggressive and answer back with offensive jokes about Didi's own northeastern origins or even his own mother.
- Zacarias (Mauro Gonçalves) - A stocky, little man with child's voice and mannerism — frequently putting on childlike tantrums in face of trouble or even role playing as a kid when the sketch asked for it. He also wore a wig due to baldness. This was exploited in sketches where it would be taken off either by Didi or by any other adversity such as an arrow which, missing his head, stabbed the wig to the wall, for instance.

=== Supporting characters ===
Didi (left), as a waiter, being bullied by Carlos Kurt in one scene.

- Dino Santana - Dedé real life's brother. He played several secondary roles throughout the series and in some Trapalhões films. He died in 2010.
- Carlos Kurt - A tall blonde man with a very bad look and huge eyes. He often played a villain, bully or other enemy roles in the series and also in some Trapalhões' films (possibly inspired by actor Klaus Kinski). He died in 2003.
- Roberto Guilherme - An obese, bald and also tall man with whom Didi always had fun by taking off his wig. Also played a large number of antagonist roles, sometimes along Carlos Kurt. Though he played numerous secondary characters, the most memorable of them was the Sargento Pincel (Sergeant Brush), who led an army in which the Trapalhões acted as privates. Dead in 2022.
- Tião Macalé - A very funny toothless black man that usually ended the scenes saying the word Nojento! (Portuguese for "disgusting"). This quote make him very famous both in the series and in Brazil. Moisés Bruno dos Santos Gregório, the actor who gave life to the character, died in 1993.
- Ted Boy Marino - A real-life wrestler with a Spanish accent (though being of Italian origin) and haircut similar to He-Man's. He died in 2012.

== Film Series ==
Their first film, Na Onda do Iê-Iê-Iê (1966), featured only the duo Didi and Dedé. Twenty-one films were produced with the classic quartet, starting with Os Trapalhões na Guerra dos Planetas (1978) and continuing through Uma Escola Atrapalhada (1990). More than one hundred and twenty million people have seen Os Trapalhões' films, and seven of these films are on the list of the ten biggest box office hits in Brazilian cinema.

- A Pedra do Tesouro (1965; short film, first appearance of Didi and Dedé)
- Na Onda do Iê-Iê-Iê (1966)
- Adorável Trapalhão (1967; Didi only)
- Dois na Lona (1968; Didi only)
- Bonga, o Vagabundo (1969; Didi only)
- A Ilha dos Paqueras (1970)
- Ali Babá e os 40 Ladrões (1972)
- Aladim e a Lâmpada Maravilhosa (1973)
- Robin Hood, o Trapalhão da Floresta (1973)
- O Trapalhão na Ilha do Tesouro (1974)
- Simbad, o Marujo Trapalhão (1975)
- O Trapalhão no Planalto dos Macacos (1976; first appearance of Mussum)
- O Trapalhão nas Minas do Rei Salomão (1977)
- Os Trapalhões na Guerra dos Planetas (1978; first appearance of Zacarias)
- Cinderelo Trapalhão (1979)
- O Rei e os Trapalhões (1979)
- Os Três Mosqueteiros Trapalhões (1980)
- O Incrível Monstro Trapalhão (1981)
- O Mundo Mágico dos Trapalhões (1981)
- Os Saltimbancos Trapalhões (1981)
- Os Vagabundos Trapalhões (1982)
- Os Trapalhões na Serra Pelada (1982)
- O Cangaceiro Trapalhão (1983)
- Atrapalhando a Suate (1983; Dedé, Mussum and Zacarias only)
- O Trapalhão na Arca de Noé (1983; Didi only)
- Os Trapalhões e o Mágico de Oróz (1984)
- A Filha dos Trapalhões (1984)
- Os Trapalhões no Reino da Fantasia (1985)
- Os Trapalhões no Rabo do Cometa (1986)
- Os Trapalhões e o Rei do Futebol (1986)
- Os Trapalhões no Auto da Compadecida (1987)
- Os Fantasmas Trapalhões (1987)
- Os Heróis Trapalhões (1988)
- O Casamento dos Trapalhões (1988)
- A Princesa Xuxa e os Trapalhões (1989)
- Os Trapalhões na Terra dos Monstros (1989)
- Uma Escola Atrapalhada (1990; final appearance of Zacarias)
- O Mistério de Robin Hood (1990)
- Os Trapalhões e a Árvore da Juventude (1991; final appearance of Mussum)
- O Noviço Rebelde (1997)
- Simão, o Fantasma Trapalhão (1998)
- O Trapalhão e a Luz Azul (1999)
- Os Saltimbancos Trapalhões: Rumo a Hollywood (2017)

== Media ==
=== Comics ===
Many comic book series based on Trapalhões were published over the decades. The first series was published by "Bloch Editores" between 1976 and 1986, lasting 83 issues. These comics were produced by the cartoonist Ely Barbosa and the early issues notably also featured Felix the Cat stories. A spin-off title focused solely on Didi entitled "Aventuras do Didi" was also published by Bloch between 1981 and 1986 lasting 42 issues. The comics were sold usually in digest size.

A new series was later published by Abril, produced between 1988 and 1993, lasting 73 issues. This second series notably followed the "babyfication" trend by featuring the characters redesigned as children by cartoonist César Sandoval (also known for the comic series A Turma do Arrepio). This series kept the character Zacarias even after the death of his actor in 1990. A spin-off title featuring stories parodying films and series entitled "As Aventuras dos Trapalhões" was also published between 1989 and 1994 lasting 51 issues. This comic was known for not only making references to American media, but also to Japanese tokusatsus such as Changeman, Jiraiya, Cybercop and Kamen Rider Black.

Several years after the end of Os Trapalhões, the character Didi was still used for new comics by the publisher Escala, such as "As Aventuras do Didizinho", released between 2002 and 2005 with 21 issues, also featuring a child version of the character, and "Didi & Lili - Geração Mangá" released between 2010 and 2011 with 10 issues, notably featuring an art style inspired by Japanese comics and featuring the character Lili (based on Aragão's daughter Lívian Aragão) as a co-protagonist.

=== Music ===
The group also recorded a few musical comedy albums and singles.

=== Video-game ===
The game Pickaxe Pete originally released for Odyssey in 1982 was published in 1983 in Brazil as Didi na Mina Encantada, featuring Renato Aragão's character on the game's cover.

== Inspired series ==
After the success of the film O Noviço Rebelde in 1997, the following year Renato Aragão returned to present a new comedy show on Globo entitled "A Turma do Didi" which served as a successor to Os Trapalhões airing on Sunday afternoons on Globo, but focused on the younger audience with a new cast of actors, initially with Debby Lagranha, Vanessa Bueno, Eliezer Motta and André Segatti. Later in 2003 the program was reformulated with a new cast of supporting actors such as Tadeu Mello, Marcelo Augusto, Jacaré, Kleber Bambam and others, bringing it closer to the classic format of Os Trapalhões with Dedé joining the cast in 2008. The success of the series led Aragão to use the image of his character Didi more, starring in new films and producing some products aimed at children. The series ended in 2010 and was replaced in the same year by "Aventuras do Didi", which aired until 2013.

While he was separated from his partner, Dedé Santana was hired by the SBT channel to star in the 2005 comedy series "Dedé e o Comando Maluco", which was done in partnership with businessman Beto Carrero. In the series Santana interacted with the comedy group Comando Maluco, derived from the Beto Carrero World park and who previously appeared on the programs Eliana & Alegria and A Praça É Nossa. The show had a good audience to the point of competing with Turma do Didi in the same time slot, however, at the beginning of 2006, the program was changed for the Saturday's afternoons, and after Carrero's death in 2008 the show was cancelled.

In 2017, Globo tried to bet on a revival of Os Trapalhões with a cast of new actors serving as equivalents for Didi, Dedé, Mussum and Zacarias, serving as their successors, while Aragão and Santana appeared as their respective characters, in celebration of the 40th anniversary of the original show, but it was canceled the same year after 10 episodes due to poor public reception.
