= Cultural Union for the Friendship of the People =

Brazilian nonprofit entity

The Cultural Union for the Friendship of the Peoples (Portuguese: União Cultural Pela Amizade dos Povos) is a nonprofit entity based in the city of São Paulo, Brazil.

Initially named Brazil–Soviet Union Cultural Union, it was founded on May 10, 1960, by a large number of Brazilian intellectuals, including the writer Sergio Milliet (its first President), doctor Joao Belline Burza, judge Decio de Arruda Campos, lawyer Aldo Lins e Silva, engineer Lucas Nogueira Garcez, writer Caio Prado Junior, writer Helena Silveira, poet Afonso Schimidt, professor Omar Catunda, painter Clovis Graciano, sociologist Florestan Fernandes, among others.

It served as a bridge for the cultural exchange between Brazil and the peoples of the Soviet Union by teaching the Russian language in Brazil and promoting study abroad at Patrice Lumumba University and Moscow University, or encouraging tourism between the two countries.

Following the dissolution of the Soviet Union and to expand the scope of its cultural relations, in a meeting held on 22 February 1997, the name of the entity was altered to Cultural Union for the Friendship of the Peoples.

Nowadays, besides teaching the Russian language, the entity also offers Spanish and Chinese mandarin courses.
