= Mussum =

Brazilian actor and musician (1941–1994)

- Mussum in a photograph published in the newspaper O Globo in June 1979.
- Born: Antônio Carlos Bernardes Gomes; April 7, 1941; Rio de Janeiro, Brazil
- Died: July 29, 1994 (aged 53); São Paulo, Brazil
- Other name: Carlinhos da Mangueira
- Occupations: Actor, musician
- Years active: 1960-1993

Antônio Carlos Bernardes Gomes (April 7, 1941 in Rio de Janeiro – July 29, 1994 in São Paulo), more known as Mussum (Portuguese pronunciation: [muˈsũ]), was a Brazilian comedian, actor, musician, and songwriter, whose career began in the early 1960s when he abandoned his military position to dedicate himself to music. He co-founded the samba group Os Originais do Samba, where his percussion skills, particularly on the reco-reco, earned him widespread recognition and the nicknames "Carlinhos da Mangueira" and "Carlinhos do Reco-Reco." His transition to television led him to become the third permanent member of the legendary comedy troupe Os Trapalhões, working alongside Renato Aragão, Dedé Santana, and Zacarias. Together with Grande Otelo—who gave him his famous stage name—Mussum stood out as one of the few Black comedians on Brazilian television during the 1980s.

Beyond his television fame, Mussum maintained deep ties to the Mangueira community, actively participating in the Estação Primeira de Mangueira samba school as both a performer and director of its ala das baianas. His musical contributions extended to a successful solo career, with two albums featuring his own compositions, and he played a crucial role in popularizing the Brazilian banjo alongside musician Almir Guineto — an innovation that would later define the 1990s pagode movement. Following his death in 1994, Mussum's cultural impact has persisted and evolved, with his image and wit being perpetually revitalized through countless internet memes that continue to introduce his legacy to new generations.

== Biography ==
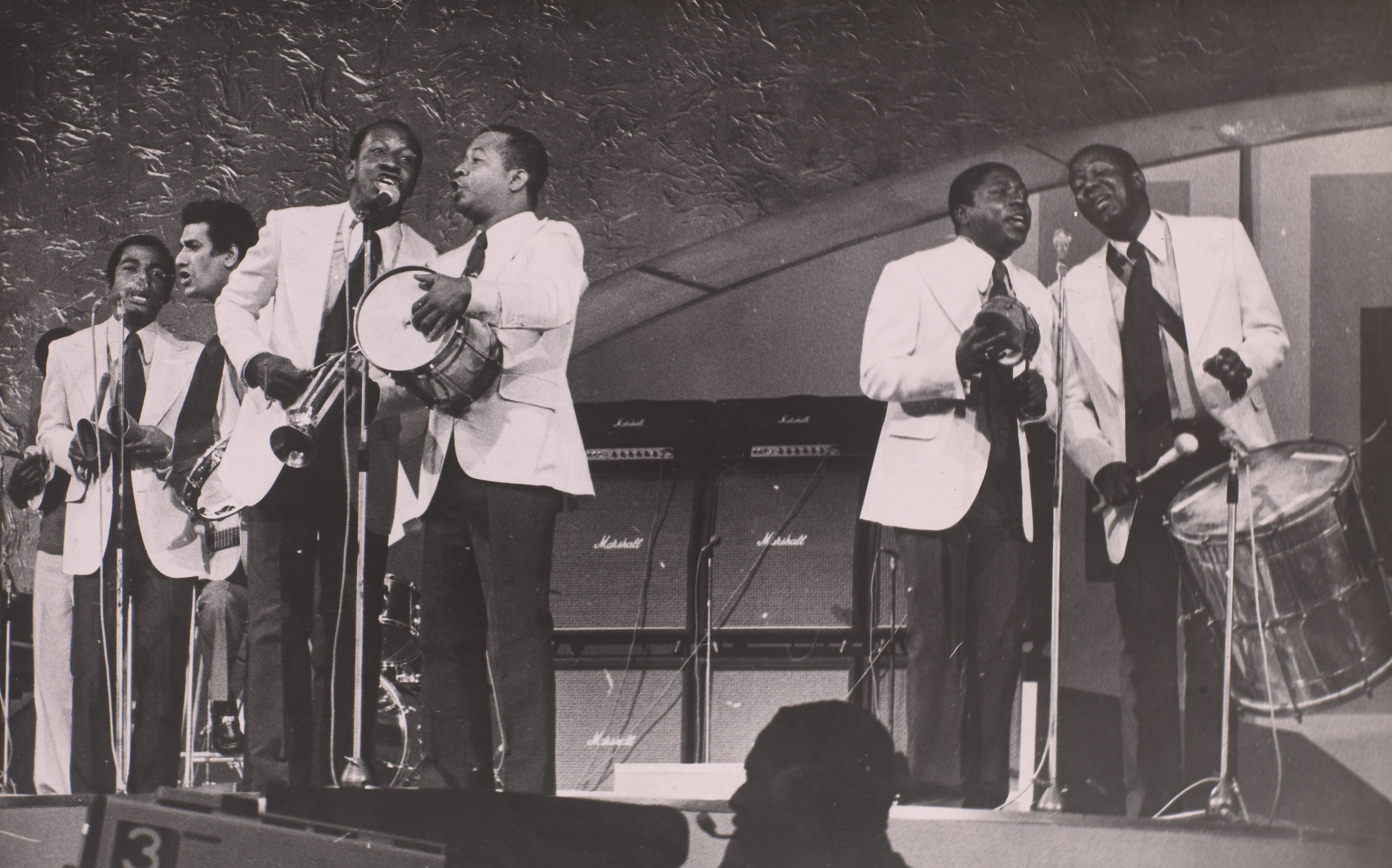
Os Originais do Samba

Born in the Morro da Cachoeirinha neighborhood of Rio de Janeiro's North Zone, Mussum, baptized Antônio Carlos Bernardes Gomes, was raised solely by his mother, Malvina Bernardes Gomes, an illiterate domestic worker who supported the family after her husband's abandonment. Despite dreaming of becoming a soccer player, he prioritized education, completing primary school in 1954 and later graduating as a mechanical fitter from the Instituto Profissional Getúlio Vargas in 1957. His early career included work as a workshop apprentice and eight years of service as a corporal in the Brazilian Air Force, during which he discreetly began his musical journey.

While serving in the Air Force, Mussum joined Carlos Machado's Cultural Caravan and, with friends, founded the group Os Sete Modernos, later renamed Os Originais do Samba. As a percussionist and reco-reco player, he adopted the nicknames "Carlinhos da Mangueira" and "Carlinhos do Reco-Reco," recording 13 albums and achieving hits like "Tragédia no Fundo do Mar." His inventiveness led him to create a metal reco-reco and, alongside Almir Guineto, adapt the American banjo into the "Brazilian banjo," which would become iconic in 1990s pagode music. The group toured internationally, acclaimed in Mexico as "Los Siete Diablos de la Batucada."

His natural charisma caught the attention of television producers, and in 1965 he accepted an invitation to perform alongside Grande Otelo on the program Bairro Feliz, where he received his definitive nickname, "Mussum." After appearances on shows like Chico Anysio's Escolinha do Professor Raimundo, he was introduced to Dedé Santana and Renato Aragão, joining in 1973 the quartet that would become legendary: Os Trapalhões. His unique comedic style quickly emerged, characterized by his trademark linguistic innovation of adding "is" endings to words—creating expressions like "tranquilis" and "coraçãozis" that would become his signature. Moreover, his character was primarily defined by the constant consumption of alcoholic beverages, particularly cachaça. Despite his success, Mussum faced scripted jokes with racist undertones, frequently being called "cromado" (chromed) or "fumaça" (smoke) by his colleagues. According to his biographer Juliano Barreto, he did not remain silent in these situations, responding with sharp improvisations and publicly defending his Black identity. Outside the studio, he was an icon of the samba school Estação Primeira de Mangueira—where he served as harmony director of the "ala das baianas"—and an avid Flamengo fan.

Even during the peak of his work with Os Trapalhões, Mussum maintained a solo music career, releasing albums such as Água Benta (1978) and Mussum (1980).

In July 1994, Mussum was hospitalized in Rio de Janeiro with severe heart failure caused by dilated cardiomyopathy. He underwent a heart transplant in São Paulo using an organ donated by a young accident victim. Although the procedure was initially successful, Mussum developed sepsis and died on July 29, 1994, at age 53. He was buried in São Paulo, and his beloved samba school Mangueira declared official mourning, remembering his dedication to teaching music to local children during his free time.

== Legacy ==
Mussum's legacy remains alive among his fans to this day, particularly in Rio de Janeiro, where he was honored through a series of t-shirts featuring his stylized image and the phrase Mussum Forévis ("forévis" is how Mussum would say "forever"). In 2014, the biography Mussum Forévis – Samba, Mé e Trapalhões, written by journalist Juliano Barreto, was published by Leya Publishing. The documentary Mussum, um Filme do Cacildis, directed by Susanna Lira, followed in 2019. In 2023, the biopic Mussum, o Filmis was released, a production by Globo Filmes, Camisa Listrada, and Downtown Filmes, chronicling Antônio Carlos's journey from childhood to fame through music and Os Trapalhões. Ailton Graça portrays Mussum in this biopic.

In 2013, Mussum's son, Sandro Gomes, co-founder of the Brassaria Ampolis microbrewery, launched Biritis, a Vienna Lager-style beer, as a tribute to his father. Due to its success, a second label named Cacildis (Premium Lager) was introduced the following year. Later, additional labels such as Ditriguis (Witbier) and Forévis (Session IPA) were launched. The brand's popularity grew so significantly that Ampolis was acquired by Grupo Petrópolis in 2018, facilitating nationwide distribution and cementing the beer's status across Brazil.

== Television ==
- Bairro Feliz (TV Globo, 1965)
- Os Trapalhões (TV Excelsior, 1969)
- Os Trapalhões (TV Tupi, 1974—1976)
- Os Trapalhões (TV Globo, 1977—1993)
- Criança Esperança (TV Globo, 1986–1993)

== Filmography ==
=== with Os Trapalhões ===
- 1976: Trapalhão no Planalto dos Macacos as Guarda Azevedo
- 1976: O Trapalhão nas Minas do Rei Salomão as Fumaça
- 1978: Os Trapalhões na Guerra dos Planetas as Mussum
- 1979: Rei e os Trapalhões as Abol
- 1979: O Cinderelo Trapalhão as Mussum
- 1980: Os Três Mosqueteiros Trapalhões as Mussum
- 1980: O Incrível Monstro Trapalhão
- 1981: Os Saltimbancos Trapalhões as Mussum
- 1981: O Mundo Mágico dos Trapalhões
- 1982: Os Vagabundos Trapalhões
- 1983: Os Trapalhões na Serra Pelada as Mexelete
- 1983: O Cangaceiro Trapalhão
- 1983: Atrapalhando a Suate
- 1984: Os Trapalhões e o Mágico de Oróz as Tin Can Man
- 1984: A Filha dos Trapalhões as Mussum
- 1985: Os Trapalhões no Reino da Fantasia as Mussum
- 1986: Os Trapalhões no Rabo do Cometa
- 1986: Os Trapalhões e o Rei do Futebol as Fumê
- 1987: Os Trapalhões no Auto da Compadecida as Mussum
- 1987: Os Fantasmas Trapalhões as Mussum
- 1988: Os Heróis Trapalhões - Uma Aventura na Selva as Mussum
- 1988: O Casamento dos Trapalhões
- 1989: A Princesa Xuxa e os Trapalhões as Mussaim
- 1989: Os Trapalhões na Terra dos Monstros as Mussum
- 1990: Uma Escola Atrapalhada as Mumu, o Mago
- 1990: O Mistério de Robin Hood as Tonho
- 1991: Os Trapalhões e a Árvore da Juventude as Mussum (final film role)
