= Herbert Richers =

Brazilian actor (1923–2009)

- Born: 11 March 1923; Araraquara, Brazil
- Died: 20 November 2009 (aged 86)
- Occupations: Film producer, dubbing producer
- Years active: 1942 – 2009

Herbert Richers (March 11, 1923 – November 20, 2009) was a Brazilian film and dubbing producer. He was a pioneer in the field of voice-overs in Brazil and was responsible for the dubbing of many Hollywood blockbusters into Portuguese, particularly action films such as the Rambo, Rocky, and Lethal Weapon series of films, popular US TV series such as Charlie's Angels, Buffy the Vampire Slayer, CSI: Miami, The Fresh Prince of Bel-Air and Friends and many cartoon series including Popeye and Scooby-Doo. He also produced over 55 Brazilian films between 1956 (Com Água na Boca) and 1975 and was also active with telenovelas like Rosa salvaje.

== Career ==
Based in Rio de Janeiro since 1942, eight years later he founded Herbert Richers SA, which started in the business of film distribution.

The company was one of the pioneers of dubbing in Brazil. At its peak it was the largest companies in the industry in the country, with an average of 150 hours of dubbed movies per month, representing 70% of the films run in Brazilian theaters. It also has the largest dubbing studios in Latin America occupying more than 10 thousand square meters.

Herbert Richers was a film producer of former productions in the 1950s.

Aware of the Hollywood studios, he was connected to Walt Disney Studios which educated him in dubbing. Bringing the knowledge gained there back to Brazil, he applied it to the movies and TV productions in Brazil. He thus dubbed many Hollywood films and TV series into Portuguese for the Brazilian audience, particularly blockbuster action movies and television series (see below).

While the company was hugely successful, it started to have financial problems due to increased competition from new dubbing studios in the early 2000s. The company closed doors after his death.

== Personal life and death ==
He died on November 20, 2009, from kidney failure. His son, Herbert Richers Jr., is also a noted director in Brazil.

== Selected filmography ==
=== Telenovelas ===
- Alegrifes e Rabujos
- Amigas e Rivais
- Amor a Mil por Hora
- Amor Real
- A Outra
- A Feia Mais Bela
- A Usurpadora
- Café com Aroma de Mulher
- Carinha de Anjo
- Carrossel (telenovela)
- Viva às Crianças! – Carrossel 2
- Chiquititas 2006
- Chiquititas 2007
- Chiquititas 2008
- Código Postal
- Cúmplices de um Resgate
- No Limite da Paixão
- Esmeralda
- Lalola
- Luz Clarita
- Marimar
- María Mercedes
- Maria do Bairro
- O Diário de Daniela
- O Privilégio de Amar
- Pícara Sonhadora
- Os Ricos Também Choram
- Primeiro Amor … A Mil por Hora
- Quase Anjos
- Quinze Anos
- Rebelde
- Rosalinda
- Rosa salvaje

=== Cartoons ===
- Animaniacs
- A Ratinha Valente (original dub)
- As Aventuras de Tintin
- As Peripécias de um Ratinho Detetive
- As Tartarugas Ninja
- Bicrossers
- Capitão Planeta
- Caverna do Dragão
- Centurions
- Chaves em Desenho Animado
- Danny Phantom (also dubbed by Delart)
- Dennis, o Pimentinha
- Digimon, Digimon 02 e Digimon Tamers
- Ducktales
- Em Busca do Vale Encantado
- Fievel: Um Conto Americano
- Galaxy Rangers
- Hamtaro
- He-Man
- Inspetor Bugiganga (redubbed version)
- Johnny Bravo (seasons 2, 3 and 4)
- Larryboy: The Cartoon Adventures
- Nossa Turma
- O Caldeirão Mágico
- O Cão e a Raposa
- O Ônibus Mágico (seasons 1 and 2)
- O Novo Show do Pica-Pau
- Os Caça Fantasmas
- Os Dinossauros Voltaram
- Os Vegetais (TV dub)
- Mirmo Zibang
- Pole Position
- Popeye
- Primo Cruzado
- Pucca
- Rover Dangerfield: Uma Vida de Cachorro
- Scooby-Doo, Cadê Você?, Scooby-Doo e Scooby-Loo, O Pequeno Scooby-Doo
- Shaider
- She-ra
- Silverhawks
- Superamigos
- Tenchi Muyo!
- Thundercats
- Tonde Burin
- Tico e Teco e os Defensores da Lei
- Tom e Jerry: O Filme (TV dub version)
- Um Conto Americano: Fievel Vai Para o Oeste

=== Television series ===
- ALF, o ETeimoso
- A Gata e o Rato
- Agente 86
- As Panteras
- Barrados no Baile
- Buffy a Caça-Vampiros
- Capitão Marvel
- Casal 20
- CSI: Miami
- CSI: NY
- Dallas
- Família Dinossauros
- Friends
- Kenan & Kel
- Lois & Clark: As Novas Aventuras do Superman
- Magnum, P.I.
- Miami Vice
- Monk – Um Detetive Diferente
- Os Gatões
- O Incrível Hulk
- Os Pioneiros
- Os Troopers
- Power Rangers
- Profissão: Perigo
- Três é Demais
- Um Maluco no Pedaço

=== Films ===
- Advogado do Diabo (1997)
- A História Sem Fim
- A Lagoa Azul (1980)
- Alien – O Oitavo Passageiro
- À procura da felicidade
- Bom dia, Vietnã! (1988)
- Brinquedo Assassino (1988)
- Assassinos
- Batman – O Filme
- Alta Tensão
- Clube da Luta
- Coração Valente
- Demetrius e os Gladiadores
- Duro de Matar
- Duro de Matar 2
- Em Nome Do Pai
- E o Vento Levou
- Free Willy
- Free Willy 2: A Aventura Continua
- Falcão: O Campeão dos Campeões
- Grease – Nos Tempos da Brilhantina
- Highlander: O Guerreiro Imortal
- Letra e Música
- Liberdade para as borboletas
- Máquina Mortífera
- Máquina Mortífera 2
- Máquina Mortífera 3
- Máquina Mortífera 4
- Maverick
- Meu Primeiro Amor
- Minority Report: A Nova Lei
- Mortal Kombat
- Morte Súbita
- Moulin Rouge!
- Nova York Sitiada
- O Alvo
- O Código da Vinci
- O Demolidor
- Os Dez Mandamentos
- O Especialista
- O Fugitivo
- O Grande Dragão Branco
- O Pequeno Polegar
- O Poderoso Chefão
- O Quinto Elemento
- O Rapto do Menino Dourado
- O Último Guerreiro das Estrelas
- Perigo na Noite
- O Vingador do Futuro
- Power Rangers: O Filme
- Rambo: Programado para Matar
- Rambo II: A Missão
- Rambo III
- Risco Total
- Rocky V
- Soldado Universal
- Cobra
- Guerra nas Estrelas
- Star Wars Episódio V: O Império Contra-Ataca
- Star Wars Episódio VI: O Retorno de Jedi
- Superman
- Cantando na Chuva
- Titanic
- Turbo: Power Rangers 2
- U.S. Marshals – Os Federais
- Um Tira da Pesada
- Velocidade Máxima
- Velocidade Máxima 2
- Os Goonies

=== Television specials ===
- A Rena do Nariz Vermelho (1979 dub)
