= Carequinha =

Brazilian clown and actor (1915–2006)

- Born: George Savalla Gomes; July 18, 1915; Rio Bonito, Rio de Janeiro, Brazil
- Died: April 5, 2006 (aged 90); São Gonçalo, Rio de Janeiro, Brazil
- Other names: Baldy the Clown
- Occupations: Clown, actor

George Savalla Gomes, better known as Carequinha or Baldy the Clown (July 18, 1915 in Rio Bonito – April 5, 2006 in São Gonçalo), was a Brazilian clown and actor, born in a circus to a circus family. He had a thick head of hair, but wore a bald wig, starting from five years old – he was a clown in Circus Ocidental until the age of twelve. He was the first Brazilian clown to have his own TV show – Circo Bombril, later called Circo Carequinha ran for 16 years. He was a Freemason.

== Filmography ==
Year	Title	Role	Notes
1956	Sai de Baixo		
1956	Com Água na Boca		
1957	Com Jeito Vai	Himself	
1957	Sherlock de Araque	Sertório	
1958	É de Chuá		
1960	Vem a Alegria	Himself	
1960	O Palhaço O Que É?		
1981	As Três Marias		Telenovela
1990	Escolinha do Professor Raimundo	Himself	TV show
2005	Hoje É Dia de Maria 2	Tocador de Realejo	TV miniseries, (final appearance)
