= Beto Carrero =

Brazilian entertainer and businessman (1937–2008)

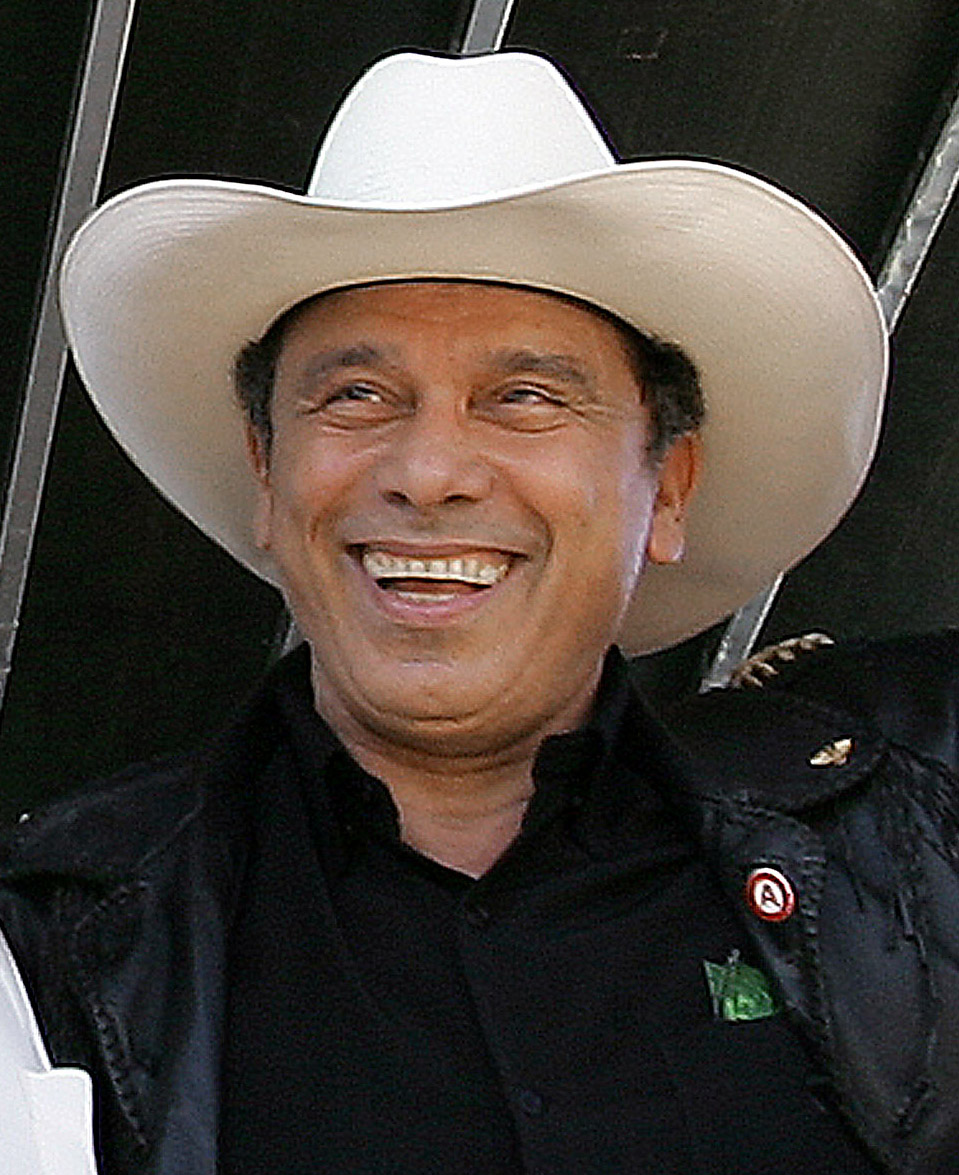
- Born: João Batista Sergio Murad; 9 September 1937; São José do Rio Preto, São Paulo, Brazil
- Died: 1 February 2008 (aged 70); São Paulo, Brazil
- Occupations: Theme park owner; businessman; entertainer

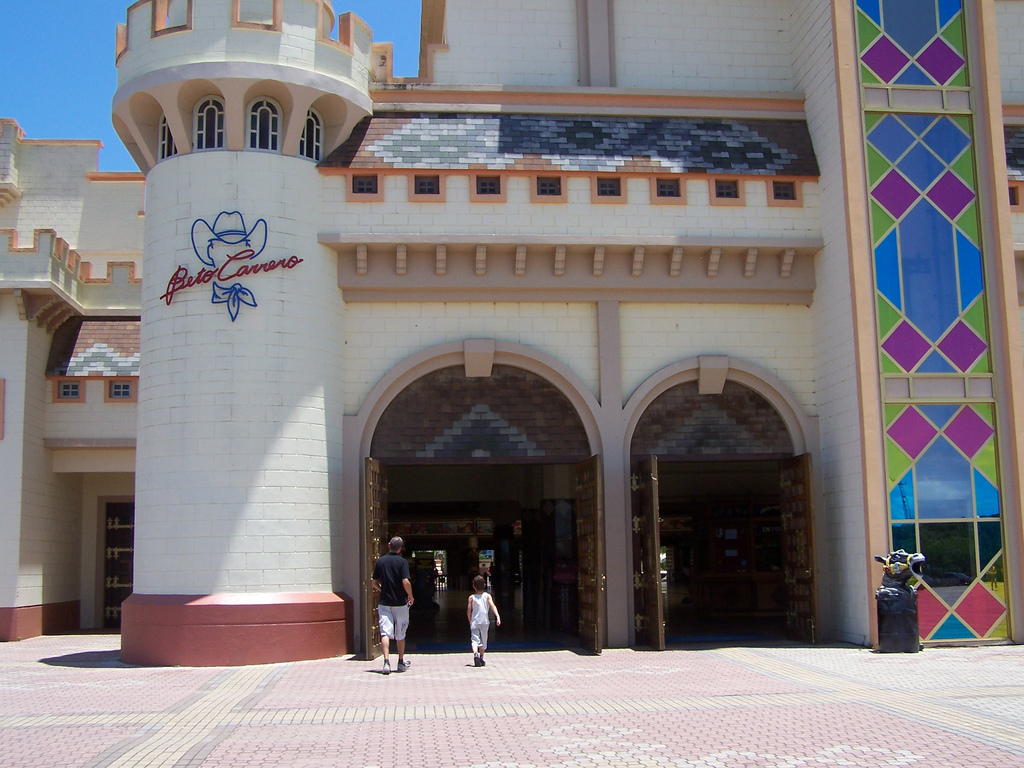
Entrance to the Beto Carrero World

Beto Carrero (born João Batista Sergio Murad; 9 September 1937 – 1 February 2008) was a Brazilian theme park owner and entertainer. He was the creator of the Beto Carrero World Park, in the municipality of Penha, on the northern coast of the Brazilian state of Santa Catarina, which is one of the largest in Latin America.

== Biography ==
Carrero was born into a poor family in São José do Rio Preto, a town in upstate São Paulo, on 9 September 1937. His father was a Lebanese immigrant who worked on a farm, and his mother was from Minas Gerais.

He worked as a sertanejo musician, radio announcer and ad salesman before starting an advertising agency and, later, a theme park.

He owned what has been called the largest theme park in Latin America, Beto Carrero World in Penha, which he owned from its opening in 1991 until his death. He also appeared in several acting roles under his stage persona, a vaqueiro.

In June 2008, journalist Alex Solnik released a biography of Beto Carrero. It was titled Domador de Sonhos – A Vida Mágica de Beto Carrero (which means, in Portuguese, Tamer of Dreams – The Magical Life of Beto Carrero).

== Comics ==
In 1985, the As Aventuras de Beto Carrero comic book was published by Cluq Editorial, written by Gedeone Malagola and with art by Eugenio Colonnese. Although based on Bandeiras and Sertanejo periods, started in at the end of the 17th century. In the comics Beto did not use firearms, but instead his whip, to fight crime.

In November 2006, JB World Entertainment SA, Carrero's illustration and animation studio, launched the comic book The Adventures of Betinho Carrero. The title is about a young fan of Beto Carrero who dresses like him.

== Death ==
On 30 January 2008, Carrero was admitted to the Hospital Sírio-Libanês, in São Paulo, with a cardiac problem and died around two days later at 0:05 BRST. The official cause of death was endocarditis. He is survived by three sons.

== Filmography ==
- Os Trapalhões no Reino da Fantasia (1985)
- O Mistério de Robin Hood (1990)
- A História de Ana Raio e Zé Trovão (1990, TV series)
