= Roberto Guilherme =

Brazilian actor and comedian (1938–2022)

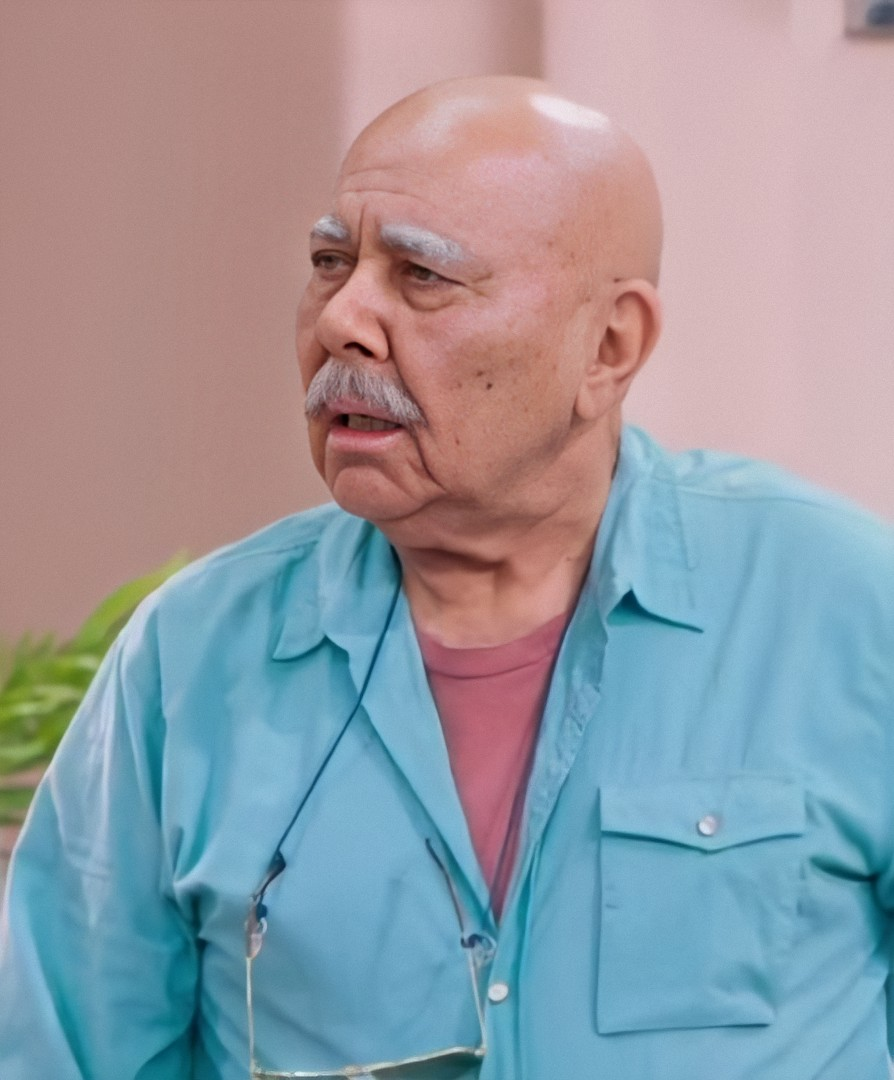
- Guilherme in 2020
- Born: Edward Guilherme Nunes da Silva; 25 May 1938; Corumbá, Mato Grosso, Brazil
- Died: 9 November 2022 (aged 84); Rio de Janeiro, Brazil
- Occupation(s): Actor, voice actor and comedian

Roberto Guilherme (born Edward Guilherme Nunes da Silva; 25 May 1938 – 10 November 2022) was a Brazilian actor and comedian.

== Life and career ==
Born in Corumbá, Guilherme spent his childhood between Natal and Rio de Janeiro. During his youth he played football with Vasco da Gama and, while in the army, with the Brazilian Military Soccer National Team.

Guilherme made his debut as an actor and a playwright with an amateur dramatics society in north Rio, where he was noted by a TV Rio producer, who immediately put him under contract for his channel. He later worked for TV Excelsior, where he met the comedian Renato Aragão, of whom he became the sidekick in a number of projects, notably playing Sargento Pincel in Os Trapalhões. He later worked for TV Record and Rede Tupi, where he met the comedian José Santa Cruz, with whom he formed the duo Jojoca e Xexéu. His last appearances were in 2018 in two Multishow variety shows, Treme Treme and Dra. Darci.

== Death ==
Guilherme died of cancer on 10 November 2022, at the age of 84.
