= Carlos Manga =

Brazilian film director

- Born: 6 January 1928; Rio de Janeiro, Brazil
- Died: 17 September 2015 (aged 87); Rio de Janeiro, Brazil
- Occupations: Director; Screenwriter
- Years active: 1952-2007

Carlos Manga (6 January 1928 – 17 September 2015) was a Brazilian film director. He directed 25 films between 1952, and 1986.

== Selected filmography ==
- The Terrible Twosome (1953)
- Os Trapalhões e o Rei do Futebol (1986)
- Sítio do Picapau Amarelo (2006)
