= Dedé Santana =

Brazilian comedian (born 1936)

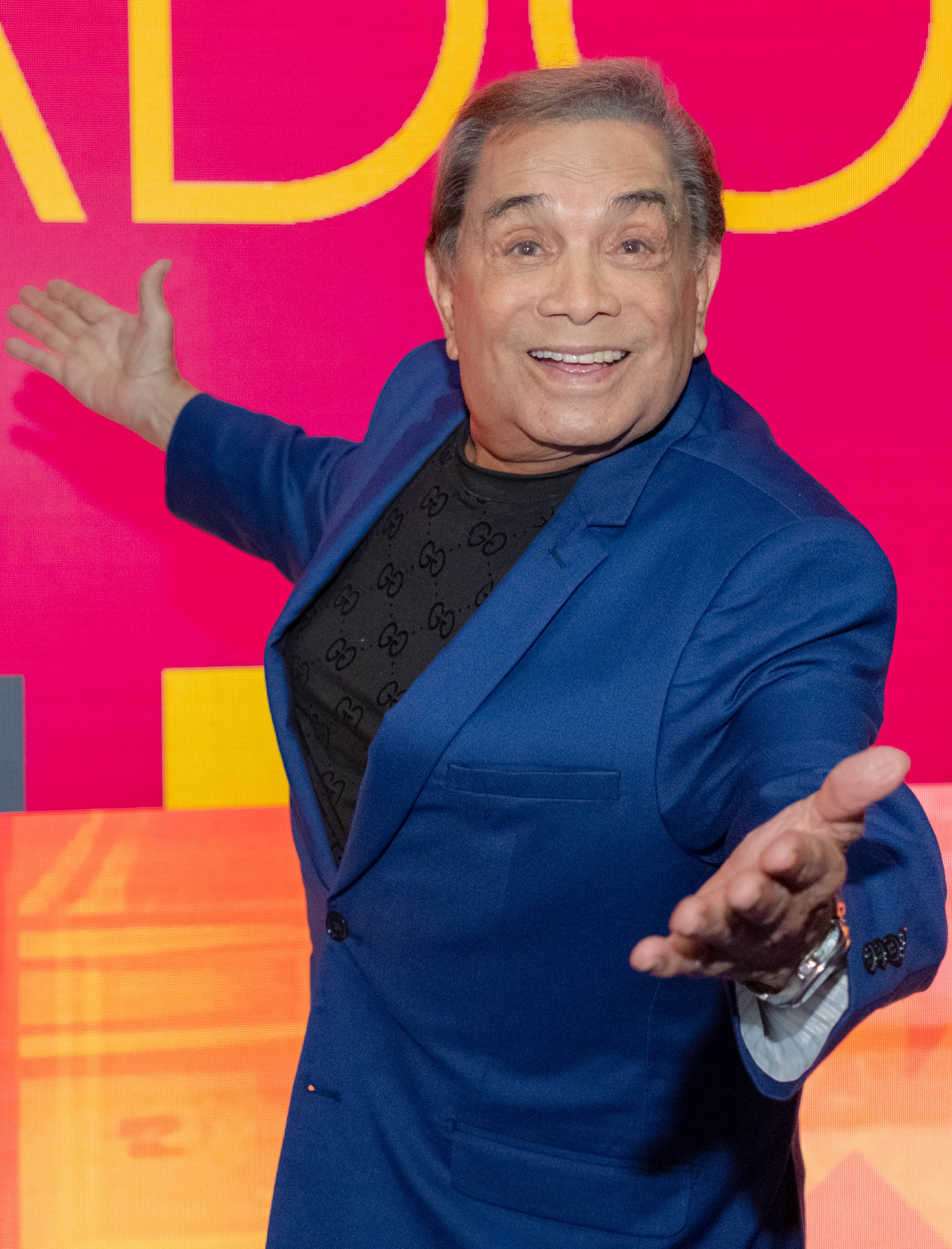
- Dedé in 2024.
- Born: Manfried Sant'Anna; April 29, 1936 (age 89); Niterói, Rio de Janeiro
- Occupation(s): Actor, comedian, presenter, director and screenwriter
- Spouse: Ana Rosa (1958–1962)
- Children: 8

Manfried Sant'Anna (Niterói, April 29, 1936), known artistically as Dedé Santana (Portuguese pronunciation: [deˈdɛ sɐ̃ˈtɐ̃nɐ]), is a Brazilian comedian, best known for his role in the television series Os Trapalhões, where he was one of the four protagonists.

== Short bio ==
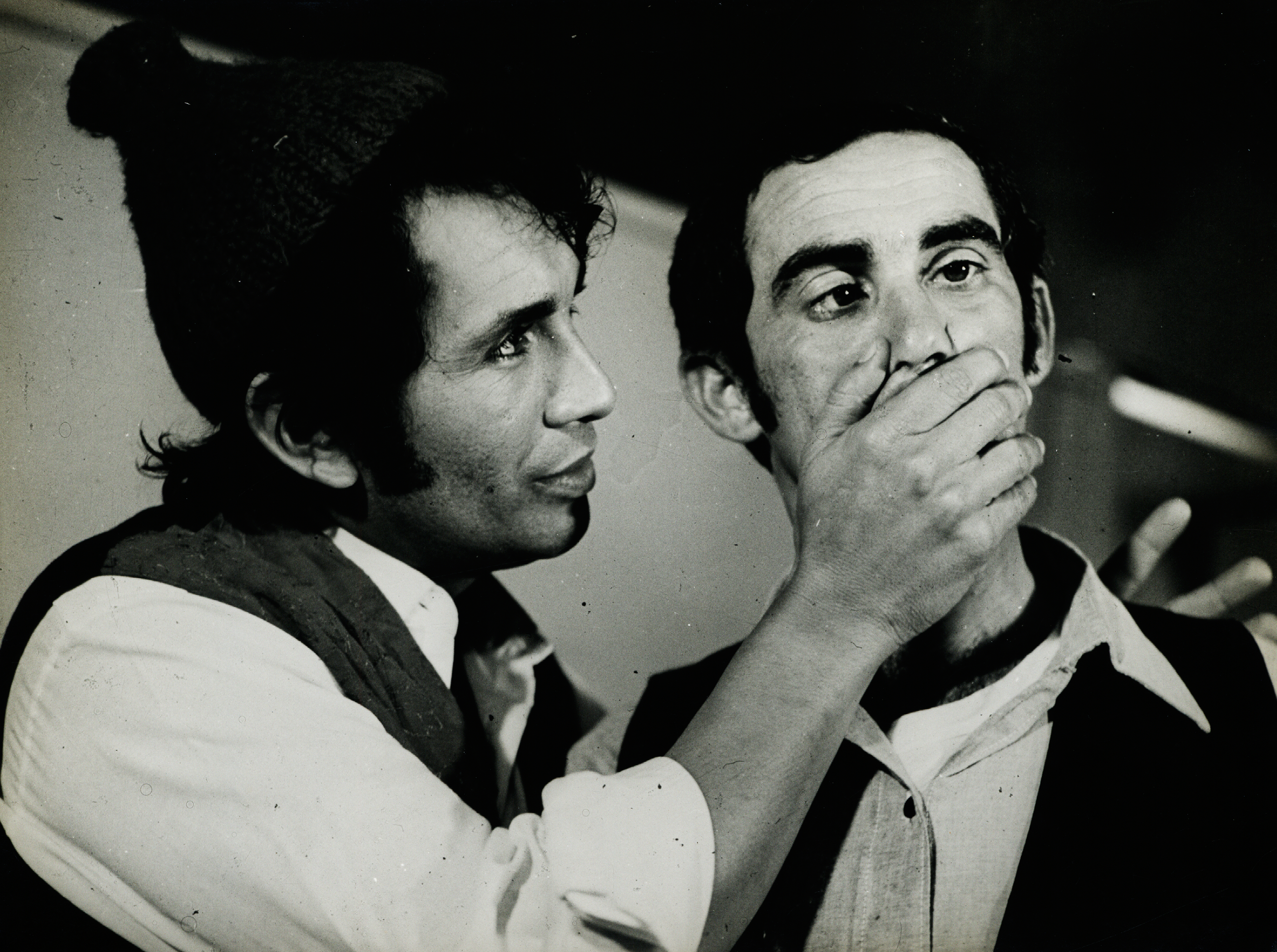
Renato Aragão and Dedé Santana in the scene in the movie “Ali Babá e os quarenta ladrões” in 1972.

Dedé was raised among circus performers in a Roma family. He and his brother Dino Santana (deceased in 2010) acted in television as a comedic couple named Maloca e Bonitão in 1965.

Later, Dedé joined the comedian Renato Aragão and created another comedian duo that later with the addition of Mussum and Zacarias, would become the famous Brazilian quartet Os Trapalhões, which with its TV series (aired by Rede Globo) and movies, gained national fame in the 1970s, 1980s and early 1990s. His brother Dino Santana acted in Trapalhões's movies and series as a supporting actor. After Zacarias and Mussum deaths (respectively in 1990 and 1994), the famous group came to an end.

Dedé then had little participations on television, like in the Chico Anysio's Escolinha do Professor Raimundo (Portuguese for Teacher Raimundo's Little School) and acted was a teacher in the TV series Escolinha do Barulho (Portuguese for Noisy little School, aired by Rede Record), in the late 1990s.

He returned to TV, along with his brother, in 2005, in the TV series Dedé e o Comando Maluco (Portuguese for Dedé and the Mad Commando, aired by SBT), in association with manager Beto Carrero. After Carrero's death, in 2008, Dedé returned to Rede Globo and again joined his old friend Renato Aragão in the TV series A Turma do Didi (Portuguese for Didi's Gang, and later named Aventuras do Didi, Portuguese for Didi's Adventures).

== Television ==
- A E I O URCA (TV Tupi, 1964–1965)
- Os Legionários (TV Excelsior, 1965–1966)
- Adoráveis Trapalhões (TV Excelsior, 1965–1966)
- Quartel do Barulho (TV Record, 1966–1969)
- Os Insociáveis (TV Record, 1972–1974)
- Os Trapalhões (TV Tupi, 1974–1976)
- Os Trapalhões (TV Globo, 1977–1996)
- Criança Esperança (TV Globo, 1986–1996, 2004, 2008, 2009 and 2010—)
- Os Trapalhões – Melhores Momentos de Todos os Tempos (reruns, TV Globo, 1994–1999)
- Escolinha do Professor Raimundo (TV Globo, 1995)
- Os Trapalhões em Portugal (TV SIC, Portugal, 1994–1997)
- Escolinha do Barulho (TV Record, 1999–2001)
- Dedé e o Comando Maluco (SBT, 2005–2008)
- A Turma do Didi (TV Globo, 2008, 2009–2010 —).
- Aventuras do Didi (TV Globo, 2010)

== Discography ==
- 1996 – Trapalhões e Seus Amigos
- 1995 – Os Trapalhões em Portugal
- 1991 – Amigos do Peito – 25 Anos de Trapalhões
- 1988 – Os Trapalhões
- 1987 – Os Trapalhões
- 1985 – A Filha dos Trapalhões
- 1984 – Os Trapalhões
- 1984 – Os Trapalhões e o Mágico de Oroz
- 1984 – O Trapalhão na Arca de Noé
- 1983 – O Cangaceiro Trapalhão
- 1982 – Os Trapalhões na Serra Pelada
- 1982 – Os Vagabundos Trapalhões
- 1981 – Os Saltimbancos Trapalhões
- 1981 – O Forró dos Trapalhões
- 1979 – Os Trapalhões na TV
- 1975 – Os Trapalhões – Volume 2
- 1974 – Os Trapalhões – Volume 1

== Filmography ==
=== Solo ===
- 1986 – As Sete Vampiras
- 1973 – Sob o Domínio do Sexo
- 1972 – Os Desempregados
- 1970 – Se Meu Dólar Falasse
- 1969 – Deu a Louca no Cangaço
- 1969 – 2000 Anos de Confusão
- 1967 – A Espiã Que Entrou em Fria
- 1964 – Lana, Queen of the Amazons
- 1962 – Rio à Noite

=== With Renato Aragão ===
- 1999 – O Trapalhão e a Luz Azul
- 1998 – Simão, o Fantasma Trapalhão
- 1997 – O Noviço Rebelde
- 1971 – Bonga, O Vagabundo
- 1965 – Na onda do Iê-Iê-Iê

=== With Mussum and Zacarias ===
- 1983 – Atrapalhando a Suate

=== with Os Trapalhões ===
- 1991 – Os Trapalhões E A Árvore da Juventude
- 1990 – O Mistério de Robin Hood
- 1990 – Uma Escola Atrapalhada
- 1989 – Os Trapalhões na Terra dos Monstros
- 1989 – A Princesa Xuxa e os Trapalhões
- 1988 – O Casamento dos Trapalhões
- 1988 – Os Heróis Trapalhões - Uma Aventura na Selva
- 1987 – Os Trapalhões no Auto da Compadecida
- 1987 – Os Fantasmas Trapalhões
- 1986 – Os Trapalhões e o Rei do Futebol
- 1986 – Os Trapalhões no Rabo do Cometa
- 1985 – Os Trapalhões no Reino da Fantasia
- 1984 – A Filha dos Trapalhões
- 1984 – Os Trapalhões e o Mágico de Oróz
- 1983 – O Cangaceiro Trapalhão
- 1982 – Os Vagabundos Trapalhões
- 1982 – Os Trapalhões na Serra Pelada
- 1981 – Os Saltimbancos Trapalhões
- 1980 – O Incrível Monstro Trapalhão
- 1980 – Os Três Mosqueteiros Trapalhões
- 1979 – O Rei e os Trapalhões
- 1979 – O Cinderelo Trapalhão
- 1978 – Os Trapalhões na Guerra dos Planetas
- 1977 – O Trapalhão nas Minas do Rei Salomão
- 1977 – Simbad, O Marujo Trapalhão
- 1976 – O Trapalhão no Planalto dos Macacos
- 1975 – O Trapalhão na Ilha do Tesouro
- 1974 – Robin Hood, O Trapalhão da Floresta
- 1973 – Aladim e a Lâmpada Maravilhosa
- 1972 – Ali Babá e os Quarenta Ladrões
- 1966 – Na Onda do Iê-Iê-Iê
- 1966 – A Ilha dos Paqueras
