= Zacarias (Os Trapalhões) =

Brazilian actor (1934–1990)

Zacarias Gonçalves
- Born: Mauro Faccio Gonçalves; January 18, 1934; Sete Lagoas, Brazil
- Died: March 18, 1990 (aged 56); Rio de Janeiro, Brazil
- Other name: Zacaria
- Occupations: Actor; comedian; singer; voice actor; announcer; theatre director
- Years active: 1955-1989
- Spouse: Selma Lopes (m. 1958; div. 1973)
- Children: Maria Laura Gonçalves

Mauro Faccio Gonçalves (January 18, 1934 — March 18, 1990), known artistically as Zacarias Gonçalves or simply Zacarias (Portuguese pronunciation: [zakaˈɾiɐs]), was a Brazilian actor, notable for being a member of the comedic group Os Trapalhões. He was born in Sete Lagoas.

== Cause of death ==
In December 1989, Zacarias started taking weight loss medicines without medical supervision. He quickly lost at least 19 kilograms (42 lb), but this affected his health, and he succumbed to a lung infection. At the time, the sudden weight loss led to widespread rumors (including a headline in tabloid Notícias Populares) that he had died of AIDS. However, his family maintains to this day that this was not the case. In 2022, Brazilian director and journalist Rafael Spaca released a movie called Trapalhadas sem Fim (lit. Endless Messes), and resurfaced the claims that Zacarias had died of AIDS, unearthing evidences in the form of his death certificate, which listed some complications that led to his death, some common to HIV patients, with one of them scribbled over beyond recognition) and testimonies from people who surrounded the artist's life and work. He died in Rio de Janeiro.

== Television ==
- Tribunal de Calouros (TV Itacolomi, 1963)
- Café Sem Concerto (TV Tupi)
- Os Trapalhões (TV Tupi, 1974–1977)
- Os Trapalhões (TV Globo, 1977–1990)
- Criança Esperança (TV Globo, 1986–1989)

== Discography ==
- 1975: Os Trapalhões – Volume 2
- 1979: Os Trapalhões na TV
- 1981: O Forró dos Trapalhões
- 1981: Os Saltimbancos Trapalhões
- 1982: Os Vagabundos Trapalhões
- 1982: Os Trapalhões na Serra Pelada
- 1983: O Cangaceiro Trapalhão
- 1984: O Trapalhão na Arca de Noé
- 1984: Os Trapalhões e o Mágico de Oroz
- 1984: Os Trapalhões
- 1985: A Filha dos Trapalhões
- 1987: Os Trapalhões
- 1988: Os Trapalhões

== Filmography ==
=== Solo ===
- 1971: Tô na Tua, Ô Bicho
- 1975: O Fraco do Sexo Forte
- 1977: Deu a Louca nas Mulheres

=== with Mussum and Dedé Santana ===
- 1983: Atrapalhando a Suate

=== with Os Trapalhões ===
- 1978: Os Trapalhões na Guerra dos Planetas as himself
- 1979: O Rei e os Trapalhões as Abil
- 1979: O Cinderelo Trapalhão as himself
- 1980: Os Três Mosqueteiros Trapalhões as himself
- 1980: O Incrível Monstro Trapalhão
- 1981: Os Saltimbancos Trapalhões
- 1982: Os Vagabundos Trapalhões
- 1982: Os Trapalhões na Serra Pelada as himself
- 1983: O Cangaceiro Trapalhão
- 1984: Os Trapalhões e o Mágico de Oróz as Scarecrow
- 1984: A Filha dos Trapalhões as himself
- 1985: Os Trapalhões no Reino da Fantasia as himself
- 1986: Os Trapalhões no Rabo do Cometa
- 1986: Os Trapalhões e o Rei do Futebol as himself
- 1987: Os Trapalhões no Auto da Compadecida
- 1987: Os Fantasmas Trapalhões as himself
- 1988: Os Heróis Trapalhões - Uma Aventura na Selva as himself
- 1988: O Casamento dos Trapalhões
- 1989: A Princesa Xuxa e os Trapalhões as Zacaling
- 1989: Os Trapalhões na Terra dos Monstros as himself (final film role)
