= Renato Aragão =

Brazilian comedian and filmmaker

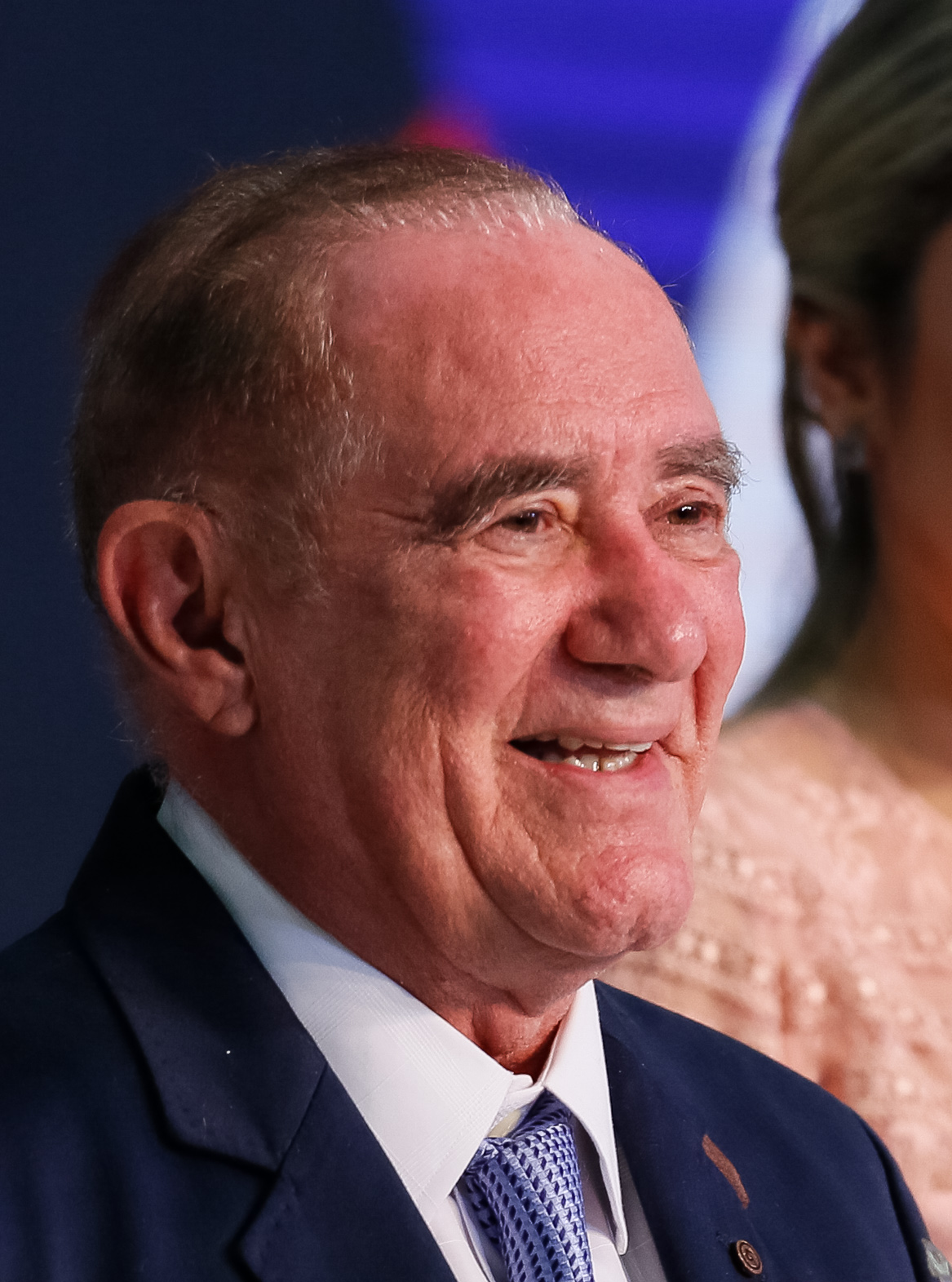
- Aragão, 2017
- Born: Antônio Renato Aragão; January 13, 1935 (age 91); Sobral, Ceará, Brazil
- Other name: Didi Mocó
- Notable work: Os Trapalhões, A Turma do Didi (later named Aventuras do Didi)

Comedy career
- Years active: 1960–present
- Medium: Film, television, comedy
- Genres: Slapstick comedy, musical comedy

Antônio Renato Aragão (born January 13, 1935), nicknamed Didi, is a Brazilian comedian actor, producer, filmmaker, TV presenter, singer, writer and lawyer. He is best known as Didi, because of his leading role in the television series Os Trapalhões.

Didi was born in Sobral, Ceará. He obtained a degree in law in 1961, but has never worked as a lawyer. For many years he was the host of the TV programme Criança Esperança on Globo TV.

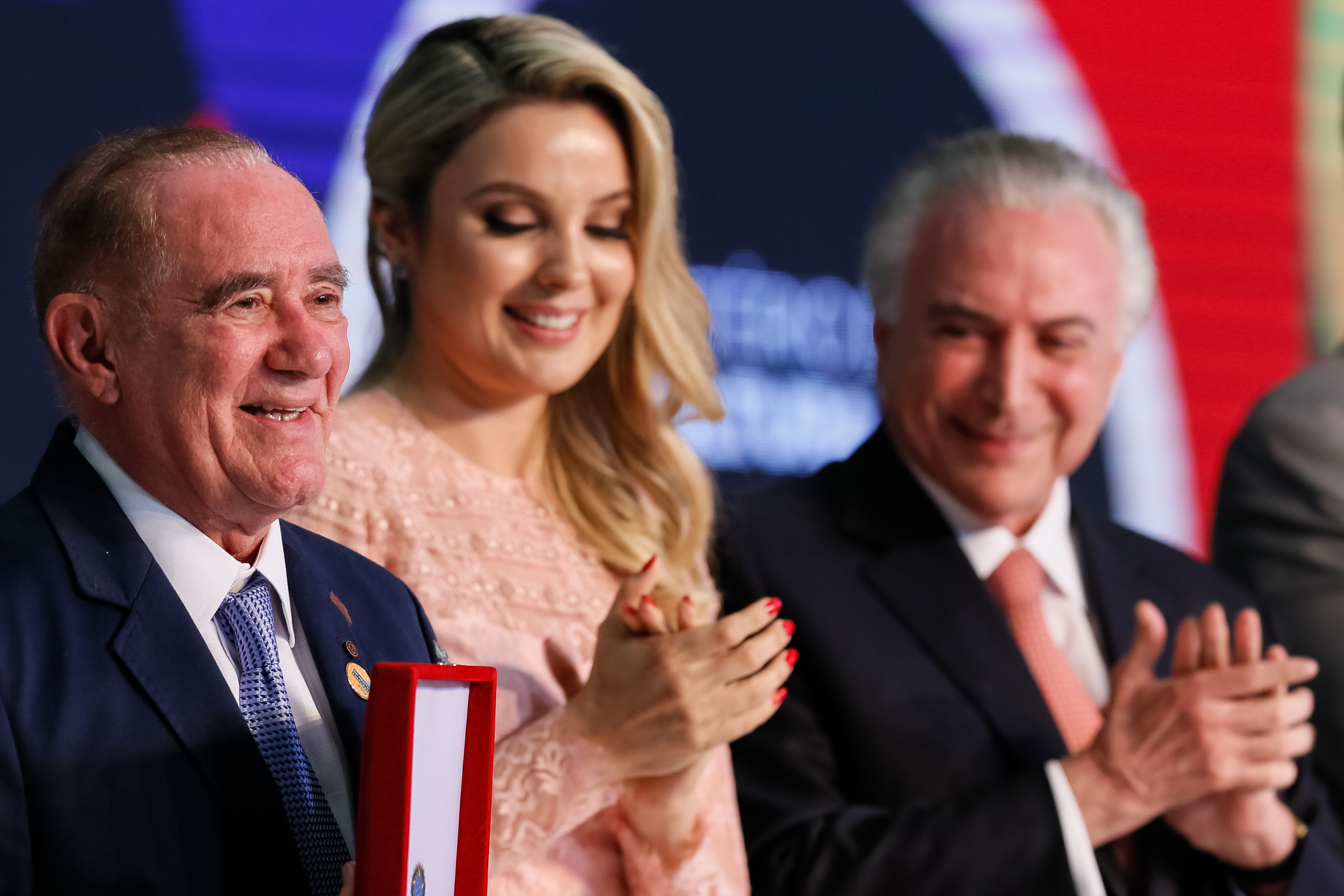
Renato Aragão receiving the Order of Cultural Merit from Brazilian President Michel Temer (2017).

== Filmography ==
=== Television series ===
- Vídeo Alegre (TV Ceará, 1961–1963)
- A E I O URCA (TV Tupi, 1964–1965)
- Os Legionários (TV Excelsior, 1965–1966)
- A Cidade Se Diverte (TV Excelsior, 1965–1966)
- Adoráveis Trapalhões (TV Excelsior, 1965–1966)
- Uma Graça, Mora? (TV Record, 1966–1969)
- Praça da Alegria (TV Record, 1966–1969)
- Quartel do Barulho (TV Record, 1966–1969)
- Café sem Concerto (TV Tupi, 1970–1971)
- Os Insociáveis (TV Record, 1972–1974)
- Os Trapalhões (TV Tupi, 1974–1976)
- Os Trapalhões (TV Globo, 1976–1993)
- Criança Esperança (TV Globo, 1986–2012)
- Os Trapalhões – Melhores Momentos de Todos os Tempos (reruns, TV Globo, 1994–1997)
- Os Trapalhões em Portugal (TV SIC, Portugal, 1994–1997)
- A Turma do Didi (TV Globo, 1998–2010–).
- Aventuras do Didi (TV Globo, 2010–2013)

=== Cinema ===
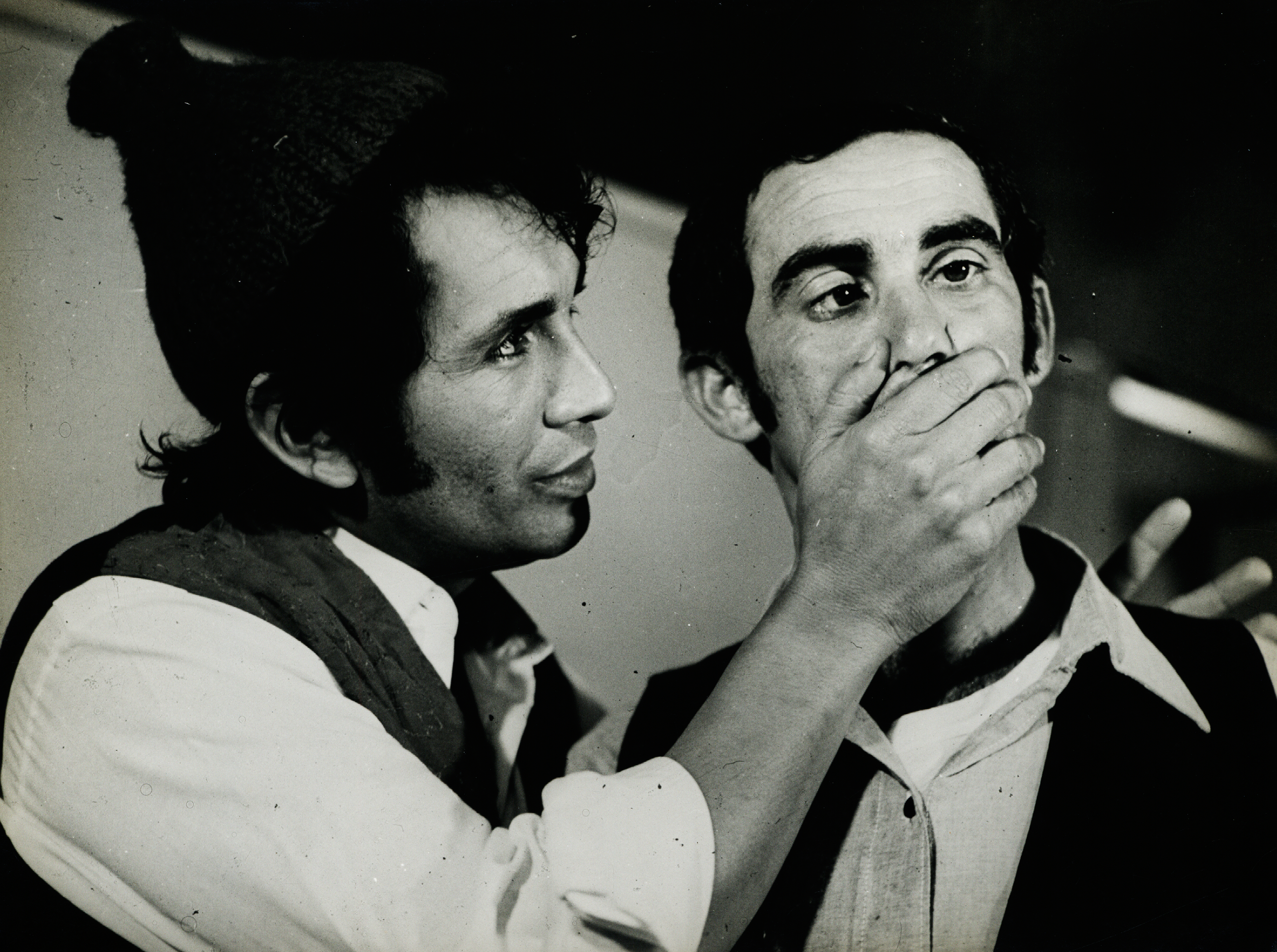
Renato Aragão and Dedé Santana in the scene in the movie “Ali Babá e os quarenta ladrões” in 1972.

== Discography ==
- 1974 – Os Trapalhões – Volume 1
- 1975 – Os Trapalhões – Volume 2
- 1979 – Os Trapalhões na TV
- 1981 – O Forró dos Trapalhões
- 1981 – Os Saltimbancos Trapalhões
- 1982 – Os Vagabundos Trapalhões
- 1982 – Os Trapalhões na Serra Pelada
- 1983 – O Cangaceiro Trapalhão
- 1984 – O Trapalhão na Arca de Noé
- 1984 – Os Trapalhões e o Mágico de Oroz
- 1984 – Os Trapalhões
- 1985 – A Filha dos Trapalhões
- 1987 – Os Trapalhões
- 1988 – Os Trapalhões
- 1991 – Amigos do Peito – 25 Anos de Trapalhões
- 1995 – Os Trapalhões em Portugal
- 1996 – Trapalhões e Seus Amigos
- 2000 – Didi & Sua Turma

== Filmography ==
=== Solo ===
- 1966 – Adorável Trapalhão
- 1968 – Dois Na Lona
- 1983 – O Trapalhão na Arca de Noé
- 2000 – O Anjo Trapalhão
- 2003 – Didi, o Cupido Trapalhão
- 2004 – Didi Quer ser Criança
- 2005 – Didi, O Caçador de Tesouros
- 2006 – O Cavaleiro Didi e a Princesa Lili
- 2007 – Didi e a Pequena Ninja
- 2009 - Uma Noite no Castelo - TV movie
- 2010 - A Princesa e o Vagabundo - TV movie
- 2014 - Didi e o Segredo dos Anjos - TV movie
- 2017 - Os Saltimbancos Trapalhões: Rumo a Hollywood

=== with Dedé Santana ===
- 1971 – Bonga, O Vagabundo
- 1997 – O Noviço Rebelde
- 1998 – Simão, o Fantasma Trapalhão
- 1999 – O Trapalhão e a Luz Azul

=== with Os Trapalhões ===
- 1966 – A Ilha dos Paqueras
- 1966 – Na Onda do Iê-Iê-Iê
- 1972 – Ali Babá e os Quarenta Ladrões
- 1973 – Aladim e a Lâmpada Maravilhosa
- 1974 – Robin Hood, O Trapalhão da Floresta
- 1975 – O Trapalhão na Ilha do Tesouro
- 1976 – O Trapalhão no Planalto dos Macacos
- 1977 – Simbad, O Marujo Trapalhão
- 1977 – O Trapalhão nas Minas do Rei Salomão
- 1978 – Os Trapalhões na Guerra dos Planetas
- 1979 – O Cinderelo Trapalhão
- 1979 – O Rei e os Trapalhões
- 1980 – Os Três Mosqueteiros Trapalhões
- 1980 – O Incrível Monstro Trapalhão
- 1981 – Os Saltimbancos Trapalhões
- 1982 – Os Trapalhões na Serra Pelada
- 1982 – Os Vagabundos Trapalhões
- 1983 – O Cangaceiro Trapalhão
- 1984 – Os Trapalhões e o Mágico de Oróz
- 1984 – A Filha dos Trapalhões
- 1985 – Os Trapalhões no Reino da Fantasia
- 1986 – Os Trapalhões no Rabo do Cometa
- 1986 – Os Trapalhões e o Rei do Futebol
- 1987 – Os Fantasmas Trapalhões
- 1987 – Os Trapalhões no Auto da Compadecida
- 1988 – Os Heróis Trapalhões - Uma Aventura na Selva
- 1988 – O Casamento dos Trapalhões
- 1989 – A Princesa Xuxa e os Trapalhões
- 1989 – Os Trapalhões na Terra dos Monstros
- 1990 – Uma Escola Atrapalhada
- 1990 – O Mistério de Robin Hood
- 1991 – Os Trapalhões E A Árvore da Juventude
