= List of Brazilian films of 1949 =

A list of films produced in Brazil in 1949:

Title	Director	Cast	Genre	Notes
A Escrava Isaura	Euripides Ramos	Fada Santoro, Cyl Farney, Graça Mello	Drama	
A Mulher de Longe	Lúcio Cardoso	Paul Brandão, Dulce Bressane, Fred Bruger	Drama	
Almas Adversas	Leo Marten	Bibi Ferreira, Graça Mello, Fregolente	Drama	
Caminhos do Sul	Fernando De Barros	Maria Della Costa, Orlando Villar, Tônia Carrero	Adventure	
Carnaval no Fogo	Watson Macedo	Oscarito, Grande Otelo, Modesto De Souza	Musical comedy	
Dominó Negro	Moacyr Fenelon	Elvira Pagã, Paulo Porto, Álvaro Aguiar	Crime	
Estou Aí	José Cajado Filho	Colé Santana, Celeste Aída, Pedro Dias	Musical comedy	
Eu Quero é Movimento	Luiz de Barros	Augusto Aníbal, Severino Araujo, Badu	Musical comedy	
Inocência	Fernando De Barros, Luiz de Barros	Maria Della Costa, Cláudio Nonelli, Wolfgang Harnisch Jr.	Romance	
Iracema	Vittorio Cardineli, Gino Talamo	Ilka Soares, Mário Brasini, Luís Tito	Romantic drama	
Luar do Sertão	Tito Batini, Mário Civelli	Fernando Baleroni, Nhá Barbina, Nena Batista	Drama	
O Homem que Passa	Moacyr Fenelon	Rodolfo Mayer, Lourdinha Bittencourt, Paulo Porto	Drama	
Pinguinho de Gente	Gilda de Abreu	Isabel de Barros, Lúcia Delor, Vera Nunes	Drama	
Pra Lá de Boa	Luiz de Barros	Augusto Aníbal, Lamartine Babo, Carlos Barbosa	Musical comedy	
Quase no Céu	Oduvaldo Vianna	Vida Alves, Walter Avancini, Dionísio Azevedo	Adventure	
Também Somos Irmãos	José Carlos Burle	Leonora Augusta, Aguinaldo Camargo, Ayres Campos	Drama	
Vendaval Maravilhoso	José Leitão de Barros	Paulo Maurício, Amália Rodrigues, Barreto Poeira	Historical drama	

== See also ==
- 1949 in Brazil
