= Iracema =

1865 indigenous novel by José de Alencar

Iracema: The Legend of Ceará
- Title page of the 1886 English-language translation
- Author: José de Alencar
- Original title: Iracema; Iracema - A Lenda do Ceará
- Translator: Lady Isabel Burton
- Language: Portuguese
- Series: Alencar's indigenist novels
- Genre: Romance novel
- Publisher: B. L. Garnier
- Publication date: 1865
- Publication place: Brazil
- English publication date: 1886
- ISBN: 978-0-85051-500-8; ISBN 978-0-85051-524-4 (English)
- Preceded by: O Guarany
- Followed by: Ubirajara
- Original text: Iracema; Iracema - A Lenda do Ceará at Portuguese Wikisource
- Translation: Iracema: The Legend of Ceará at Wikisource

Iracema (Portuguese pronunciation: [i.raˈse.mɐ], in Portuguese: Iracema - A Lenda do Ceará) is one of the three indigenous novels by José de Alencar. It was first published in 1865. The novel has been adapted into several films.

== Plot introduction ==
The story revolves around the relationship between the Tabajara indigenous woman Iracema and the Portuguese colonist Martim, who was allied with the Tabajara nation's enemies, the Pitiguaras.

Through the novel, Alencar tries to remake the history of the Brazilian colonial state of Ceará, with Moacir, the son of Iracema and Martim, as the first true Brazilian in Ceará. This pure Brazilian is born from the love of the natural, innocence (Iracema), culture and knowledge (Martim), and also represents the mixture (miscegenation) of the native race with the European race to produce a new caboclo race.

=== Explanation of the novel's title ===
Iracema is Guarani language for honey-lips, from ira - honey, and tembe - lips. Tembe changed to ceme, as in the word ceme iba, according to the author.

"Iracema" is also an anagram of "America", noted by critics as befitting the allegorization of colonization of America, the novel's main theme.

== Characters in Iracema ==
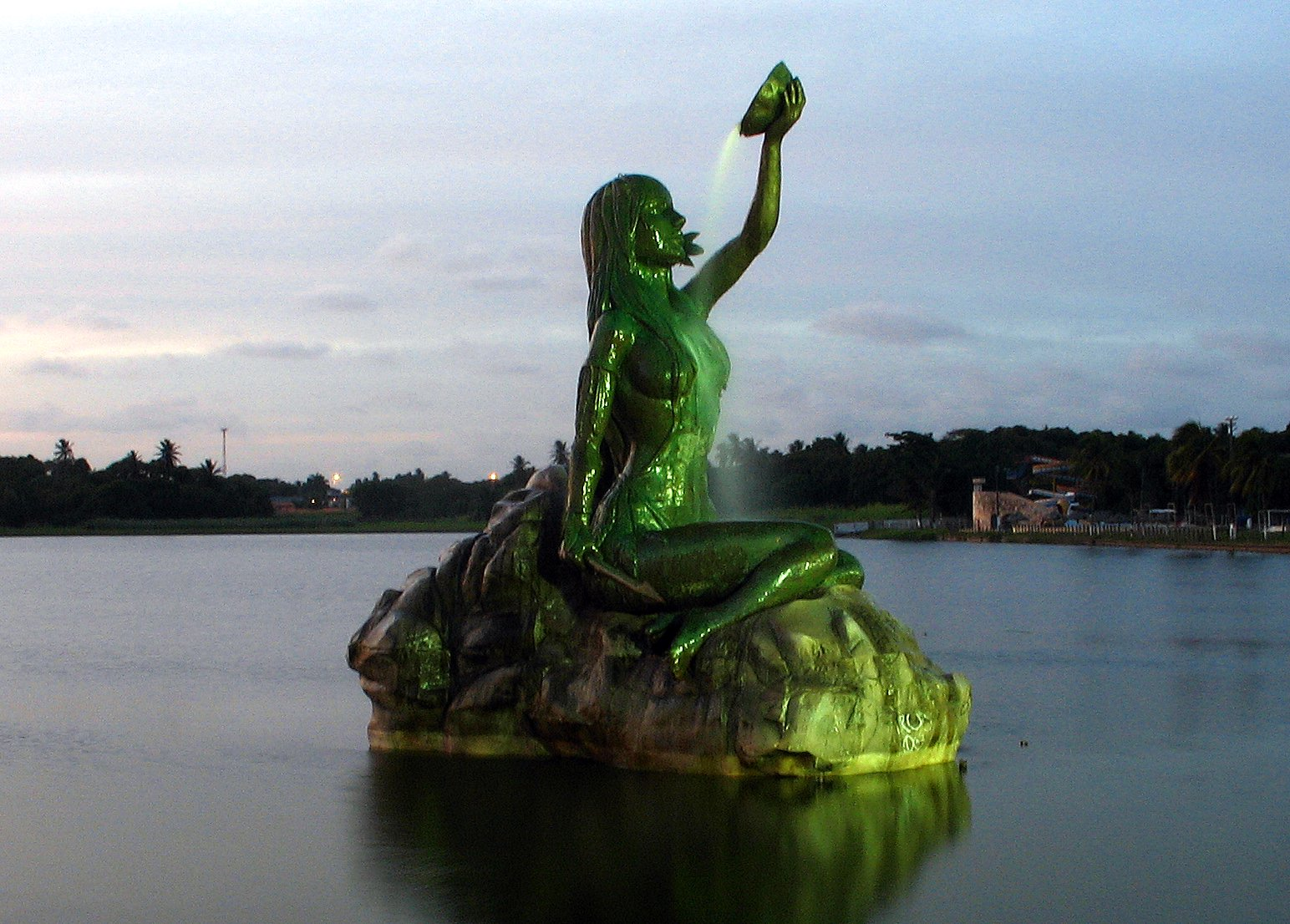
Statue in honor of Iracema in Fortaleza at Messejana lagoon.

- Andira: Araquém's brother. Old warrior and hero of his people.
- Araquém: Iracema's father. Spiritual leader of the Tabajara's nation.
- Batuireté: Poti's grandfather
- Caubi: Iracema's brother
- Iracema: Araquém's daughter. She is the beautiful Tabajara woman with honey-lips and dark hair.
- Irapuã: The warrior leader of the Tabajara nation.
- Jacaúna: Poti's brother.
- Jatobá: Poti's father. He is an important veteran warrior of the Pitiguara's nation.
- Martim: Portuguese colonist. Named in honor of Mars, the Roman god of war.
- Moacir: The child of Martim and Iracema.
- Poti: Martim's friend and the Pitiguara warrior who is brother of the Pitiguara leader.

== Iracema and the Indianist novels ==
Iracema, along with the novels O Guarani and Ubirajara, portrays one of the stages of the formation of the Brazilian ethnic and cultural heritage. Iracema symbolizes the initial meeting between the white man (Europeans) and the natives. "Moacir" means "Son of Pain", which is related to his birth, alone with his mother, who was abandoned by Martim for some time when he had to go and help the Potiguaras in a tribal war against the Tabajaras.

== Awards and nominations ==
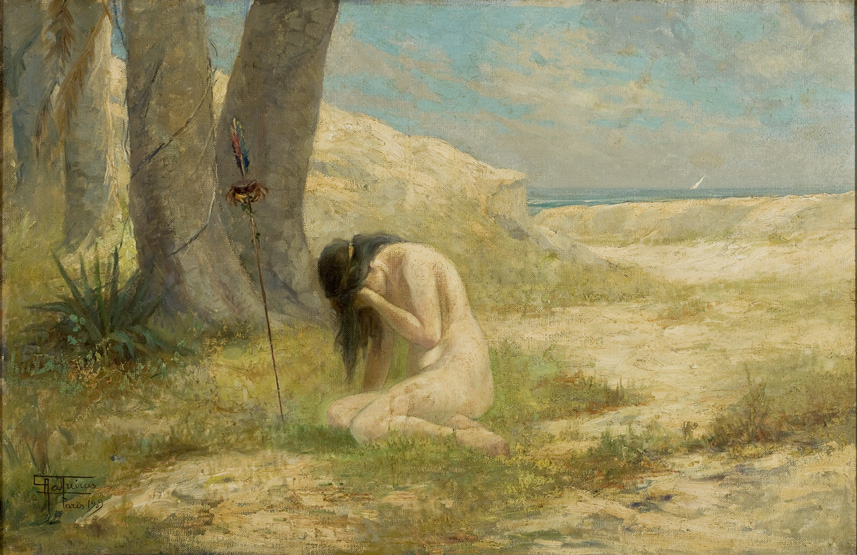
"Iracema", painting by Antônio Parreiras

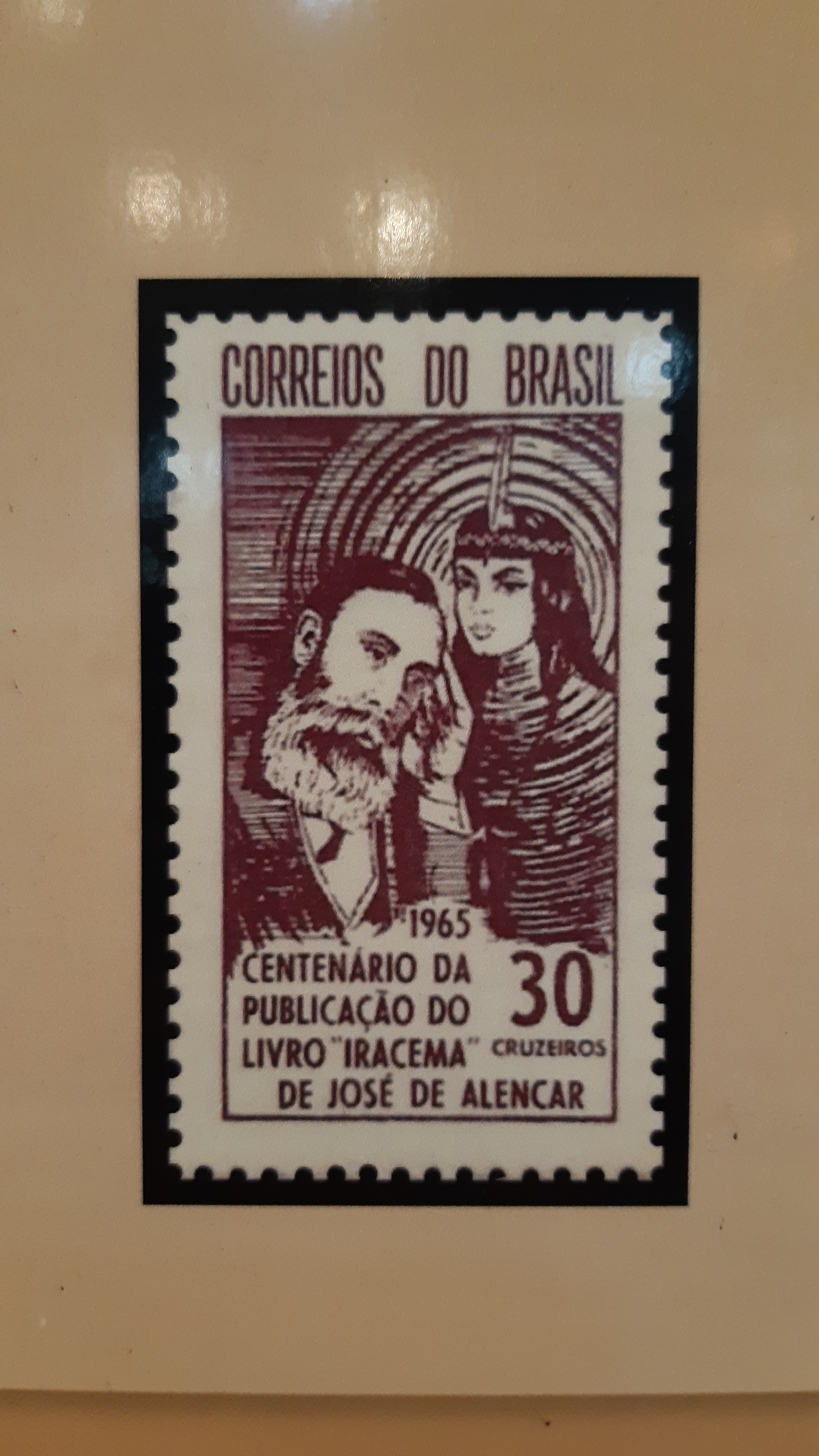
1965 stamp commemorating the centenary of the book

- There is a Brazilian stamp in honor of Iracema's centennial (1865/1965) and its author.
- There is a Brazilian painting by Antônio Parreiras.
- Iracema is cited in Manifesto Antropófago (Cannibal Manifesto), which is published in 1928 by Oswald de Andrade

== Adaptations ==
The novel was adapted in 1917 as a Brazilian silent film directed by Vittorio Capellaro and starring Iracema de Alencar, and in 1949 as a Brazilian film directed by Vittorio Cardineli and Gino Talamo, starring Ilka Soares. In 1956, Adoniran Barbosa composed the popular samba song "Iracema". The 1975 film Iracema: Uma Transa Amazônica directed by Jorge Bodansky and Orlando Senna, which was screened at the International Critics' Week of the 1976 Cannes Film Festival.

== Statues ==
There are two statues representing Iracema at the Avenida Beira Mar in Fortaleza. One is at Coordinates 3°43'22.99"S, 38°29'3.60"W and the other is at Iracema Beach at Coordinates 3°43'14.04"S, 38°30'34.43"W. This second statue was made by Zenon Barreto and was idealized in 1960. It was constructed on 1996 for the 100th anniversary of the publication, but fell down on 3 May 2022 for unknown reasons.

== Bibliography ==
- Alencar, José de. Iracema (1865) Rio de Janeiro: B. L. Garnier. (in Portuguese) ISBN 0-85051-500-9
- Alencar, José de. Iracema, the honey lips: a legend of Brasil (1886) translated by Lady Isabel Burton. London: Bickers & Son. ISBN 0-85051-524-6
- Alencar, José de. Iracema (2000) translated by Clifford Landers. New York: Oxford University Press. ISBN 0-19-511547-3
- Burns, E. Bradford. A Working Bibliography for the Study of Brazilian History The Americas, Vol. 22, No. 1 (Jul., 1965), pp. 54–88
