= José de Alencar (disambiguation) =

José de Alencar (1829–1877) was a Brazilian novelist and playwright.

José de Alencar or José Alencar may also refer to:

- José Martiniano Pereira de Alencar (1794–1860), Brazilian politician, priest and poet
- José Alencar (1931–2011), Brazilian vice-president from 2003 to 2010
- Theatro José de Alencar, a theater in Fortaleza, Ceará, Brazil
