= 1949 in Brazil =

Events in the year 1949 in Brazil.

== Incumbents ==
=== Federal government ===
- President: Marshal Eurico Gaspar Dutra
- Vice President: Nereu Ramos

=== Governors ===
- Alagoas: Silvestre Pericles
- Amazonas: Leopoldo da Silva Amorim Neves
- Bahia: Otávio Mangabeira
- Ceará: Faustino de Albuquerque
- Espírito Santo: Carlos Fernando Monteiro Lindenberg
- Goiás: Jerônimo Coimbra Bueno
- Maranhão: Sebastian Archer
- Mato Grosso: Arnaldo Estêvão de Figueiredo
- Minas Gerais: Milton Soares Campos
- Pará: Luís de Moura Carvalho
- Paraíba: Osvaldo Trigueiro
- Paraná: Moisés Lupion
- Pernambuco: Alexandre Barbosa Lima Sobrinho
- Piauí: José da Rocha Furtado
- Rio de Janeiro: Macedo Soares
- Rio Grande do Norte: José Augusto Varela
- Rio Grande do Sul: Walter Só Jobim
- Santa Catarina: Aderbal Ramos da Silva
- São Paulo: Ademar de Barros
- Sergipe: Jose Rollemberg

=== Vice governors ===
- Ceará: Francisco de Menezes Pimentel
- Espírito Santo: José Rodrigues Sette
- Goiás: Hosanah de Campos Guimarães
- Maranhão: Saturnino Bello
- Minas Gerais: José Ribeiro Pena
- Paraíba: José Targino Pereira da Costa
- Piauí: Osvaldo da Costa e Silva
- Rio Grande do Norte: Tomaz Salustino
- São Paulo: Luís Gonzaga Novelli Júnior

== Events ==
- date unknown - The Centro Brasileiro de Pesquisas Físicas is founded by Cesar Lattes, José Leite Lopes, and Jayme Tiomno.

=== January ===
- 25 January: IEPAC, the forerunner of UniÍtalo, is founded by professor and Italian immigrant Pasquale Cascino.

=== February ===
- 1 February: The Roman Catholic Diocese of Macapá is established as Territorial Prelature of Macapá from the Territorial Prelature of Santarém.

=== May ===
- 11 May: Brazil defeats Paraguay 7-0 to win the 1949 South American Championship.

=== July ===
- 12 July: The first issue of the comic O Pato Donald is launched, giving rise to Editora Abril, founded by Victor Civita.

== Arts and culture ==
=== Books ===
- Maria José Dupré - Dona Lola

=== Films ===
- Almas Adversas
- Estou Aí
- A Escrava Isaura
- O Homem que Passa
- Inocência
- Pinguinho de Gente
- Vendaval Maravilhoso

=== Music ===
- Afoxé music is introduced by a group called Filhos de Gandhi.

== Births ==
=== January ===
- 27 January: Djavan, singer-songwriter

=== April ===
- 18 April: Antônio Fagundes, actor

=== May ===
- 14 May: Helvécio Ratton, film director, producer and screenwriter

=== August ===
- 12 August: Fernando Collor de Mello, President of Brazil 1990-1992

=== September ===
- 21 September: Odilo Scherer, Archbishop of São Paulo
- 25 September: Ronaldo Caiado, politician

== Deaths ==
=== February ===
- 2 February: Pedro Paulo Bruno, painter, singer and poet (born 1888)

=== December ===
- 11 December: Rudolf Komorek, Salesian missionary (born 1890)

== See also ==
- 1949 in Brazilian football
- List of Brazilian films of 1949
