= Bárbara de Alencar =

Brazilian anti-monarchist revolutionary

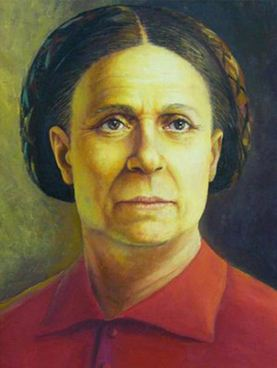
- Born: 11 February 1760; Exu, Pernambuco
- Died: 18 August 1832 (aged 72); Fronteiras, Piauí
- Occupation: Revolutionary
- Spouse: José Gonçalves dos Santos
- Children: José Martiniano Pereira de Alencar
- Parent(s): Joaquim Pereira de Alencar; Theodora Rodrigues da Conceição

Bárbara Pereira de Alencar (11 February 1760 – 18 August 1832) was a Brazilian merchant and revolutionary. She was a major figure in the Pernambucan revolt. She was briefly the president of the Republic of Crato, which was set up in revolt against the Brazilian government. Within 8 days she was captured and tortured by the monarchy, making her the first political prisoner in the history of Brazil.

In 1817, Bárbara participated in her first armed revolt — the Revolution of Crato, which aligned with the broader Pernambucan Revolution and opposed the Portuguese Crown. Together with her sons, the Alencar family ousted the local Portuguese authorities and replaced them with revolutionaries. This new government lasted eight days before Portuguese forces reclaimed control. The consequences for Alencar and her sons were harsh. They were imprisoned under inhumane conditions. After years of legal petitions, letters to the king, and even bribery attempts, they were released in 1820.

She was the mother of José Martiniano Pereira de Alencar and grandmother of the writer José de Alencar and diplomat Baron Leonel Martiniano de Alencar. The writer Paulo Coelho is her sixth-generation descendant.

== Biography ==
Bárbara Pereira de Alencar was born on 11 February 1760 in Senhor Bom Jesus dos Aflitos de Exu, in the hinterlands of Pernambuco, on the Caiçara Farm — owned by the Alencar family patriarch, the Portuguese Leonel de Alencar Rego, her grandfather. As a teenager, Bárbara moved to the then village of Crato, in Ceará, where she married the Portuguese merchant José Gonçalves dos Santos. The republican heroine was the mother of the revolutionary leaders José Martiniano Pereira de Alencar and Tristão Gonçalves.

Her father, along with other ancestors, founded the town of Exu. The Alencar family began accumulating wealth through cattle raising and the cultivation of cotton and sugarcane. Through the economic dynamics of the period, they expanded their influence throughout Pernambuco and Ceará, especially the interior, gaining visibility, respect, and political influence.

One of the famous stories from Alencar's childhood is that she survived an attack by indigenous warriors on her family’s home, which was burned down. Her escape and survival were seen as early signs of her strength and resilience. Later, according to the book "Independência do Brasil, as mulheres estavam lá", particularly in the chapter dedicated to her, Alencar chose to marry a man of her preference — 30 years her senior — despite her parents' disapproval. Due to her strong opinions and behavior in an era when female empowerment was unheard of, she earned the reputation of a “woman-man” — a label meant to convey her toughness and assertiveness.

As a multifaceted matriarch, Alencar defied societal expectations. She raised five children, cared for her ill father, managed the family’s distillery (producing cachaça and rapadura), and pursued entrepreneurial ventures, such as investing in cooking pots, despite her husband’s objections. At age 32, Alencar began active political engagement. She was introduced to liberal Enlightenment thinkers like Voltaire, Montesquieu, and Rousseau by the naturalist Manoel de Arruda Câmara. In 1809, after becoming a widow, she officially assumed control of her family — a role she had unofficially held for years.

In 1810, she was called a heroine for her anti-monarchical stance even before the revolution began — a title bestowed by her friend and revolutionary ally, Arruda Câmara. Her children also adopted liberal ideals, influenced by her example. These liberal ideas awakened a political consciousness in Bárbara and her sons, who joined others in the struggle to free Brazil from Portuguese domination. This eventually led to their involvement in the Pernambucan Revolution and the Confederation of the Equator, both of which were rooted in liberal principles.

She financed her sons and other revolutionary participants of the Crato Revolution and relocated to her Alecrim Farm in Piauí during the conflict. Alencar died in 1832 at age 72 on her farm in Piauí.

== Bárbara de Alencar and the Crato Revolution ==
Barbara was the head of the provisional government that was established by the revolutionaries, serving as the president of the Republic of Crato for 8 days. However, she was quickly captured, and was held and tortured in the fortress Fortaleza de Nossa Senhora da Assunção. This made her the first political prisoner in the history of Brazil.

Alencar remains an iconic figure in the Brazilian Northeast’s historical memory, symbolizing female resistance and challenging male political dominance. Her role in the Revolution of Crato (Ceará), which occurred within the context of the Pernambucan Revolution of 1817, was central. On May 4, 1817, the Republic of Crato was proclaimed — a bold uprising that lasted eight days. The movement has even been dubbed the “Revolution of the Alencars.” Although documentation about her direct actions is limited, this stems from a lack of sources rather than a lack of involvement. It's known that Bárbara hosted revolutionary meetings and actively supported the cause. She was ultimately arrested alongside nearly 200 others. While she also contributed to the Pernambucan Revolution and the Confederation of the Equator, it is her role in the Crato uprising that cemented her legacy as a trailblazer for female participation in independence struggles.

== In Poetry ==
In 1980, writer Caetano Ximenes de Aragão published the epic poem Romanceiro de Bárbara, focusing on the Confederation of the Equator and Bárbara's saga in 77 poems. It was recently republished by the Ceará State Department of Culture under the “Luz do Ceará” collection.

== Bárbara: Heroine of the Nation – Bill No. 522/2011 ==
Alencar was included in Brazil’s Book of National Heroes and Heroines (originally only male heroes) thanks to a bill proposed by one of her descendants, Federal Deputy Ana Arraes. This bill aimed to recognize Bárbara's role in Brazil's independence, actions that once labeled her a traitor and led to her imprisonment.

The Bill No. 522/2011, introduced by Arraes (currently Vice President of Brazil’s Federal Court of Accounts), added Bárbara’s name to the “Book of the Heroes of the Nation,” located in the Pantheon of Freedom and Democracy in Brasília. Her recognition opened doors for the inclusion of other female heroines in Brazil’s official history.

== Impact ==
- The Centro Cultural Bárbara de Alencar (Bárbara de Alencar Cultural Center) awards the Bárbara de Alencar Medal every year to three women who act in ways that improve society
- The administrative center of the Government of Ceará is called the Bárbara de Alencar Administrative Center
- A statue of Bárbara de Alencar stands in Fortaleza
- de Alencar's name is inscribed in the book of Brazilian national heroes in the federal cenotaph Tancredo Neves Pantheon of the Fatherland and Freedom
- de Alencar was the subject of an epic poem by the writer Caetano Ximenes de Aragão (pt)
