= Alfarrábios =

1873 novel by José de Alencar

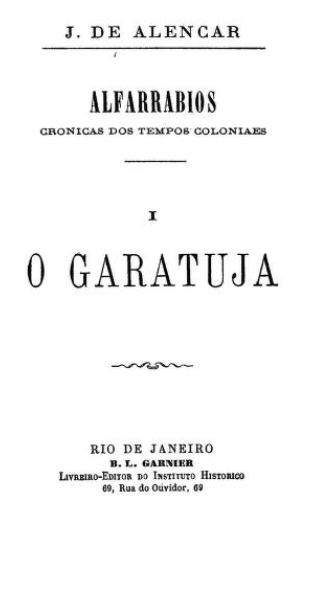
- Title page for Alfarrábios (1873)
- Author: José de Alencar
- Language: Portuguese
- Genre: historical novel
- Publication date: 1873
- Publication place: Brazil

Alfarrábios is a historical novel by the Brazilian writer José de Alencar, first published in 1873. It is composed of three minor narratives: "O Garatuja", "O Ermitão da Glória" and "Alma de Lázaro". Critics consider Alfarrábios an example of Gothic fiction due to its exploration of mystic themes, its virtuous characters and righteous punishment for villains.

"O Garatuja" is a comedic retelling of a love story from 1699 that incited a riot; it is mentioned by Baltasar Lisboa. "O Ermitão da Glória" is a story about a pirate who built the Nossa Senhora da Glória do Outeiro (written in a solemn manner), and "Alma de Lázaro" is about a diary of a person affected with leprosy who is describing their thoughts and the inner conflict between their appearance and soul.

Alfarrábios was published in two volumes; Alencar indicated that he will publish the third volume later but it never happened. Alencar claimed that all three stories were drafted in his youth. The book gives some insight into the life of Rio de Janeiro during the colonial era.

"O Garatuja" was adapted into an opera by Ernst Mahle.
