= Drought cycle (Brazilian literature) =

Drought Cycle is the name given to the "drought novels cycle," a Brazilian literary era that had as main theme the life in the Brazilian backlands.

It began with the publication of O sertanejo of José de Alencar (1876), and lasted until the first decade of the twentieth century. The main characters of the drought cycle literature are bandits, migrants and blesseds. In the cycle stand the Ceará writers.

"Os sertões was a landmark, work of sociology, literature and war story, written by Euclides da Cunha with obvious admiration for the country people, understanding their struggles against nature and protest against the contempt with which handles the federal government."

Gilberto Freyre was influenced by this literary tendency. Other relevant authors are Raquel de Queirós, José Lins do Rego, Jorge Amado, Graciliano Ramos, Antônio Callado, until Guimarães Rosa.

== See also ==
- Brazilian literature
- Agreste
- Sertão
- Caatinga
