= O Guarani =

O Guarani may refer to:

- The Guarani (O Guarani), an 1857 Brazilian novel by José de Alencar
- O Guarani (1912 film), a silent Brazilian film
- O Guarani (1916 film), a silent Brazilian film
- O Guarani (1922 film), a silent Brazilian film
- O Guaraní, a 1926 Brazilian silent film
- O Guarani (1979 film), a Brazilian film
- O Guarani (1996 film), a Brazilian film
- O Guarani (miniseries), a 1991 Brazilian TV mini-series
