= Araci =

Municipality of Bahia, Brazil

- Municipality
- Flag Coat of arms

- Location in Brazil
- Coordinates: 11°19′58″S 38°58′01″W
- Country: Brazil
- Region: Nordeste
- State: Bahia

Population (2022)
  - Total: 48 294
- Time zone: UTC−3 (BRT)
- Website: https://www.araci.ba.gov.br/

Araci is a municipality in the state of Bahia in the North-East region of Brazil. Belonging to the Northeast of the Brazilian state of Bahia, it also comprises, alongside other municipalities, the region known as the Territory of Sisal.

Its headquarters are approximately 210 km (130.5 mi) from the capital Salvador and has a territorial area of 1 496 km² (577.7 sq mi). It also has a population of 48 294 people

== Etymology ==
The name Araci is derived from José de Alencar's novel Ubirajara. It combines ara (day) with cy (mother), thus meaning Mother of the Day. The meaning inspired the composition of the municipality's anthem by musician Ramos Freirense. The name also inspired writer and poet Antônio Fernando Peltier in writing multiple poems for the city

== See also ==
- List of municipalities in Bahia
- Municipalities of Brazil
