= Mário de Alencar =

Brazilian writer

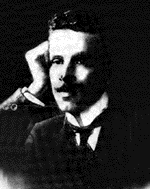
- Born: Mário Cochrane de Alencar; 30 January 1872; Rio de Janeiro, Empire of Brazil
- Died: 8 December 1925 (aged 53); Rio de Janeiro, Brazil
- Education: University of São Paulo
- Occupations: Poet, short story writer, journalist, novelist, lawyer
- Relatives: José de Alencar, José Martiniano Pereira de Alencar, Leonel Martiniano de Alencar
- Writing career
- Pen name: John Alone

Mário Cochrane de Alencar (30 January 1872 – 8 December 1925) was a Brazilian poet, short story writer, journalist, lawyer and novelist. He was one of the children of famous novelist José de Alencar.

He occupied the 21st chair of the Brazilian Academy of Letters from 1905 until his death in 1925.

== Biography ==
Born in Rio de Janeiro, to famous novelist José de Alencar and Georgina Augusta Cochrane, daughter of a British aristocrat. He was the grandson of politician José Martiniano Pereira de Alencar, nephew of diplomat Leonel Martiniano de Alencar, the Baron of Alencar, and brother of politician and diplomat Augusto de Alencar. He made his primary studies in the Colégio Pedro II and graduated in law at the Faculty of Law of São Paulo.

He collaborated for newspapers such as Brasilea (1917), Correio do Povo (1880), Gazeta de Notícias (1894), O Imparcial and A Imprensa (1900), Jornal do Commercio, O Mundo Literário, Renascença, Revista Brasileira (1895–1899) and the Official Magazine of the Brazilian Academy of Letters. He wrote under the pen names Deina and John Alone in some of those.

== Trivia ==
Chronicler Carlos Heitor Cony alleges that Mário could have been an illegitimate son of Machado de Assis, since both Mário and Joaquim suffered from epilepsy, while José de Alencar did not. Mário also called Machado de Assis "father" constantly in his letters addressed to him. This affair allegedly served as inspiration for Assis' famous novel Dom Casmurro.

== Works ==
- Lágrimas (1888)
- Versos (1902)
- Ode Cívica ao Brasil (1903)
- Dicionário de Rimas (1906)
- Alguns Escritos (1910)
- O Que Tinha Que Ser (1912)
- Se Eu Fosse Político (1913)
- Catulo da Paixão Cearense (1919)
- Contos e Impressões (1920)

Preceded by José do Patrocínio (founder)	Brazilian Academy of Letters – Occupant of the 21st chair 1905–1925	Succeeded by Olegário Mariano
