= Cinco Minutos =

Cinco Minutos may refer to:

- Five Minutes (novel) or Cinco Minutos, a novel by José de Alencar
- "Cinco Minutos" (song), a song by Gloria Trevi

== See also ==
- Five Minutes (disambiguation)
