= Praia de Iracema =

Neighborhood in Fortaleza, Brazil

Coordinates: 3°43′5.02″S 38°30′55.01″W

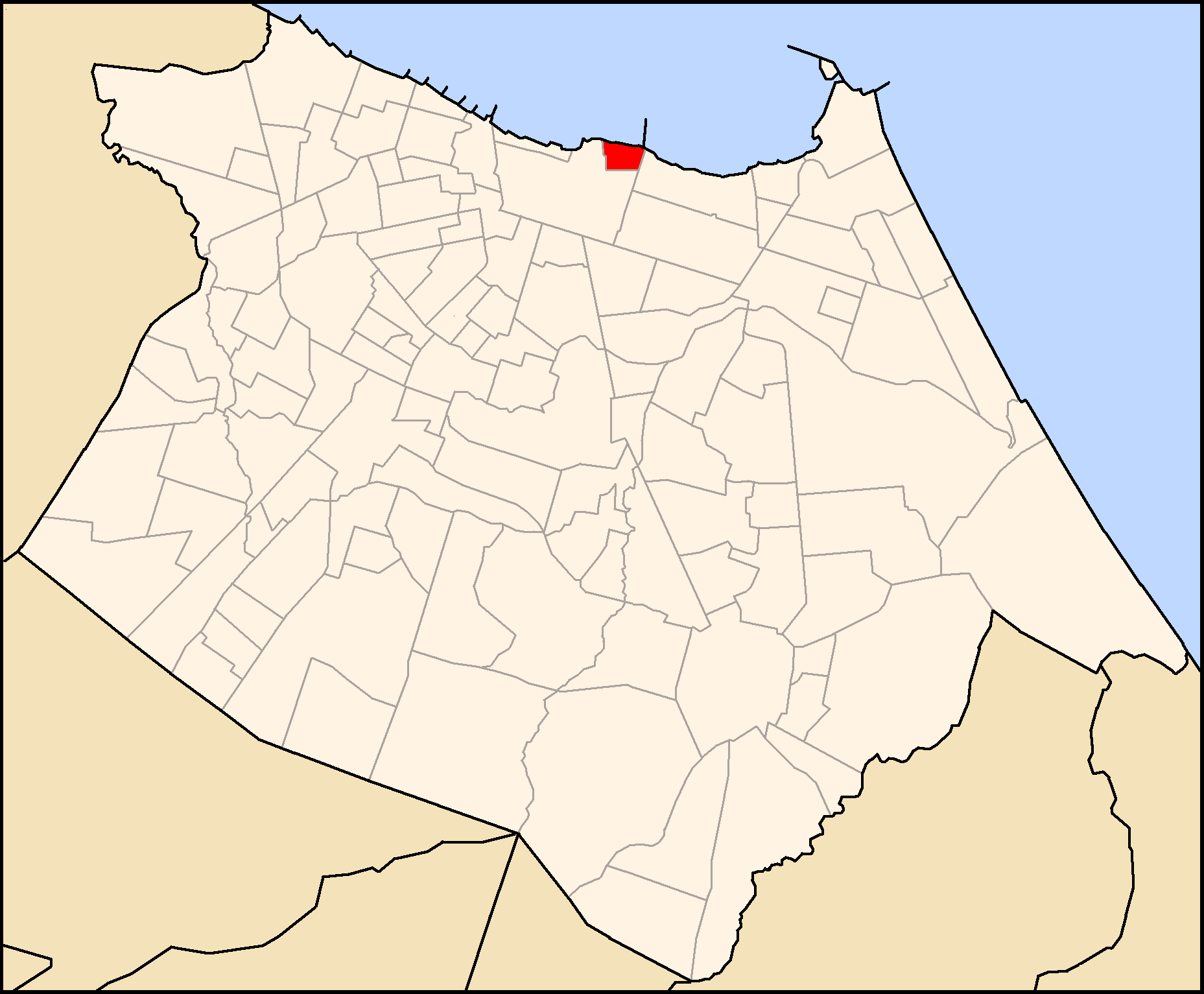
Location of the neighborhood in Fortaleza

Praia de Iracema (lit. "Iracema Beach") is a beach and a neighborhood located in the Brazilian city of Fortaleza in the state of Ceará. Its name comes from the character Iracema that gives name to a famous novel by the cearense writer José de Alencar.

In the past the locality was called Porto das Jangadas (lit. "Jangadas Port") and then Praia do Peixe (lit. "Fish Beach"), now Praia de Iracema. Until 1947, it was the port area of Fortaleza, with loading and unloading of goods and people through the Ponte Metálica (lit. "Metallic Bridge"), deactivated after the construction of the Port of Mucuripe. Today it is a bohemian neighborhood of the city.

== Cultural heritage ==
In 2003, Municipal Law No. 8,799 declared the Praia de Iracema area to be of relevant cultural interest for protection under Fortaleza's historic and cultural heritage legislation.

The neighborhood is also home to the Dragão do Mar Center of Art and Culture, a cultural complex linked to the Ceará state culture department. Its facilities and programming include museums, cinemas, a planetarium, theatres, exhibitions and musical events.

== Urban redevelopment ==
In April 2023, the municipal government began a redevelopment project covering approximately 200,000 m^{2} (2,200,000 sq ft) from Rui Barbosa Avenue to the vicinity of the former Ponte Metálica. The plan encompassed the Praia de Iracema promenade and Poço da Draga, with new pavements, small public squares, a cycle path, LED lighting, public toilets and landscaping.

Reconstruction work on the Ponte dos Ingleses began in July 2023. The project replaced its storm-damaged wooden deck with a concrete structure and provided for renewed railings, lighting, kiosks, landscaping and a sunset observation deck.

== Photos gallery ==
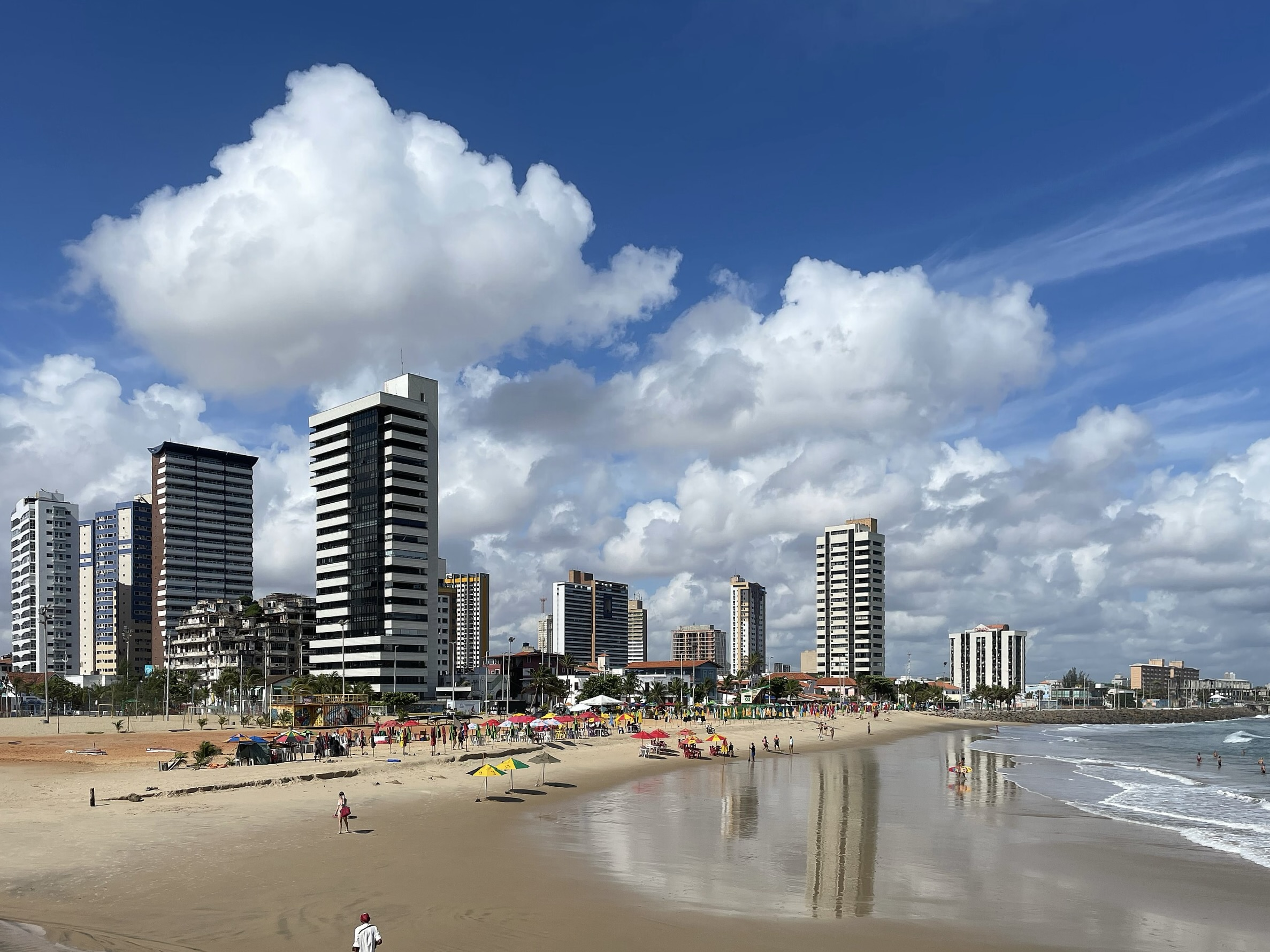
Praia de Iracema (Iracema beach)

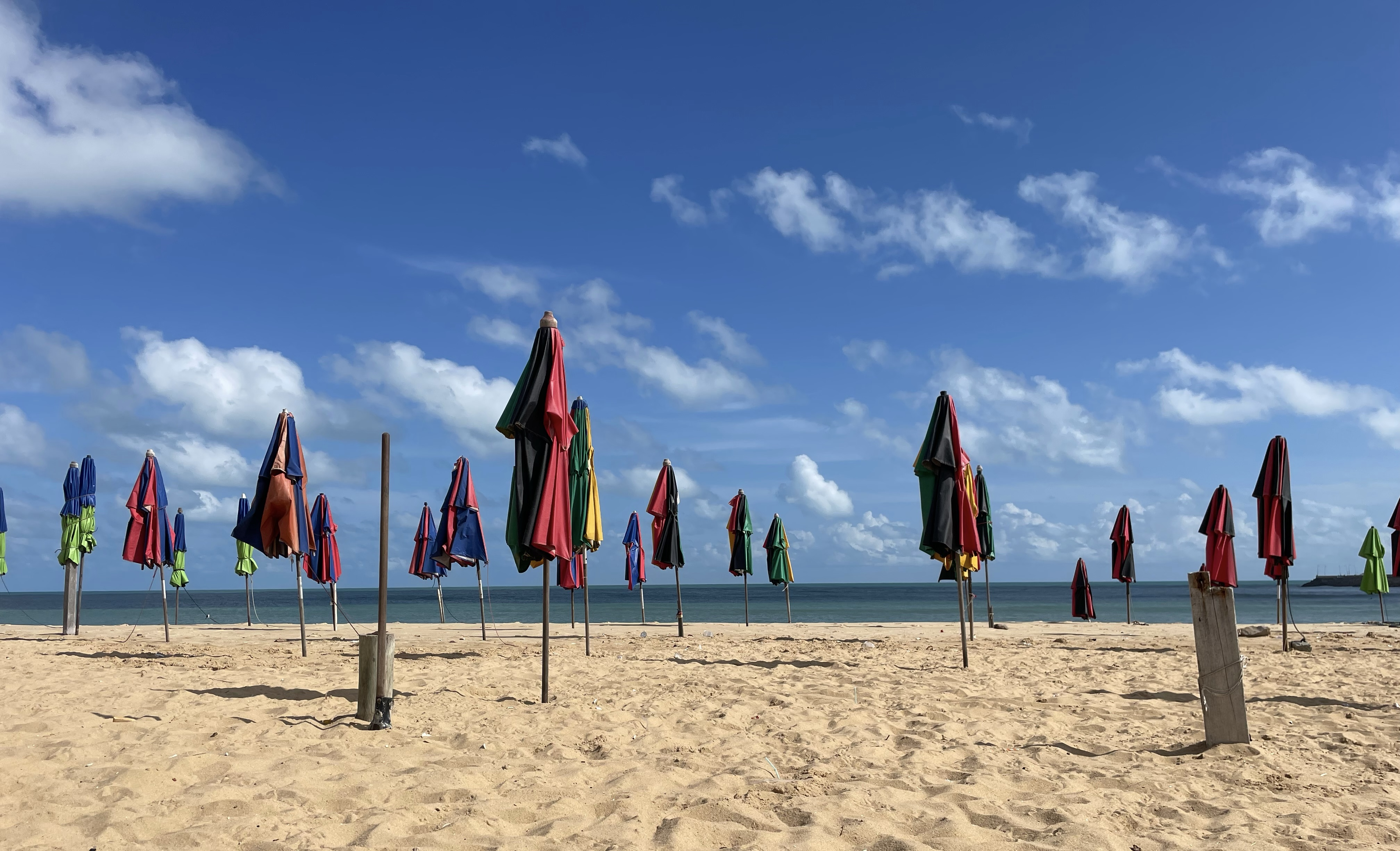
Iracema beach

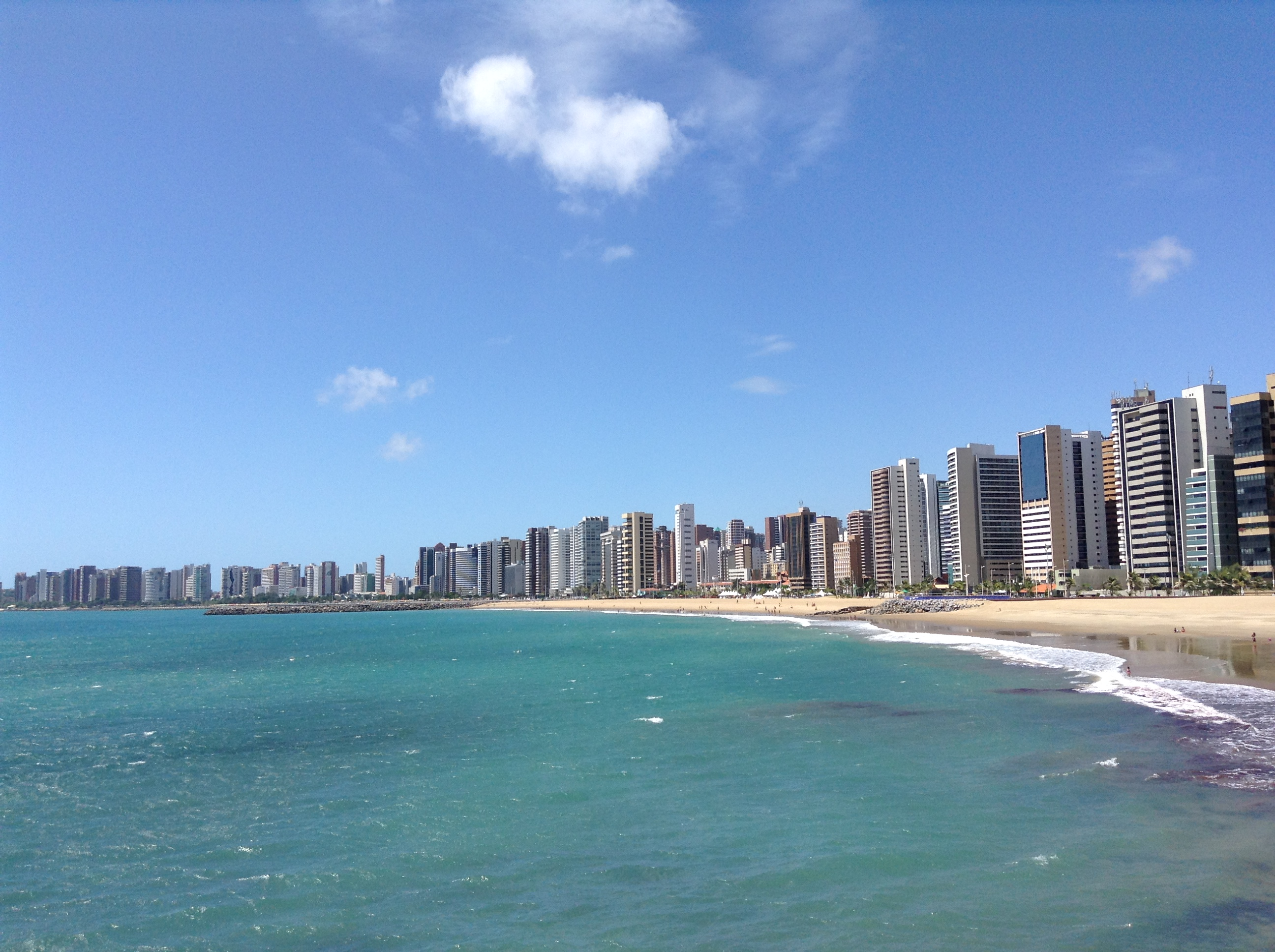
Praia de Iracema

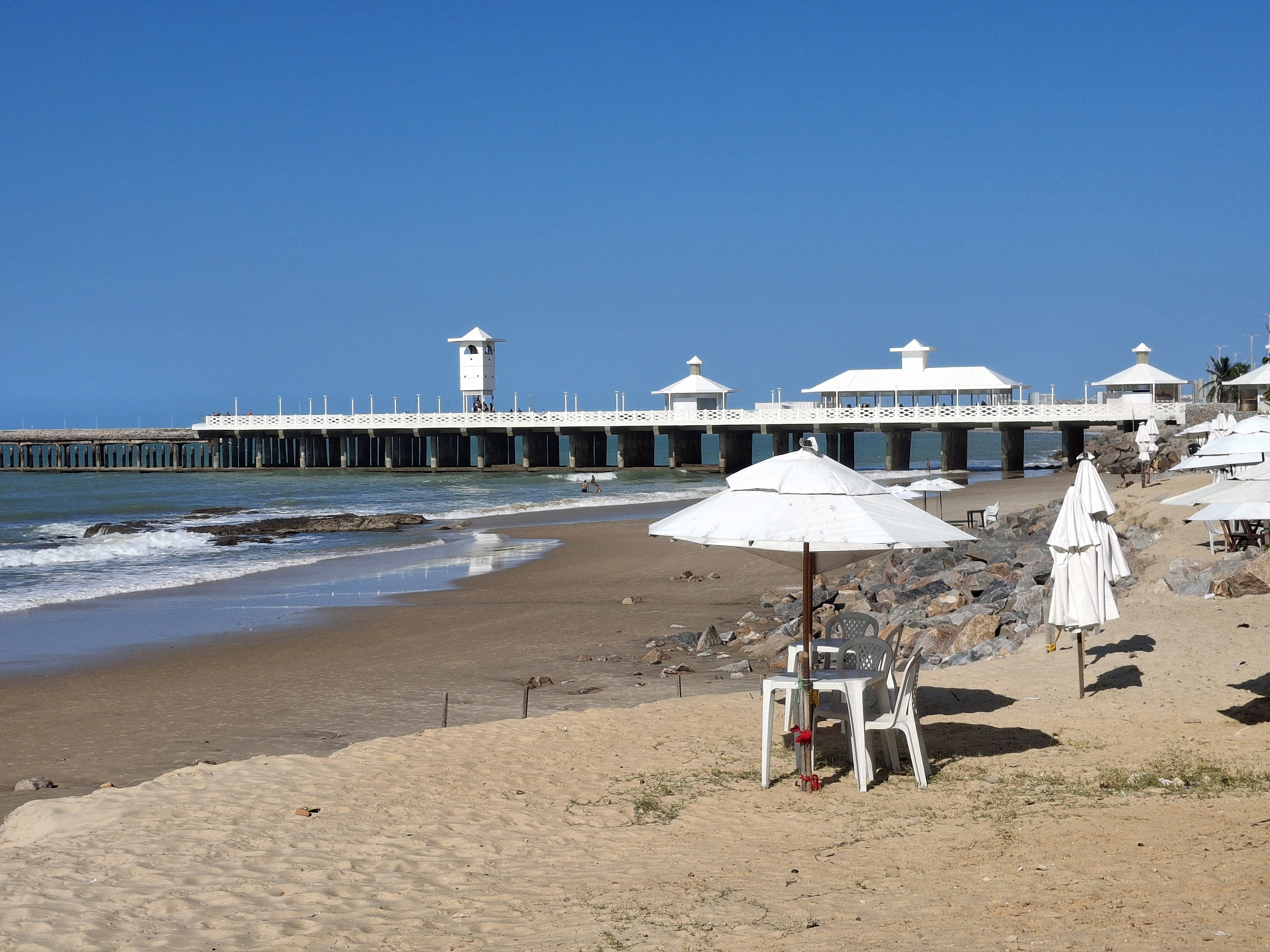
Ponte dos Ingleses, sometimes mistakenly called Ponte Metálica, that is another structure located west of this and served as a port.

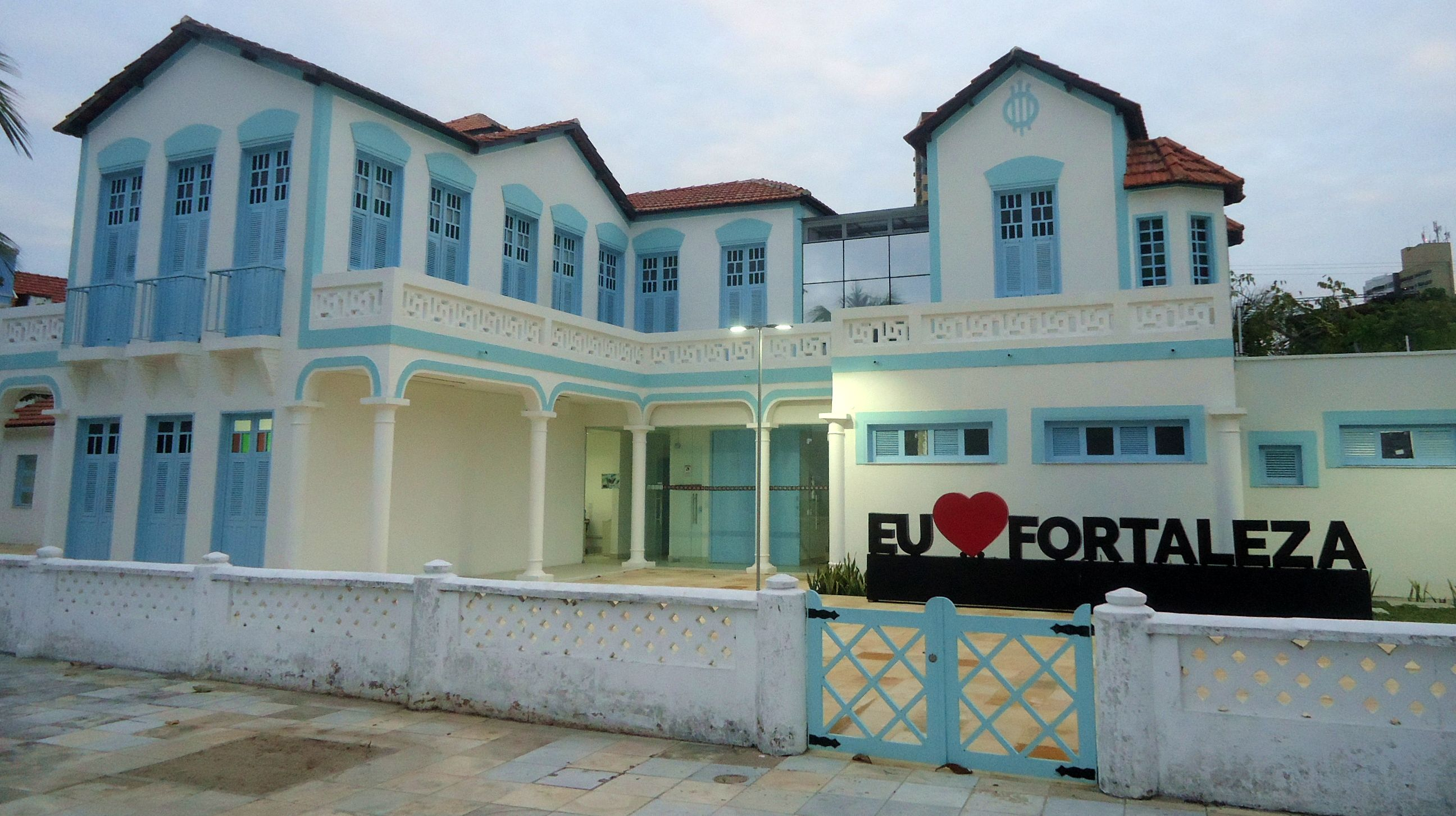
Estoril in Praia de Iracema (Iracema beach)
