= Encarnação =

Encarnação may refer to:

- Encarnação (novel), 1893 novel by José de Alencar
- Encarnação (Lisbon), former parish in the municipality of Lisbon
- Encarnação (Lisbon Metro), station on the Lisbon Metro
- José Luis Encarnação (born 1941), Portuguese computer scientist
- Telma Encarnação (born 2001), Portuguese footballer
