= 1874 in literature =

This article contains information about the literary events and publications of 1874.

== Events ==
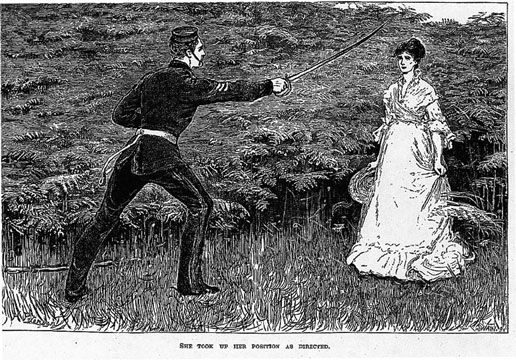
"She took up her position as directed." Troy courts Bathsheba in Far from the Madding Crowd; Cornhill illustration by Helen Paterson Allingham

- January – Thomas Hardy's Far from the Madding Crowd, the first novel set specifically in Thomas Hardy's Wessex, begins publication as an anonymous serial in The Cornhill Magazine, It appears on November 23 in two volumes from his publisher, Smith, Elder & Co. of London.
- February – Anthony Trollope's satirical novel The Way We Live Now (set in 1872, written in 1873) begins publication in monthly shilling parts in London, as one of the last major Victorian novels published in that format. It is completed and appears in two volumes in 1875.
- February 11 – Alexandre Dumas, fils, is admitted to the Académie française.
- March – Arthur Rimbaud moves to London with the French poet Germain Nouveau.
- October – The German literary and political periodical Deutsche Rundschau is established by Julius Rodenberg in Berlin.
- November – After completing a four-year prison sentence for thefts and frauds at Waldheim, Saxony, Karl May has his first story, "Die Rose von Ernstthal" ("The Story of Rose Ernstthal"), published.
- unknown dates
  - Arthur William à Beckett joins the staff of Punch.
  - Mark Twain moves into the house he has had built adjacent to that of Harriet Beecher Stowe in Hartford, Connecticut, where he will live until 1891 and work on his classic novels.
  - Johan Nicolai Madvig begins to lose his sight, forcing him to give up most of his research and writing.

== New books ==
=== Fiction ===
- Thomas Bailey Aldrich – Prudence Palfrey
- José de Alencar – Ubirajara
- Jules Amédée Barbey d'Aurevilly – Les Diaboliques
- R. M. Ballantyne – The Pirate City
- Ambrose Bierce – Cobwebs from an Empty Skull
- Andrew Blair – Annals of the Twenty-Ninth Century
- Mary Elizabeth Braddon – Lost For Love
- William Wells Brown – The Rising Son
- Marcus Clarke – For the Term of His Natural Life (book publication)
- Wilkie Collins – The Frozen Deep and Other Stories
- Alphonse Daudet – Fromont jeune et Risler aîné
- Amelia Edwards – A Night on the Borders of the Black Forest
- George Eliot – Middlemarch (first single-volume publication)
- Gustave Flaubert – The Temptation of Saint Anthony
- Émile Gaboriau – Other People's Money / A Great Robbery
- Thomas Hardy – Far From the Madding Crowd
- Marie Howland – Papa's Own Girl
- Victor Hugo – Ninety-Three
- J.-K. Huysmans – Le Drageoir aux épices
- Nikolai Leskov – A Decayed Family («Захуда′лый род», Zakhudaly rod published serially in Russkiy Vestnik)
- Eliza Lynn Linton – Patricia Kemball
- George Meredith – Beauchamp's Career
- Margaret Oliphant – A Rose in June
- Theodor Storm
  - Paul the Puppeteer (Pole Poppenspäler)
  - Viola Tricolor
- Anthony Trollope
  - Harry Heathcote of Gangoil: A Tale of Australian Bush Life
  - Lady Anna (novel)
  - Phineas Redux
- Juan Valera y Alcalá-Galiano – Pepita Jiménez
- Mrs. Henry Wood – Johnny Ludlow
- Edmund Yates – The Impending Sword
- Émile Zola – La Conquête de Plassans

=== Children and young people ===
- Emilia Marryat – Amongst the Maoris
- Mrs. O. F. Walton – Christie's Old Organ

=== Drama ===
- José Echegaray – La esposa del vengador (The Avenger's Wife)
- Adolphe d'Ennery and Eugène Cormon – The Two Orphans (Les Deux Orphelines)
- Sami Frashëri – Besâ yâhut Âhde Vefâ (Albanian: Besa ose Mbajtja e Fjalës; English: Besa or The Given Word of Trust)
- W. S. Gilbert
  - Charity
  - Rosencrantz and Guildenstern: A tragic episode in three tabloids (published; first performed 1891)
- Henry Glapthorne (died c. 1643) – The Plays and Poems of Henry Glapthorne: Now first collected with illustrative notes and a memoir of the Author
- Victorien Sardou – La Haine (Hatred)
- Jules Verne and Adolphe d'Ennery – Around the World in Eighty Days (stage adaptation)

=== Poetry ===
- Stéphane Mallarmé – "L'après-midi d'un faune"
- Paul Verlaine – Romances sans paroles

=== Non-fiction ===
- Franz Brentano – Psychologie vom Empirischen Standpunkte (Psychology from Empirical Standpoints)
- William Cullen Bryant – Picturesque America, vol. 2
- Charles Darwin – The Descent of Man, and Selection in Relation to Sex
- John William Draper – A History of the Conflict between Religion and Science
- Gustav Jaeger – Deutschlands Tierwelt nach ihren Standorten (Germany's Animal Life by Location)
- Robert C. Kedzie – Shadows from the Walls of Death
- Henry Maudsley – Mental Responsibility in Health and Disease (also as Responsibility in Mental Illness)
- John Neal – Portland Illustrated
- Elise Otté – Scandinavian History
- Antonio Raimondi – El Perú
- Dorothy Wordsworth (died 1855) – Recollections of a Tour Made in Scotland, A. D. 1803

== Births ==
- January 16 – Robert W. Service, English-born Canadian poet (died 1958)
- January 17 – Thornton Burgess, American children's writer (died 1965)
- January 25 – W. Somerset Maugham, British novelist (died 1965)
- February 1 – Hugo von Hofmannsthal, Austrian writer (died 1929)
- February 3 – Gertrude Stein, American-born writer and arts patron (died 1946)
- February 9 – Amy Lowell, American poet (died 1925)
- February 11 – Elsa Beskow (Elsa Maartman), Swedish children's book and fairy-tale writer (died 1953)
- February 13 – Elsa Lindberg, Swedish writer of harem stories (died 1944)
- February 20 – Gordon Bottomley, English poet, writer of verse drama (died 1948)
- February 27 – F. M. Cornford, English classicist and poet (died 1943)
- March 20 – Börries von Münchhausen, German poet (died 1945)
- March 26 – Robert Frost, American poet (died 1963)
- April 28 – Karl Kraus, Austrian writer and journalist (died 1936)
- May 29 – G. K. Chesterton, English novelist, writer and poet (died 1936)
- June 20 – Trumbull Stickney, American poet (died 1904)
- July 29 – August Stramm, German Expressionist poet and playwright (killed in action 1915)
- August 8 – Tristan Klingsor (Arthur Justin Léon Leclère), French poet (died 1966)
- August 14 – Bertha M. Wilson, American playwright, critic, and actress (died 1936)
- October 6 – Ursula Bethell, English-born New Zealand poet (died 1945)
- November 20 – Nicolae Constantin Batzaria, Ottoman-born Romanian humorist, novelist, editor, and journalist (died 1952)
- November 30:
  - Lucy Maud Montgomery, Canadian novelist (died 1942)
  - Paul Zarifopol, Romanian critic (died 1934)
- December 12 – Volter Kilpi, Finnish novelist (died 1939)
- c. December 13 – Radu D. Rosetti, Romanian poet and playwright (died 1964)
- December 26 – J. H. M. Abbott, Australian novelist and poet (died 1953)
- December 31 – Holbrook Jackson, English journalist, writer, publisher and bibliophile (died 1948)

== Deaths ==
- January 24 – Adam Black, Scottish publisher (born 1784)
- January 26 – Giuseppe Rovani, Italian novelist (born 1818)
- February 8 – David Strauss, German theologian (born 1808)
- February 9 – Jules Michelet, French historian (born 1798)
- February 23 – Shirley Brooks, English journalist and novelist (born 1816)
- March 3 – Francis Mason, English-born American grammarian and translator (born 1799)
- March 4 – Ada Clare, American journalist (born 1834)
- March 24 – Joseph Tracy, American newspaper editor and historian (born 1793)
- June 19 – Jules Janin, French critic (born 1804)
- July 7 – John Heneage Jesse, English historian (born 1815)
- July 8 – Agnes Strickland, English popular historian and poet (born 1796)
- July 12 – Fritz Reuter, German novelist (born 1810)
- August 8 – Augustin Theiner, German theologian and historian (born 1804)
- September 20 – Victor Séjour, American-born Creole novelist and dramatist writing in French (born 1817)
- October 5 – Bryan Procter, English poet (born 1787), who wrote under the pseudonym Barry Cornwall
- October 24 – Thomas Miller, English poet (born 1807)
- November 20 – Tom Hood, English humorist (born 1835)
