= A pata da gazela =

1870 novel by José de Alencar

- Author: José de Alencar
- Language: Portuguese
- Publication date: 1870
- Publication place: Brazil
- Preceded by: O gaúcho
- Followed by: O tronco do ipê

A pata da gazela ('The Foot of the Gazelle') is a novel written by the Brazilian writer José de Alencar. It was first published in 1870.

== Plot ==
Set in Rio de Janeiro, the novel recounts the rivalry of two young men, the wealthy and idle Horacio and the hard-working Leopoldo, for Amélia, a businessman's daughter. Horacio is captivated by the beautiful feet he imagines she has; her servant dropped one of her shoes in the street. Leopoldo is captivated by her character as well as her appearance, imagining the beauty of her smile. Both men are discouraged when they receive the mistaken impression that she has a misshapen foot; for Horacio, this is the end of his love for her, but Leopoldo still loves her and they marry. Through her window, Horacio then sees her slip off her shoes to reveal two tiny, perfect feet. He slinks away, saying to himself in a reference to a La Fontaine fable, "The Lion in Love", "The lion has been crushed by the gazelle's foot" ("O leão ... foi esmagado pela pata da gazela").

== Background and analysis ==
A pata da gazela is one of Alencar's contemporary or urban novels, in which he reflected the cosmopolitan society of late 19th-century Brazil by adapting European models, such as Balzac's "human comedy", while using Rio as his setting. Alencar appended a note about his use of Portuguese spellings for words of foreign origin, such as champanhe for the French word champagne, and later described the novel as a product of Brazil's cultural "adolescence", when it was endeavouring to integrate foreign influences.

In contrast to his historical novels, Alencar's urban novels were aimed primarily at a female audience and focussed on romance, as reflected in their titles. The plot of A pata da gazela can be seen as a reversal of the "Cinderella" story; rather than one suitor choosing between women on the basis of their foot, Amélia has two suitors to choose between who see her foot differently. Alencar used the situation to comment on reality and illusion. He received criticism from some other realist writers for having Amélia's foot indeed be beautiful, but responded in the prologue to the first edition of his play As asas de um anjo that art cannot deny beauty: "não é a arte que renega do belo". Using an ironically literarily aware narrator, the novel also satirises the Romantic obsession with love and the description of passion; Alencar critiques both suitors' behaviour and shows both to be fantasising, and both to be fixated on Amélia's shape, while Amélia herself is aware of Horacio's obsession and arranges the misleading appearance of the deformed foot—which belongs to someone else—to test him. The element of foot fetishism has led to some criticism of the novel, and the final scene makes the reader disturbingly complicit in voyeurism.
