= A guerra dos mascates =

1873 novel by José de Alencar

A Guerra Dos Mascates
- Author: José de Alencar
- Genre: Romance
- Published: Vol. I 1873, Vol. II 1874
- Publication place: Brazil
- Pages: 238

Guerra dos Mascates, first edition

A guerra dos mascates (“The War of the Peddlers”) is a Portuguese-language novel written by the Brazilian writer José de Alencar. It is a historical novel set during the war of the same name which occurred in Pernambuco from 1710-1711.

The novel, written in 1870 after the author's disillusionment with politics, was published in two volumes: the first in 1873, the second in 1874. Alencar included several notes to the reader in these volumes. In all he warns against the temptation of readers to "see contemporary characters disguised in the figures of the last century."
