= Ernst Mahle =

Brazilian composer (1929–2025)

Ernst Mahle (3 January 1929 – 12 May 2025) was a Brazilian composer and orchestra conductor of German birth.

== Life and career ==
Mahle was born in Stuttgart, Württemberg, Germany on 3 January 1929. He studied music with Johann Nepomuk David in Stuttgart before coming to Brazil in 1951, and then with Hans-Joachim Koellreutter in Piracicaba. He became a Brazilian citizen in 1962. In 1953, he was one of the founders of the Escola de Música de Piracicaba. After teaching music there, he became artistic director and conductor of the orchestra and choir of the institute, holding these posts for more than fifty years.

In 2005, Mahle composed the opera O Garatuja, libretto by Eugênio Leandro. The opera was based on the homonymous novel by José de Alencar, which was premiered on 27 April 2006, at the Teatro Municipal de Piracicaba "Dr Losso Netto". He was a member of the Brazilian Academy of Music (chair no. 6).

Mahle died in Piracicaba, São Paulo on 12 May 2025, at the age of 96.

== Works ==
- Marroquinhas Fru-Fru (1974) opera, libretto by Maria Clara Machado
- A Moreninha (1979) opera, libretto by José Maria Ferreira
- O Garatuja (2006) opera, libretto by Eugênio Leandro
- Isaura (2023) opera

== Sources ==
- Paulo Affonso de Moura Ferreira: Ernst Mahle: Catálogo de obras (Brasília: Ministério das Relações Exteriores, 1976).
- Eliane Tokeshi: "As sonatas e sonatinas para violino e piano de Ernst Mahle: Uma abordagem dos aspectos estilísticos", in I Seminário Nacional de Pesquisa em Performance Musical. III: Belo Horizonte, 2000, edited by André Cavazotti, pp. 43–56 (Belo Horizonte: Universidade Federal de Minas Gerais, 2001); also constituting the journal Per musi: Revista de performance musical no. 3 (January–June 2001).
