= O Guaraní =

1926 film

- Directed by: Vittorio Capellaro
- Written by: José de Alencar, Vittorio Capellaro
- Produced by: Vittorio Capellaro
- Cinematography: Paulo Benedetti, Vittorio Capellaro
- Distributed by: Capellaro Filmes, Paramount Pictures
- Release date: 18 October 1926
- Country: Brazil
- Language: Silent

O Guaraní is a 1926 Brazilian drama film directed by Vittorio Capellaro based on the novel The Guarani by José de Alencar.

The film premiered in Rio de Janeiro on 18 October 1926.

== Cast ==
- Mazza Amanda Mauceri as Ceci
- Gilberto Bianchini
- Vittorio Capellaro
- Domenico Cesarini
- Margarida Collado
- Tácito de Souza as Peri
- Armando Manceri
- Gastão Menichelli
- Giuseppe Menichelli
- Tina Montresor
- Giorgio Moro
- Ernesto Papini
- Luigi Pianconi as Dom Antônio de Mariz
- Mario Piazzi
- Giovanni Schiatti
- Greta Walkyria
