= Iracema (1949 film) =

1949 film directed by Gino Talamo

- Directed by: Vittorio Cardineli; Gino Talamo
- Written by: Mário Silva; Vittorio Cardineli
- Based on: Iracema by José de Alencar
- Produced by: Henrique Ferrari
- Starring: Ilka Soares; Mário Brasini; Luís Tito; Carlos Machado
- Cinematography: Amleto Daissé
- Edited by: Gino Talamo
- Music by: Concordio Donicelli
- Production company: Nova Terra Filmes
- Release date: 1949
- Country: Brazil
- Language: Portuguese

Iracema is a 1949 Brazilian historical drama film directed by Vittorio Cardineli and Gino Talamo and starring Ilka Soares, Mário Brasini and Luís Tito. The film is an adaptation of José de Alencar's 1865 novel of the same title. The story is set against the early contacts between European and Native Americans in what became Brazil.

== Cast ==
- Ilka Soares as Iracema
- Mário Brasini as Martins
- Luís Tito as Poty
- Nicolai Jartulary as Irapuã
- Carlos Machado as Araken
- Coaracy Pereira as Iracema's son
