= O Garatuja =

Opera by Ernst Mahle

- Opera by Ernst Mahle
- Librettist: Eugênio Leandro
- Language: Portuguese
- Based on: O Garatuja by José de Alencar
- Premiere: April 27, 2006; Teatro Municipal "Dr Losso Netto", Piracicaba, Brazil

O Garatuja is an opera composed by Ernst Mahle in 2005, with libretto written by Eugênio Leandro. The opera is based on the homonymous novel by José de Alencar (1873) and premiered in Piracicaba at the Teatro Municipal "Dr Losso Netto" on 27 April 2006.
