= The Guarani =

Novel by José de Alencar

The Guarani: Brazilian Novel
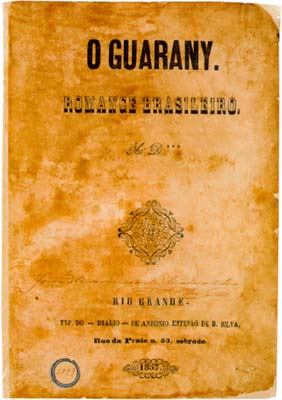
- Cover of the first edition, financed by Alencar himself
- Author: José de Alencar
- Original title: O Guarani: Romance Brasileiro
- Translator: James W. Hawes
- Language: Portuguese
- Publication date: 1857
- Publication place: Brazil
- English publication date: 1893
- Media type: Serial (hardcover and paperback)

The Guarani: Brazilian Romance (Portuguese: O Guarani: Romance Brasileiro) is an 1857 Brazilian novel written by José de Alencar. It was first serialized in the newspaper Diário do Rio de Janeiro, but due to its enormous success Alencar decided to compile his writing in a volume. A plausible explanation for this success might be in the fact that the novel spoke of freedom and independence, arguing for a nativeness that could be found in tropical nature and in the indigenous people of Brazil.

Years later the novel was turned into an opera performed in Italian and called Il Guarany (1870), by Carlos Gomes, among other places it was presented in Milan and New York (it is a known fact that the author did not appreciate the final result). The Guarani is regarded a foundational text of Brazilian Romanticism, but it gained international projection by being translated into Spanish, German (Der Guarany, Brasilianischer Roman, Maximillian Emerich, 1876) and English (The Guarany, Brazilian novel, James W. Hawes, 1893).

The novel is still widely read nowadays, especially at Brazilian schools as an introduction to novel reading, but also by anyone who enjoys a thrilling adventure story. Literary criticism has tended to link The Guarani to the works of Fenimore Cooper, Chateaubriand and the noble savage from the Rousseauian tradition. However, this interpretation of the novel has become outdated as recent academic works show also how dark, sexual, gothic and lyrical (over narrative, unlike the Fenimore Cooper model) the novel is.

== Plot introduction ==
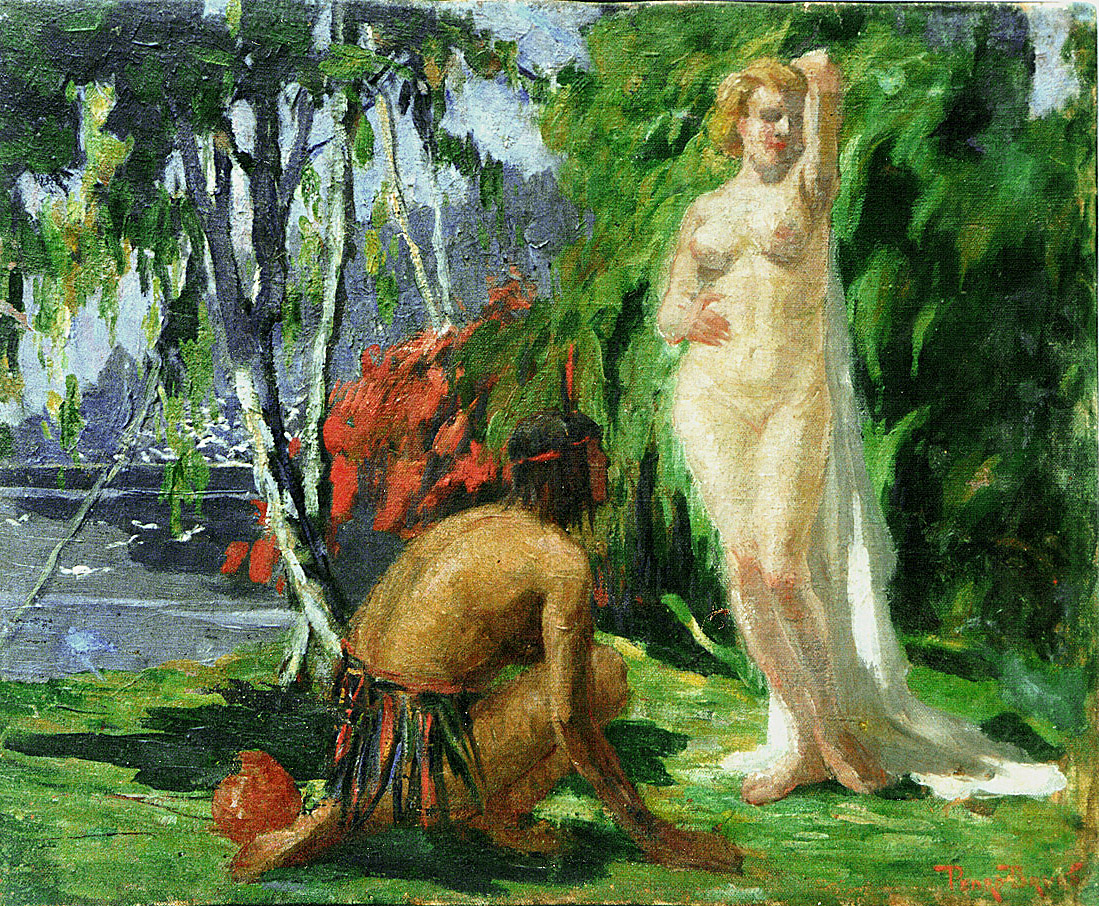
Ceci and Peri by Pedro Bruno

The Guarani is set back in 1604, a period when Portugal and its colonies submitted to Spanish dominion due to a lack of heirs to ascend to the throne. Alencar takes advantage of this dynastic complication to resurrect the historical figure of Dom Antônio de Mariz, one of the founders of the city of Rio de Janeiro and a pioneer settler. This historical (factual) background, which orients the novel throughout, is set in the first two chapters; then fantasy, both violent and erotic, starts to prevail.

D. Antônio establishes himself in a deserted inland region, a few days’ travel from the seaside city of Rio. The land was granted to him through his services to the Portuguese crown, whose legitimacy the nobleman now distrusts. To be politically independent (if not economically) and keep to the Portuguese codes of honour, he builds a castle-like house to shelter his family in Brazilian soil where he lives like a feudal lord with his family and retainers.

His family consists of his severe wife D. Lauriana, his angelic fair, blue-eyed daughter Cecília, his dandyish son D. Diogo and the "niece" Isabel, a cabocla who is in fact his illegitimate daughter by an Indian woman. Other people are also attached to his household: a few loyal servants, forty adventurers/mercenaries kept for protection, the young nobleman Álvaro de Sá, an appropriate suitor for his lawful daughter Cecília, and Peri, an Indian of the Goitacá people, who once saved Cecy’s life (as the romantic/romanticised Indian endearingly calls Cecília) and who has since deserted his tribe and family. Peri is the hero who gives title to the book, he is treated as a friend by D. Antônio and Ceci and as a nuisance by Mrs. Mariz and Isabel. The life of the characters is altered by the arrival of the adventurer Loredano (former friar Angelo di Lucca) who insinuates himself into the house and soon starts subverting the other vassals, planning to kidnap Cecília and scheming against the house of Mariz; along with the accidental murder of an Aimoré Indian woman by D. Diogo.

== Comic adaptations ==
The Guarani is the Brazilian novel with the largest number of adaptations for comics. The first adaptation of the comic book was published in 1927, made by Cícero Valladares for the children magazine O Tico-Tico, this adaptation was condensed into just one page., in 1938 was published an adaptation made by Francisco Acquarone for newspaper Correio Universal. In 1950, it was again adapted by Haitian comic artist André LeBlanc for Edição Maravilhosa #24 published by EBAL. The comic book initially published novels from global literature originally published in Classic Comics and Classics Illustrated. Le Blanc adapted other works by the author: Iracema (scripted by his wife) and the O Tronco do Ipê. The same year the Portuguese illustrator, Jayme Cortez, adapting the novel to the format of comic strips, published in the Diário da Noite. In the 50s it was the turn of the comic writer Gedeone Malagola. He also adapted Iracema and Ubirajara, for the publisher Vida Doméstica. Another adaptation was made by Nilo Cardoso and published by La Selva. In the 1970s it was adapted by Edumundo Rodrigues. Rodrigues also illustrated a new version of the novel by José Alberto Lima. In 2009, the brothers Walter and Eduardo Vetillo published an adaptation by Editora Cortez. The same year the publisher Editora Ática printed an adaptation by Ivan Jaf (script) and Luiz Ge (art), In 2012, Editora Scipione (a publisher of the "Grupo Abril", which also is part of the Editora Ática), published an adaptation of the opera of Carlos Gomes, scripted by Rosana Rios, with drawings by Juliano Oliveira, inks by Sam Hart.

== Film adaptation ==
- In 1926 it was adapted into the Brazilian film O Guaraní directed by Vittorio Capellaro.
- In 1948 it was adapted into the Italian film Guarany directed by Riccardo Freda.

== Modern fiction ==
In the short story "The Last of the Guaranys" by Brazilian writers Octavio Aragão and Carlos Orsi, published in the anthologies The Worlds of Philip José Farmer 3: Portraits of the Trickster (Michael Croteau, ed., Meteor House, 2012) and Tales of the Wold Newton Universe (Win Scott Eckert and Christopher Paul Carey, eds., Titan Books, 2013), Peri is one of the identities adopted by time traveler John Gribardsun (meant to be Edgar Rice Burroughs's Tarzan) in Time's Last Gift, a novel by Philip José Farmer in his Wold Newton family series.
