= O Garimpeiro (film) =

1920 film directed by Vittorio Capellaro

- Directed by: Vittorio Capellaro
- Written by: Vittorio Capellaro
- Based on: O Garimpeiro by Bernardo Guimarães
- Produced by: Vittorio Capellaro
- Cinematography: Paulo Benedetti
- Distributed by: Capellaro Filmes
- Release date: 20 December 1920
- Country: Brazil
- Language: Silent (Portuguese intertitles)

O Garimpeiro is a 1920 Brazilian silent drama film directed by and starring Vittorio Capellaro. It is based on the 1870s novel O Garimpeiro by Bernardo Guimarães.

The film premiered on 20 December 1920 in Rio de Janeiro.

== Cast ==
- Vittorio Capellaro
- Anna Crehneras
- Ernesto Crehneras
- Aurélia Delorme
- Estella Fernandes
- J. Silveira
- Leonel Simi
- Júlia Tibúrcio
