= Sonhos d'ouro =

Sonhos d'ouro is a novel written by the Brazilian writer José de Alencar. It was first published in 1872.

Together with Diva (1864) and Senhora (1875), it is considered one of Alencar's urban novels, which are set in Rio de Janeiro and deal with contemporary issues and the relationship between money and morality.

The novel's protagonist is Ricardo, a fatherless man of 28, who leaves his mother and fiancée in São Paulo, to try to make his way in the young city of Rio de Janeiro.
