= Five Minutes =

Five Minutes or 5 Minutes may refer to:

- Five Minutes (novel), an 1856 novel by Brazilian writer José de Alencar
- "Five Minutes" (Bonzo Goes to Washington song), a 1984 single by Jerry Harrison, Bootsy Collins and Daniel Lazarus
- "Five Minutes" (Lorrie Morgan song)
- "5 Minutes" (Lil' Mo song)
- "5 Minutes" (The Stranglers song)
- "5 Minutes" (Tinie Tempah song)
- "Five Minutes" (1955 song), a 1955 Russian New Year song from the film Carnival Night
