= As minas de prata =

Novel by José de Alencar

As Minas de Prata (Portuguese: The Silver Mines) is a novel written by Brazilian writer José de Alencar. The first part was published in 1865, and in 1866, the second part.
