= Fortaleza de Nossa Senhora da Assunção =

- Fortaleza, Ceará in Brazil
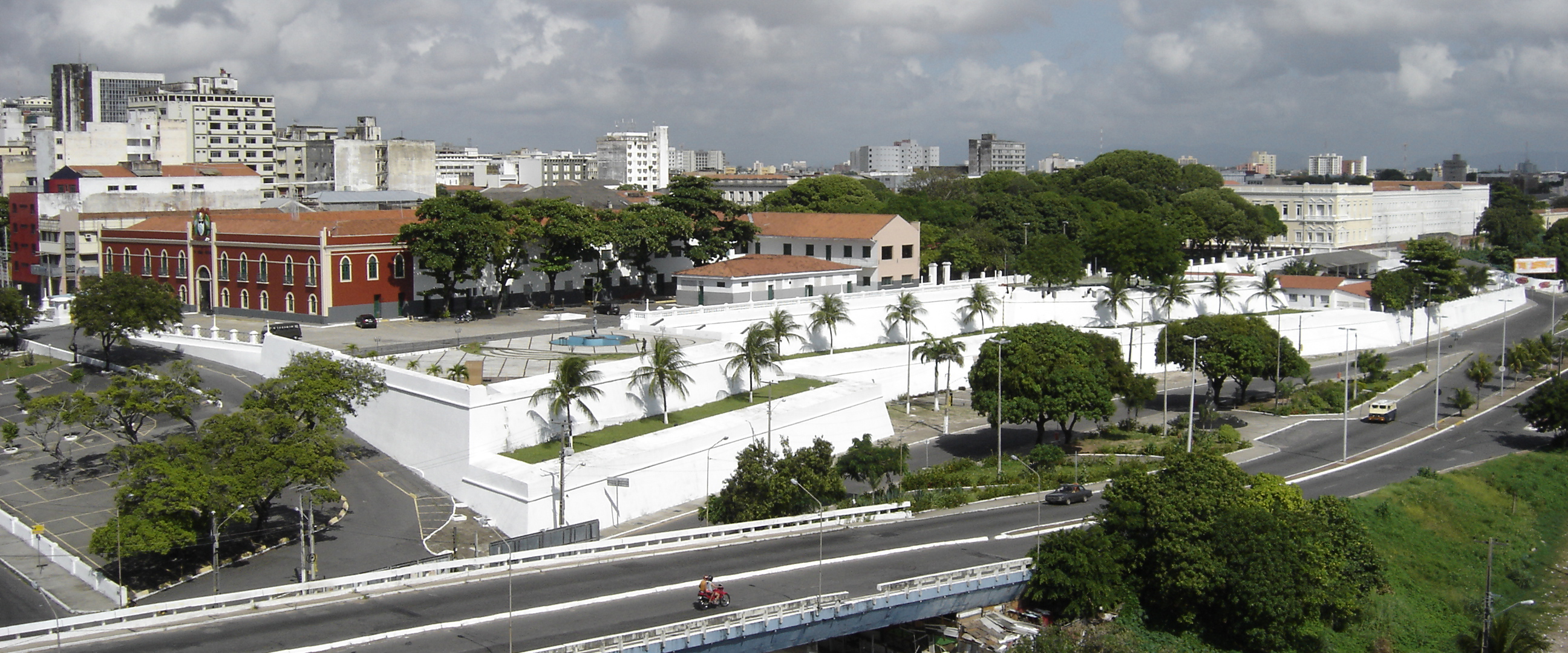
- View of the fort

Site information
- Type: Fort

Location
- Coordinates: 3.722847°S 38.525111°W

Site history
- Built: 1812

Fortaleza de Nossa Senhora da Assunção is a fort located in Fortaleza, Ceará in Brazil.

== See also ==
- Military history of Brazil
