= Rudolf Komórek =

Polish Catholic priest

Venerable Rudolf Komórek SDB
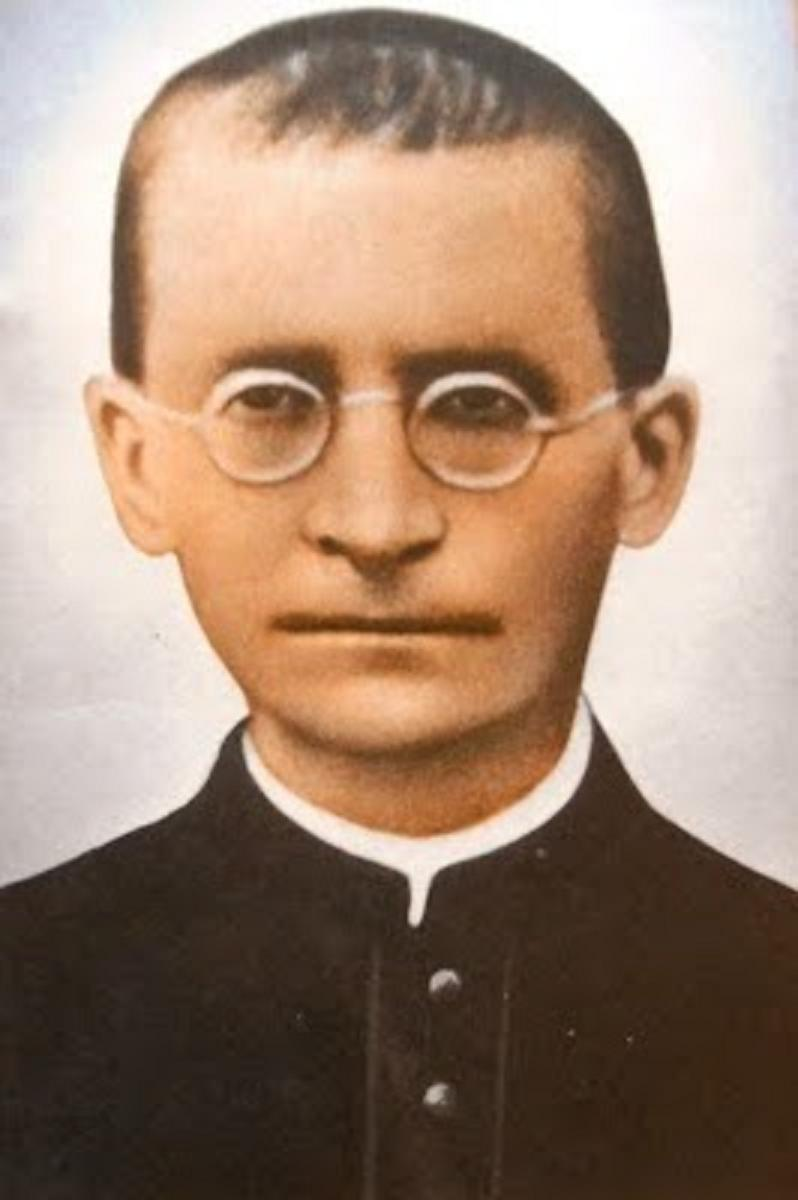
- Born: 11 October 1890; Bielitz, Austrian Silesia, Austria-Hungary
- Died: 11 December 1949 (aged 59); São José dos Campos, São Paulo, Brazil

Rudolf Komórek (11 October 1890 – 11 December 1949) was a Polish religious priest of the Salesians of Don Bosco. He served as in the missions in Brazil. He served during World War I as a hospital chaplain and began the process of joining the order of Saint John Bosco following his time as a prisoner of war in Trento.

His beatification process commenced on 31 January 1964, and he was titled a Servant of God. Pope John Paul II named him to be venerable on 6 April 1995.

== Life ==
Rudolf Komórek was born on 11 October 1890 in Bielitz as the third of seven children of Jan Komórek, a blacksmith, and Agnieszka Gach, seamstress and midwife. His sisters were Maria, Wanda and Valerie and his brothers were Jan, Leopold and Robert. He was baptized on 30 November 1890.

Komórek attended school as a child from 1896 until 1901 when he attended a German high school in his hometown. He passed examinations on 13 July 1909 with distinctions and commenced his studies for the priesthood on 30 September 1909 in Wrocław. He received the sacrament of Confirmation on 20 July 1910 and went on to receive the tonsure on 11 July 1911 from Cardinal Georg von Kopp. Komórek received the minor orders on 11 March 1913 and the title of sub-deacon on the following 13 March. Cardinal Kopp ordained the seminarian to the diaconate on 15 March 1913 while ordaining him to the priesthood on the following 22 July.

Komórek served as the vicar of a local parish from 1 August 1913 until such time when he was appointed to a new position and served in Zabrzeg from 1 March until 31 May 1914. On 1 May 1914 he became a chaplain of the 100 Infantry Regiment as a captain due to the tensions that resulted in World War I and on 1 June moved from Zabrze to Skoczów while later relocating to Kraków tending to the wounded in hospitals. On 13 May 1916 – at his request – he was sent to the frontlines in Leogang and later in Tyrol; his efforts saw him honored by the Red Cross and being awarded the Cross of Merit by Austrian officials.

Italian forces arrested him and kept him as a prisoner of war for two months in Trento; his release allowed him to return home to Poland.

He later joined he Salesians of Don Bosco – upon asking for the permission of Cardinal Adolf Bertram – and commenced his novitiate on 30 October 1922 near Wadowice. Komórek made his temporary vows on 1 November 1932. He was called served in the missions in Brazil and arrived there in October 1924 while arriving in Rio de Janeiro on the following 27 November.

Komórek made his solemn profession as a Salesian on 28 January 1930 in one of their houses and served as a curate in a local parish from 1929 to 1934 while serving in the same position in another location from 1934 to 1936.

In January 1941 a persistent cough worried his superiors which led to the diagnosis of tuberculosis. Komórek died of that ailment in São José dos Campos on 11 December 1949 at 11:20pm while holding a large Crucifix. He was buried in Brazil.

== Beatification process ==
The beatification process opened under Pope Paul VI in Taubaté on 31 January 1964 in an informative process that later concluded its work on 20 June 1969; theologians approved his writings as being in line with the faith on 14 June 1974. The Congregation for the Causes of Saints granted the decree of validation for the process on 20 April 1990 in Rome.

The Congregation for the Causes of Saints received the positio in 1992 and was transferred to their consulting theologians on 29 November 1994 in which the cause received approval; the Congregation themselves approved the process on 14 March 1995. Pope John Paul II declared Komórek to be venerable on 6 April 1995 after confirming his life of heroic virtue. A miracle attributed to Komórek's intercession was approved on 14 January 2010. The postulator assigned to the cause is the Rev. Pierluigi Cameroni and the current vice-postulator is the Bishop Hilario Moser.
