= Mário Brasini =

Brazilian actor, screenwriter and film director (1921–1997)

- Born: 31 January 1921; Rio de Janeiro, Brazil
- Died: October 9, 1997 (aged 76)
- Occupation: Actor
- Years active: 1944-1975 (film)

Mário Brasini (January 31, 1921 – October 9, 1997) was a Brazilian actor, screenwriter and film director.

== Selected filmography ==
=== Actor ===
- Iracema (1949)

== Bibliography ==
- Hammer, Tad Bentley. International film prizes: an encyclopedia. Garland, 1991.
