= O sertanejo =

1875 novel by José de Alencar

O sertanejo (transl. The Backcountry) is an 1875 novel by Brazilian writer José de Alencar.
