= Vittorio Capellaro =

Italian Brazilian film director, film producer, film actor, and screenwriter

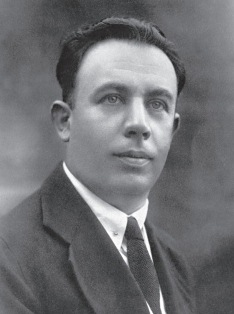
- Born: 21 October 1877; Mongrando, Italy
- Died: 1943 (aged 65–66); Rio de Janeiro, Brazil
- Years active: 1915–1935

Eusebio Vittorio Giovanni Battista Capellaro (1877–1943) was a Brazilian film director, film producer, film actor, and screenwriter who worked in the Cinema of Brazil between 1915 and 1935.

== Biography ==
Capellaro first visited Brazil for theatrical seasons in 1907 and 1913. He returned to the country in 1915 to film Inocência (released in 1917), which he produced, adapted from the novel by Visconde de Taunay, and starred in as an actor. In 1916, he adapted and directed O Guarani, based on the novel by José de Alencar. In 1917, with cinematography by Benedetti, Capellaro produced, directed, and performed in O Cruzeiro do Sul, based on the novel O Mulato by Aluísio de Azevedo. Later in 1917, he returned to Italy to report for military service.

At the end of World War I, he returned once more to Brazil, now married to Giorgina Nodari, who would play the title character in Iracema. The film, based on the work by José de Alencar, was directed and adapted by Capellaro with Benedetti handling cinematography. During this period, he met fellow Italians Alberto Sestini and Gustavo Pinfildi, both cinema owners in Rio. Capellaro traveled to the Northeast of Brazil as a traveling distributor. Shortly thereafter, he resumed his activities as a producer and filmmaker: the first version of Iracema in 1918 (released in 1920), O Garimpeiro in 1920, a remake of O Guarani in 1926 due to the success of the first version, O Caçador de Diamantes in 1932, and Fazendo Fita in 1935.

In 1943, amid the heightened tensions surrounding the pursuit of the "fifth column" during World War II, Capellaro was on a Rio tram when he was identified as Italian by two police officers due to his accent. He was taken to a police station and beaten. After being released, he died a few days later at his home from the injuries sustained during the beating.

== Director filmography ==
- Inocência (1915)
- O Guaraní (1916)
- Iracema (1917)
- O Cruzeiro do Sul (1917)
- O Garimpeiro (1920)
- O Guaraní (1926)
- O Caçador de Diamantes (1934)
- Fazendo Fitas (1935)
