= UniÍtalo =

Private university in São Paulo, Brazil

Coordinates: 23.6436°S 46.7205°W

- Centro Universitário Ítalo Brasileiro
- Type: Private
- Dean: Prof. Dr. Marcos Antonio Gagliardi Cascino
- Location: São Paulo, Brazil
- Website: http://italo.br
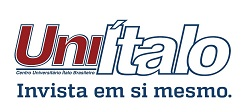

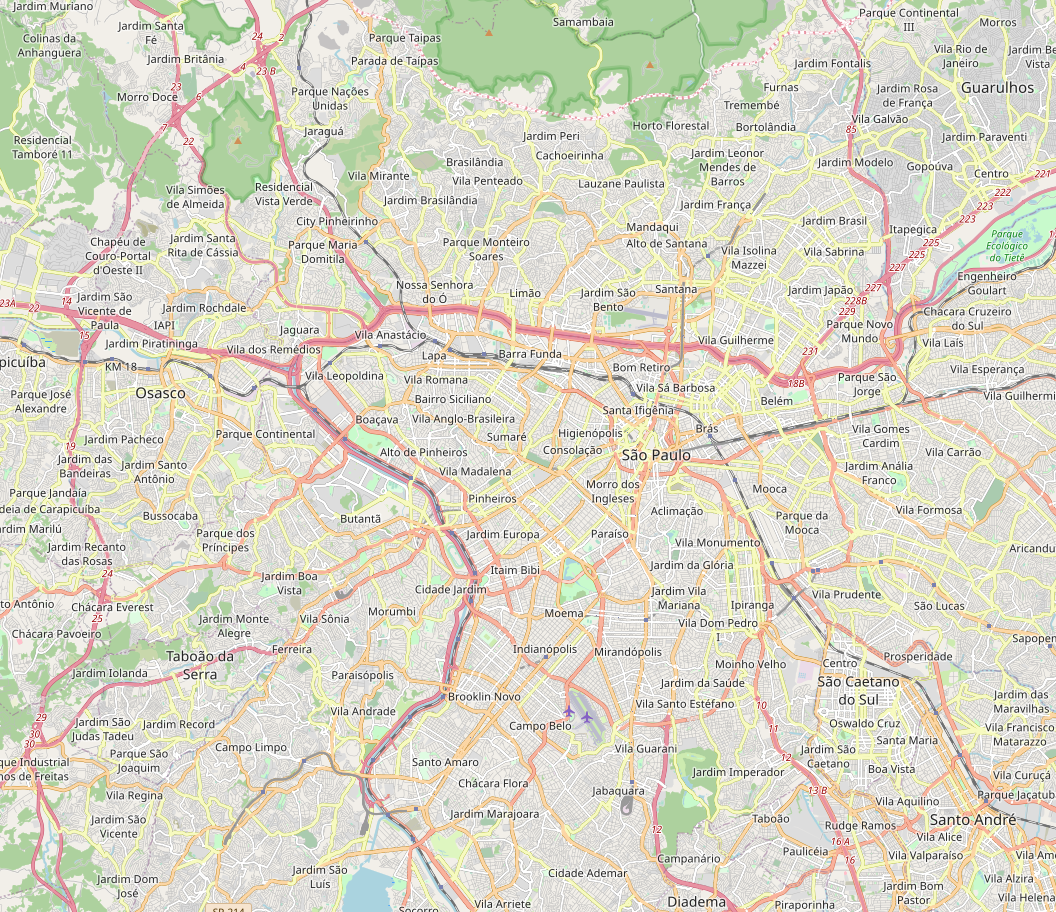
- Location in São Paulo UniÍtalo (São Paulo State) UniÍtalo (Brazil)

Centro Universitário Ítalo Brasileiro (popularly known as UniÍtalo), is a private Brazilian university located in the Santo Amaro district of São Paulo.

UniÍtalo offers 18 undergraduate and 27 graduate degree programs. It also offers university extension courses, online courses and language courses.

== History ==
IEPAC, UniÍtalo's sponsor, was founded by professor and Italian immigrant Pasquale Cascino on January 25, 1949. The university originally only offered typing courses and began offering undergraduate courses in 1972.

In 1994, the institution expanded and moved to the Santo Amaro district of São Paulo. During this period, the university expanded its undergraduate course offerings.

The university began offering graduate courses in 2006. That same year UniÍtalo was formally recognized by the Brazilian Ministry of Education as Centro Universitário Ítalo Brasileiro.

== Alternative Schedule ==
UniÍtalo offers classes in several time slots, including nontraditional times, such as 5:45 AM (dawn). Other available class times are 8 AM, 8:50 AM, 1:30 PM, 2:20 PM and 7 PM.

== Undergraduate Degree Programs ==
- Business
- Accounting Sciences
- Nursing
- Physical Education
- Pedagogics
- Philosophy
- Visual Arts
- Geography
- Linguistics
- Social Services
- Theology
- Psychology

== Technological Degree Programs ==
- HR Management
- Marketing
- Financial Management
- Logistics
- Management Processes (Management of Small and Medium-Sized Businesses)
- System Analysis and Development
- Radiology

== Graduate Degree Programs ==
- Educational Law
- Philosophy
- Teacher Training
- Educational Management
- Educational neuroscience
- Clinical and Institutional Psychopedagogy
- Waldorf Pedagogy
- Interdisciplinary Projects and Educational Practices
- Executive Advisory
- Business Consultancy
- Sports Management and Marketing
- Strategic Marketing Management
- Economic, Financial and Accounting Strategic Management
- Strategic Management of People for Business
- Logistics and Supply Chain Management
- Organizational Psychology
- Executive Management in Leadership for the Formation of Leaders
- Obstetric and Perinatal Nursing
- Health Management: Hospital Management / Public Health / PSF
- Personalized Training Methodology
- Emergency Room and Intensive Care
- Psychometrics
- Mental Health and Psychiatry
- Strength Training: Health, Fitness and Performance
- Personalized Training: From Customer Care to Periodicity
- Water Activities
