= Leonel Martiniano de Alencar, 1st Baron of Alencar =

Brazilian lawyer & diplomat (1832–1921)

His Excellency The Baron of Alencar

Member of the Chamber of Deputies from Amazonas
- In office 6 August 1869 – 18 June 1872
- Monarch: Pedro II
- Preceded by: Viscount of Inhaúma
- Succeeded by: Ângelo Thomas do Amaral

Personal details
- Born: 5 December 1832 Rio de Janeiro, Empire of Brazil
- Died: 25 March 1921 (aged 88) Rio de Janeiro, Brazil
- Domestic partner: Gregoria Eloísa Ayoroa Deheza
- Children: 4
- Parent(s): José Martiniano Pereira de Alencar; Ana Josefina Pereira de Alencar e Pereira de Carvalho
- Education: University of São Paulo
- Occupation: Aristocrat, Lawyer, Diplomat
- Awards: Order of Isabella the Catholic; Order of the Rose; Order of Christ

Leonel Martiniano de Alencar, 1st Baron of Alencar (5 December 1832 – 25 March 1921) was a Brazilian noble, lawyer, politician, and diplomat. He represented Brazil at a diplomatic level on various occasions, namely in South America and Europe. He was the son of the Governor of Ceará, Senator José Martiniano Pereira de Alencar, and the younger brother of famous novelist José de Alencar. His grandmother, Bárbara de Alencar, was a heroine of Brazilian independence and a very wealthy landowner in Pernambuco and Ceará. His first cousin was the Baron of Exu, Guálter Martiniano de Alencar. He was sometimes referred to as L.M., León Car, and Noel D'Arc.

Awarded with the Military Order of Christ, the Order of Isabella the Catholic, the Order of the Rose and the Order of Christ, he was also a member of the Brazilian Historic and Geographic Institute. Because of his distinguished diplomatic, political, and legal career, he was created a Baron in 1885. A distinguished diplomat, he was also a skilled politician, representing the State of Amazonas in the 14th Legislature of the National Assembly between 1869 and 1872.

== Early life and education ==
Leonel Martiniano de Alencar was born in Rio de Janeiro, Brazil, on 5 December 1832. He was a member of the distinguished Alencar family, which has a rich history of public service and aristocracy. Its matriarch was Brazilian heroine Bárbara de Alencar, a prolific figure from Brazilian independence. She was the owner of vast lands in the Brazilian North East, which Alencar’s father, José Martiniano Pereira de Alencar, inherited. His father was Governor of the State of Ceará, as well as a very distinguished politician and Senator.

Alencar grew up in his father’s vast estate in Fortaleza, where he was trained as a soldier in the State Militia of Ceará like most aristocratic youths in the Brazilian Empire. Alencar pursued Law at the University of São Paulo, graduating in 1853. At São Paulo, he distinguished himself as a scholar and exhibited a keen interest in political and legal affairs.

=== Legal career ===
Upon completing his legal studies, Alencar embarked on a successful legal career. Known for his eloquence and legal acumen, he quickly gained recognition within legal circles and became a respected figure in the Brazilian legal community. Particularly in the local courts of Rio de Janeiro, where he moved after finishing his legal studies. Although he would mostly work as a diplomat from 1854 onwards, by the 1890s, after the fall of the Brazilian monarchy, Alencar had established himself a leading legalista in Imperial Brazil. According to one of his colleagues, João da Silva Carvalho, “his commitment to justice and the rule of law earned him several prestigious appointments, including as a judge of the Supreme Federal Court (a post he held between 1894 and 1898), where he made significant contributions to the development and refinement of the Brazilian legal system.”

== Diplomatic and political career ==
Alencar's diplomatic career began soon after his legal studies ended. Despite initially planning to join the legal bureaucracy of Brazil, he was appointed first class attaché in a diplomatic mission to Portugal in late 1854. He spent a year in the court of Portuguese King Pedro V, where he was a part of crucial commercial negotiations that softened the tense relations between the Rio de Janeiro and Lisbon. Between 1855 and 1857, Alencar was in the Austrian Court of Vienna. In 1857, Alencar returned to Brazil where he joined the personal retinue of Emperor Pedro II, whom he would befriend. That same years he was assigned secretary of the Brazilian diplomatic mission in Argentina. He was in Argentina until 1 December 1859.

On 5 April1861, the Emperor assigned him to be secretary of the Brazilian mission to Washington, D.C., hoping to establish cordial relations with the United States. He spent two years there, leaving his post on 30 May 1863 by order of the Brazilian Ministry of Foreign Affairs. Alencar was sent to Venezuela on 6 April 1865, where he served in Caracas as chargé d'affaires. On 9 March 1867 he was sent to Prussia, again occupying the post of secretary within the Brazilian embassy to the Prussian Kingdom. However, on 21 October 1867, he was suddenly removed from the Prussian mission and recalled to Brazil. He spent the following five years in the court of Emperor Pedro II of Brazil as a close friend, adviser, and confidant. Between 1869 and 1872 he represented the State of Amazonas in the Chamber of Deputies.

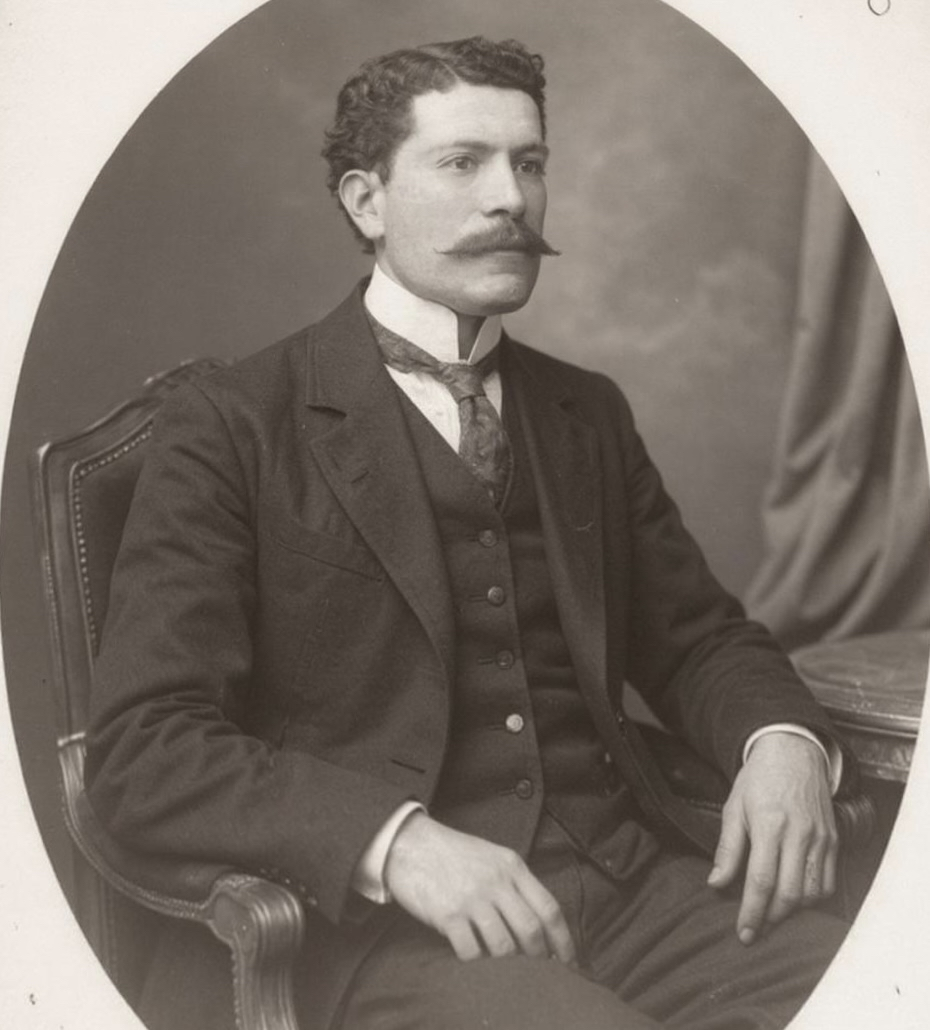
José Abel de Alencar Ayoroa, only son of the Baron of Alencar.

In the years 1867 and 1869, he was also significantly involved with the signing and ratificatiion of the Border Treaty of 1867 with Bolivia. Well received by Mariano Melgarejo, Alencar was encouraged to remain permanently in Bolivia and in charge of the Brazilian legation in La Paz. However, Alencar returned to Brazil in 1869 to run for the Legislative Elections of 1869. He was again appointed as chargé d'affaires on 11 March 1872, for a second time in Venezuela. Only a few months later on 3 July 1872 he returned to Bolivia as chargé d'affaires. Two years later on 21 May 1874 he was promoted to Resident Minister, and later to Minister Plenipotentiary. His term officially ended in 1882, however Alencar had left in 1881. In those ten years hespent in Bolivia, he maintained a relationship with Gregoria Eloísa Ayoroa Deheza, daughter of José Matías Ayoroa Valverde and Narcisa de la Deheza. She was a lady from a very wealthy and prominent family in La Paz, related to Mariano de Ayoroa. On 22 December 1879, acting as Resident Minister of His Majesty the Emperor of Brazil, he signed an agreement with Bolivia regulating the reciprocal execution of letters rogatory, which came into force on 15 October 1880.

In 1881, Alencar represented Brazil at the Congress of Private International Law in Montevideo, an important moment in the process of unification of law in Latin America. On 22 June 1881, Alencar processed in the name of Brazil, together with the Uruguay, the Question of Paso Hondo. From that date until 25 March 1890 he was Extraordinary Envoy and Minister Plenipotentiary to the Republics or Uruguay and Argentina combined. In the years 1885 and 1889 he was a signatory of two border treaties with Argentina. His diplomatic achievements further solidified his reputation as a key figure in shaping Brazil's foreign policy during the 19th century. He even became a key member of the council of the Emperor. On 7 March 1891 he was appointed Extraordinary Envoy and Minister Plenipotentiary to Spain, being relieved from this duty on 2 March 189.

=== Deputy for the State of Amazonas ===
In the time that he spent in Brazil between 1867 and 1872, Alencar was active in Brazil's political life. After the death of Joaquim José Inácio, Viscount of Inhaúma, the seat of the State of Amazonas in the Chamber of Deputies had been left vacant. After elections were held in August of the year 1869, Alencar was elected to represent Amazonas in the 14th Legislature of Brazil. He was elected with 81 out of 83 possible votes, a landslide victory. On 2 May 1870, despite having been interim deputy for almost a year, Alencar was officially made Inhaúma’s replacement.

=== Aristocratic title ===
By imperial decree on November 7, 1885, he received the title of Baron of Alencar, for his services in Brazilian foreign policy. This title symbolized not only his personal achievements but also the acknowledgment of his family's longstanding legacy of service to the Brazilian Empire.

== Legacy ==
The Baron of Alencar's legacy extends across the fields of politics, law, and diplomacy. His dedication to public service, his legal prowess, and his diplomatic achievements left an indelible mark on Brazil's history. His contributions are remembered as instrumental in shaping the legal and diplomatic foundations of the country during a crucial period of transition and growth. Namely in securing the Brazilian borders by signing numerous border with his nation’s neighbors. He is also remembered as having been a crucial figure in the life of his brother, the poet and writer José de Alencar, who influenced his own writing. The Baron’s works A sonambula de Ipojuca, published in 1861, and Bella: romance of Brazilian customs, published in 1893, are examples of his own writing talents.

== Personal life ==
Alencar was a bachelor for most of his youth, spending many years abroad. However, in the 1870s and 1880s, while in Bolivia, he met Gregoria Eloísa Ayoroa Deheza. They had one son:

- José Abel de Alencar Ayoroa; married twice and through his second wife, Tomasa Calderón de la Barca, is the father of Beatriz de Alencar Calderón de la Barca, wife of General Hernán Terrazas Céspedes.
