= Encarnação (novel) =

Novel by José de Alencar

Encarnação is a novel written by the Brazilian writer José de Alencar. It was first published, posthumously, in 1893.

See: Rebecca (novel): Plagiarism allegations.
