= O gaúcho =

1870 novel by José de Alencar

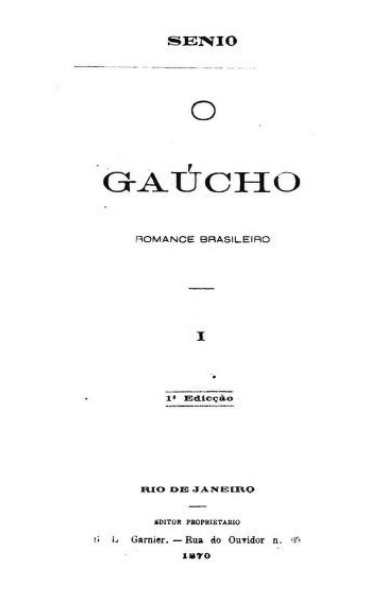
- Author: José de Alencar
- Language: Portuguese
- Publication date: 1870
- Publication place: Brazil

O gaúcho is a novel written by the Brazilian writer José de Alencar. Set in the Ragamuffin War, it was first published in 1870.
