= Ubirajara (novel) =

Novel by José de Alencar

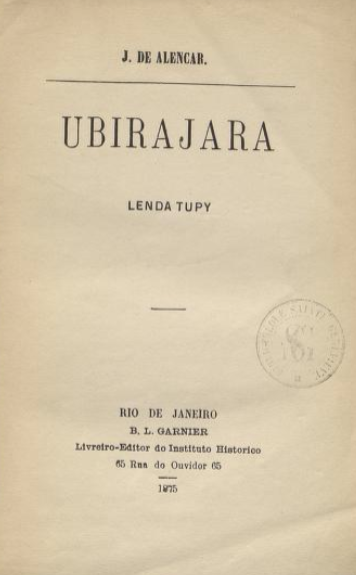
- Title page for Ubirajara (1875)
- Author: José de Alencar
- Language: Portuguese
- Published: 1874
- Publication place: Brazil
- Preceded by: Iracema
- Original text: Ubirajara at Portuguese Wikisource

Ubirajara is the final of the "Indianist" novels by José de Alencar. It was first published in 1874; the title refers to the name of the principal character, Ubirajara, a young warrior in the Araguaia tribe.
