= Five Minutes (novel) =

1856 Brazilian novel by José de Alencar

Five Minutes (Portuguese: Cinco Minutos) is the debut novel by Brazilian writer José de Alencar. It was initially published in serial form in the journal Diário do Rio de Janeiro, and was so popular that it was released as a book in 1856.

== Plot and setting ==
The book is written in the form of a letter, addressed to "D.", the narrator's cousin. It tells the story of the aforementioned narrator's love by a woman named Carlota, whose name is only given in the final chapters of the book.

The story begins in Rio de Janeiro City. The narrator, a man whose name is not given throughout the entire book, is late to take his bus, and misses it because of a five-minute delay (hence the book's name). Forced to take the next bus, he sits near a woman, falling in love with her at first sight, but he is not able to see her face because it is covered by a veil, and deduces she is ugly. Soon after, the woman leaves, mysteriously whispering in his ear "Non ti scordar di me" (Italian for "Do not forget me"); mesmerized, he tries to run after the woman, but loses her from sight. After one month trying to discover who she is, he finally finds her once again in a theatre, during a performance of Giuseppe Verdi's La traviata. He confesses his love for her, but she flees without saying a word, only leaving him a tear-soaked handkerchief.

After many other mishaps, the man finally finds her again and confesses once more; however, she ignores him. Later on, the man receives a letter from the woman via her old mother, where she says she has been observing him secretly for a long time, and actually loves him, but they would never be able to stay together because she has an incurable disease. In the same letter, she says she has left for Petrópolis and, on the following day, would leave to Europe alongside her mother. She asks the narrator to come to her if he wants to live his love.

The narrator leaves Brazil after a brief encounter with her in the Villegagnon Island, and searches for her everywhere, always finding a note from her in the places he visits. Finally finding her, they spend ten days in Europe. Nearly dying, the woman (whose name is now revealed to be Carlota) asks the narrator for a kiss, and after obtaining it, Carlota miraculously recovers from her disease. They marry and, after spending a year in Europe, return to Brazil and move to a farm in Minas Gerais.
