= José Martiniano Pereira de Alencar =

Brazilian politician, journalist and priest

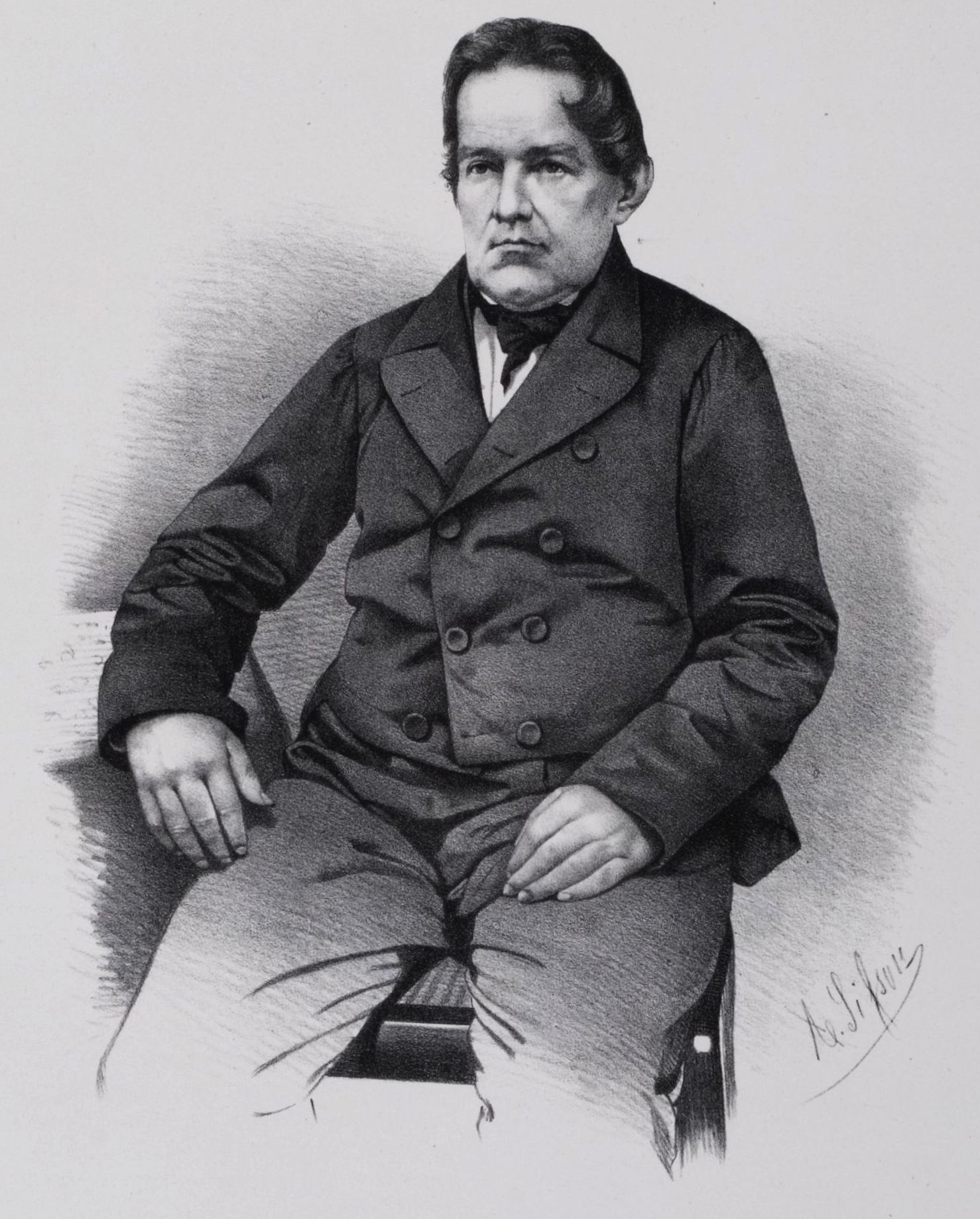
- José Martiniano Pereira de Alencar

Governor of Ceará
- In office October 6, 1834 – November 25, 1837
- Preceded by: Inácio Correia de Vasconcelos
- Succeeded by: João Facundo de Castro Meneses
- In office October 20, 1840 – April 6, 1841
- Preceded by: João Facundo de Castro Meneses
- Succeeded by: João Facundo de Castro Meneses

Personal details
- Born: 16 October 1794 Crato, Colonial Brazil
- Died: 15 March 1860 (aged 65) Rio de Janeiro, Empire of Brazil
- Domestic partner: Ana Josefina Pereira de Alencar
- Children: 7
- Parent(s): José Gonçalves dos Santos; Bárbara Pereira de Alencar
- Occupation: Politician, journalist, priest

José Martiniano Pereira de Alencar (16 October 1794 – 15 March 1860) was a Brazilian politician, journalist and priest, father of famous Brazilian novelist José de Alencar and diplomat Baron Leonel Martiniano de Alencar.

A member of the Pernambucan Revolt alongside his mother Bárbara Pereira de Alencar and brothers Tristão Gonçalves and Carlos José dos Santos, and a member of the Confederation of the Equator, he was senator of Ceará and later its governor, from 1834 to 1837, and again from 1840 to 1841.

== Biography ==
He was born in Crato on 16 October 1794, the son of Captain José Gonçalves dos Santos and Bárbara Pereira de Alencar. His parents were wealthy landowners who held significant properties in Ceará. He became a priest at a young age, likely when he was twenty. Along with his mother, Bárbara de Alencar, and his brothers, Tristão Gonçalves and Carlos José dos Santos, he took part in the 1817 revolution and the Confederation of Ecuador. He also played a crucial role in the Independence of Brazil. His participation in this event in favor of Pedro I of Brazil secured his political success and longevity for years to come.

He was made senator for the province of Ceará from 2 May 1832 until his death and, serving a lifetime term as senator. He was also President of the province of Ceará twice, from 6 October 1834 to 25 November 1837 and from 20 October 1840 to 6 April 1841. Before the First Brazilian Republic, Imperial Brazil was made up of provinces instead of states. These were governed by Presidents instead of Governors like in the current era. In 1834, he founded the Masonic Lodge "União e Beneficência" in Fortaleza.

His house, known in as the "Casa de José de Alencar" is a monument listed by the National Institute of Historic and Artistic Heritage. The place is located in the Messejana district of the municipality of Fortaleza and was the private residence of José de Alencar during the period in which he was president of the state.

== Issue ==
Even though he was a priest, he maintained an amorous relationship with his first cousin, Ana Josefina de Alencar. They would have the following children:

- José Martiniano de Alencar; married in 1864 to Georgiana Augusta da Gama Cochrane, with issue. A vastly influential politician and writer that remains an icon of Brazilian literature to this day.
- Leonel Martiniano de Alencar; never married but had at least four children with the Bolivian lady Gregoria Eloísa Ayoroa Deheza. Also an influential politician and diplomat who was ennobled by Pedro II of Brazil.
- Tristão de Alencar
- María de Alencar; married to José Collaço Brandão de Veras, with issue.
- Joaquina de Alencar; married in 1863 to Joaquim Bento de Sousa Andrade.
- Agustina de Alencar
- Carlos de Alencar; married several times with issue.

These were all acknowledged by the last will of José Martiniano Pereira de Alencar as his children with his cousin Ana Josefina de Alencar.
