= Ilka Soares =

Brazilian actress and model (1932–2022)

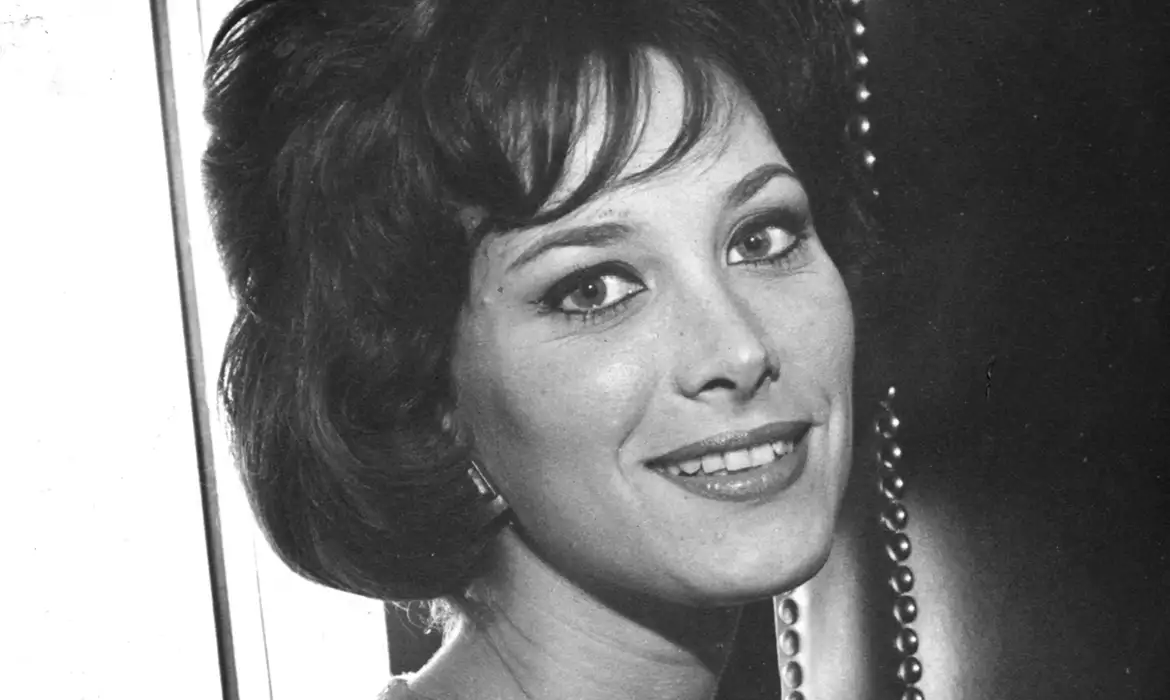
- Soares in 1964
- Born: 21 June 1932; Rio de Janeiro, Brazil
- Died: 18 June 2022 (aged 89); Rio de Janeiro, Brazil
- Occupations: Actress; model
- Years active: 1949–2013
- Spouses: Anselmo Duarte (m. 1952; div. 1956); Walter Clark (m. 1963; div. 1970); Nelson Fiúza Filho (m. 1979; div. 1982)
- Children: 3

Ilka Hack Soares (21 June 1932 – 18 June 2022) was a Brazilian actress and model. She appeared in the title role of the 1949 historical film Iracema. Shortly afterwards, she married Anselmo Duarte, and they became one of Brazil's leading celebrity couples.

== Personal life ==
=== Early life ===
She was born as Ilka Hack Soares in Rio de Janeiro on 21 June 1932.

=== Marriages and family ===
Soares was married three times and had three children.

She met Anselmo Duarte during the filming of Iracema, where the Brazilian actress played a title role, and married him shortly afterwards. During her marriage with Duarte between 1952 and 1956, with whom she had two children, they were celebrated as one of Brazil's leading celebrity couples.

=== Illness and death ===
Soares died in Rio de Janeiro at the age of 89. She had previously been hospitalized at São Vicente Clinic, and had been undergoing cancer treatment. Her death was confirmed by her grandson, who posted a tribute to his grandmother on his Instagram profile. l

== Selected filmography ==
The following is a list of selected feature films and TV series which Soares appeared in.

- Iracema (1949)
- O Cafona (1971)
- Anjo Mau (1976)
- Locomotivas (1977)
- Te Contei? (1978)
- Chega Mais (1980)
- Elas por Elas (1982)
- Louco Amor (1983)
- Champagne (1983–1984)
- Corpo a Corpo (1984)
- Mandala (1987)
- Que Rei Sou Eu? (1989)
- Top Model (1989)
- Rainha da Sucata (1990)
- Barriga de Aluguel (1990–1991)
- História de Amor (1995)
- Você Decide (1992–1998)
- A Diarista (2006)
- Mandrake (2005–2007)
