= Gino Talamo =

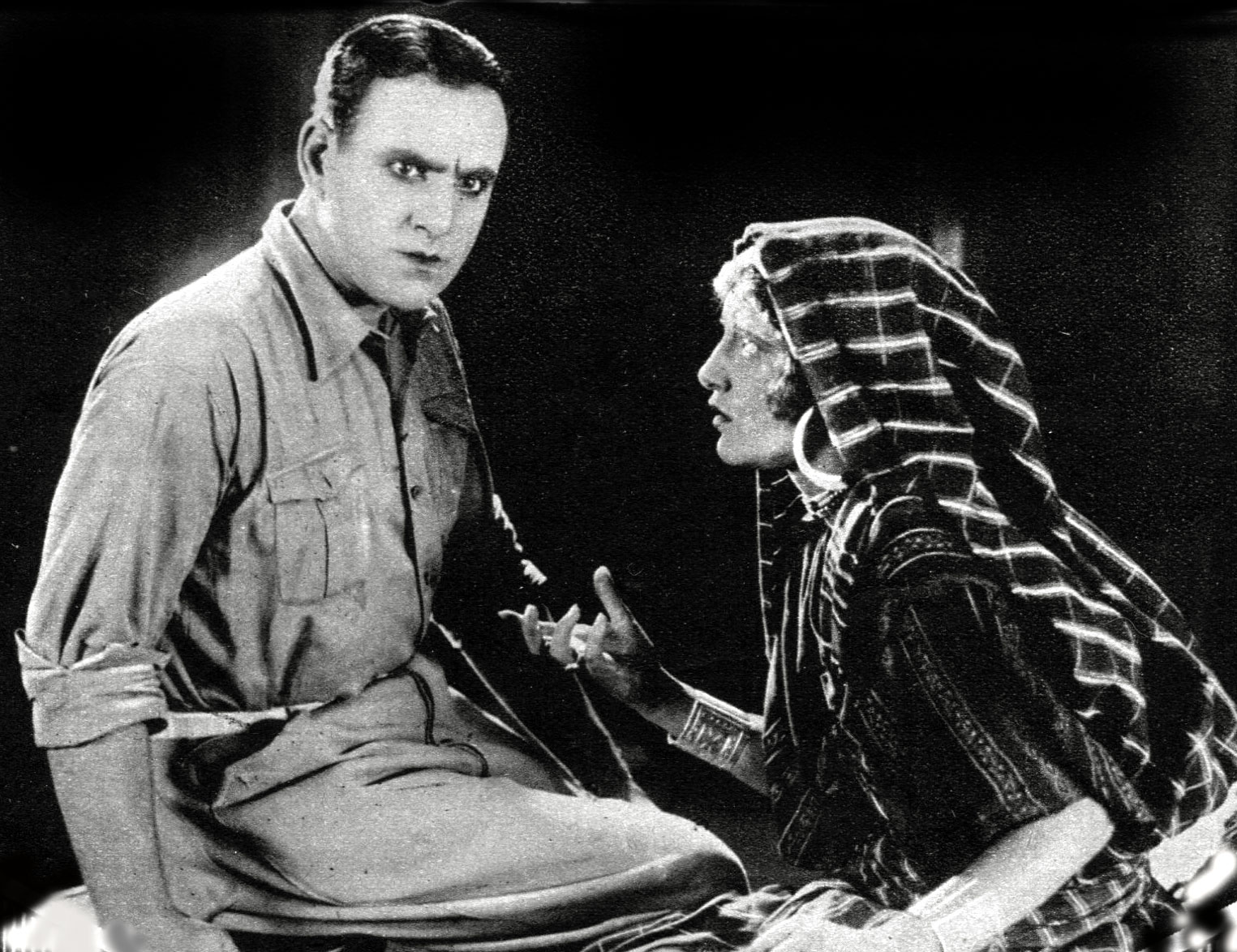
- Born: 13 December 1895; Taranto, Apulia, Italy
- Died: 9 July 1968 (aged 72); Rome, Lazio, Italy
- Other name: Luigi Talamo
- Occupations: Editor; Director; Actor
- Years active: 1919-1963

Gino Talamo (13 December 1895 – 9 July 1968) was an Italian actor, film editor and director. He directed the 1949 Brazilian film Iracema.

== Selected filmography ==
=== Actor ===
- Messalina (1924)
- Beatrice Cenci (1926)

=== Editor ===
- The Two Sergeants (1936)
- Doctor Antonio (1937)
- I've Lost My Husband! (1937)
- The Last Dance (1941)
- The Peddler and the Lady (1943)
- Romulus and the Sabines (1945)
- Farewell, My Beautiful Naples (1946)
- Lost in the Dark (1947)
- The Vow (1950)

=== Director ===
- Knights of the Desert (1942)
- Iracema (1949)

== Bibliography ==
- Sadlier, Darlene Joy (ed.) Latin American Melodrama: Passion, Pathos, and Entertainment. University of Illinois Press, 2009.
