= José de Alencar =

Brazilian writer, lawyer, and politician (1829–1877)

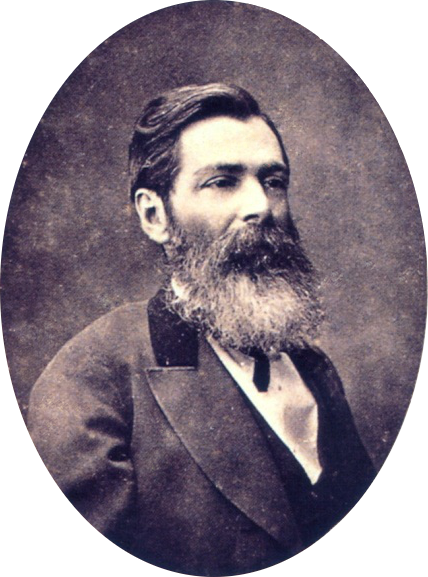
- José de Alencar, c. 1870

Secretary of State for Justice Affairs
- In office 16 July 1868 – 10 January 1870
- Monarch: Pedro II
- Prime Minister: Viscount of Itaboraí
- Preceded by: Martim Ribeiro de Andrada
- Succeeded by: Joaquim Otávio Nébias

General Deputy
- In office 1861–1870
- Constituency: Ceará

Personal details
- Born: José Martiniano de Alencar; 1 May 1829 Fortaleza, Ceará, Empire of Brazil
- Died: 12 December 1877 (aged 48) Rio de Janeiro, Neutral Municipality, Empire of Brazil
- Resting place: Cemitério de São João Batista, Rio de Janeiro, Brazil
- Party: Conservative
- Spouse: Georgiana Augusta Cochrane
- Children: 6, including Mário
- Relatives: José Martiniano de Alencar (father); The 1st Baron of Alencar (younger brother)
- Education: University of São Paulo
- Occupation: Lawyer, politician, orator, novelist, dramatist
- Writing career
- Pen name: Erasmo; Ig
- Notable works: O Guarani, Senhora, Lucíola, Iracema, Ubirajara
- Movement: Romanticism

José Martiniano de Alencar (1 May 1829 – 12 December 1877) was a Brazilian novelist, lawyer, politician, orator, and dramatist. He is considered to be one of the most famous and influential Brazilian Romantic novelists of the 19th century, and a major exponent of the literary tradition known as "Indianism". Sometimes he signed his works with the pen name Erasmo. He was patron of the 23rd chair of the Brazilian Academy of Letters.

== Biography ==
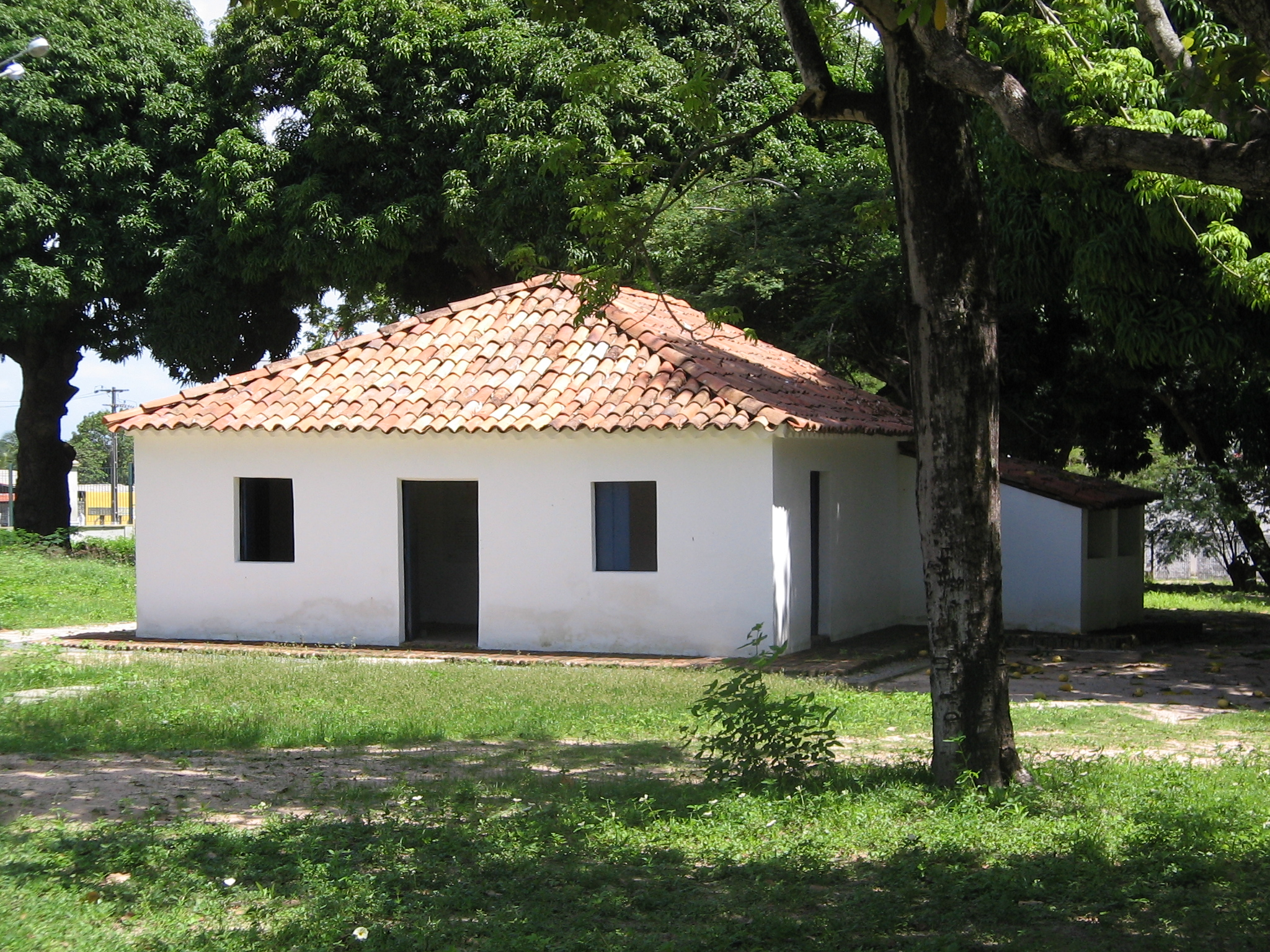
The house where José de Alencar was born and lived in until 1844, in the Messejana neighborhood, in Fortaleza

José Martiniano de Alencar was born in Messejana, Fortaleza, Ceará, on May 1, 1829, to politician José Martiniano Pereira de Alencar and his cousin Ana Josefina de Alencar. His family was a rich and influential clan in Northeastern Brazil, his grandmother being famous landowner Barbara Pereira de Alencar, heroine of the Pernambucan Revolution. Moving to São Paulo in 1844, he graduated in Law at the Faculdade de Direito da Universidade de São Paulo in 1850 and started his career in law in Rio de Janeiro. Invited by his friend Francisco Otaviano, he became a collaborator for the journal Correio Mercantil. He also wrote many chronicles for the Diário do Rio de Janeiro and the Jornal do Commercio. Alencar would compile all the chronicles he wrote for these newspapers in 1874, under the name Ao Correr da Pena.

It was in the Diário do Rio de Janeiro, during the year of 1856, that Alencar gained notoriety, writing the Cartas sobre A Confederação dos Tamoios, under the pseudonym Ig. In them, he bitterly criticized the homonymous poem by Gonçalves de Magalhães. Even the Brazilian Emperor Pedro II, who esteemed Magalhães very much, participated in this polemic, albeit under a pseudonym. Also in 1856, he wrote and published under feuilleton form his first romance, Cinco Minutos, that received critical acclaim. In the following year, his breakthrough novel, O Guarani, was released; it would be adapted into a famous opera by Brazilian composer Antônio Carlos Gomes 13 years later. O Guarani would be first novel of what is informally called Alencar's "Indianist Trilogy" – a series of three novels by Alencar that focused on the foundations of the Brazilian nation, and on its indigenous peoples and culture. The other two novels, Iracema and Ubirajara, would be published on 1865 and 1874, respectively. Although called a trilogy, the three books are unrelated in their plots.

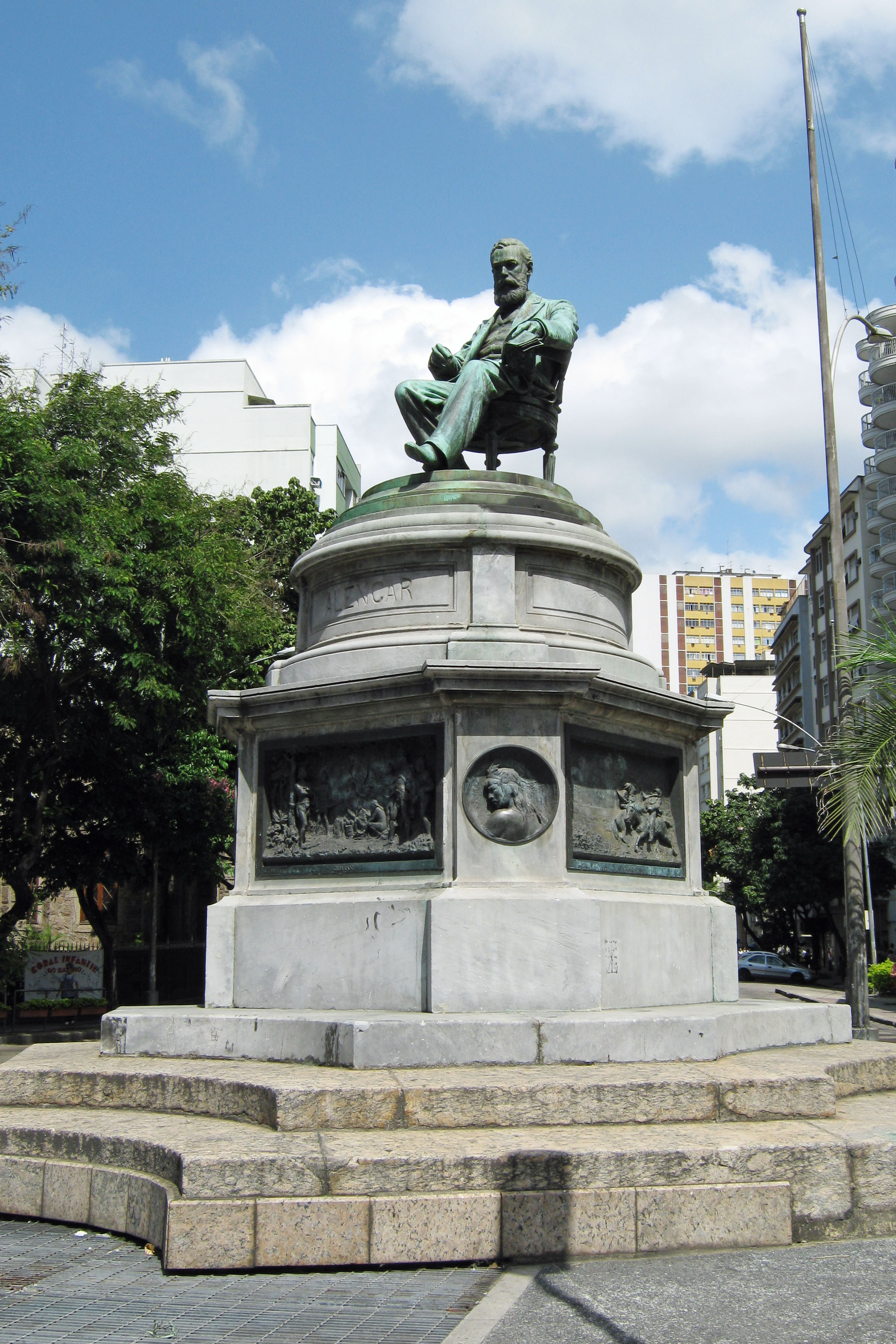
Monument to José de Alencar in Rio de Janeiro

Alencar was affiliated with the Conservative Party of Brazil, being elected as a general deputy for Ceará. He was the Brazilian Minister of Justice from 1868 to 1870, having famously opposed the abolition of slavery. He also planned to be a senator, but Pedro II never appointed him, under the pretext of Alencar being too young; with his feelings hurt, he would abandon politics later.

He was very close friends with the also famous writer Machado de Assis, who wrote an article in 1866 praising his novel Iracema, that was published the year before, comparing his Indianist works to Gonçalves Dias, saying that "Alencar was in prose what Dias was in poetry". When Assis founded the Brazilian Academy of Letters in 1897, he chose Alencar as the patron of his chair.

In 1864 he married Georgina Augusta Cochrane, daughter of an eccentric British aristocrat. They would have six children – Augusto (who would be the Brazilian Minister of External Relations in 1919, and also the Brazilian ambassador in the United States from 1920 to 1924), Clarisse, Ceci, Elisa, Mário (who would be a journalist and writer, and a member of the Brazilian Academy of Letters) and Adélia. (It is implied that Mário de Alencar was actually an illegitimate son of Machado de Assis, a fact that inspired Assis to write his famous novel Dom Casmurro.)

Alencar died in Rio de Janeiro on 12 December 1877, a victim of tuberculosis. A theatre in Fortaleza, the Theatro José de Alencar, was named after him. His works were marked by the influence of his Roman Catholic faith.

== Works ==
=== Novels ===
- Cinco Minutos (1856)
- A Viuvinha (1857)
- O Guarani (1857)
- Lucíola (1862)
- Diva (1864)
- Iracema (1865)
- As Minas de Prata (1865 — 1866)
- O Gaúcho (1870)
- A Pata da Gazela (1870)
- O Tronco do Ipê (1871)
- A Guerra dos Mascates (1871 — 1873)
- Til (1871)
- Sonhos d'Ouro (1872)
- Alfarrábios (1873)
- Ubirajara (1874)
- O Sertanejo (1875)
- Senhora (1875)
- Encarnação (1893 — posthumous)

=== Theatre plays ===
- O Crédito (1857)
- Verso e Reverso (1857)
- O Demônio Familiar (1857)
- As Asas de um Anjo (1858)
- Mãe (1860)
- A Expiação (1867)
- O Jesuíta (1875)

=== Chronicles ===
- Ao Correr da Pena (1874)

=== Autobiography ===
- Como e Por Que sou Romancista (1873)

=== Critics and polemics ===
- Cartas sobre A Confederação dos Tamoios (1856)
- Cartas Políticas de Erasmo (1865 — 1866)
- O Sistema Representativo (1866)

Political offices
Preceded by Martim Ribeiro de Andrada	Secretary of State for Justice Affairs; 1868–1870	Succeeded by Joaquim Otávio Nébias
