= 1983 in Brazil =

Events in the year 1983 in Brazil.

== Incumbents ==
=== Federal government ===
- President: General João Figueiredo
- Vice President: Aureliano Chaves

=== Governors ===
- Acre: Nabor Júnior
- Alagoas: Divaldo Suruagy
- Amazonas: Gilberto Mestrinho
- Bahia:
  - Antônio Carlos Magalhães (until 15 March)
  - João Durval Carneiro (from 15 March)
- Ceará:
  - Manuel de Castro (until 15 March)
  - Gonzaga Mota (from 15 March)
- Espírito Santo:
  - Eurico Vieira Resende (until 15 March)
  - Gerson Camata (from 15 March)
- Goiás:
  - Ary Valadão (until 15 March)
  - Iris Rezende (from 15 March)
- Maranhão:
  - Ivar Saldanha (until 15 March)
  - Luís Rocha (from 15 March)
- Mato Grosso:
  - Frederico Campos (until 15 March)
  - Júlio Campos (from 15 March)
- Mato Grosso do Sul:
  - Pedro Pedrossian (until 1 March)
  - Wilson Barbosa Martins (from 1 March)
- Minas Gerais:
  - Francelino Pereira (until 15 March)
  - Tancredo Neves (from 15 March)
- Pará:
  - Alacid Nunes (until 15 March)
  - Jader Barbalho (from 15 March)
- Paraíba:
  - Clóvis Cavalcanti (until 15 March)
  - Wilson Braga (from 15 March)
- Paraná:
  - José Hosken de Novaes
  - José Richa
- Pernambuco:
  - José Muniz Ramos (until 15 March)
  - Roberto Magalhães (from 15 March)
- Piauí:
  - Lucídio Portela (until 15 March)
  - Hugo Napoleão (from 15 March)
- Rio de Janeiro:
  - Antônio Chagas Freitas (until 15 March)
  - Leonel Brizola (from 15 March)
- Rio Grande do Norte:
  - Lavoisier Maia (until 15 March)
  - José Agripino Maia (from 15 March)
- Rio Grande do Sul:
  - José Augusto Amaral de Souza (until 15 March)
  - Jair de Oliveira Soares (from 15 March)
- Rondônia: Jorge Teixeira de Oliveira
- Santa Catarina:
  - Henrique Córdova (until 15 March)
  - Esperidião Amin (from 15 March)
- São Paulo:
  - José Maria Marin (until 15 March)
  - André Franco Montoro (from 15 March)
- Sergipe:
  - Djenal Queirós (until 15 March)
  - João Alves Filho (from 15 March)

=== Vice governors ===
- Acre:
  - José Fernandes Rego (until 15 March)
  - Iolanda Ferreira Lima Fleming (from 15 March)
- Alagoas: José de Medeiros Tavares (from 15 March)
- Amazonas: Manoel Henriques Ribeiro (from 15 March)
- Bahia:
  - Luis Viana Neto (until 15 March)
  - Edvaldo de Oliveira Flores (from 15 March)
- Ceará: José Adauto Bezerra (from 15 March)
- Espírito Santo:
  - José Carlos Fonseca (until 31 January)
  - José Moraes (from 15 March)
- Goiás:
  - Rui Brasil Cavalcanti (from 15 March)
  - Onofre Quinan (from 15 March)
- Maranhão: João Rodolfo Ribeiro Gonçalves (from 15 March)
- Mato Grosso:
  - José Vilanova Torres (until 15 March)
  - Wilmar Peres de Faria (from 15 March)
- Mato Grosso do Sul: Ramez Tebet (from 15 March)
- Minas Gerais:
  - João Marques de Vasconcelos (until 15 March)
  - Hélio Garcia (from 15 March)
- Pará:
  - Gerson dos Santos Peres (until 31 January)
  - Laércio Dias Franco (from 15 March)
- Paraíba: José Carlos da Silva Júnior (from 15 March)
- Paraná: João Elísio Ferraz de Campos (from 15 March)
- Pernambuco:
  - Waldemar de Castro Macedo (until 15 March)
  - Gustavo Krause Gonçalves Sobrinho (from 15 March)
- Piauí: José Raimundo Bona Medeiros
- Rio de Janeiro:
  - Hamilton Xavier (until 15 March)
  - Darcy Ribeiro (starting 15 March)
- Rio Grande do Norte:
  - Geraldo Melo (until 15 March)
  - Radir Pereira (from 15 March)
- Rio Grande do Sul:
  - Otávio Badui Germano (until 15 March)
  - Cláudio Ênio Strassburger (from 15 March)
- Santa Catarina:
  - Henrique Hélion Velho de Córdova (until 15 March)
  - Victor Fontana (from 15 March)
- São Paulo: Orestes Quércia (from 15 March)
- Sergipe: Antônio Carlos Valadares (from 15 March)

== Events ==
=== February ===
- February 18: The federal government decrees a maximum devaluation of the Cruzeiro, Brazil's monetary unit.

=== March ===
- March 13: The 1983 Brazilian Grand Prix is held at Jacarepaguá and is won by Brazil's Nelson Piquet.
- March 15: The first 22 directly elected governors take office, since the 1964 military coup.

=== June ===
- June 5: Rede Manchete is founded in São Paulo.

=== July ===
- July 24-August 6: The 1983 FIBA World Basketball Championship for Women is hosted by Brazil. It is won by the Soviet Union.

=== August ===
- August 28: The creation of the Central Única dos Trabalhadores (CUT) is approved by the 1st National Congress of the Working Class, held in São Bernardo do Campo, São Paulo.

=== October ===
- October 24: Italian mafia boss Tommaso Buscetta, considered one of the biggest drug traffickers in the world, is arrested by the Federal Police in São Paulo.

=== December ===
- December 20: The original Jules Rimet Trophy, awarded to Brazil in 1970, is stolen in Rio de Janeiro; it has never been recovered.

== Births ==
=== January ===
- January 2: Jefferson, footballer
- January 12: Prince Pedro Luiz of Orléans-Braganza (died 2009)
- January 13: Bill Hudson, Brazilian-American musician
- January 28: Sandy, singer

=== April ===
- April 15: Alice Braga, actress

=== May ===
- May 6: Dani Alves, footballer

=== August ===
- August 11: Tatá Werneck, actress
- August 15: Jancarlos de Oliveira Barros, footballer (died 2013)
- August 31: Maria Flor, actress

=== October ===
- October 3: Fred, footballer
- October 15: Bruno Senna, racing driver

=== December ===
- December 31: Jaqueline Carvalho, volleyball player

== Deaths ==
=== January ===
- January 20: Garrincha, footballer (b. 1933)
- January 23: Marcolino Gomes Candau, medical doctor and 2nd Director-General of World Health Organization (b. 1911)

=== April ===
- April 2: Clara Nunes, singer (b. 1942)

=== October ===
- October 5: Humberto Mauro, film director (b. 1897)
- October 28: Romeu Italo Ripoli, agronomist and president of the Esporte Clube XV de Novembro (Piracicaba) (b. 1916)

== See also ==
- Brazilian football
- 1983 in Brazilian television
- List of Brazilian films of 1983
