= 1908 in Brazil =

Events in the year 1908 in Brazil.

== Incumbents ==
=== Federal government ===
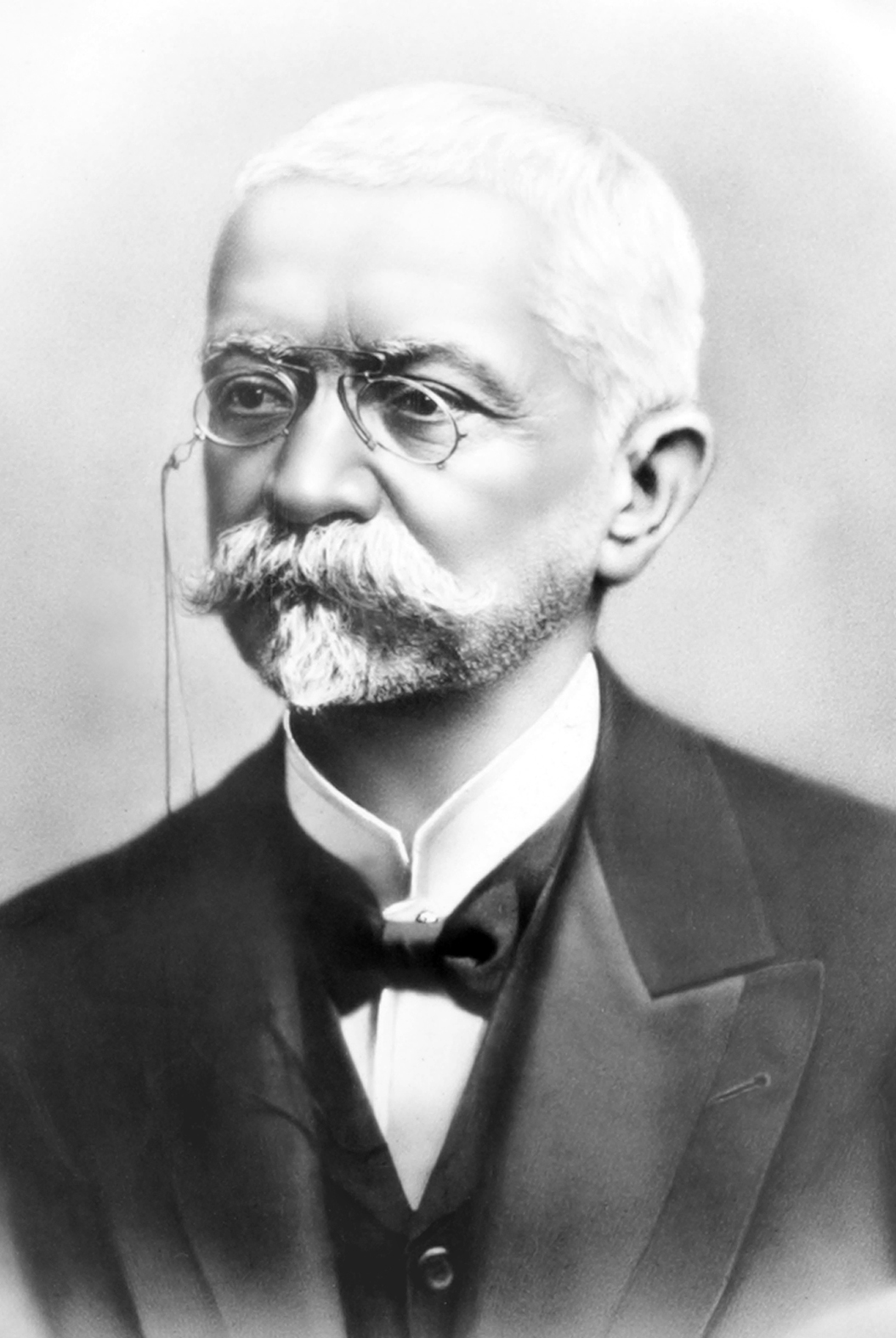
Afonso Pena, President

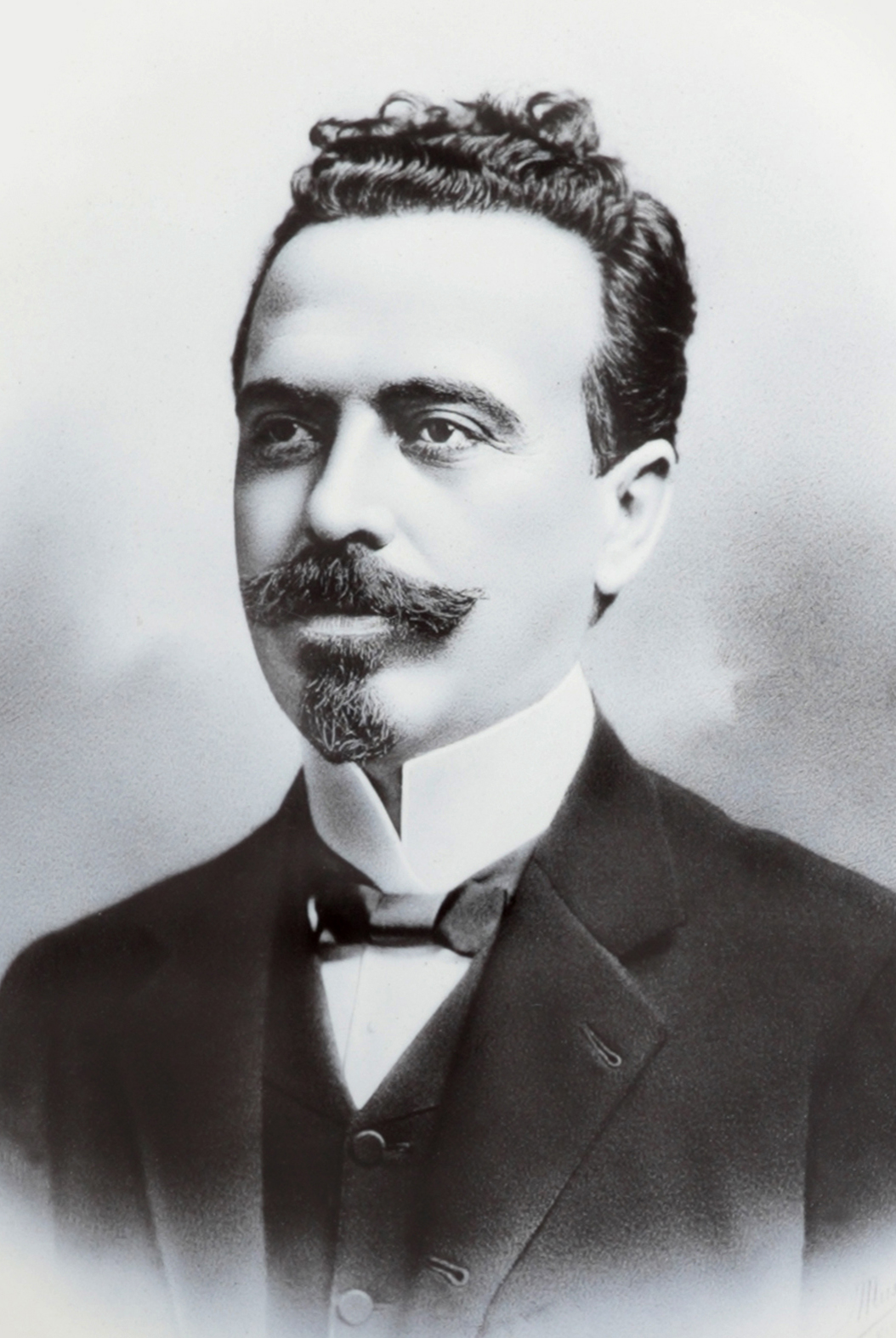
Nilo Peçanha, Vice President

- President: Afonso Pena
- Vice President: Nilo Peçanha

=== Governors ===
- Alagoas: Euclid Vieira Malta
- Amazonas: Antônio Constantino Néri (till 23 July); Antônio Clemente Ribeiro Bittencourt (from 23 July)
- Bahia: José Marcelino de Sousa, then João Ferreira de Araújo Pinho
- Ceará: Antônio Nogueira Accioli (till 12 July); Antônio Nogueira Accioli (from 12 July)
- Goiás: Miguel da Rocha Lima
- Maranhão: Benedito Pereira Leite (till 25 May); Arthur Collares (from 25 May)
- Mato Grosso: Generoso Pais Leme de Sousa Ponce, then Pedro Celestino Corrêa da Costa
- Minas Gerais: João Pinheiro da Silva (till 25 October); Júlio Bueno Brandão (from 27 October)
- Pará: Augusto Montenegro
- Paraíba: Valfredo Leal (till 28 October); João Lopes Machado (from 28 October)
- Paraná: Joaquim Monteiro de Carvalho e Silva; Manuel de Alencar Guimarães; Francisco Xavier da Silva
- Pernambuco: Sigismundo Antônio Gonçalves (till 7 April); Herculano Bandeira de Melo (from 7 April)
- Piauí: Areolino Antônio de Abreu (till 31 March); José Lourenço de Morais e Silva (31 March - 1 July); Anísio Auto de Abreu (from 1 July)
- Rio Grande do Norte: Antonio José de Melo e Sousa (till 25 March); Alberto Maranhão (from 25 March)
- Rio Grande do Sul: Antônio Augusto Borges de Medeiros (till 25 January); Carlos Barbosa Gonçalves (from 25 January)
- Santa Catarina:
- São Paulo:
- Sergipe:

=== Vice governors ===
- Rio Grande do Norte:
- São Paulo:

== Events ==
- 23 May - Jerônimo de Sousa Monteiro becomes the 13th president (governor) of the state of Espírito Santo.

=== June ===
- 16 June: The Kasato Maru arrives at the Port of Santos with the first official group of Japanese immigrants to Brazil.
- 2 July - The Argentina national football team begins a tour of Brazil, winning six and drawing one of the seven friendly games played in 13 days.
- 11 August - 15 November - The Exhibition of the centenary of the opening of the Ports of Brazil was held in Urca, Rio de Janeiro.
- 10 September - The first Minas Geraes-class Dreadnought battleship for Brazil, Minas Geraes, is launched at Armstrong Whitworth's yard on the River Tyne in England, catalysing the "South American dreadnought race".
- 30 October - Pedro de Alcântara, Prince of Grão-Pará, renounces his claim on the Brazilian throne in order to marry Countess Elisabeth Dobržensky de Dobrženicz.
- 15 November - The emergence of Umbanda through Zélio Fernandino de Moraes.

== Births ==
- 3 February - Dulcina de Moraes, stage actress and director (died 1996)
- 12 February - Olga Benário Prestes, German-Brazilian communist militant (in Munich; died 1942)
- 8 June - Inah Canabarro Lucas, supercentenarian and nun (died 2025)
- 27 June - João Guimarães Rosa, novelist (died 1967)
- 5 September - Josué de Castro, activist (died 1973)
- 14 September - Maria Luisa Monteiro da Cunha, librarian (died 1980)
- 25 October - Blessed Adílio Daronch, student (died 1924)
- 28 November - Vitorino de Brito Freire, politician (died 1977)
- 13 December - Plinio Corrêa de Oliveira, Catholic intellectual and politician (died 1995)

== Deaths ==
- 29 September - Joaquim Maria Machado de Assis, novelist, poet, playwright, short story writer, and monarchist (born 1839)
- 22 October - Artur Azevedo, dramatist, short story writer, chronicler, journalist and poet of the Parnassian school (born 1855)

== See also ==
- 1908 in Brazilian football
