= 1986 in Brazil =

Events in the year 1986 in Brazil.

== Incumbents ==
=== Federal government ===
- President: José Sarney
- Vice President: Vacant

=== Governors ===
- Acre:
  - Nabor Júnior (until 15 March)
  - Iolanda Fleming (from 15 March)
- Alagoas:
  - Divaldo Suruagy (till 14 May)
  - José de Medeiros Tavares (from 14 May)
- Amazonas: Gilberto Mestrinho
- Bahia: João Durval Carneiro
- Ceará: Gonzaga Mota
- Espírito Santo:
  - Gerson Camata (until 14 May)
  - José Moraes (from 14 May)
- Goiás:
  - Iris Rezende (till 13 February)
  - Onofre Quinan (from 13 February)
- Maranhão: Luís Rocha
- Mato Grosso:
  - Júlio Campos (until 15 May)
  - Wilmar Peres de Faria (from 15 May)
- Mato Grosso do Sul:
  - Wilson Barbosa Martins (until 14 March)
  - Ramez Tebet (from 14 March)
- Minas Gerais: Hélio Garcia
- Pará: Jader Barbalho
- Paraíba:
  - Wilson Braga (until 14 May)
  - Rivando Cavalcanti (15 May-14 June)
  - Milton Bezerra Cabral (from 15 June)
- Paraná:
  - José Richa (until 9 May)
  - João Elísio Ferraz de Campos (from 9 May)
- Pernambuco:
  - Roberto Magalhães (until 14 May)
  - Gustavo Krause (from 14 May)
- Piauí:
  - Hugo Napoleão (until 14 May)
  - Bona Medeiros (from 14 May)
- Rio de Janeiro: Leonel Brizola
- Rio Grande do Norte:
  - José Agripino Maia (until 15 May)
  - Radir Pereira de Araujo (from 15 March)
- Rio Grande do Sul: Jair de Oliveira Soares
- Rondônia: Ângelo Angelin
- Santa Catarina: Esperidião Amin
- São Paulo: André Franco Montoro
- Sergipe: João Alves Filho

=== Vice governors ===
- Acre:
  - Iolanda Ferreira Lima Fleming (until 14 May)
  - Vacant thereafter (from 14 May)
- Alagoas:
  - José de Medeiros Tavares (until 14 May)
  - Vacant thereafter (from 14 May)
- Amazonas:
  - Manoel Henriques Ribeiro (until 1 January)
  - Vacant thereafter (from 1 January)
- Bahia: Edvaldo de Oliveira Flores
- Ceará: José Adauto Bezerra
- Espírito Santo:
  - José Moraes (until 14 May)
  - Vacant thereafter (from 14 May)
- Goiás:
  - Onofre Quinan (from 14 February)
  - Vacant thereafter (from 14 February)
- Maranhão: João Rodolfo Ribeiro Gonçalves
- Mato Grosso:
  - Wilmar Peres de Faria (until 14 May)
  - Vacant thereafter (from 14 May)
- Mato Grosso do Sul:
  - Ramez Tebet (until 14 May)
  - Vacant thereafter (from 14 May)
- Minas Gerais: Vacant
- Pará: Laércio Dias Franco
- Paraíba:
  - José Carlos da Silva Júnior (until 14 May)
  - Vacant thereafter (from 14 May)
- Paraná:
  - João Elísio Ferraz de Campos (until 14 May)
  - Vacant thereafter (from 14 May)
- Pernambuco:
  - Gustavo Krause Gonçalves Sobrinho (until 14 May)
  - Vacant thereafter (from 14 May)
- Piauí:
  - José Raimundo Bona Medeiros (until 14 May)
  - Vacant thereafter (from 14 May)
- Rio de Janeiro: Darcy Ribeiro
- Rio Grande do Norte:
  - Radir Pereira (until 14 May)
  - Vacant thereafter (from 14 May)
- Rio Grande do Sul: Cláudio Ênio Strassburger
- Santa Catarina: Victor Fontana
- São Paulo:
  - Orestes Quércia (until 30 March)
  - Vacant (from 30 March)
- Sergipe: Antônio Carlos Valadares

== Events ==
=== January ===
- January 16: Octávio Pinto Guimarães is elected president of the CBF, after being supported and financed by mobster Castor de Andrade.

=== February ===
- February 28: The Cruzado Plan, an economic plan that establishes a price freeze, is launched. The Brazilian currency is now called the Cruzado, which is equivalent to one thousand Cruzeiros.

=== March ===
- March 28: The second Brazilian communications satellite, Brasilsat A2, is launched by a European Ariane 3 rocket from the Kourou launch base in French Guiana.

=== April ===
- April 16: The National Congress of Brazil approves the Cruzado Plan, also known as the Economic Stabilization Plan.

=== June ===
- June 30: Xou da Xuxa begins on TV Globo.

=== July ===
- July 29: Brazilian President José Sarney and Argentine President Raúl Alfonsín sign economic agreements in Buenos Aires for mutual integration; the basis for the future creation of the Southern Common Market (Mercosur).

=== October ===
- October 31: The Volkswagen Beetle ceased to be produced after 30 years of commercialization and 23 years of leadership in the Brazilian market; where 3 million and 300 thousand units were commercialized.

=== November ===
- November 15: General elections are held for governors, senators, federal and state deputies.
- November 30: An earthquake measuring 5.3 on the Richter Scale hits the municipality of João Câmara, Rio Grande do Norte.

=== December ===
- December 18: The Rio Group (G-Rio) is created in Rio de Janeiro, with the purpose of creating a better political relationship among Latin America and Caribbean states.

== Births ==
=== February ===
- February 19: Marta, footballer

=== April ===
- April 1: Hugo Pessanha, judoka
- April 29: Monique Alfradique, actress

=== June ===
- June 15: Cezar Bononi, professional wrestler

=== July ===
- July 25: Hulk, footballer

=== August ===
- August 10: Jucemar Gaucho, footballer
- August 21: Caio Narcio, politician and social scientist (died 2020)
- August 24: Fabiano Santacroce, Brazilian-born Italian footballer

== Deaths ==
- February 19: Francisco Mignone, classical music composer (b. 1897)

== See also ==
- 1986 in Brazilian football
- 1986 in Brazilian television
