= 1980 in Brazil =

Events in the year 1980 in Brazil.

== Incumbents ==
=== Federal government ===
- President: General João Figueiredo
- Vice President: Aureliano Chaves

=== Governors ===
- Acre: Vacant
- Alagoas: Guilherme Palmeira
- Amazonas: José Bernardino Lindoso
- Bahia: Antônio Carlos Magalhães
- Ceará: Virgílio Távora
- Espírito Santo: Eurico Vieira Resende
- Goiás: Ary Valadão
- Maranhão: João Castelo
- Mato Grosso: Frederico Campos
- Mato Grosso do Sul:
  - Marcelo Miranda Soares (until 29 October)
  - Pedro Pedrossian (from 29 October)
- Minas Gerais: Francelino Pereira
- Pará: Alacid Nunes
- Paraíba: Tarcísio Burity
- Paraná: Nei Braga
- Pernambuco: Marco Maciel
- Piauí: Lucídio Portela
- Rio de Janeiro: Antônio Chagas Freitas
- Rio Grande do Norte: Lavoisier Maia
- Rio Grande do Sul: José Augusto Amaral de Souza
- Santa Catarina: Jorge Bornhausen
- São Paulo: Paulo Maluf
- Sergipe: Augusto Franco

=== Vice governors ===
- Acre: José Fernandes Rego
- Alagoas: Teobaldo Vasconcelos Barbosa
- Amazonas: Paulo Pinto Nery
- Bahia: Luis Viana Neto
- Ceará: Manuel de Castro Filho
- Espírito Santo: José Carlos Fonseca
- Goiás: Rui Brasil Cavalcanti
- Maranhão: Artur Teixeira de Carvalho
- Mato Grosso: José Vilanova Torres
- Mato Grosso do Sul: Vacant
- Minas Gerais: João Marques de Vasconcelos
- Pará: Gerson dos Santos Peres
- Paraíba: Clóvis Cavalcanti
- Paraná: José Hosken de Novaes
- Pernambuco: Roberto Magalhães Melo
- Piauí: Waldemar de Castro Macedo
- Rio de Janeiro: Hamilton Xavier
- Rio Grande do Norte: Geraldo Melo
- Rio Grande do Sul: Otávio Badui Germano
- Santa Catarina: Henrique Hélion Velho de Córdova
- São Paulo: José Maria Marin
- Sergipe: Djenal Tavares Queiroz

== Events ==
=== April ===
- April 12: A Transbrasil Boeing 727 crashes in Florianópolis, Santa Catarina, killing 54 people.

=== June ===
- June 1: Mauro Milhomem, a Brazilian pilot, attempted to crash his Sertanejo-721 into the Hotel Presidente, owned by his mother-in-law, after he had an argument with his wife the previous day due to her cheating on him. The plane failed to hit the target and hit instead into several other objects, ultimately crashing into an accounting office in front of a forum. Six people were killed and four were wounded.
- June 30: Pope John Paul II arrives in Brazil for the first time with his twelve-day visit.

=== July ===
- July 9: On the 10th day of Pope John Paul II's visit to Brazil, in an effort to get good seats, the crowd at the Castelao Stadium broke down an unguarded gate and trampled those killed in the rush.

=== August ===
- August 11: Construction of the São Paulo/Guarulhos International Airport begins.

=== November ===
- November 13: The National Congress of Brazil unanimously approves the constitutional amendment that reestablishes direct elections for the governors of the States and the Federal District.

== Births ==
=== February ===
- February 25 – Fernando Santos, footballer

=== March ===
- March 21 – Ronaldinho, footballer

=== April ===
- April 5 –
  - Carolina Moraes, synchronized swimmer
  - Isabela Moraes, synchronized swimmer

=== May ===
- May 6 – Ricardo Oliveira, footballer
- May 20 – Cauã Reymond, actor

=== July ===
- July 20 –
  - Gisele Bündchen, model
  - Dado Dolabella, actor

=== August ===
- August 16 – Raniere Silva dos Santos, footballer

=== September ===
- September 20 – Samanda de Lula, politician

=== October ===
- October 2 – Henry Bugalho, YouTuber, writer, translator and philosopher

=== November ===
- November 8 – Luis Fabiano, footballer

== Deaths ==
=== March ===
- March 22 – Hélio Oiticica, artist (born 1937)

=== June ===
- June 7 – Adalgisa Nery, poet and politician (born 1905)

=== July ===
- July 9 – Vinicius de Moraes, poet and dramatist (born 1913)

=== December ===
- December 21 – Nelson Rodrigues, journalist, novelist and playwright (born 1912)

== See also ==
- 1980 in Brazilian football
- 1980 in Brazilian television
- List of Brazilian films of 1980
