= 1989 in Brazil =

The following lists events that happened in the year 1989 in Brazil.

== Incumbents ==
=== Federal government ===
- President: José Sarney
- Vice President: vacant

=== Governors ===
- Acre:
  - Flaviano Melo (until 2 March)
  - Édison Simão Cadaxo (from 2 March)
- Alagoas:
  - Fernando Collor de Mello (until 14 May)
  - Moacir Andrade (from 14 May)
- Amazonas: Amazonino Mendes
- Bahia:
  - Waldir Pires (until 14 May)
  - Nilo Moraes Coelho (from 14 May)
- Ceará: Tasso Jereissati
- Espírito Santo: Max Freitas Mauro
- Goiás: Henrique Santillo
- Maranhão: Epitácio Cafeteira
- Mato Grosso: Carlos Bezerra
- Mato Grosso do Sul: Marcelo Miranda Soares
- Minas Gerais: Newton Cardoso
- Pará: Hélio Gueiros
- Paraíba: Tarcísio Burity
- Paraná: Alvaro Dias
- Pernambuco: Miguel Arraes
- Piauí: Alberto Silva
- Rio Grande do Norte: Geraldo José Ferreira de Melo
- Rio de Janeiro: Moreira Franco
- Rio Grande do Sul: Pedro Simon
- Rondônia: Jerônimo Garcia de Santana
- Roraima: Romero Jucá
- Santa Catarina: Pedro Ivo Campos
- São Paulo: Orestes Quércia
- Sergipe: Antônio Carlos Valadares
- Tocantins: José Wilson Siqueira Campos (from 1 January)

=== Vice governors ===
- Acre: Edison Simão Cadaxo
- Alagoas:
  - Moacir Andrade (until 14 May)
  - Vacant thereafter (from 14 May)
- Amazonas: Vivaldo Barros Frota
- Bahia:
  - Nilo Moraes Coelho (until 14 May)
  - Vacant thereafter (from 14 May)
- Ceará: Francisco Castelo de Castro
- Espírito Santo: Carlos Alberto Batista da Cunha
- Goiás: Joaquim Domingos Roriz
- Maranhão: João Alberto Souza
- Mato Grosso: Edison de Oliveira
- Mato Grosso do Sul: George Takimoto
- Minas Gerais: Júnia Marise de Azeredo Coutinho
- Pará: Hermínio Calvinho Filho
- Paraíba: Vacant
- Paraná: Ary Veloso Queiroz
- Pernambuco: Carlos Wilson Rocha de Queirós Campos
- Piauí: Lucídio Portela Nunes
- Rio de Janeiro: Francisco Amaral
- Rio Grande do Norte: Garibaldi Alves
- Rio Grande do Sul: Sinval Sebastião Duarte Guazzelli
- Rondônia: Orestes Muniz Filho
- Santa Catarina: Casildo João Maldaner
- São Paulo: Almino Afonso
- Sergipe: Benedito de Figueiredo
- Tocantins: Darci Martins Coelho

== Events ==
=== January ===
- January 1: Tocantins, Brazil's 25th state, is established.
- January 15: Minister of Finance Maílson da Nóbrega launches Plano Verão and a new currency in the country, the Cruzado Novo (NCz$), which is equivalent to 1,000 Cruzados.

=== March ===
- March 18: The Memorial da América Latina is inaugurated in São Paulo. It's an architectural project by Oscar Niemeyer with the concept and cultural project developed by the anthropologist Darcy Ribeiro.

=== May ===
- May 8: The secretary general of Itamaraty, Paulo Tarso Flecha de Lima, signs a document at the Vietnamese embassy in Havana, Cuba, establishing diplomatic relations with Vietnam.
- May 20: Palmas, capital of the state of Tocantins, is founded.

=== July ===
- July 16: Brazil defeats Uruguay 1-0, to win their fourth Copa America trophy. This is the first championship won by Brazil since the 1970 FIFA World Cup.

=== September ===
- September 3: Varig Flight 254 crashes in the Amazon rainforest, near São José do Xingu, in Serra do Cachimbo. Of the 54 passengers and crew members, 12 died and many more sustained serious injuries.

=== November ===
- November 15: In the centenary of the Proclamation of the Republic, Brazil holds its first democratic presidential elections since 1960, following the military regime (1964–85).
- November 16: Fernando Collor de Mello and Luiz Inácio Lula da Silva advance to the second round of the presidential election.

=== December ===
- December 17:
  - The second round of the elections is disputed between Fernando Collor and Luiz Inácio Lula da Silva. Collor wins with 53% of the votes.
  - The kidnappers of Brazilian businessman Abilio Diniz surrender and free him in the south zone of São Paulo.

== Births ==
=== January ===
- January 18: Marcelo Demoliner, tennis player

=== February ===
- February 13: Rodrigo Possebon, footballer

=== April ===
- April 10: Éverton Ribeiro, footballer

=== June ===
- June 11:
  - Ana Clara Duarte, tennis player
  - Fagner, footballer

=== July ===
- July 28: Felipe Kitadai, judoka

=== September ===
- September 2: Alexandre Pato, footballer
- September 18: Ramon Abatti, FIFA football referee

=== October ===
- October 12: Paulo Henrique Ganso, footballer

== Deaths ==
=== January ===
- January 6: Elisa Lispector, novelist (b. 1911)

=== March ===
- March 20: Dina Sfat, actress (b. 1938)

=== June ===
- June 7: Nara Leão, singer (b. 1942)

=== August ===
- August 2: Luiz Gonzaga, singer (b. 1912)
- August 21: Raul Seixas, singer (b. 1945)
- August 27: Luiz Luz, footballer (b. 1909)

== See also ==
- 1989 in Brazilian football
- 1989 in Brazilian television
