= 1977 in Brazil =

Events in the year 1977 in Brazil.

== Incumbents ==
=== Federal government ===
- President: General Ernesto Geisel
- Vice President: General Adalberto Pereira dos Santos

=== Governors ===
- Acre: Vacant
- Alagoas: Divaldo Suruagy
- Amazonas: Henoch da Silva Reis
- Bahia: Roberto Santos
- Ceará: José Adauto Bezerra
- Espírito Santo: Élcio Álvares
- Goiás: Irapuan Costa Jr.
- Maranhão: Oswaldo da Costa Nunes Freire
- Mato Grosso: Jose Garcia Neto
- Mato Grosso do Sul: Vacant
- Minas Gerais: Aureliano Chaves
- Pará: Aloysio Chaves
- Paraíba: Ivan Bichara
- Paraná: Jaime Canet Júnior
- Pernambuco: Francisco Moura Cavalcanti
- Piauí: Dirceu Arcoverde
- Rio de Janeiro: Floriano P. Faria Lima
- Rio Grande do Norte: Tarcisio de Vasconcelos Maia
- Rio Grande do Sul: Sinval Sebastião Duarte Guazzelli
- Santa Catarina: Antônio Carlos Konder Reis
- São Paulo: Paulo Egídio Martins
- Sergipe: José Rollemberg

=== Vice governors ===
- Acre: Omar Sabino de Paula
- Alagoas: Vacant
- Amazonas: João Bosco Ramos de Lima
- Bahia: Edvaldo Brandão Correia
- Ceará: José Waldemar de Alcântara e Silva
- Espírito Santo: Carlos Alberto Lindenberg von Schilgen
- Goiás: José Luís Bittencourt
- Maranhão: José Duailibe Murad
- Mato Grosso: Cássio Leite de Barros
- Mato Grosso do Sul: Vacant
- Minas Gerais: Levindo Ozanam Coelho
- Pará: Clovis Silva de Morais Rego
- Paraíba: Dorgival Terceiro Neto
- Paraná: Octávio Cesário Pereira Júnior
- Pernambuco: Paulo Gustavo de Araújo Cunha
- Piauí: Djalma Martins Veloso
- Rio de Janeiro: Vacant
- Rio Grande do Norte: Geraldo Melo
- Rio Grande do Sul: José Augusto Amaral de Sousa
- Santa Catarina: Marcos Henrique Büechler
- São Paulo: Ferreira Filho
- Sergipe: Antônio Ribeiro Sotelo

== Events ==
=== April ===
- April 1: President Ernesto Geisel closes the National Congress of Brazil to control presidential succession as conflict erupts between him, the duristas, Congress, the Church, and the media.
- April 14: President Geisel signs constitutional amendment n°8 and reopens the National Congress of Brazil.

=== June ===
- June 23: In a second ballot by 226 votes in favor and 159 against; the National Congress of Brazil approves a constitutional amendment by Senators Nelson Carneiro and Acioli Filho, that legalizes divorce.

=== August ===
- August 3: Writer Rachel de Queiroz becomes the first woman elected to the Brazilian Academy of Letters.
- August 17: Jorge Amado's novel Tieta do Agreste is published, which becomes one of his best-selling works.

=== October ===
- October 1: Pelé, playing for the New York Cosmos, scores his last goal to defeat Santos FC 2-1, at Giants Stadium, in East Rutherford, New Jersey, United States. This would be his last official game, thus saying goodbye to his professional football career.
- October 11: President Ernesto Geisel signs a law, creating the state of Mato Grosso do Sul.

=== December ===
- December 26: President Ernesto Geisel signs a law that legalizes and regulates divorce.

== Births ==
=== March ===
- 27 March: Vítor Meira race car driver

=== April ===
- 1 April: Vitor Belfort, MMA fighter

=== June ===
- 8 June: Falcão, footballer

=== July ===
- 20 July: Susana Werner, model and actress
- 30 July: Fabrício Werdum, Jiu-Jitsu practitioner

=== August ===
- 24 August: Denílson, footballer

=== September ===
- 14 September: Alex, footballer

=== October ===
- 31 October: Larissa Maciel, actress

=== November ===
- 6 November: Demian Maia, mixed martial artist
- 8 November: João Rodrigo Silva Santos soccer player (d. 2013)

=== December ===
- December 12: Evangelista Santos, mixed martial arts fighter

== Deaths ==
=== January ===
- 22 January: Maysa Matarazzo, singer (b. 1936)

=== February ===
- 13 February: Carolina Maria de Jesus, memorialist (b. 1914)

=== March ===
- 18 March: Carlos Pace, racing driver (b. 1944)

=== July ===
- 21 July: Zózimo, World Cup-winning footballer (b. 1932)

=== December ===
- 9 December: Clarice Lispector, writer (b. 1920)

== See also ==
- 1977 in Brazilian football
- Brazilian military government

== See also ==
- 1977 in Brazilian football
- 1977 in Brazilian television
