= Estádio Barão da Serra Negra =

Soccer stadium in Piracicaba, Brazil

Coordinates: 22°43′47″S 47°38′13″W

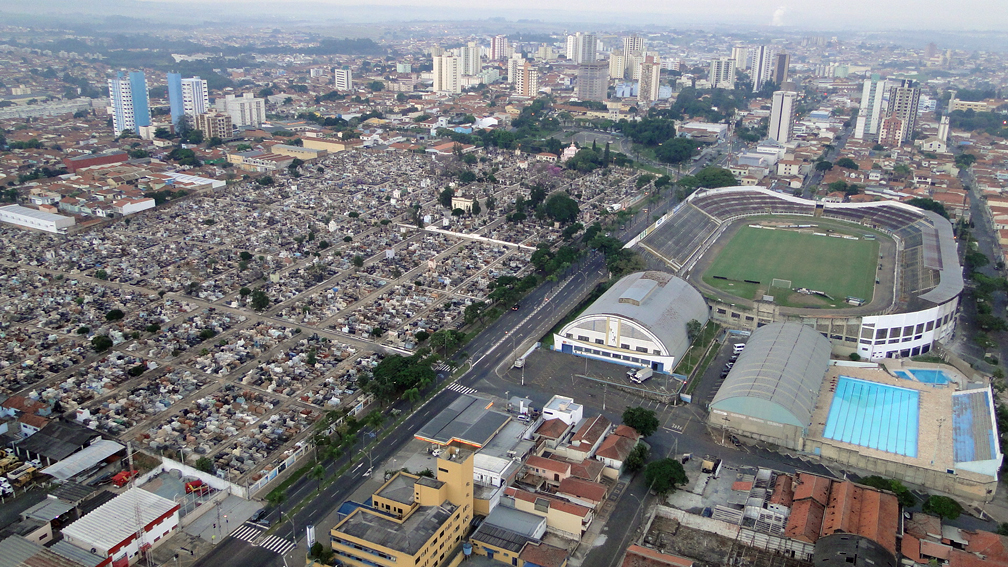
- Sisbrace
- Interactive map of Estádio Barão da Serra Negra
- Full name: Estádio Municipal Barão da Serra Negra
- Location: Piracicaba, São Paulo Brazil
- Owner: Municipality of Piracicaba
- Capacity: 18,000
- Surface: Grass
- Field size: 105 by 68 metres (114.8 yd × 74.4 yd)

Construction
- Opened: 4 September 1965

Tenant
- XV de Piracicaba (1965-present)

Estádio Barão da Serra Negra is a multi-use stadium located in Piracicaba, Brazil. It is used mostly for football matches and hosts the home matches of Esporte Clube XV de Novembro. The stadium has a maximum capacity of 18,799 people and was built in 1965. It is owned by the Prefecture of Piracicaba, and is named after Francisco José da Conceição, brazilian politician of 19th century.

== History ==
It was built in 1965, and inaugurated on September 4 of that year. The inaugural match was played on that day, when XV de Piracicaba and Palmeiras drew 0-0.

On September 19, 1965, the first goal of the stadium was scored by Corinthians' Flávio, when Corinthians beat XV de Piracicaba 3–1.

The largest audience ever recorded in the stadium was 27,100 people, on November 30, 1983, when XV de Piracicaba beat Bandeirante 3–2. On that occasion, the XV was proclaimed champion of the Paulista Championship of the Série A2. The incident occurred shortly after the death of legendary president Romeu Italo Ripoli, who dedicated much of his life to the Piracicaba club.
