= Dalton Paranaguá =

Brazilian doctor and politician

Mayor of Londrina
- In office 1 February 1969 – 31 January 1973
- Preceded by: José Hosken de Novaes
- Succeeded by: José Richa

Personal details
- Born: Dalton Fonseca Paranaguá; 12 July 1927 Jerumenha, Piauí, Brazil
- Died: 26 August 2014 (aged 87) Londrina, Paraná, Brazil
- Party: PMDB
- Education: Federal University of Rio de Janeiro
- Occupation: Doctor

Dalton Fonseca Paranaguá (12 July 1927 – 26 August 2014) was a Brazilian doctor and politician, affiliated with the Brazilian Democratic Movement (PMDB). He was the mayor of the city of Londrina, Paraná from 1969 to 1973.

== Biography ==
Dalton Paranaguá was born on 12 July 1927, the son of Augusto Nogueira Paranaguá and Izabel Fonseca Paranaguá. He was born in the town of Jerumenha, in the state of Piauí. He graduated with a degree in medicine from the Federal University of Rio de Janeiro in 1954, and for a time worked as a medic in the Brazilian Navy. In 1955, he moved to Paraná and by the 1960s, became a surgeon in Londrina.

In 1966, during the government of Paulo Cruz Pimentel, he became the state Secretary of Health. During his time in office, he implemented preventative medicines in public health, created the Hospital Foundation of Paraná, and was so rigorous that he sealed off the restaurant at the state governmental building, the Palácio Iguaçu, for a sanitary inspection.

A member of the PMDB, Paranaguá became a mayoral candidate in Londrina during the 1968 municipal elections and won. He assumed office in February 1969, succeeding José Hosken de Novaes.

=== Mayor of Londrina ===
Paranaguá was the mayor of Londrina from 1969 to 1972. During his administration, he completely tore down the favelas and replaced them with housing centers. His campaign slogan was "The health of the people is the supreme law", and summarily invested heavily in sanitation and brokered agreements with federal authorities to eradicate endemic diseases at the time, such as schistosomiasis and Chagas disease. His prior office as state Health secretary helped towards these efforts. He also invested in the spread of municipal telephone lines and modernized the fleet of public sanitation vehicles.

In 2008, the writer and journalist José Antonio Pedriali wrote a biography of Paranaguá, "Dalton Paranaguá e a construção do futuro". He was one of the main defenders of the creation of the State University of Londrina, for which he became a benefactor of the university in 2012.

=== Personal life ===
Paranaguá died in his home on 26 August 2014.
