= List of Brazilian films of 1980 =

A list of films produced in Brazil in 1980:

Title	Director	Cast	Genre	Notes
Os 7 Gatinhos	Neville d'Almeida	Cristina Aché, Antônio Fagundes, Lima Duarte, Ana Maria Magalhães	Comedy drama	Based on a play by Nelson Rodrigues
The Age of the Earth	Glauber Rocha	Maurício do Valle, Jece Valadão, Antonio Pitanga, Tarcísio Meira, Geraldo Del Rey	Drama	Based on a poem by Castro Alves
Amantes Violentos	Marcos Lyra	Marcos Lyra, Rosangela Faria, Fernando Reski	Erotic drama	
Os Anos JK - Uma Trajetória Política	Silvio Tendler	Othon Bastos	Documentary	As of 2007, the fourth most watched Brazilian documentary
Ariella	John Herbert	John Herbert, Nicole Puzzi, Christiane Torloni	Erotic drama	Based on a novel by Cassandra Rios
Ato de Violência	Eduardo Escorel	Nuno Leal Maia	Crime drama	Based on actual events about a serial killer known as Chico Picadinho
Até a Última Gota	Sérgio Rezende	José Dumont	Documentary	
Bacanal	Antonio Meliande	John Herbert, Aldine Müller, Patrícia Scalvi, José Carlos Sanches	Erotic drama	
O Beijo no Asfalto	Bruno Barreto	Tarcísio Meira, Ney Latorraca, Lídia Brondi, Christiane Torloni, Daniel Filho	Drama	Based on a play by Nelson Rodrigues
Boneca Cobiçada	Raffaele Rossi	Francisco di Franco, Aldine Müller	Erotic drama	
Bordel: Noites Proibidas	Osvaldo de Oliveira	Rossana Ghessa, Mário Benvenutti	Erotic drama	
Cabaret Mineiro	Carlos Alberto Prates Correia	Nelson Dantas, Tamara Taxman, Tânia Alves	Drama	Based on a novel by João Guimarães Rosa
Colegiais e Lições de Sexo	Juan Bajon	Aldine Müller, Fábio Vilalonga, José Lucas	Erotic drama	
O Convite ao Prazer	Walter Hugo Khouri	Roberto Maya, Serafim Gonzalez, Sandra Bréa, Helena Ramos, Kate Lyra, Aldine Müller	Erotic	
Corpo Devasso	Alfredo Sternheim	David Cardoso, Neide Ribeiro, Patrícia Scalvi, Meiry Vieira	Erotic	
Diário de uma Prostituta	Edward Freund	Helena Ramos, Alan Fontaine	Erotic drama	
Depravação	Elio Vieira de Araujo	Jair Delamare, Alice Dantas, Antonio Viana	Erotic	
A Fêmea do Mar	Ody Fraga	Neide Ribeiro, Jean Garrett, Aldine Müller	Erotic	
A Força dos Sentidos	Jean Garrett	Paulo Ramos, Aldine Müller	Erotic	
Gaijin: Roads to Freedom	Tizuka Yamasaki	Kyoko Tsukamoto, Antônio Fagundes, Jiro Kawarazaki, Gianfrancesco Guarnieri	Drama	
Giselle	Victor di Mello	Alba Valéria	Erotic	
O Gosto do Pecado	Cláudio Cunha	Simone Carvalho, Jardel Mello, John Herbert, Maria Lúcia Dahl	Erotic drama	
O Grande Palhaço	William Cobbett	Luiz Armando Queiroz, Angelina Muniz, Eduardo Tornaghi	Comedy drama	
O Inseto do Amor	Fauzi Mansur	Carlos Kurt	Sex comedy	
As Intimidades de Analu e Fernanda	José Miziara	Helena Ramos, Márcia Maria, Ênio Gonçalves	Erotic drama	
O Jeca e a Égua Milagrosa	Pio Zamuner	Amácio Mazzaropi	Comedy	
Joelma 23º Andar	Clery Cunha	Beth Goulart, Liana Duval	Drama	Depicts the Joelma fire
O Menino Arco-Íris	Ricardo Bandeira		Children's film	It depicts the childhood of Jesus Christ, who is played by children of six different races
Na Estrada da Vida	Nelson Pereira dos Santos	Milionário & José Rico, Nádia Lippi, Sílvia Leblon, Turíbio Ruiz	Musical	
A Noite das Taras	David Cardoso, John Doo, Ody Fraga	Patrícia Scalvi, Arlindo Barreto, Matilde Mastrangi	Erotic	
Pixote	Hector Babenco	Fernando Ramos da Silva, Jorge Julião, Gilberto Moura, Edilson Lino	Crime drama	Critically acclaimed at American festivals
O Rei e os Trapalhões	Adriano Stuart	Renato Aragão, Mussum, Dedé Santana, Zacarias, Mário Cardoso	Comedy	The most watched Brazilian film in 1980

== See also ==
- 1980 in Brazil
- 1980 in Brazilian television
