= José Richa Hydroelectric Plant =

Governor José Richa Dam
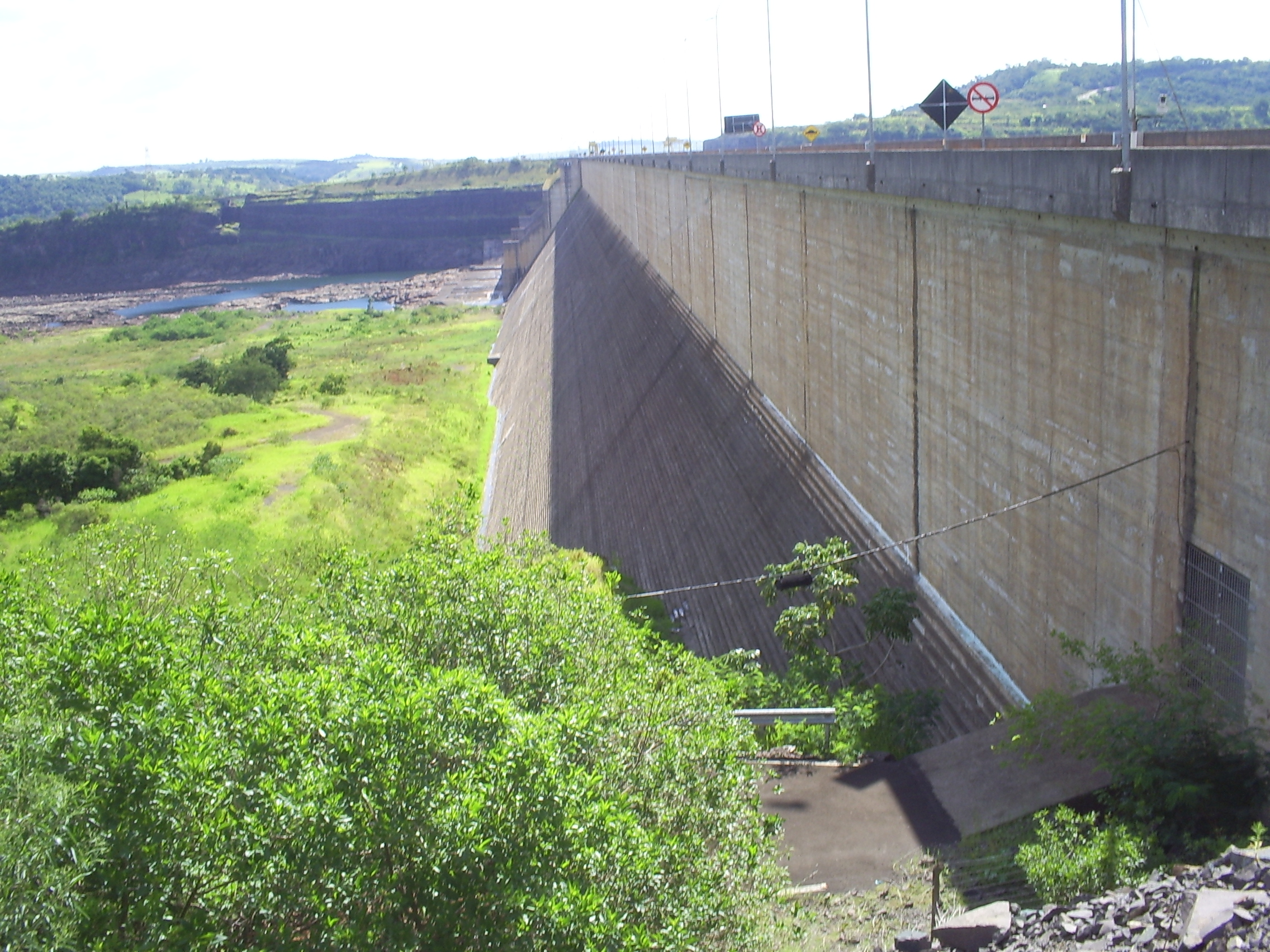
- The dam in 2008

- Location within Brazil
- Official name: Governador José Richa Hydroelectric Plant
- Location: Caxias, Paraná, Brazil
- Coordinates: 25°32′36″S 53°29′48″W
- Construction began: 1995
- Opening date: 1999
- Construction cost: $1 billion USD
- Owner: Copel

Dam and spillways
- Type of dam: Gravity, roller-compacted concrete
- Impounds: Iguazu River
- Height: 67 m (220 ft)
- Length: 1,100 m (3,600 ft)
- Spillway type: Service, controlled
- Spillway capacity: 50,000 m^{3}/s (1,800,000 cu ft/s)

Reservoir
- Creates: Governor José Richa Reservoir
- Surface area: 180 km^{2} (69 sq mi)

Power Station
- Commission date: 1999
- Type: Conventional
- Turbines: 4 x 310 MW (420,000 hp) Francis turbines
- Installed capacity: 1,240 MW (1,660,000 hp)
- Annual generation: 5,431 GWh (19,550 TJ)

The Governor José Richa Hydroelectric Plant, formerly known as Salto Caxias, is a dam and hydroelectric power plant on the Iguazu River near Caxias in Paraná, Brazil. It is the first dam upstream of the Iguazu Falls and was constructed between 1995 and 1999. The power station has a 1,240-megawatt (1,660,000 hp) capacity and is supplied with water by a roller-compacted concrete gravity dam.

It is owned and operated by Copel who renamed it after José Richa, governor of Paraná between 1983 and 1986.

== José Richa Dam ==
The José Richa Dam is 67 metres (220 ft) high, 1,100 metres (3,600 ft) long and was built with roller-compacted concrete. It is the eighth largest of its type in the world. The dam's designer, Intertechne Consultores Associados, along with Copel decided on an RCC design as it would be 25% cheaper than an embankment dam. Cracks were noticed in the dam during inundation in 1998 and Copel announced a plan to repair them in 2005. The dam's spillway contains 14 16.5-metre (54 ft) wide and 20 metres (66 ft) high radial gates, and has a maximum capacity of 50,000 cubic metres per second (1,800,000 cu ft/s). On the western portion of the dam, 15 sluice gates feed water from the reservoir into the power plant's intake channel.

== Power plant ==
Water from the dam's intake channel is fed into the power station by means of four 11-metre (36 ft) diameter and 107-metre (351 ft) long carbon steel penstocks. The power station is 180 metres (590 ft) long and contains four 310 megawatts (420,000 hp) generators manufactured by Ansaldo Coemsa. Each generator is power by a vertical-shaft Francis turbine manufactured by Kvaerner.

== Resettlement program ==
25% of the dam's $1 billion cost was involved in a resettlement program for the 1,000 families displace by the reservoir. The program included building community centers, roads, churches along with paying for healthcare, environmental protection and land provisions.

== See also ==
- List of power stations in Brazil
