= 1980 in Brazilian television =

This is a list of Brazilian television related events from 1980.

== Events ==
- July 18 - Rede Tupi, the first television station in Brazil, closes two months before turning 30.

== Television shows ==
=== 1970s ===
- Turma da Mônica (1976–present)
- Sítio do Picapau Amarelo (1977–1986)

== Networks and services ==
=== Launches ===
| Network | Type | Launch date | Notes | Source |
|---|---|---|---|---|
| InterTV Grandes Minas | Cable and satellite | 14 September | | |

=== Conversions and rebrandings ===
| Old network name | New network name | Type | Conversion Date | Notes | Source |
|---|---|---|---|---|---|
| Rede Tupi | Cable and satellite | 18 July | | | |

== Births ==
- 21 April - Sidney Sampaio, actor
- 22 April
  - Rodrigo Hilbert, actor & model
  - Elaine Mickely, actress & model
- 22 May - Tiago Leifert, journalist & TV host
- 13 June - Lígia Mendes, TV host & actress
- 20 July - Dado Dolabella, actor & singer
- 20 September - Guilherme Berenguer, actor

== See also ==
- 1980 in Brazil
- List of Brazilian films of 1980
