= João Mansur =

Brazilian politician (1923–2012)

Governor of Paraná
- In office July 4, 1973 – August 11, 1973
- Preceded by: Pedro Viriato Parigot
- Succeeded by: Emílio Hoffmann Gomes

Personal details
- Born: July 22, 1923 Irati, Paraná, Brazil
- Died: February 22, 2012 (aged 88) Curitiba, Paraná, Brazil

João Mansur (July 22, 1923 – February 22, 2012) was a Brazilian politician who served as the Governor of Paraná from July 4, 1973, until August 11, 1973. Mansur, who was the chairman of the Parana state legislature at the time, became governor when his predecessor, Governor Pedro Viriato Parigot, died in office. He served as governor for a little over one month until the appointment of his successor, Emílio Hoffmann Gomes.

Mansur was a merchant before entering politics. Mansur began his political career in 1951, when he was elected an alderman in Irati, Paraná. He also served as the city's mayor. In 1958, Mansur was elected to the state legislature, where he served for five terms.

Mansur died in Curitiba, Paraná, on February 22, 2012, at the age of 88. He was buried at the Cemitério Parque Iguaçu in Curitiba. Governor Beto Richa declared three days of official mourning.
