= Zenaide Maia =

Brazilian politician (born 1954)

- Official portrait

Senator for Rio Grande do Norte
- Incumbent
- Assumed office 1 February 2019
- Preceded by: José Agripino Maia

Federal Deputy for Rio Grande do Norte
- In office 1 February 2015 – 1 February 2019
- Constituency: Rio Grande do Norte

Personal details
- Born: 27 November 1954 (age 71) Brejo do Cruz, Paraíba, Brazil
- Party: PSD (2023–present)
- Other political affiliations: PR (2008–18); PHS (2018–19); PROS (2019–23)

Zenaide Maia Calado Pereira dos Santos (born 27 November 1954), better known as Zenaide Maia, is a Brazilian politician and doctor. Although born in Paraíba, she has spent her political career representing Rio Grande do Norte, currently serving as a Senator. She previously served in the Chamber of Deputies, from 2015 to 2019, and as secretary of health in São Gonçalo do Amarante from 1991 to 1992 and from 2009 to 2011.

== Personal life ==
Maia is the daughter of João Gonçalves Maia and Anunciada Cecilia da Silva. She is married to Jaime Calado, who from 2009 to 2016 was the mayor of São Gonçalo do Amarante.

== Political career ==
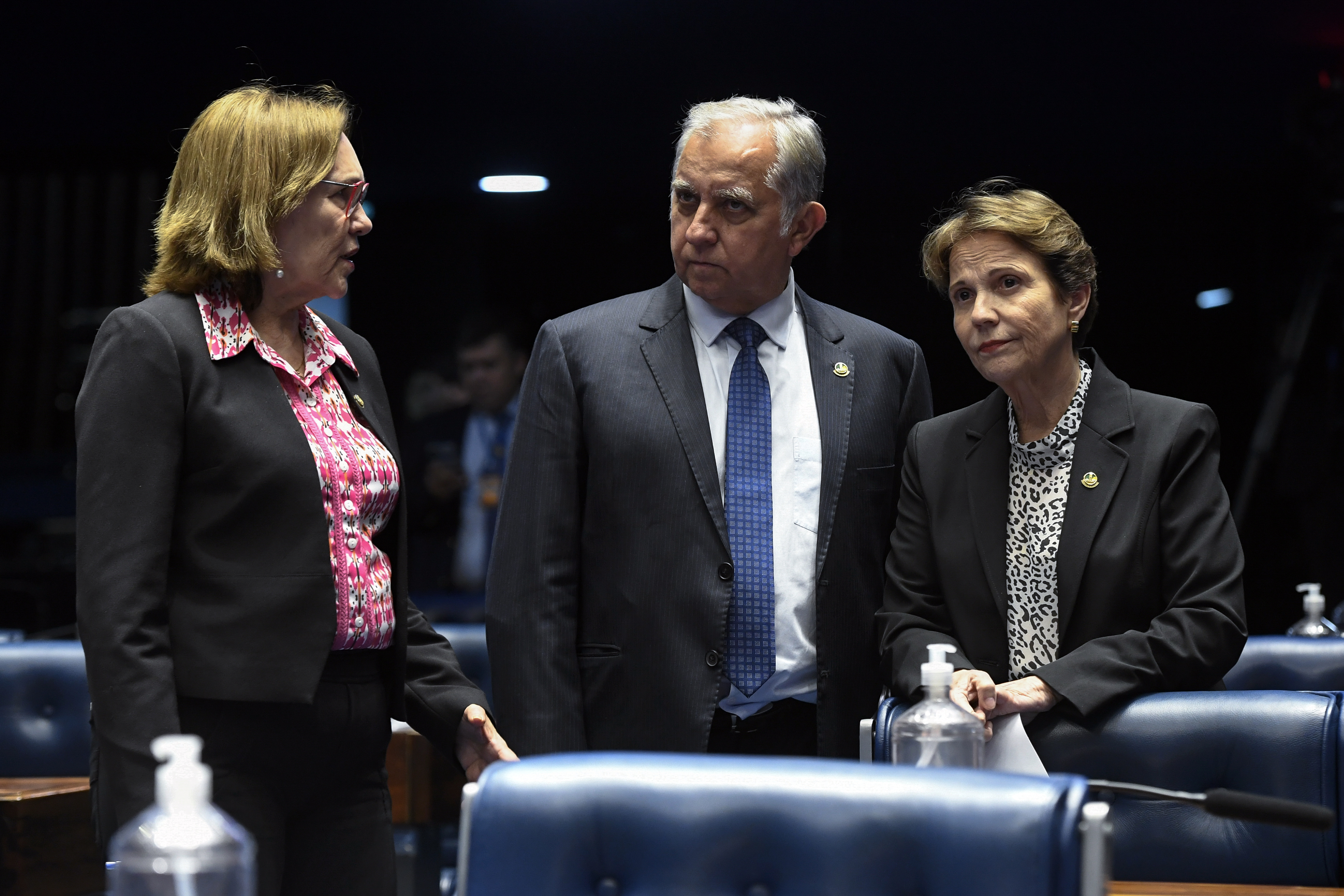
Zenaide Maia, Izalci Lucas and Tereza Cristina in 2023

Maia voted against the impeachment motion of then-president Dilma Rousseff. She opposed the 2017 Brazilian labor reforms, and voted in favor of opening a corruption investigation on Rousseff's successor, Michel Temer.

In the 2018 Brazilian general election, Maia was elected to the Federal Senate with 660,315 votes, along with Styvenson Valentim, to represent the state of Rio Grande do Norte.
