= 1986 in Brazilian television =

This is a list of Brazilian television related events from 1986.

== Events ==
- 30 June – The children's program Xou da Xuxa premieres on TV Globo.
- 28 December – Os Trapalhões celebrates 20 years of their career with a special program dedicated to the Campanha do Menor Carente. That is a part of the social mobilization campaign Criança Esperança, which airs at 11 a.m. and lasts for nine hours.

== Debuts ==
- June 30 - Xou da Xuxa (1986-1992)

== Television shows ==
=== 1970s ===
- Turma da Mônica (1976–present)

== Ending this year ==
- Sítio do Picapau Amarelo (1977–1986)
- Balão Mágico (1983-1986)

== Births ==
- 29 April - Monique Alfradique, actress
- 14 June - Klebber Toledo, actor & model
- 14 September - Giovanna Ewbank, actress & model
- 9 December - Bruno Gissoni, actor

== See also ==
- 1986 in Brazil
