= Death of Clara Nunes =

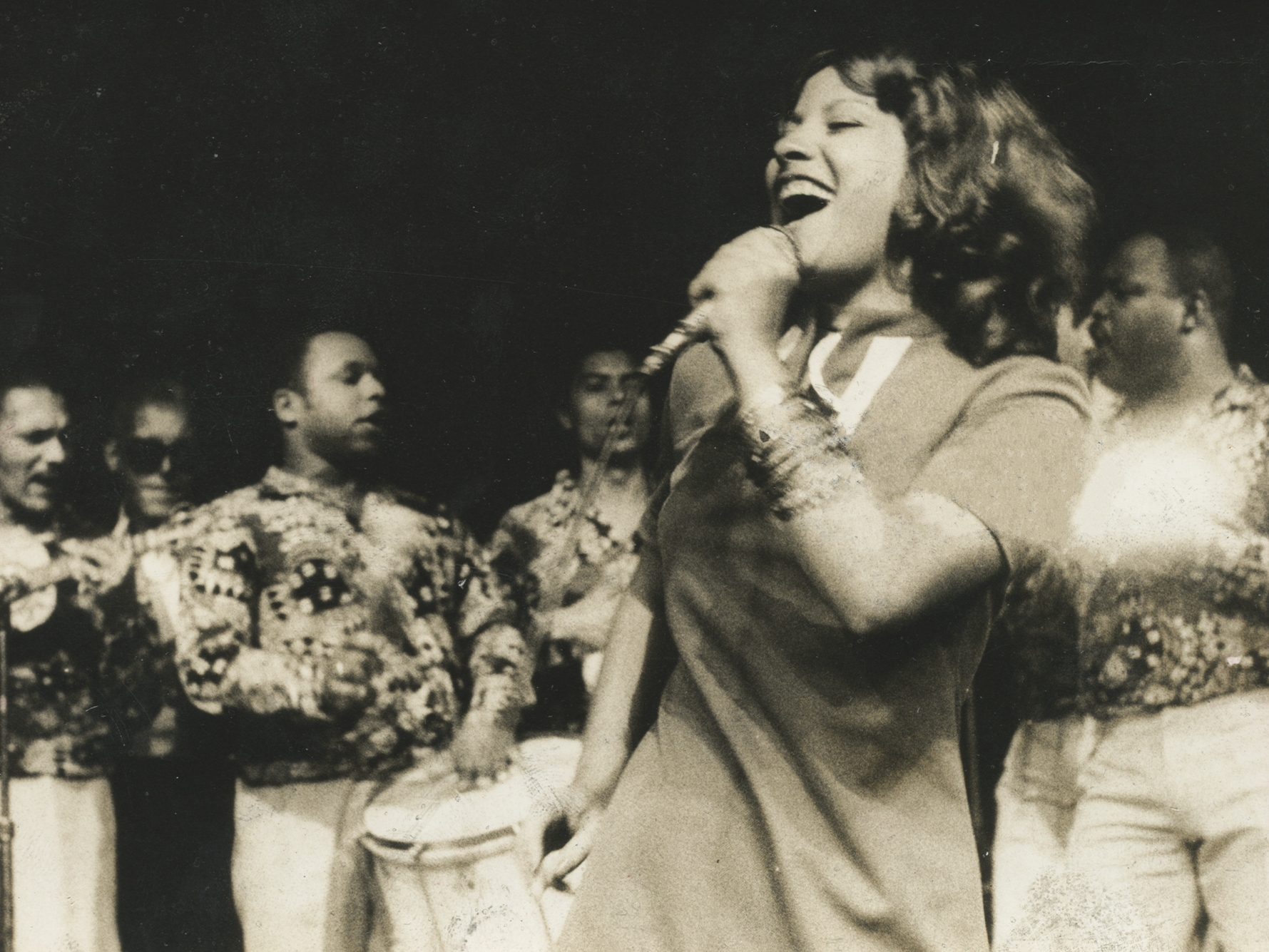
- Clara Nunes in the early 70s.
- Time: April 2, 1983; 43 years ago
- Venue: São Vicente Clinic
- Location: Rio de Janeiro, Rio de Janeiro Brazil
- Cause: Halothane anaphylaxis
- Outcome: An investigation by the Bahia Regional Medical Council (Cremeb) determined that there had been no medical error.
- Burial: São João Batista Cemetery

The death of Clara Nunes occurred on April 2, 1983, and was caused by anaphylactic shock triggered by halothane at the São Vicente Clinic in Rio de Janeiro. Before her death, she spent 28 days in a coma with immediate brain death after suffering anaphylaxis during surgery to remove varicose veins from her legs on March 5 of that year. There was considerable speculation regarding the cause of Clara's coma. The work of the doctors who attended her and her relationship with her husband, songwriter Paulo César Pinheiro, were thoroughly analyzed by the press and her fans. An investigation conducted by the Regional Council of Medicine of Bahia, commissioned by the Regional Council of Medicine of Rio de Janeiro (which was unable to investigate because the Federal Council of Medicine had intervened) concluded that Clara had not suffered a medical error. The cause of death presented on her death certificate was "hypersensitivity to halothane", a gas administered during surgery as an anesthetic.

== Surgery background ==
After undergoing a hysterectomy in 1979 due to a proliferating myoma in her uterus, Clara Nunes started receiving sclerotherapy treatment, which consists of injecting medication directly into the varicose veins. Over time, the caliber of the veins decreases and the vessels close up. Angiologist Antonio Vieira de Mello was chosen by Clara to conduct the treatment on the recommendation of Cézar Seminario, her gynecologist. She wished to treat some protruding varicose veins that bothered her aesthetically. She attributed the pain she felt in her legs to varicose veins, which was considered exaggerated by people close to her.

Improving the look of her legs became an obsession for Clara, who had always been very vain. Her concern became more relevant when thicker varicose veins appeared, which could only be treated by surgery. In June 1982, after performing at the Horizonte Latin American Art Festival in West Berlin, Clara phoned her friend Bibi Ferreira from the hotel room where she was staying to tell her that she was worried about her varicose veins. Clara reportedly told her friend that she was dancing at the front of the stage when she noticed that everyone was looking at her legs, at the level of her shins, and notified her friend of her decision to have surgery to remove her varicose veins after returning to Brazil. Bibi tried to convince her that the concern was silly, but said that she should have the surgery if she was really bothered.

== Surgery ==
Clara scheduled the surgery for March 5, 1983. Doctor Antonio Vieira de Mello headed the surgical team. She asked for complete secrecy to avoid any press reports. The date chosen for the surgery followed Carnival (celebrated on February 15 that year), when Clara had paraded for the last time in the Portela and the Clube do Samba carnival block, which she had helped to found in January 1979. About two weeks before the surgery, she submitted to another minor procedure at the ophthalmology clinic of Marcos Wajnberg to remove a chalazion. According to Wajnberg, "in this case, the surgery was not for aesthetic reasons, but out of necessity. The chalazion is harmful and has to be removed".

On the day scheduled for the surgery, Clara got up early and headed to the São Vicente Clinic in Gávea, accompanied by her friend Vilarinda Marçal de Faria, whom Clara had asked to come from Paraopeba to help her in the days following the operation. According to her husband Paulo César, who found out about the surgery in late February, Clara decided not to have epidural anesthesia because she was afraid of becoming paralyzed if there was a medical error.

Clara arrived at the clinic and went straight to her room. When the anesthesiologist Américo Salgueiro Autran Filho arrived, Clara informed him that she had opted for general anesthesia. The doctors tried to convince her to abandon the idea, explaining the advantages of the epidural, and that general anesthesia, in the case of small surgeries, could cause complications. In the end, they agreed to Clara's request.

After Américo applied the anesthesia to Clara, Antonio Vieira began to operate on her. She had been anesthetized with a mixture of halothane, nitrogen protoxide and oxygen. Her right leg had already been operated on and her left leg was being sutured when Antonio noticed that Clara's blood was very dark and gushing out in large quantities. He asked Américo to check her blood pressure, as she was suffering a cardiac arrest. Antonio ordered the anesthetic outlet to be closed and the oxygen supply to the tracheal tube to be increased to 100%. Manual resuscitation had already begun, but was interrupted due to heart fibrillation. Clara was revived with a defibrillator, but did not respond voluntarily to stimuli, indicating that she had fallen into a coma.

Clara had suffered a strong allergic reaction to one of the components used in the anesthetic, which caused a generalized dilation of all the blood capillaries in her body. Her brain failed to withstand the pressure and a huge edema formed, causing her immediate brain death. At 3:40 in the afternoon, Clara was taken to the clinic's Intensive Care Unit (ICU).

== Coma period and repercussions ==
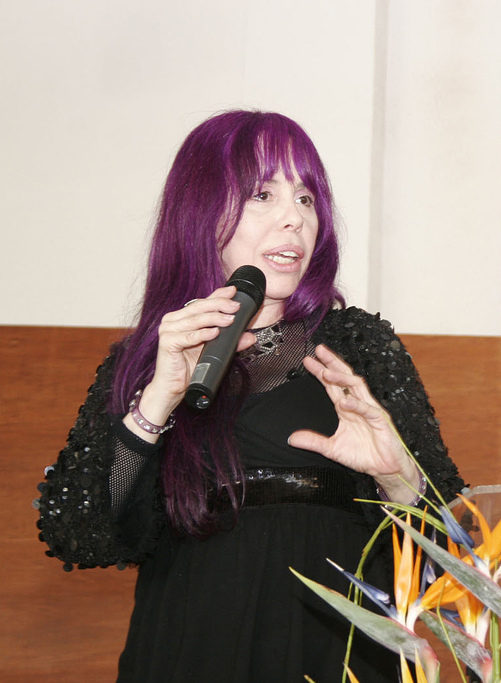
Baby Consuelo caused a stir when she tried to enter the ICU with medicine man Thomaz Green Morton.

According to the medical team, if Clara survived, she would have very serious sequelae due to the lack of oxygen in her brain. Her husband, Paulo César, began to closely monitor her medical condition, as did her family, who left Minas Gerais to take care of her. At his request, who hoped that the situation would be reversed, the case was kept under wraps, but ended up leaking to the press two days later.

As soon as the information about Clara's state of health was published, Engenheiro Alfredo Dutra Street, where she lived, and the São Vicente Clinic were crowded with reporters. At this point, it had already been reported that Clara had suffered anaphylactic shock as a result of surgery, but different versions of the motives behind her surgical procedure began to circulate, such as artificial insemination, abortion and a suicide attempt. It was also rumored that the anaphylactic shock was caused by the huge amount of whiskey she had drunk the night before the surgery and that she was a drug user.

Dozens of fans and artists arrived at the São Vicente Clinic, which became the place for hysterical crises and prayers. Rosemary, Elizeth Cardoso, Dori Caymmi, Grande Otelo, João Nogueira, Dona Zica, Mauro Duarte, Fafá de Belém, Paulinho da Viola, Luiz Ayrão, Roberto Ribeiro, Alcione, Elza Soares, Beth Carvalho, Chico Buarque, Marieta Severo and Baby Consuelo are among the artists who went to the clinic.

Baby Consuelo had one of the most tense moments when she tried to enter the ICU with Thomaz Green Morton, a medicine man who had convinced several artists that his "paranormal powers" cured serious illnesses. However, she was blocked by Maria Gonçalves Pereira and Branca, Clara's sisters. While Clara was in a coma, all kinds of healers appeared, but Paulo César Pinheiro prevented most of them from entering. One of the few medicine men he allowed into the ICU was the Chinese acupuncturist Mister Wu, who tried to revive Clara using an acupuncture technique called moxibustion.

None of the attempts were successful. Clara had no brain activity and the doctors were aware that her vital functions would cease at any moment. Ten days after the onset of the coma, the real extent of the edema was discovered when Clara was taken for a CT scan at Santa Casa. At the hospital, they concluded that nothing could be done to prevent her death due to the size of the edema. Faced with Paulo César's silence and the uninformative medical reports, the media demanded that the doctors hold a press conference and that the operating room be opened for an inspection of the equipment. In the third week of March, the head of anesthesia guided members of the press around the clinic. There were suspicions that the anesthesiologist Américo Salgueiro had been absent from the room during the surgery, that a medical error had occurred in her care and that there had been a failure in the equipment that released oxygen. Veja magazine interviewed an employee of the operating room who said that there was indeed a lack of oxygen during the operation.

== Death, wake and burial ==
In the early hours of April 2, 1983, Clara's vital functions began to disappear. At 4:30 in the morning, she died of heart failure after spending 28 days in a coma. Maria Gonçalves and Paulo César Pinheiro contacted Portela's president, Nezinho, to arrange for the funeral to take place at the school's headquarters in Madureira. Radio stations announced her death and fans flocked to the clinic door and the Portelão. As a safety measure, Clara's body was transported by ambulance from the São Vicente Clinic to Portela's headquarters. After the body was placed in the coffin, six soldiers from the Military Police led it to the center of the court to the applause of the more than 5,000 people who had gathered there. Meanwhile, programming on Brazil's main television networks was interrupted with live flashes from the clinic and the Portela's court; on the radio, the hits from Clara's latest album, Nação, played incessantly.

At the time, only 30 soldiers from the Military Police were securing the site, as well as some private security guards from Portela. Six security guards from TV Globo were also present and acted truculently, pushing the public and reporters away from the center of the court. Some of the people present fell from a stage about two meters high. There was a rush of pushing and falling and the coffin nearly fell to the ground. Shortly afterwards, there was a second riot, with people running into the street. Some felt ill and at least one person fainted from lack of air. The Portela management, unable to control the situation, took refuge in a room with Clara's family. The Military Police shock battalion was called in to contain the crowd. Overall, 50,000 people passed through the Portela's headquarters to say goodbye to Clara.

At 4pm, the coffin was closed and covered with the flags of Clube do Samba, Portela, Mangueira, Caprichosos de Pilares and Império Serrano. A fire department truck took the coffin to the São João Batista Cemetery, where Clara was buried at 6pm after a small uproar at the time of her arrival due to the large number of people who had gathered there.

== Religious interpretation ==
Clara Nunes was one of the main exponents of Afro-Brazilian religiosity through her music. As a result, her death was subject to religious interpretation. Some Umbanda practitioners said she had been reckless to operate during Lent. The pai-de-santo Edu, who was Clara's guide until he split up with Paulo César Pinheiro, had warned her not to have surgery during that period. Clara had opted for general anesthesia because of the advice he had given her. He later exonerated himself from any blame for Clara's death, claiming that she was following the guidance of the wrong orishas.

According to neo-Pentecostalism, Clara's death was caused by the intercession of a demonic spirit. According to Edir Macedo, founder of the Universal Church of the Kingdom of God and current owner of Record, the demonic possession was revealed during an unloading session held in one of his temples. According to him, "the spirit that was in her was manifested by a person present" at the time and this spirit said that it would "take her away".

The day after Clara Nunes' funeral, her grave became a place of pilgrimage for Candomblé and Umbanda worshippers. It remains a popular place to visit to this day, especially for followers of Afro-Brazilian cults, who perform rituals there and leave offerings to her, such as flowers and candles. According to the newspaper O Globo, Clara Nunes' tomb is currently the second most visited in the São João Batista Cemetery during the All Souls' holiday, behind Cazuza's tomb.

== Investigation ==
Paulo César Pinheiro decided not to file a lawsuit against the doctors who treated Clara for medical malpractice since he had to authorize the exhumation of her body, which she had expressed her disapproval of before she died. In addition, the Regional Council of Medicine of the State of Rio de Janeiro (Cremerj) was under intervention by the Federal Council of Medicine (CFM) since 1978.

The intervention in Cremerj began when two opposition parties disregarded a rule issued by Murilo Belchior, former president of the CFM, which banned the inclusion of candidates with less than five years of training on the ballot. Slate 2, which won the election, did not have the results ratified by the CFM. There are indications that the votes were rejected because the opposition slates were linked to trade unions, which displeased the CFM board, allegedly linked to the military dictatorship. Eventually, the CFM appointed a provisional board for Cremerj with limited functions and composed of members of Slate 1. In 1983, Cremerj decided to investigate the causes of Clara Nunes' death. However, the trial was held by the Regional Council of Medicine of Bahia (Cremeb), chaired at the time by Aristides Maltez Filho.

Journalist Vagner Fernandes, author of Guerreira da Utopia, Clara Nunes' biography released in 2007, had access to the documents about the investigation into Clara's death, which total five volumes and 815 pages. The documents include Américo Salgueiro's version of the anaphylactic shock, the testimonies of each of the team members who worked on the surgery and those of other witnesses mentioned in news reports, and the medical records detailing which drugs were given to Clara during the 28 days she was hospitalized at São Vicente Clinic. Cremerj's provisional board had decided to gather newspaper clippings and request reports on the case from doctors Antonio Vieira de Mello, Américo Salgueiro Filho and Jacob Cukier (then head of the clinic's ICU). On June 27 and 28, Paulo César Pinheiro, members of the surgical team and directors of the clinic testified to Fernando Marigliano and Artur Ventura, from Cremeb, at Cremerj's former headquarters in Rio de Janeiro.

As it had been reported that anesthesiologist Américo Salgueiro had left the operating room to take a phone call, Josélia Alves Pereira, the clinic's operator, was also invited to testify. When asked if any of the doctors from Antonio Vieira's team had been at the call center during her shift, she said no. When asked if any doctors were in the call center at the time of the operation, she said she didn't know, because her shift started at noon (one hour and fifteen minutes after the surgery began). All the team members confirmed that Américo had been in the room continuously. There was media coverage of the fact that the São Vicente Clinic had not asked Clara to undergo drug allergy tests before the surgery, but the clinic argued that this was not standard procedure.

The testimonies revealed that, from both a technical and human point of view, there were no flaws. Overall, thirteen people were heard. The councilors' report was based on the evidence presented by the doctors and the testimony of witnesses. It was unanimously approved at a plenary session held on July 28, 1983. Cremeb's decision could be appealed. However, Paulo César Pinheiro reportedly said that he would not appeal because he "didn't believe in this justice system".

== See also ==
- 1983 in Brazil

== Bibliography ==
- Fernandes, Vagner (2007). Clara Nunes: Guerreira da Utopia. Rio de Janeiro: Ediouro. ISBN 978-85-774-8031-9.
