= 1942 in Brazil =

Events in the year 1942 in Brazil.

== Establishments ==
- Construction of the Basilica Shrine of Our Lady Mediatrix of All Graces was completed.

== Incumbents ==
=== Federal government ===
- President: Getúlio Vargas

=== Governors ===
- Alagoas: Ismar de Góis Monteiro
- Amazonas: Álvaro Botelho Maia
- Bahia: Landulfo Alves (till 3 December); Renato Pinto Aleixo (from 3 December)
- Ceará: Francisco de Meneses Pimentel
- Espírito Santo: João Punaro Bley
- Goiás: Pedro Ludovico Teixeira
- Maranhão:
- Mato Grosso: Júlio Strübing Müller
- Minas Gerais: Benedito Valadares Ribeiro
- Pará: José Carneiro da Gama Malcher
- Paraíba: Rui Carneiro
- Paraná: Manuel Ribas
- Pernambuco: Agamenon Magalhães
- Piauí: Leônidas Melo
- Rio Grande do Norte: Rafael Fernandes Gurjão
- Rio Grande do Sul: Osvaldo Cordeiro de Farias
- Santa Catarina: Nereu Ramos
- São Paulo: Ademar de Barros (till 4 June); Fernando de Sousa Costa (from 4 June)
- Sergipe: Milton Pereira de Azevedo (till 27 March); Augusto Maynard Gomes (from 27 March)

=== Vice governors ===
- Rio Grande do Norte: no vice governor
- São Paulo: no vice governor

== Events ==
- date unknown - Aircraft manufacturer Companhia Aeronáutica Paulista is established in São Paulo.

=== January ===
- January 28 - Brazil breaks diplomatic relations with the Axis countries.

=== July ===
- July 26 - The Brazilian ship Tamandaré is sunk by the German submarine U-66 (1940) off the coast of Trinidad and Tobago.

=== August ===
- August 17 - The ships Itagiba and Arará are torpedoed by German submarine U-507.
- August 22 - President Getúlio Vargas signs the declaration of war against Germany and Italy.

=== October ===
- October 28 - The Brazilian freighter Rio Branco attacks a German submarine.

=== November ===
- November 1 - The Cruzeiro "antigo" is adopted as the official currency.

== Arts and culture ==
=== Books ===
- Jorge Amado - Gabriela
- Júlio Afrânio Peixoto - Pepitas

=== Films ===
- Saludos Amigos (first appearance of José Carioca, the cigar-smoking Brazilian parrot)

=== Music ===
- Heitor Villa-Lobos - Rudepoêma (orchestral version)

== Births ==
=== January ===
- 19 January - Nara Leão, singer and actress (died 1989)

=== March ===
- 6 March - Flora Purim, jazz singer
- 19 March - José Serra, politician

=== April ===
- 20 April - Roberto Freire, politician
- 23 April - Jorge Antunes, composer

=== June ===
- 3 June - Celso Amorim, diplomat and politician
- 26 June - Gilberto Gil, singer, guitarist, and songwriter

=== August ===
- 7 August - Caetano Veloso, musician and writer
- 23 August
  - Jarbas Vasconcelos, politician and lawyer
  - Susana Vieira, actress (as Sônia Maria Vieira Gonçalves)

=== October ===
- 26 October - Anecy Rocha, actress (died 1977)

== Deaths ==
- 13 February - Epitácio Pessoa, 11th President of Brazil (born (1865)
- 23 April - Olga Benário Prestes, political activist (born 1908 in Germany)
- 17 October - Sebastião da Silveira Cintra, Roman Catholic cardinal (born 1882)

== See also ==
- 1942 in Brazilian football
- List of Brazilian films of 1942
