= 1983 in Brazilian television =

This is a list of Brazilian television related events from 1983.

== Events ==
- 3 January - Reorganization of the local news bulletins on TV Globo, with Jornal das Sete being replaced by Praça TV.

== Debuts ==
- 7 March - Balão Mágico (1983-1986)
- 6 June - Guerra dos Sexos

== Television shows ==
=== 1970s ===
- Turma da Mônica (1976–present)
- Sítio do Picapau Amarelo (1977–1986)

== Networks and services ==
=== Launches ===
Network	Type	Launch date	Notes	Source
Rede Manchete	Cable and satellite	5 June		

== Births ==
- 4 June - Fernanda Paes Leme, actress, TV host & director
- 11 August - Tatá Werneck, Brazilian actress, television presenter and comedian
- 26 November - Sheron Menezzes, actress
- 14 December - Igor Rickli, actor
- 16 December - Raphael Viana, actor

== See also ==
- 1983 in Brazil
- List of Brazilian films of 1983
