= 1839 in Brazil =

Events in the year 1839 in Brazil.

== Incumbents ==
- Monarch: Pedro II

== Births ==
- 30 April: Floriano Peixoto, soldier and politician (d. 1895)
- 21 June: Machado de Assis, writer and first President of the Brazilian Academy of Letters (d. 1908)
