= List of Brazilian films of 1983 =

A list of films produced in Brazil in 1983:

Title	Director	Cast	Genre	Notes
Aluga-se Moças 2	Deni Cavalcanti	Deni Cavalcanti, Rita Cadillac, Tânia Gomide, Maristela Moreno, India Amazonense, Lia Hollywood	Drama	
Arapuca do Sexo	Alcides Caversan	Fernando Magalhães, Vilma Vitti, Rosana Freitas, Tatiana Dantas, Dinéia Ramos	Drama	
Atrapalhando a Suate	Victor Lustosa, Dedé Santana	Os Trapalhões	Comedy	
As Aventuras de Mário Fofoca	Adriano Stuart	Luis Gustavo	Comedy	
Bacanal de Colegiais	Juan Bajon	Rosa Maria Pestana, Taya Fatoom, Tony Cassab	Drama	
Bar Esperança	Hugo Carvana	Marília Pera, Hugo Carvana, Paulo César Pereio, Sílvia Bandeira, Thelma Reston	Comedy	
O Cangaceiro Trapalhão	Daniel Filho	Os Trapalhões, Nelson Xavier	Comedy	The most watched Brazilian film in 1983
Eva, o Princípio do Sexo	José Carlos Barbosa	Silvana Lopes, Rosangela Taddei, Irineu Pinheiro, Lia Furlim	Pornographic	
Flor do Desejo	Guilherme de Almeida Prado	Imara Reis, Caíque Ferreira, Tamara Taxman, Raymundo de Souza	Drama	
Fuscão Preto	Jeremias Moreira Filho	Almir Rogério, Xuxa Meneghel	Adventure, drama	
Gabriela, Cravo e Canela	Bruno Barreto	Sônia Braga, Marcello Mastroianni	Romance	
Inocência	Walter Lima, Jr.	Fernanda Torres, Edson Celulari, Fernando Torres, Sebastião Vasconcelos	Drama	
Parahyba Mulher Macho	Tizuka Yamazaki	Tânia Alves, Cláudio Marzo, Walmor Chagas	Drama	
A Princesa e o Robô	Maurício de Sousa	Marli Bortletto, Angélica Santos, Paulo Camargo, Elza Gonçalves	Animated	
Profissão: Mulher	Cláudio Cunha	Simone Carvalho, Cláudio Marzo, Lady Francisco, Wilma Dias	Drama	
A Próxima Vítima	João Batista de Andrade	Antônio Fagundes, Gianfrancesco Guarnieri, Mayara Magri	Crime	
Sergeant Getulio	Hermanno Penna	Lima Duarte	Drama	Entered into the 13th Moscow International Film Festival
O Trapalhão na Arca de Noé	Del Rangel	Renato Aragão, Sérgio Mallandro, Fábio Villa Verde, Manfredo Colassanti	Comedy	

== See also ==
- 1983 in Brazil
- 1983 in Brazilian television
