= List of Brazilian films of 1942 =

The following Brazilian films were released in 1942.

Title	Director	Cast	Genre	Notes
It's All True	Orson Welles; Norman Foster		Documentary	This is an unfinished film.
Saludos Amigos	Norman Ferguson; Wilfred Jackson; Jack Kinney; Hamilton Luske; William Roberts	Lee Blair; Mary Blair; Pinto Colvig; Walt Disney; Norman Ferguson; Frank Graham; Clarence Nash; José Oliveira; Frank Thomas	Aviation film	This film was first appearance of José Carioca

== See also ==
- 1942 in Brazil
