= 1977 in Brazilian television =

This is a list of Brazilian television related events from 1977.

== Debuts ==
=== 1970s ===
- 7 March - Sítio do Picapau Amarelo (1977–1986)

== Television shows ==
=== 1970s ===
- Turma da Mônica (1976–present)

== Ending this year ==
- Vila Sésamo (1972-1977, 2007–present)

== Births ==
- 21 September - Daniele Suzuki, actress & TV host
- 14 December - Ellen Jabour, model & TV host

== See also ==
- 1977 in Brazil
