= José Richa =

Brazilian politician (1934–2003)

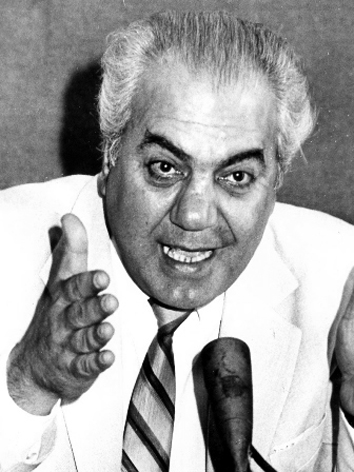

Senator of Paraná
- In office 1987–1995
- In office 1978–1982

Governor of Paraná
- In office 15 March 1983 – 9 May 1986
- Preceded by: José Hosken de Novaes
- Succeeded by: João Elísio Ferraz de Campos

Mayor of Londrina
- In office 1973–1977
- Preceded by: Dalton Paranaguá
- Succeeded by: Antonio Belinati

Federal deputy of Paraná
- In office 1962–1970

Personal details
- Born: 11 September 1934 São Fidélis, Rio de Janeiro, Brazil
- Died: 17 December 2003 (aged 69) Curitiba, Paraná, Brazil
- Political party: PDC (1952–1965); MDB (1966–1979); PMDB (1980–1988); PSDB (1988–2003)
- Children: 3 (including Beto)

José Richa (11 September 1934 – 17 December 2003) was a Brazilian politician who served as a senator of the state of Paraná from 1987 to 1995, earlier having served as governor from 1983 to 1986. Prior to serving these positions, he was the mayor of Londrina from 1973 to 1977, and a federal deputy from the state from 1962 to 1970. After being one of the founding members of the Brazilian Democratic Movement (MDB), he later became one of the founding members of the Brazilian Social Democracy Party (PSDB) and was a member of the party until his death in 2003. His son, Beto Richa, later became the governor of Paraná after having been mayor of the capital Curitiba.

== Biography ==
Richa was born in São Fidélis, Rio de Janeiro to Assad Richa and Ana Miguel Richa, both immigrants from Lebanon. He moved to Paraná in his youth, where he graduated with a degree in odontology from the Federal University of Paraná in 1959. He was married to Arlete Vilela, with whom he had three children, including Beto Richa.

Richa was a president of the Students' Union of Paraná from 1957 to 1958, and served as an official of the cabinet of governor Moisés Lupion from 1961 to 1962. In 1962, he was elected a federal deputy from Paraná from the Christian Democratic Party (PDC). After the 1964 coup d'état, he became one of the founding members of the MDB. He was reelected in 1966. In 1970 he was a candidate for senator, later becoming the mayor of the city of Londrina from 1973 to 1977. In 1982, he was elected governor, during which time he built various social projects and became engaged in the Diretas Já movement. In early May 1986, he resigned as governor in order to run again for a vacant seat for senator. He left the now PMDB in 1988 to co-create the PSDB. He again ran for governor of Paraná but came in third place. He remained in his seat as senator until 1995, when he restarted his business activities.

Richa died in 2003. The local airport in Londrina, as well as a hydroelectric plant in rural Paraná, bear his name.

Political offices
Preceded by José Hosken de Novaes	47th Governor of Paraná; 1983–1986	Succeeded by João Elísio Ferraz de Campos
