= 1908 in Brazilian football =

Football in Brazil
- Season: 1908

The following article presents a summary of the 1908 football (soccer) season in Brazil, which was the 7th season of competitive football in the country.

== Campeonato Paulista ==
Final Standings

Position	Team	Points	Played	Won	Drawn	Lost	For	Against	Difference
1	Paulistano	15	10	6	3	1	24	17	7
2	Germânia	14	10	6	2	2	22	8	14
3	Americano-SP	14	10	6	2	2	15	10	5
4	SC Internacional de São Paulo	13	10	5	3	2	20	12	8
5	São Paulo Athletic	4	10	2	0	8	7	27	−20
6	Internacional de Santos	0	10	0	0	10	0	14	−14

Paulistano declared as the Campeonato Paulista champions.

== State championship champions ==
State	Champion
Bahia	Vitória
Rio de Janeiro (DF)	Fluminense
São Paulo	Paulistano
