= Alvaro Dias =

Brazilian politician (born 1944)

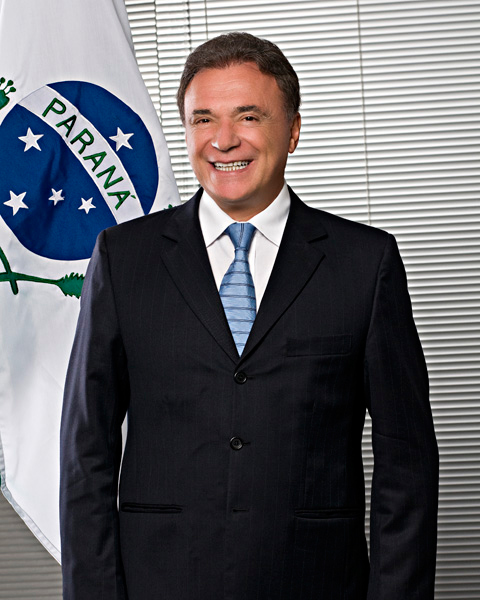

Senator for Paraná
- In office February 1, 1999 – February 1, 2023
- Preceded by: José Eduardo de Andrade Vieira
- Succeeded by: Sergio Moro
- In office February 1, 1983 – March 14, 1987
- Preceded by: Leite Chaves
- Succeeded by: Leite Chaves

Governor of Paraná
- In office March 15, 1987 – March 15, 1991
- Vice Governor: Ary Queiroz
- Preceded by: João Elísio Ferraz de Campos
- Succeeded by: Roberto Requião

Member of the Chamber of Deputies
- In office February 1, 1975 – February 1, 1983
- Constituency: Paraná

Member of the Legislative Assembly of Paraná
- In office February 1, 1971 – February 1, 1975
- Constituency: At-large

Member of the Municipal Chamber of Londrina
- In office February 1, 1969 – February 1, 1971
- Constituency: At-large

Personal details
- Born: December 7, 1944 (age 81) Quatá, São Paulo, Brazil
- Party: PODE (2017–present)
- Other political affiliations: MDB (1968–1979); PMDB (1979–1989); PST (1989–1993); PP (1993–1994); PDT (2001–2003); PSDB (1994-2001; 2003–2016); PV (2016–2017)
- Spouse: Débora Amaral de Almeida
- Education: State University of Londrina

Alvaro Fernandes Dias (born December 7, 1944) is a Brazilian politician. He had represented Paraná in the Federal Senate from 1999 to 2023. Previously, he was the governor of Paraná. He is a member of Podemos.

== Early life and career ==
Alvaro Dias was born in Quatá, in the countryside of São Paulo state, to farmer Silvino Fernandes Dias and housewife Helena Fregadolli. He was raised in the city of Maringá, Paraná, and attended the State University of Londrina, where he graduated with a degree in history in 1967.

Dias began his political career as an alderman for Londrina in 1968, being elected as a member of the Brazilian Democratic Movement (MDB). In the 1970 elections, he was elected to serve as state deputy of Paraná. In 1974, Dias was elected to the Chamber of Deputies, representing Paraná, and was re-elected in 1978.

In 1982 Dias was elected to the Federal Senate. In 1986, he defeated former federal deputy Alencar Furtado to serve as Governor of Paraná. In his second year as governor, Dias attained a 90% approval rate. In 1989 he ran for the PMDB presidential primary but lost to São Paulo congressman Ulysses Guimarães. Dias subsequently left PMDB and joined the Social Labour Party (PST).

In 1994 Dias joined the Progressive Party (PP) and ran for Paraná governor for a second time, losing to Jaime Lerner. That same year, he left PP and joined the Brazilian Social Democracy Party (PSDB).

== 2018 presidential campaign ==
On 4 August 2018, Alvaro Dias officially launched his candidacy for President of Brazil in the 2018 elections as a member of Podemos. His campaign received the support of the Social Christian Party (PSC) and the Progressive Republican Party (PRP). Economist Paulo Rabello de Castro (PSC) joined Dias's ticket as his running mate. Later on, the Christian Labour Party (PTC), the party of former president Fernando Collor, gave its support to Dias's candidacy.

== Teacher's Massacre ==
On August 30, 1988, the Military Police of the State of Paraná held a confrontation with teachers who were demonstrating for their rights in an act carried out in the state capital. The teachers' strike, which motivated the act, at that time, had already lasted fifteen days. It is not known for sure what sparked the confrontation, but the date was marked in the history of Paraná due to the brutal action of the police, who used stun bombs, horses and dogs against the demonstrators. As reported by Gazeta do Povo reporter Jônatas Dias Lima, "The repression left ten people injured and resulted in the arrest of five protesters." The reporter also tells us that the Paraná Teachers Association devoted the following years to recording the event, making a large part of it available on YouTube, as is the case of the video "30 Anos do 30 de Agosto de 1988" which features footage of the police repression.

The former governor, however, denies that there was any truculence and insists that the action was used for political ends. Jônatas recalls that back in 1988 the state government published a full-page advertisement highlighting that there were several points that could be distorted by personal or partisan interests. In 2018, during an interview with Jovem Pan, when asked about the matter by Marco Antonio Villa, who recalled that the date is remembered annually by the Teachers’ Association, the former governor called the episode “fake news”, “lie” and “factoid”. He also argued that the date is only historical for the APP-Sindicado, which, according to him, would be a Worker's Party device.

Political offices
Preceded by João Elísio Ferraz de Campos	49th Governor of Paraná; 1987–1991	Succeeded by Roberto Requião
Party political offices
Preceded by Thereza Ruiz	PODE nominee for President of Brazil; 2018	Most recent
