= Samanda de Lula =

Brazilian politician (born 1980)

- Samanda de Lula in 2024

Member of the Senate
- Incumbent
- Assumed office 1 February 2027
- Constituency: Rio Grande do Norte

Personal details
- Born: 20 September 1980 (age 46)
- Party: Workers' Party

Samanda Alves de Freitas (born 20 September 1980), better known as Samanda de Lula, is a Brazilian politician who was elected member of the Senate in 2026. She has been a member of the Municipal Chamber of Natal since 2025.
