= Caio Narcio =

Brazilian politician (1986–2020)

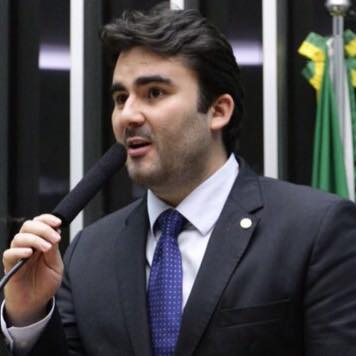
- Narcio in February 2015

Federal Deputy for Rio de Janeiro
- In office 1 February 2015 – 31 January 2019

Personal details
- Born: Caio Narcio Rodrigues da Silveira; 21 August 1986; Uberlândia, Brazil
- Died: 16 August 2020 (aged 33); São Paulo, Brazil
- Political party: PSDB (2006–2020)
- Profession: Social scientist, politician

Caio Narcio Rodrigues da Silveira (21 August 1986 – 16 August 2020), often simply known as Caio Narcio, was a Brazilian politician and a social scientist. Born in Minas Gerais, he served as a state representative from 2015 to 2019.

== Personal life ==
The son of politicians Narcio Rodrigues and Ana Cássia, Narcio graduated from the Pontifical Catholic University of Minas Gerais.

== Political career ==
Narcio voted in favor of the impeachment motion of then-president Dilma Rousseff. Narcio would vote in favor of a similar corruption investigation into Rousseff's successor Michel Temer, and he voted in favor of the 2017 Brazilian labor reforms.

== Health and death ==
In 2018, Narcio developed meningoencephalitis. On 2 July 2020, Narcio was taken to a hospital in São Paulo with a high fever, and subsequently tested positive for COVID-19 during the COVID-19 pandemic in Brazil. He died from complications of the virus exacerbated by meningoencephalitis on 16 August 2020, at age 33.
