= Esporte Clube XV de Novembro (Piracicaba) =

XV de Piracicaba
- Full name: Esporte Clube XV de Novembro
- Nicknames: XV; Nhô Quim
- Founded: 15 November 1913; 112 years ago
- Ground: Barão da Serra Negra
- Capacity: 18,000
- President: Matheus Bonassi Semmler
- Head coach: Fernando Marchiori
- League: Campeonato Brasileiro Série D Campeonato Paulista Série A2
- 2025: Paulista Série A2, 6th of 16
Home colours	Away colours

Esporte Clube XV de Novembro, commonly referred to as XV de Piracicaba, is a professional association football club based in Piracicaba, São Paulo, Brazil. The club competes in the Série D, the fourth tier of the Brazilian football league system, as well as in the Campeonato Paulista Série A2, the second tier of the São Paulo state football league.

A traditional São Paulo club, founded in 1913, XV de Piracicaba was runner-up in the 1976 São Paulo State Football Championship. Furthermore, it has five titles in the Campeonato Paulista Série A2 (1947, 1948, 1967, 1983 and 2011), one title in the Copa Brasil Central (1969), one title in the Campeonato Brasileiro Série C (1995) and three titles in the Copa Paulista (2016, 2022 and 2025).

The club was founded in 1913, and its most famous president was Romeu Italo Ripoli. His affectionate nickname is "Nhô Quim".

== History ==
During the 1910s, there were two important amateur football clubs in Piracicaba, Vergueirense, owned by Pousa family, and 12 de Outubro, owned by Guerrini family. In October 1913, the clubs' owners decided to merge both clubs. Captain Carlos Wingeter, of the Brazilian National Guard and who was also a dental surgeon, was appointed as the new club's first president. He accepted the task only if the club was named XV de Novembro (November 15), after the Brazilian Proclamation of Republic day.

On November 15, 1913, the club was founded as Esporte Clube XV de Novembro.

In 1943, XV de Piracicaba won its first title, which was the Campeonato Paulista Second Level, finishing one point ahead of Taubaté.

In 1964, Romeu Italo Ripoli took the XV on a tour through Europe and Asia. At that time, Brazil was already two-time world champion and only Santos and Botafogo made this type of trip. The team played in Sweden, Poland, Germany (Western and Eastern division of the season), Denmark and, at the height of Cold War, in the then Soviet Republics of Russia, Moldova, Ukraine, Kazakhstan and Uzbekistan.

In 1976, at the second term of Ripoli's presidency, the club finished second in the Campeonato Paulista Série A1, second only to Palmeiras.

In 1977, the club disputed the Campeonato Brasileiro First Division for the first time, finishing in the 22nd position, ahead of clubs like Internacional, Fluminense and Atlético Paranaense.

In 1979, XV de Piracicaba disputed the Campeonato Brasileiro First Division for the second time, finishing in the 13th position, ahead of clubs such as Fluminense and Botafogo.

In 1995, the club won its first national title, which was the Campeonato Brasileiro Série C, beating Volta Redonda of Rio de Janeiro state in the final.

In 2011, XV de Piracicaba was Série A2 champion after beating Guarani on penalty shoot outs after a draw score of 2–2 on the regular and extra time and gained again access to the São Paulo State First Division (Série A1) after 16 years.

In 2016, XV de Piracicaba was relegated from the São Paulo State First Division (Série A1) after 4 seasons in the top flight of the state competition. In the second semester of 2016, XV de Piracicaba won the Copa Paulista (one of top divisions of teams in who don't play in the top 4 leagues of the Brazilian Championship) for the first time in the club's history being awarded a spot in the Série D of the Brazilian Championship in 2017.

In 2022, Nhô Quim played again in the Copa Paulista de Futebol. In the first phase, they finished second in their group, with 4 wins, 5 draws and 1 loss, scoring 17 goals and conceding 11. In the quarterfinals, they faced Água Santa, drawing the first game 1-1 and winning the second 2-1. In the semifinals, against São Caetano, they lost the first game and won the second, both 1-0, advancing based on the best campaign. In the final, they beat Marília twice (3-1 and 3-2), becoming two-time champions of the Copa Paulista. With this, they earned the right to play in the Campeonato Brasileiro Série D the following year.

In 2025, XV again competed in the Copa Paulista. In the first phase, finished first overall, with 7 wins and 3 draws. Scored 13 goals and conceded 4. In the round of 16, they eliminated Araçatuba, losing 1-0 away and winning 2-0 in Piracicaba. In the quarterfinals, they won twice against Oeste, 1-0 away and 2-0 at home. In the semifinals, XV faced Comercial, drawing 1-1 in Ribeirão Preto and winning 1-0 in Piracicaba. In the finals, they lost to Primavera 1-0 away from home and won 2-0 at Barão da Serra Negra Stadium, becoming three-time champions of the competition.

== Honours ==
=== Official tournaments ===
National
Competitions	Titles	Seasons
Campeonato Brasileiro Série C	1	1995
State
Competitions	Titles	Seasons
Copa Paulista	3^{s}	2016, 2022, 2025
Campeonato Paulista Série A2	6^{s}	1931, 1947, 1948, 1967, 1983, 2011

- record
- ^{s} shared record

=== Others tournaments ===
==== Regional ====
- Copa Brasil Central (1): 1969

==== State ====
- Copa Ray-o-Vac (1): 1984
- Torneio José Ermirio de Moraes Filho (1): 1975
- Torneio Início (1): 1949

=== Runners-up ===
- Campeonato Paulista (1): 1976
- Copa Paulista (2): 2008, 2019
- Campeonato Paulista Série A2 (3): 1919, 1966, 1981

== Stadium ==
XV de Piracicaba's home stadium is Estádio Barão da Serra Negra, inaugurated in 1965, with a maximum capacity of 26,528 people. In the 2nd Semester of 2007, the stadium has undergone a structural renovation in order to allow its safe use.

== Mascot ==
XV de Piracicaba's mascot is Nhô Quim, created by Edson Rontani, and portraits the typical Piracicaban supporter.

== See also ==
- Campeonato Paulista
