= João Rodrigo =

Brazilian footballer (1977–2013)

Personal information
- Full name: João Rodrigo Silva Santos
- Date of birth: 8 November 1977
- Date of death: c. 29 October 2013 (aged 35)
- Place of death: Rio de Janeiro, Brazil
- Height: 1.81 m (5 ft 11 in)
- Position: Forward

Senior career*
Years	Team	Apps	(Gls)
1996–2005	Bangu	101	(30)
1998–1999	→ Olimpia (loan)		
1999	→ Nacional-SP (loan)		
2000	→ Atlético Sorocaba (loan)		
2003	→ Öster (loan)	6	(1)
2004–2005	Madureira		
2005	Remo		
2005	Volta Redonda		
2006–2007	Boavista		
2008	Tigres do Brasil		
2008–2009	Duque de Caxias		
2009	Olaria		
2009	Botafogo-DF		
2010	Bonsucesso		
2013	Sampaio Corrêa-RJ		
- * Club domestic league appearances and goals

João Rodrigo Silva Santos (8 November 1977 – c. 29 October 2013), known as just João Rodrigo, was a Brazilian professional footballer who played as a forward.

== Career ==
João Rodrigo played for Brazilian clubs Bangu, Madureira, Duque de Caxias, Remo, Volta Redonda, Tigres, Duque de Caxias, Olaria, Botafogo (DF) and Bonsucesso. He also spent a short time in Honduras with Olimpia. In 2003, he played briefly for Swedish club Öster, where he played six matches and scored one goal in Allsvenskan.

== Death ==
João Rodrigo was murdered by suspected drug traffickers on 29 October 2013, aged 35, in Rio de Janeiro. He did not return home that night. When his wife opened the door on her way to work the next morning, she found his severed head on the step of their front and, according to the police, inside a backpack. His eyes and tongue had been gouged out, according to Brazilian media reports.

== See also ==
- Death of Otávio Jordão da Silva
- List of solved missing person cases (post-2000)
- List of unsolved murders (2000–present)
