= Maria Luisa Monteiro da Cunha =

Brazilian librarian

- Born: September 14, 1908; São Paulo, Brazil
- Died: July 28, 1980 (aged 71); São Paulo, Brazil
- Education: University of São Paulo, Columbia University
- Occupations: librarian, cataloger

Maria Luisa Monteiro da Cunha (1908-1980) was a Brazilian librarian who developed many of the cataloging principles used in Brazil. Her extensive contributions to library science extend not only to national librarianship in Brazil but also to a variety of international library activities.

== Education ==
Originally trained as a dentist, she began studying library science in 1940. After receiving a scholarship from the American Library Association, she studied at the Columbia University School of Library Service. During her studies, she developed a set of principles that eventually became the framework for Brazilian cataloging. She also represented Columbia University at the First Conference of Librarians of the Americas in 1947.

== Work ==
After seven years at the São Paulo Municipal Library, she became the Director of the University of São Paulo Central Library, a position she held for twenty-nine years. In 1965, she joined a committee which would create the School for Communications and Arts at the university. During this time, she also became an active member of the Brazilian Committee of Library Technical Services, where she worked with the International Federation of Library Associations and Institutions on international cataloging principles and the revision of International Standard Bibliographic Description.

== Selected publications ==
- 1961 Treatment of Brazilian and Portuguese Names Paris: IFLA.
- 1965 Formación Profesional (Professional Training) Paris: IFLA
- 1975 Controle bibliográfico universal (Universal Bibliographical Control): Brasília.
- 1977 Bibliotecas universitárias em sistemas nacionais de informação(University Libraries in National Information Systems) Porto Alegre.
