= Moisés Lupion =

Brazilian politician (1908–1991)

Moisés Wille Lupion de Troia
- Moisés Lupion in 1949.

33rd Governor of Paraná
- In office March 12, 1947 – January 31, 1951
- Preceded by: Antônio Augusto de Carvalho Chaves
- Succeeded by: Bento Munhoz da Rocha Neto

Senator for Paraná
- In office February 1955 – February 1956

36th Governor of Paraná
- In office January 31, 1956 – January 31, 1961
- Preceded by: Adolfo Franco
- Succeeded by: Nei Braga

Federal Deputy for Paraná
- In office June 14, 1963 – April 1964

Personal details
- Born: March 25, 1908 Jaguariaíva, Paraná
- Died: August 29, 1991 (aged 83) Rio de Janeiro
- Spouse(s): Hermínia Lupion; Vilma Lupion
- Occupation: accountant, businessman, and politician

Moisés Wille Lupion de Troia (March 25, 1908 — August 29, 1991) was a Brazilian accountant, businessman, and politician who twice served as governor of the state of Paraná.
