= José Hosken de Novaes =

Brazilian politician (1917–2006)

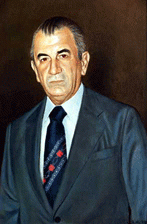

Governor of Paraná
- In office 14 May 1982 – 15 March 1983
- Preceded by: Ney Braga
- Succeeded by: José Richa

Vice-governor of Paraná
- In office 15 March 1979 – 14 May 1982
- Governor: Ney Braga
- Preceded by: Octávio Cesário Pereira Júnior
- Succeeded by: João Elísio Ferraz de Campos

Mayor of Londrina
- In office 12 December 1963 – 31 January 1969
- Preceded by: Milton Ribeiro de Menezes
- Succeeded by: Dalton Paranaguá

Personal details
- Born: 7 February 1917 Carangola, Minas Gerais, Brazil
- Died: 31 January 2006 (aged 88) Londrina, Paraná, Brazil
- Party: UDN; ARENA; PDS
- Education: Federal University of Rio de Janeiro
- Occupation: Lawyer

José Hosken de Novaes (7 February 1917 – 31 January 2006) was a Brazilian politician who briefly served as the governor of the state of Paraná from 1982 to 1983. He had previously served as the vice-governor of the state under governor Ney Braga. Prior to entering state politics, he was the mayor of the city of Londrina from 1963 to 1969.

== Biography ==
Hosken de Novaes was born on 7 February 1917 in Carangola, Minas Gerais, the son of Américo Moreira Novaes and Maria Hosken de Novaes. He was of Cornish descent. José moved to Rio de Janeiro in order to study law, and graduated with a degree in juridical sciences from the Federal University of Rio de Janeiro Faculty of Law. He moved to Londrina in 1941 to become the chief head of the juridical department. The rest of his family moved there in 1942, with him dedicating himself to advocacy.

He became involved in politics after the end of the Estado Novo regime in 1945, affiliating himself with the National Democratic Union (UDN). His reputation as a lawyer and as a leader went beyond the city, also becoming, at various points, the state prosecutor general, state Agriculture secretary, and a member of the State Commission of Land Revision and Queries.

In 1963, he was elected mayor of Londrina. During his administration, he created several public agencies, including the city telecommunications company and housing authority, the latter of which built the first public housing in Londrina. He also allocated resources towards education and water treatment.

Hosken de Novaes was later elected vice-governor of Paraná in 1979, later assuming the role of governor as then governor Braga ran for the federal senate. During his speech while taking office, he declared: "I intend to end this term without mischaracterizing it or reneging on its political promises." His brief administration was marked by limited spending, support for cultural activities, transparency, and social protections. He would later return to his law practice and teaching classes on civil rights.

Hosken de Novaes died on 31 January 2006.

Political offices
Preceded by Ney Braga	46th Governor of Paraná; 1982–1983	Succeeded by José Richa
