= José Agripino Maia =

Brazilian politician

José Agripino
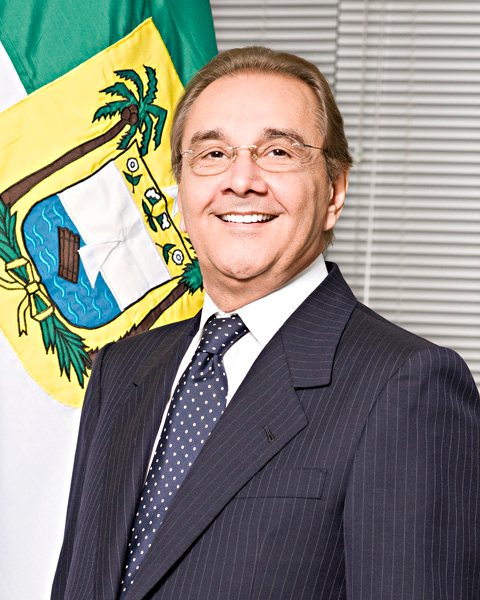

Senator for Rio Grande do Norte
- In office November 13, 2010 – February 1, 2019
- Preceded by: José Bezerra
- Succeeded by: Zenaide Maia
- In office February 1, 1995 – July 14, 2010
- Preceded by: Lavoisier Maia
- Succeeded by: José Bezerra
- In office February 1, 1987 – November 11, 1990
- Preceded by: Martins Filho
- Succeeded by: Dario Pereira

Governor of Rio Grande do Norte
- In office March 15, 1991 – April 2, 1994
- Vice Governor: Vivaldo Costa
- Preceded by: Geraldo Melo
- Succeeded by: Vivaldo Costa
- In office March 15, 1983 – May 14, 1986
- Vice Governor: Radir Pereira de Araújo
- Preceded by: Lavoisier Maia
- Succeeded by: Radir Pereira de Araújo

Mayor of Natal
- In office March 15, 1979 – May 15, 1982
- Preceded by: Vauban Bezerra
- Succeeded by: Manoel Pereira dos Santos

Personal details
- Born: José Agripino Maia; May 23, 1945 (age 81) Mossoró, Rio Grande do Norte, Brazil
- Party: UNIÃO
- Spouse: Anita Maia
- Children: Felipe

José Agripino Maia (born May 23, 1945) is a Brazilian politician. He served as governor of Rio Grande do Norte, from 1983 to 1986. He is the national president of Brazil Union (UNIÃO), and senator. He was born in Mossoró, the son of Tarcísio Maia.

== Political career ==
In 1965, Maia joins ARENA, following the footsteps of his father.

In 1974, Maia supports his father, Tarcísio Maia, for governor of Rio Grande do Norte.

In 1978, Maia supports Lavoisier Maia, for governor.

In 1979, Maia was appointed by governor Lavoisier Maia.

In 1982, Maia faces Alves and ends up winning the election, with support of governor Lavoisier Maia.

In 1984, Maia supports the name of Andrezza, who was defeated by Maluf, supported by Lavoisier Maia. Thus, Maia decides to create the Front Liberal, to support Neves.

In 1985, Maia supports Wilma Maia, for mayor, who was defeated by Filho.

In 1986, Maia supports João Faustino, who also was defeated by Geraldo Melo.

In 1989, Maia supports Collor, of the PRN, who was elected president of Brazil.

In 1990, Maia defeated Lavoisier Maia.

In 1994, Maia closes alliance PSDB–PFL, after the resignation of presidential candidacy of Lavoisier Maia, who will complete in the government, with support of Cardoso.

In 1996, Maia supports Wilma de Faria, for mayor.

In 1998, Maia applied for the governor, with support of Cardoso

In 2001, Maia breaks FHC.

In 2002, Maia supports Ciro Gomes, after Lula.

In 2008, Maia supports Micarla, for mayor, against Fátima Bezerra. Micarla went on to win the election.

In 2010, Maia was re-elected senator.

In 2014, Maia becomes general coordinator of presidential campaign of Neves.

Maia was one of the fiercest opponents of the Dilma government.

== See also ==
- List of mayors of Natal, Rio Grande do Norte
