= Romeu Italo Ripoli =

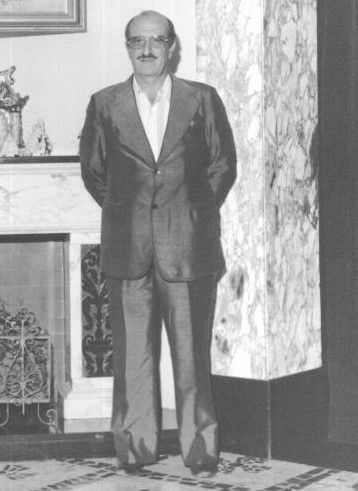

President of Esporte Clube XV de Novembro (Piracicaba)

Personal details
- Born: 21 November 1916 Piracicaba, Brazil
- Died: 28 October 1983 (aged 66) Piracicaba, Brazil
- Education: Luiz de Queiroz College of Agriculture, University of São Paulo
- Occupation: Agronomist, businessman, politician

Romeu Italo Ripoli (Piracicaba, 21 November 1916 – Piracicaba, 28 October 1983) was an agronomist, businessman, politician and sports manager. He was president of the Esporte Clube XV de Novembro (Piracicaba), soccer team of the city.

== Biography ==
=== Early life ===
Son of the humble Italian immigrants Caetano Ripoli (1866–1940) and Emilia Viccini Ripoli (1875–1972), he passed the childhood and adolescence in his native city. In 1935, he was enlisted in Brazilian Army, serving in the Piracicaba Reservists Formation Center (Tiro de Guerra).

After great effort, due to the lack of means of his family, graduated in 1940 by Luiz de Queiroz College of Agriculture, University of São Paulo (ESALQ), also located in Piracicaba. In its university period it had strong performance and work by the construction of own headquarters of Academic Center Luiz de Queiroz, which would only be fulfilled in 1963. In 1943, published the book "Forty Years of Glories", narrating the history of the Athletic Association Academic Luiz de Queiroz, between 1903 and 1943.

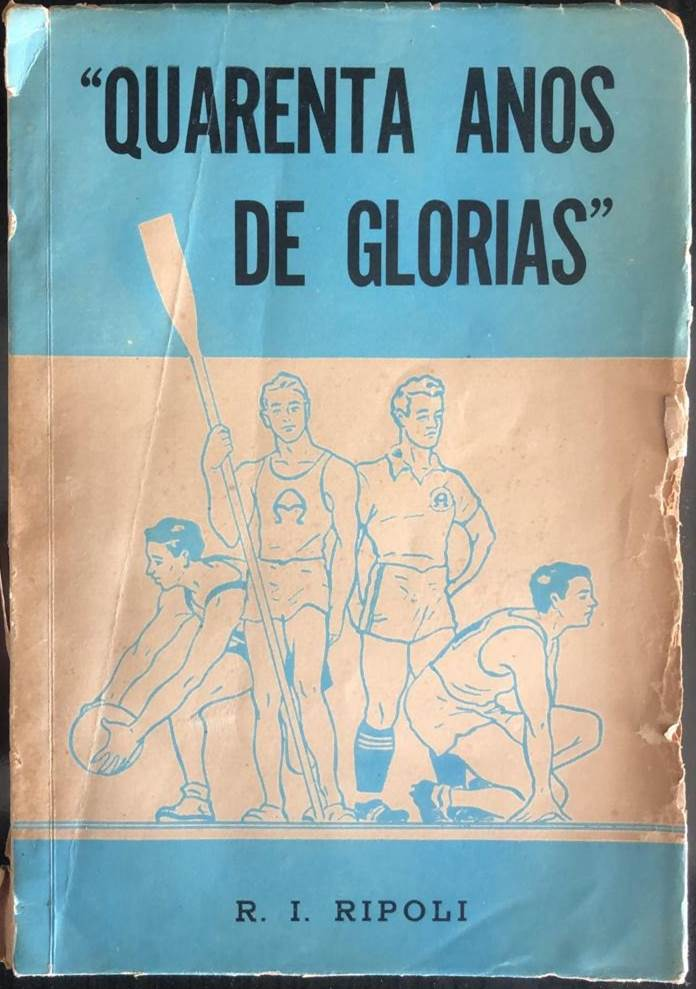
Book "Forty Years of Glories", edited by Ripoli.

After graduating from ESALQ, he was an employee of the State Department of Agriculture and a technician at the Tamoio plant, in Araraquara, owned by Pedro Morganti. He was one of those responsible for introducing the silkworm in the west of São Paulo, when he worked in the state agricultural service. He broke with the Governor Adhemar de Barros and resigned from public service because he did not agree with the use of his professional actions for political and demagogic purposes.

He directed the former Associação Atlética Luiz de Queiroz, three-time football champion in the city between 1941 and 1943. Still in the 1940s, he coordinated the construction of the stands of the XV de Novembro de Piracicaba stadium, on Regente Feijó Street, and its registered office. He presided over the Piracicabana Football League.

=== Businessman and politician ===
In 1950, he launched in the property market of Piracicaba one of the first typically residential quarters of high standard of the interior of São Paulo and the first asphalt of the city, in lands of the former farm of Pedro Rico, having as an entrepreneur partner the commander Mário Dedini, his godfather.

A visionary man, Ripoli felt the impact of the arrival of television in Brazil. He founded a small assembly company of TV sets, SOBRATEL (Sociedade Brasileira de Televisão), in order to compete with imported ones. However, it was defeated by the lobby of the import companies. With its own resources installed a TV tower in the city, to retransmit the programs of the Rede Tupi. It was the first retransmitter of television channel of Latin America, that captured the signals of the former Network Tupi of São Paulo.

In 1954, he set up a commission to build the indoor gymnasium "Waldemar Blatkauskas", so that Piracicaba could receive the Open Games of the Interior, in 1955. He also coordinated the collection of funds for the construction of the maternity ward of Santa Casa de Misericórdia de Piracicaba, the main hospital in town.

He was a councilor of the City Council of Piracicaba in the following terms: 1948 to 1951, 1952 to 1955, 1956 to 1959, 1969 to 1972. During this last term, president of that house of laws for little more than 11 months, since he was persecuted and forced to resign, on the charge of evading the Income Tax. In fact, Ripoli had filed an indictment in the lower house to point out irregularities of his former president, Francisco Antonio Coelho, accused by the press of sponsoring ghost officials. As Coelho was connected to military of the 5th Air Defense Cannons Group, of Campinas, made such a condition to press the new president. For months Ripoli was summoned to interrogations of strong psychological pressure, which led him to need to be admitted to treatment in a specialized clinic. Some time later, he received a letter from General Rubens Restell, exempting him from all charges against him.

In 1976, extremely popular, Ripoli was candidate to mayor by the National Renewal Alliance. However, due to political mistakes made, such as talking too much about his controversial ideas, he ended up losing the election and coming in third. The Prefecture of Piracicaba was the great dream not reached by him.

=== Sports director ===
However, the area in which Ripoli most stood out was like president of the Esporte Clube XV de Novembro (Piracicaba). He was at the head of the club for 17 years, in two periods: between 1959 and 1966 and then between 1973 and 1983.

In 1964, he took the XV on a tour through Europe and Asia. At that time, Brazil was already two-time world champion and only Santos and Botafogo made this type of trip. The team played in Sweden, Poland, West Germany and East Germany, Denmark and, at the height of Cold War, in the then Soviet Republics of Russia, Moldova, Ukraine, Kazakhstan and Uzbekistan.

In 1976, XV was vice champion the Paulista Football Championship, the team's greatest title to date and the first club in the interior of São Paulo to reach such a standings.

In 1979, the XV reached 13th place in the Brazilian Soccer Championship, the best placement in its history in the tournament.

Ripoli was involved in several disputes with the Federação Paulista de Futebol (FPF) in his attempts to bring benefits to clubs in the interior of São Paulo. He appeared frequently with his straw cigarette in TV sports programs to criticize judges and leaders of FPF. He was the intellectual mentor and aggregator of the clubs of the interior of São Paulo, leading to him becoming the first president of the interior for the FPF.

A victim of lung cancer, he died in 1983, shortly before his 67th birthday and XV to become champion of the second division, returning to the elite of the soccer of São Paulo.

"In his hands", Losso Netto assures us in Jornal de Piracicaba on 29 October 1983, "the veterans club lived its greatest moments of glory. An intimidating fighter, he did not compromise with injustice. In sports politics, full of malice and dishonesty, Ripoli never let the rights of his club or the little ones be taken away. That's why he was a true leader in football in São Paulo, listened to, respected, a leader of the most authentic in Brazil's most popular sport."

"Few, very few, lived like him on this earth, giving their work for its growth and projection. One of his most expressive human figures: Romeu Italo Ripoli", said journalist Losso Neto.

== Family ==
He left 4 children: with Florisbella Cannavam Ripoli (28 December 1920 – 16 February 2018), Tomaz Caetano Cannavam Ripoli (16 February 1947 – 24 February 2013), who was titular professor of the ESALQ and Elisabeth Cannavam Ripoli (2 April 1952), professional pianist and musical businesswoman; with Luíza Catharina Salla (1 January 1930), Antonio Roberto de Godoi (25 March 1957), communications engineer, researcher and entrepreneur; and with Maria Apparecida Diehl (16 May 1938), Edson Diehl Ripoli (9 December 1964), Lieutenant General of the Brazilian Army.

== Tributes ==
Piracicaba elected Ripoli as one of the personalities of the year, in 1975/1976. He received numerous diplomas and decorations. An avenue in the city is named after him, in Parque Residencial Eldorado, parallel to avenue Eurico Gaspar Dutra and close to SP-308 (Rodovia do Açúcar, Comendador Mário Dedini).
