= João Elísio Ferraz de Campos =

Brazilian politician (born 1942)

Governor of Paraná
- In office 9 May 1986 – 15 March 1987
- Preceded by: José Richa
- Succeeded by: Alvaro Dias

Vice-governor of Paraná
- In office 15 March 1983 – 9 May 1986
- Preceded by: José Hosken de Novaes
- Succeeded by: Ary Veloso Queiroz

State deputy of Paraná
- In office 1978 – 15 March 1983

Personal details
- Born: 23 December 1942 (age 82); Paranaguá, Paraná, Brazil
- Political party: ARENA (until 1982); MDB (1982–present)

João Elísio Ferraz de Campos (born 23 December 1942) is a Brazilian politician who briefly served as the governor of the state of Paraná from 1986 to 1987, having served as vice-governor from 1983 to 1987. He served after the resignation of governor José Richa in order to run for the federal senate.

Campos was born in Paranaguá, the son of João Ferraz de Campos and Edy Pereira Ferraz de Campos. He graduated with a law degree from the Pontifical Catholic University of Paraná. He had been a high-level official in both the administrations of Emílio Hoffmann Gomes and Jayme Canet Júnior. Canet Júnior was also his cousin, with whom he was also a partner with as part of the regional bank Bamerindus. Campos was elected as a state deputy from the military dictatorship era ARENA party in 1978. He maintained his connections to Canet Júnior even after switching his affiliation to the MDB during the 1982 elections. During that election cycle he was elected vice-governor of Paraná. During his time as vice-governor he was also president of the Development Bank of Paraná (BADEP) and was the state Finance Secretary.

Political offices
Preceded by José Richa	48th Governor of Paraná; 1986–1987	Succeeded by Alvaro Dias
