= Lavoisier Maia =

Brazilian physician and politician (1928–2021)

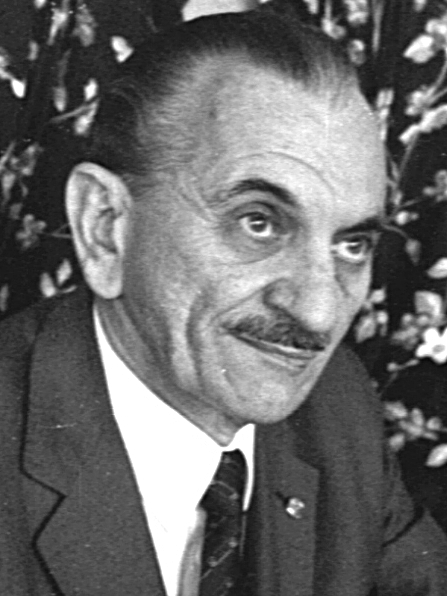
- Maia in 1988

Federal deputy from Rio Grande do Norte
- In office 1 February 1999 – 31 January 2007

Senator from Rio Grande do Norte
- In office 15 March 1987 – 31 January 1995

Governor of Rio Grande do Norte
- In office 15 March 1979 – 15 March 1983

Personal details
- Born: 9 October 1928 Catolé do Rocha, Paraíba, Brazil
- Died: 11 October 2021 (aged 93)
- Party: PSDB
- Spouse(s): Teresinha Maia (m. 1991) Wilma de Faria (m. 1959; div. 1991)
- Profession: Physician

Lavoisier Maia Sobrinho (9 October 1928 – 11 October 2021) was a Brazilian physician, Professor and politician, affiliated with the Brazilian Social Democracy Party (PSDB). He served as the 44th governor of Rio Grande do Norte, from 1979 to 1983, as well as senator, federal deputy and state deputy.

== Biographical data ==
Son of Lauro Maia and Idalina Maia. He graduated in medicine from the Federal University of Bahia with a specialization in Health Planning from the University of São Paulo and a specialization in Gynecology and Obstetrics from the Brazilian Federation of Gynecology and Obstetrics Associations (FEBRASGO). Back in Rio Grande do Norte, he continued his medical career and was a professor at the Federal University of Rio Grande do Norte, heading the Department of Obstetrics and Gynecology and director of the Januário Cicco maternity hospital. Lavoisier Maia also presided over the Dinarte Mariz Foundation for Studies and Research.

== Public life ==
During the government of his cousin Tarcísio Maia, he was state secretary of Health, a position he held simultaneously with that of president of the State Narcotics Inspection Commission of the Ministry of Health. During the same period, he was secretary of Justice. Appointed governor of Rio Grande do Norte via ARENA in 1978 by president Ernesto Geisel, he appointed his cousin José Agripino Maia mayor of Natal . After the government party was dissolved, he joined the PDS, where he was president of the regional executive and also a member of the party's national board.

In the 1982 election, he elected José Agripino Maia as his successor and after leaving the government, he was appointed advisor to the Ministry of Health in the state of Rio Grande do Norte and supported Paulo Maluf in the indirect presidential succession of 1985. That same year, his wife (from whom he would separate in early 1992), Wilma Maia, lost the election for Mayor of Natal in a dispute against Garibaldi Alves Filho. However, in 1986 the couple was victorious at the polls: he was elected senator and she federal deputy. Both joined the PDT, and soon after taking office, Wilma Maia was elected mayor of Natal in 1988.

In the following years, Lavoisier Maia tried to return to government by popular vote, being defeated by José Agripino Maia in the second round of the 1990 elections . Interestingly, the senator elected by his coalition was none other than Garibaldi Alves Filho, one of the Maia family's greatest political adversaries, who in the first round of the 1994 elections would impose a new defeat on Lavoisier Maia in the dispute for state government.

He supported Fernando Henrique Cardoso in the succession of Itamar Franco. In 1998, he was elected federal deputy for the PFL and first alternate in the 2002 elections, being confirmed at the end of this last legislature after the election of Iberê Ferreira as vice-governor of Rio Grande do Norte and in 2006 he was elected state deputy for the PSB .

Lavoisier Maia was the father of former state deputy Márcia Maia, now state president of the PDT.
