= Alencar Guimarães =

Brazilian lawyer and politician

Manuel de Alencar Guimarães

Member of the Paraná Senate
- In office 1908–1920
- Preceded by: Francisco Xavier da Silva
- Succeeded by: Affonso Alves de Camargo

Manuel de Alencar Guimarães (December 13, 1865 - September 9, 1940) best known as Alencar Guimarães was a Brazilian lawyer and politician, senator of Paraná from 1908 until 1911, and again from 1912 until 1920.
