= José Carlos da Silva Júnior =

Brazilian businessman and politician (1926–2021)

Brazil Senator
- In office 1996–1999

Vice-Governor of Paraíba
- In office 1983–1986

Personal details
- Born: 16 June 1926; Campina Grande, Paraíba, Brazil
- Died: 5 March 2021 (aged 94); São Paulo, Brazil
- Political party: PDS

José Carlos da Silva Júnior (16 June 1926 – 5 March 2021) was a Brazilian politician and businessman.

== Biography ==
He was a member of the Democratic Social Party and served as a Senator from 1996 to 1999 and Vice-Governor of the state of Paraíba from 1983 to 1986. As a businessman, he served as Director-President of Grupo São Braz, in addition to his investments in pre-owned car shops. He was also Director of the Federação das Indústrias da Paraíba and President of the Associação Brasileira da Indústria de Café. He died from COVID-19 in São Paulo, São Paulo, on 5 March 2021, at the age of 94, during the COVID-19 pandemic in Brazil.
