= Geraldo Melo =

Brazilian businessman and politician (1935–2022)

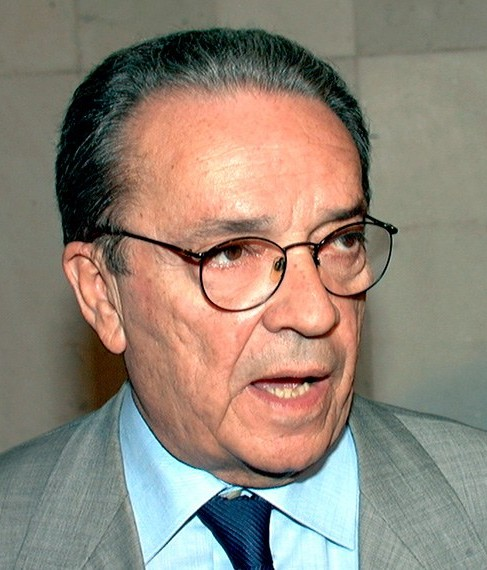

Senator for Rio Grande do Norte
- In office 1 February 1995 – 31 January 2003

Governor of Rio Grande do Norte
- In office 15 March 1987 – 15 March 1991
- Preceded by: Radir Pereira
- Succeeded by: José Agripino Maia

Vice-Governor of Rio Grande do Norte
- In office 15 March 1979 – 24 November 1982
- Preceded by: Genibaldo Barros
- Succeeded by: Radir Pereira

Personal details
- Born: Geraldo José da Câmara Ferreira de Melo; 12 July 1935; Campo Grande, Brazil
- Died: 6 March 2022 (aged 86); Natal, Brazil
- Political party: ARENA (1965–1979); PDS (1980–1985); PMDB (1985–1993); PSDB (1993–2009); PPS (2009–2011); MDB (2011–2018); PSDB (2018–2022)
- Occupation: Businessman

Geraldo José da Câmara Ferreira de Melo (12 July 1935 – 6 March 2022) was a Brazilian businessman, politician and journalist.

== Life and career ==
Geraldo worked as journalist until 1959, the year he graduated in economic development at United Nations' CEPAL. He was a founding member of Sudene, where he was appointed as head of the Basic Economic Activities department under the leadership of Celso Furtado. In 1961 he obtained a degree in economic development financing from CEMLA, in Mexico City, where he interned at the World Bank and the Inter-American Bank of Development. Later that year, Melo returned to Rio Grande do Norte to become the state's first development secretary during Aluízio Alves' government.

As a businessman, Geraldo Melo founded Adiplan, a consulting firm with offices located in Recife and at Spenser's House in London. His firm worked in partnership with the Economist Intelligence Unit and Tokyo-based Mitsou Consultants co. In the early 1970's Adiplan completed the merger and acquisition of two sugarcane mills, Usina São Francisco Açúcar e Álcool S/A and Usina Ilha Bela S/A, creating Companhia Açucareira Vale do Ceará-Mirim, one of the largest sugarcane refineries in Northeast Brazil. Melo was one of the founder of Natal's first shopping mall, Natal Shopping, as well as TV Potengi, currently known as TV Bandeirantes Rio Grande do Norte. He stepped down from executive positions held at the companies to pursue his political career.

While a member of the Brazilian Democratic Movement Party, he served as Governor of Rio Grande do Norte from 1987 to 1991. He served as Senator for Rio Grande do Norte, from 1995 to 2003, after switching to the Brazilian Social Democratic Party. During his tenure Melo was elected vice-president of the Brazilian Senate from 1997 to 2001. Geraldo represented the Brazilian Senate around the world, including at conferences at the Luxembourg Palace in Paris, and the Senate of the Republic in Rome.

Melo died of lung cancer and post COVID-19 complications in Natal on 6 March 2022, at the age of 86, during the COVID-19 pandemic in Brazil.
