= List of governors of Paraná =

This is the list of presidents and governors of the Brazilian state of Paraná.

== Imperial period (1853 — 1889) ==
#	President	From	To
1	Zacarias de Góis	1853	1855
2	Teófilo Vitório Ribeiro de Resende	1855	1855
3	Henrique Pedro Carlos de Beaurepaire-Rohan	1855	1856
4	Vicente Pires da Mota	1856	1856
5	José Antônio Vaz de Carvalhais	1856	1857
6	Francisco Liberato de Matos	1857	1859
7	Luís Francisco da Câmara Leal	1859	1859
8	José Francisco Cardoso	1859	1861
9	Antônio Barbosa Gomes Nogueira	1861	1863
10	Manuel Antônio Ferreira	1863	1863
11	Sebastião Gonçalves da Silva	1863	1864
12	José Joaquim do Carmo Júnior	1864	1864
13	André Augusto de Pádua Fleury	1864	1864
14	Agostinho Ermelino de Leão	1864	1864
15	André Augusto de Pádua Fleury	1867	1868
16	Manuel Alves de Araújo	1865	1865
17	André Augusto de Pádua Fleury	1865	1866
18	Agostinho Ermelino de Leão	1866	1866
19	Polidoro César Burlamaque	1866	1867
20	Carlos Augusto Ferraz de Abreu	1867	1867
21	José Feliciano Horta de Araújo	1867	1868
22	Carlos Augusto Ferraz de Abreu	1868	1868
23	Antônio Augusto da Fonseca	1868	1869
24	Agostinho Ermelino de Leão	1869	1869
25	Antônio Luís Afonso de Carvalho	1869	1870
26	Agostinho Ermelino de Leão	1870	1870
27	Venâncio José de Oliveira Lisboa	1870	1873
28	Manuel Antônio Guimarães	1873	1873
29	Frederico José Cardoso de Araújo Abranches	1873	1875
30	Agostinho Ermelino de Leão	1875	1875
31	Adolfo Lamenha Lins	1875	1877
32	Manuel Antônio Guimarães	1877	1877
33	Joaquim Bento de Oliveira Júnior	1877	1878
34	Jesuíno Marcondes de Oliveira e Sá	1878	1878
35	Rodrigo Otávio de Oliveira Meneses	1878	1879
36	Jesuíno Marcondes de Oliveira e Sá	1879	1879
37	Manuel Pinto de Sousa Dantas Filho	1879	1880
38	João José Pedrosa	1880	1881
39	Sancho de Barros Pimentel	1881	1882
40	Jesuíno Marcondes de Oliveira e Sá	1882	1882
41	Carlos Augusto de Carvalho	1882	1883
42	Antônio Alves de Araújo	1883	1883
43	Luís Alves Leite de Oliveira Belo	1883	1884
44	Brasílio Augusto Machado de Oliveira	1884	1885
45	Antônio Alves de Araújo	1885	1885
46	Joaquim de Almeida Faria Sobrinho	1885	1885
47	Alfredo d'Escragnolle Taunay	1885	1886
48	Joaquim de Almeida Faria Sobrinho	1886	1887
49	Joaquim de Almeida Faria Sobrinho	1887	1888
50	José Cesário de Miranda Ribeiro	1888	1888
51	Ildefonso Pereira Correia	1888	1888
52	Balbino Cândido da Cunha	1888	1889
53	Jesuíno Marcondes de Oliveira e Sá	1889	1889
54	Joaquim José Alves	1889	1889
55	Jesuíno Marcondes de Oliveira e Sá	1889	1889

== Republican period (1889 - present) ==
#	Governor	From	To
10	Francisco José Cardoso Júnior	1889	1889
11	José Marques Guimarães	1889	1890
-	Uladislau Herculano de Freitas	1890	1890
12	Américo Lobo Leite Pereira	1890	1890
-	Joaquim Monteiro de Carvalho e Silva	1890	1890
13	Serzedelo Correia	1890	1890
-	Joaquim Monteiro de Carvalho e Silva	1890	1890
14	José Cerqueira de Aguiar Lima	1890	1891
15	Generoso Marques dos Santos	1891	1891
-	Roberto Ferreira Bento/José Lamenha Lins/Joaquim Monteiro de Carvalho e Silva	1891	1892
16	Francisco Xavier da Silva	1892	1893
-	Vicente Machado da Silva Lima	1893	1894
17	Teófilo Soares Gomes	1894	1894
18	João Meneses Dória	1894	1894
19	Francisco José Cardoso Júnior	1894	1894
20	Tertuliano Teixeira de Freitas	1894	1894
21	Antônio José Ferreira Braga	1894	1894
-	Vicente Machado da Silva Lima	1894	1894
23	Francisco Xavier da Silva	1894	1896
24	Santos Andrade	1896	1899
25	José Bernardino Bormann	1899	1899
26	Santos Andrade	1899	1900
27	Francisco Xavier da Silva	1900	1904
28	Vicente Machado da Silva Lima	1904	1906
29	João Cândido Ferreira	1906	1907
30	Joaquim Monteiro de Carvalho e Silva	1907	1908
31	Manuel de Alencar Guimarães	1908	1908
32	Francisco Xavier da Silva	1908	1912
33	Carlos Cavalcanti de Albuquerque	1912	1916
34	Afonso Camargo	1916	1920
35	Caetano Munhoz da Rocha	1920	1924
36	Caetano Munhoz da Rocha	1924	1928
37	Afonso Camargo	1928	1930
38	Mário Alves Monteiro Tourinho	1930	1931
-	João Perneta	1931	1932
39	Manuel Ribas	1932	1945
	Clotário de Macedo Portugal	1945	1946
40	Brasil Pinheiro Machado	1946	1946
41	Mário Gomes da Silva	1946	1947
42	Antônio Augusto de Carvalho Chaves	1947	1947
43	Moisés Lupion	1947	1951
44	Bento Munhoz da Rocha Neto	1951	1955
-	Antonio Annibelli	1955	1955
45	Adolfo de Oliveira Franco	1955	1956
46	Moisés Lupion	1956	1961
47	Nei Braga	1961	1965
-	Antônio Ferreira Rüppel	1965	1965
48	Algacir Guimarães	1965	1966
49	Paulo Cruz Pimentel	1966	1971
50	Haroldo Leon Peres	1971	1971
	Pedro Viriato Parigot de Sousa	1971	1973
51	João Mansur	1973	1973
52	Emílio Hoffmann Gomes	1973	1975
53	Jaime Canet Júnior	1975	1979
54	Nei Braga	1979	1982
55	José Hosken de Novaes	1982	1983
56	José Richa	1983	1986
57	João Elísio Ferraz de Campos	1986	1987
58	Alvaro Dias	1987	1991
59	Roberto Requião de Mello e Silva	1991	1994
60	Mário Pereira	1994	1995
61	Jaime Lerner	1995	2003
62	Roberto Requião de Mello e Silva	2003	2006
63	Hermas Eurides Brandão	2006	2007
-	Roberto Requião de Mello e Silva	2007	2010
64	Orlando Pessuti	2010	2011
65	Carlos Alberto "Beto" Richa	2011	2018
66	Cida Borghetti	2018	2019
69	Ratinho Júnior	2019	present
