= Pera (surname) =

Pera is the surname of:

- Abel Pêra (1891–1975), Portuguese-Brazilian actor
- Albano Pera (born 1950), Italian sports shooter
- Alfredo Le Pera (1900–1935), Argentinean journalist, lyricist to Carlos Gardel
- Bernarda Pera (born 1994), Croatian-American tennis player
- Decimus Junius Pera, Roman politician
- Edgar Pêra (born 1960), Portuguese cinematographer
- Florentin Pera (born 1979), Romanian handball manager
- Joe Pera (born 1988), American comedian, writer and actor
- Manuel Pêra (1894–1967), Portuguese-Brazilian actor
- Marcello Pera (born 1943), Italian philosopher and politician
- Marcus Junius Pera (fl. 230–216 BC), Roman politician
- Marília Pêra (1943–2015), Brazilian actress
- Patrick Péra (born 1949), French figure skater
- Pia Pera (1956–2016), Italian novelist, essayist, and translator
- Radames Pera (born 1960), American actor
- Renee Reijo Pera, American stem cell biologist
- Riccardo Pera (born 1999), Italian racing driver
- Robert Pera (born 1978), American entrepreneur, owner of Memphis Grizzlies
- Sam Nunuke Pera (born 1969), retired Cook Islands weightlifter
- Sam Pera, Jr. (born 1989), Cook Islands weightlifter
- Sandra Pêra (born 1954), Brazilian actress, singer and theater director
- Scott Pera (born 1967), American college basketball coach
- Sirla Pera (born 1992), Cook Islands weightlifter
