= Zezé Macedo =

Brazilian actress

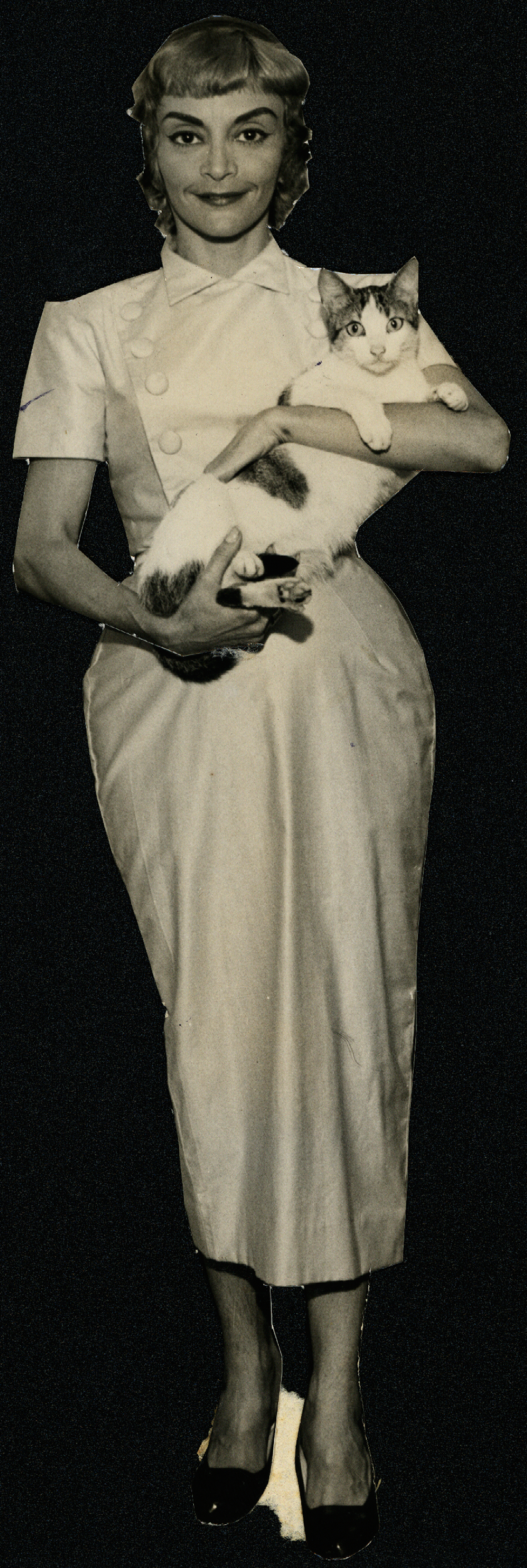
- Macedo in 1957
- Born: Maria José de Macedo; 6 May 1916; Silva Jardim, Rio de Janeiro, Brazil
- Died: 8 October 1999 (Aged 83); Rio de Janeiro, Brazil
- Occupation(s): Television and film actress
- Known for: Comedy roles
- Spouse(s): 1. Alcides Manhães, 2. Vasco Lino Magalhães, 3. Victor Zambito

Zezé Macedo (6 May 1916 – 8 October 1999) was a Brazilian comedienne and actress in radio, cinema and television, being the female record holder in Brazil for film appearances, having made over 100 films. She also published four books of poetry.

== Early life ==
Maria José de Macedo was born in Silva Jardim in the Brazilian state of Rio de Janeiro on 6 May 1916. Her stepfather, Columbano Santos, was a notary and the local mayor as well as being a great supporter of the theatre. Her theatrical debut was at the age of four. As she could not read, she memorized the lines by listening to them read by her stepfather. At the age of fifteen, she married a mechanic and electrician, Alcides Manhães, giving up being an actress and moving to Niterói. They had a son who died at just one year of age when he fell from his paternal grandmother's lap and fractured his skull. Upon learning of her son's death, she gave a huge cry and was then silent for a long time, suffering shock. When she spoke again her voice had changed: it was completely hoarse and would remain that way for the rest of her life. The couple broke up shortly after their son's death and Macedo started working as a clerk at her stepfather's office.

== Radio and television ==
Through her stepfather's connections, she began to read her poems on the Grande Jornal Fluminense, a show broadcast on Sundays by Rádio Tamoio. In 1944, she wrote and read stories of Brazil's participation in World War II. She became the secretary of the scriptwriter Dias Gomes and the actor Rodolfo Mayer for three years and, at the same time, gradually began to appear on radio shows, in plays and reading poems. In 1954, she published her first book of poetry, Coração Profano (Profane Heart), which was a great success. She would go on to publish three more books of poetry. Replacing another actress in a recording when the actress did not turn up, she came to the attention of the screenwriter and actor, Paulo Porto, who gave her the opportunity to start appearing on television. Her first performance was in the comedy programme Mesa Quadrada (1953), a satire of the football programmes on television. Macedo was thin and short with big eyes and a mocking expression, and this led to her nearly always being subsequently chosen for comedy roles, frequently as a maid, despite her wish to play more dramatic roles in television soap operas.

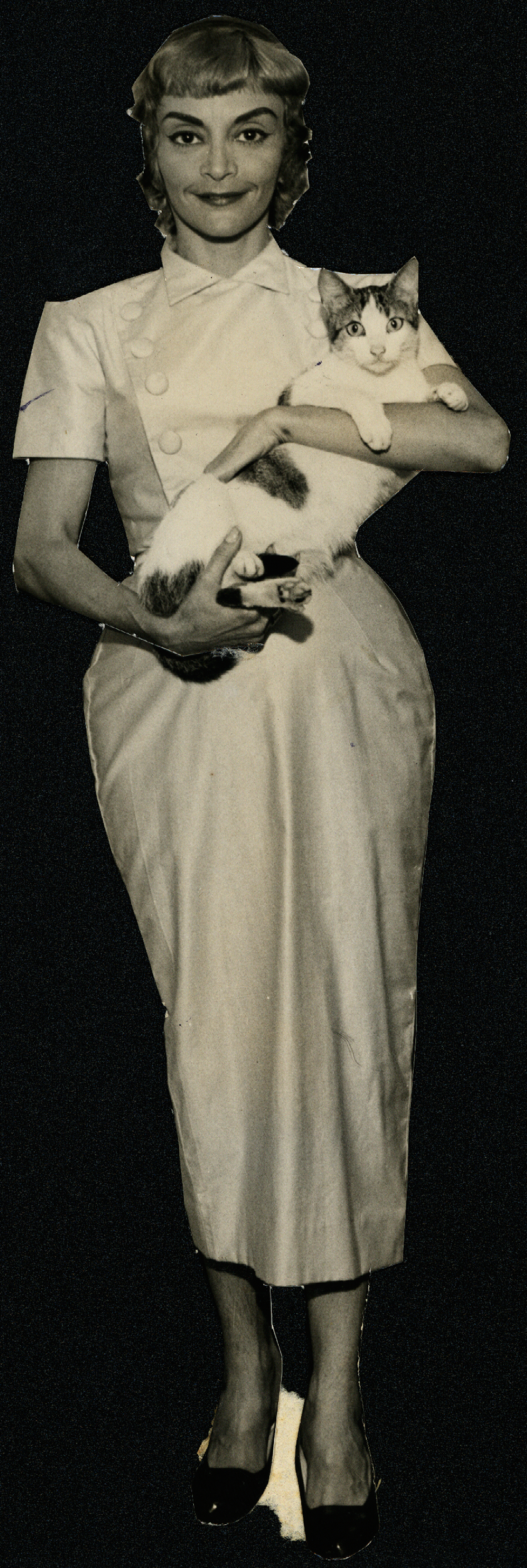
Macedo in 1957

== Cinema ==
Through her poetry and appearances on radio and television she came to the attention of the screenwriter and director, Watson Macedo, and appeared in the films Warning to the Sailors (1950) and The Oil is Ours (O Petróleo É Nosso– 1954). From then on, Zezé Macedo became a strong presence in the cinema, acting for several production companies and still mainly playing humorous roles. Among the films she participated in were De Vento em Popa (1957), directed by Carlos Manga, in which she plays an opera singer, escaping from the role of a maid for a change; O Homem do Sputnik (1959), considered by moviegoers as one of the best chanchadas, a type of film that satirised Hollywood movies, and Esse Milhão É Meu (1959). In these three films, she played alongside the comedy actor Oscarito, who insisted that she perform with him. She also worked with the actor Grande Otelo. However, although she performed in many chanchadas, she never had a starring role.

With the decline of the chanchada in the early 1960s, Macedo began to dedicate herself more to theatre and television, while continuing to make films. From 1965, she was hired by TV Globo, for which she would act until the end of her life. In the 1970s, her film career was boosted with the emergence of pornochanchadas, which were a type of sex comedy that stopped short of being pornographic. Meanwhile, on television, she began a partnership with Chico Anysio, which resulted in her two most famous characters: Biscoito, the ugly but rich wife of a drunk; and Dona Bela, a student.

== Later years ==
Towards the end of her life Macedo began to reduce her workload, devoting herself more and more to television. In 1983, she starred as the protagonist in a satire for children on Steven Spielberg's E.T. the Extra-Terrestrial. Three years later, she won a special award from the jury at the Festival de Gramado for her performance in Ivan Cardoso's As Sete Vampiras (The Seven Vampires). Her last feature film was Ivan Cardoso's The Scarlet Scorpion in 1990.

== Private life ==
Macedo was married to the actor, Vasco Lino Magalhães, for a decade from 1950. In 1961, she married the actor and singer Victor Zambito, ten years her junior. The two remained together for 38 years, until Macedo's death.

== Death ==
On 26 August 1999, Macedo suffered a stroke and was admitted to a clinic in Rio de Janeiro. She died on 9 October 1999. In 2012 her life was portrayed in the play A Revenge of the Mirror: the Story of Zezé Macedo, written by Flávio Marinho and starring Betty Gofman.

== Awards ==
Festival de Gramado

- 1996: Prêmio Especial do Júri, Kikito de Ouro, for her work in As Sete Vampiras

== Filmography ==
=== Film ===
Year	Title	Role
1999	Parceiros & Palermas	Prostitute
1990	O Escorpião Escarlate	Housekeeper
1988	Fogo e Paixão	Socialite
1988	Natal da Portela	Maria Elisa
1988	O Casamento dos Trapalhões	D. Marieta
1988	O Diabo na Cama	Prostitute
1986	As Sete Vampiras	Rina
1985	O Rei do Rio	—
1984	Os Bons Tempos Voltaram: Vamos…	Grandma
1983	Etéia	Etéia
1980	Ele, Ela, Quem?	Madame Grignac
1979	A Virgem Camuflada	Spinster
1978	O Erótico Virgem	Eulália
1977	Secas e Molhadas	—
1977	As Eróticas Profissionais	Tosca
1976	Sete Mulheres Para Um Homem Só	Dudu
1976	Gordos e Magros	Virgin Mary
1976	Pedro Bó, o Caçador de Cangaceiros	Maria Feiosa
1975	Com as Calças na Mão	Dying
1975	O Monstro de Santa Teresa	Spinster
1975	O Padre Que Queria Pecar	—
1975	As Loucuras de um Sedutor	Margarida
1974	Robin Hood, o Trapalhão da Floresta	Organist
1974	Onanias o Poderoso Machão	Cibele
1974	Oh Que Delícia de Patrão	Crazy
1974	As Mulheres Que Fazem Diferente	Widow
1973	Tati	Dona Aurora
1973	Os Mansos	Old
1973	Como É Boa Nossa Empregada	Maid
1973	Mais ou Menos Virgem	Adélia
1972	Salve-se Quem Puder - Rally da Juventude	Client
1970	Os Monstros de Babaloo	Family woman
1969	Macunaíma	Mother
1966	As Cariocas	Jealous woman
1965	Lana, Queen of the Amazons	—
1964	O Santo Módico	—
1962	Três Colegas de Batina	Caixa Econômica's employee
1960	Minervina Vem Aí	Melita
1960	Cala a Boca, Etelvina	Pancrácia
1960	Virou Bagunça	Biluca
1959	Dona Xepa	Camila
1959	Esse Milhão é Meu	Augusta
1959	O Homem do Sputnik	Cleci
1958	O Camelô da Rua Larga	Possidônia
1958	Aguenta o Rojão	—
1958	E o Espetáculo Continua	Prudência
1958	É de Chuá!	Biluca
1958	A Grande Vedete	Fifina
1957	De Vento em Popa	Madame Frou-Frou
1957	Treze Cadeiras	—
1957	Rio Fantasia	Pension maid
1957	Rico Ri à Toa	Maid
1957	Maluco por Mulher	—
1957	Garotas e Samba	Inocência
1957	Tem Boi na Linha	—
1956	Quem Sabe, Sabe!	—
1956	Tira a Mão Daí!	—
1955	Trabalhou Bem, Genival	—
1955	Carnaval em Marte	Justina
1955	Sinfonia Carioca	Faustina
1955	O Feijão É Nosso	—
1954	O Petróleo é Nosso	Young girl with the phone
1950	Aviso aos navegantes	Young girl

=== Television ===
Year	Title	Role	Notes
1999	Zorra Total	Dona Bela	(Segment: Escolinha do Professor Raimundo)
1996	Chico Total	Biscoito	
1992	Os Trapalhões	Olive Oyl (segment: Agência Trapa Tudo)	Special participation
1991	Estados Anysios de Chico City	Various characters	
1990–1993	Escolinha do Professor Raimundo	Dona Bela	
1986	Cambalacho	Room maid	Special participation
1983-1990	Chico Anysio Show	Biscoito / Dona Bela / Various characters	
1977-1982	Sítio do Pica Pau Amarelo	Dona Carochinha	
1973–1976	Chico City	Various characters	
1973	João da Silva	—	
1972	O Primeiro Amor	Astúria	
1968–1970	Balança Mas Não Cai	Various characters	
1965	Padre Tião	Jacqueline	
1965	A Moreninha	Zezé	
1965	Bairro Feliz	Various characters	1965–1966
1953	Mesa Quadrada	—	

== Bibliography ==
- Oração Profana (1954)
- Uma Estrela Caiu (1981)
- Meu Breviário (1981)
- A Menina do Gato (1997)
