= ...And the World Laughs =

- Directed by: Watson Macedo
- Written by: Watson Macedo
- Starring: Grande Otelo, Oscarito, Eliana Macedo, Alberto Ruschel
- Release date: 1948
- Running time: 90 minutes
- Country: Brazil
- Language: Portuguese

...And the World Laughs is a 1948 Brazilian musical and comedy film directed by Watson Macedo. According to the Dicionário de Filmes Brasileiros (Brazilian Film Dictionary), organized by Antonio Leão, it marks "the moment when Watson Macedo begins to chart the path of what came to be called musical chanchada."

According to O Cruzeiro magazine, "The main flaw of this Atlântida production is in the script. And this is mainly what irritates the most in national cinema. Since there were possibilities to present a technically acceptable show, why use such a disjointed story, a mere pretext to showcase some musical numbers with the inevitable radio artists of our time?"

The film is also referred to as And the World Has Fun (a more literal translation of the original Portuguese title, ...E o mundo se diverte.)

== Plot ==
A theater typist facing financial crisis is mistakenly diagnosed with only a short time left to live because a mix-up at the clinic exchanged his X-ray with that of another patient. His colleagues decide to fulfill all his wishes to give him a "happy end". The typist's dream is to produce a revista, which no one believes in, but paradoxically ends up saving the theater from bankruptcy. In the end, the mix-up is discovered, and the theater janitor marries the theater director's daughter.

== Cast ==
The main cast of the film includes:

- Oscarito as Pacheco, the theater janitor.
- Grande Otelo as Aparício, the theater custodian.
- Modesto de Souza as Damião, the theater director.
- Eliana Macedo as Neusa, the director's daughter.
- Alberto Ruschel as Alberto, the "ill" typist.
- Humberto Catalano as Firmino, the director's assistant who conspires against him.
- Madame Lou as Madame Valentim.

== Musical numbers ==
The film features the following musical numbers:

- Grito de guerra: with Oscarito and newspaper characters; composer: Arnaldo Figueiredo.
- Abandonado: with Quitandinha Serenaders; composer: Pepe Aguero.
- Favorita do Sultão: with Araci Costa; composers: Nássara and J. Batista.
- Pegando Fogo: with Chuca Chuca and his Ensemble; composers: José Maria de Abreu and Francisco Mattoso.
- La Reina: with Ruy Rey; composers: Rutinaldo and Ruy Rey.
- Jacarepaguá: with Vocalistas Tropicais; composers: Paquito, Romeu Gentil and Marino Pinto.
- Falam de Mim: with Acadêmicos do Salgueiro; composers: E. Silva and N. Oliveira.
- Tempo de Criança: with Adelaide Chiozzo; composers: Ely Turquini and João de Souza.
- Que Mentira que Lorota Boa: with Luiz Gonzaga; composers: Humberto Teixeira and Luiz Gonzaga.
- Ave sem Nunho: with Horacina Corrêa; composers: Luiz Soberano and Osvaldo Fonseca.
- Espanhola Diferente: with Ruy Rey; composers: Nássara and Peterpan.
- Tabuleiro da Baiana: with Eliana and Quitandinha Serenaders; composer: Ary Barroso.

== Reception ==
The film was noted for the use of a plot device that consists of swapping the attributes of opposite types of characters (male/female voices; dead/healthy person's x-ray sheets).
