= Cris (footballer, born 1984) =

Portuguese footballer

Personal information
- Full name: Bruno Cristiano Conceição Carvalho Santos
- Date of birth: 17 January 1984 (age 42)
- Place of birth: Fajões, Portugal
- Height: 1.78 m (5 ft 10 in)
- Position: Midfielder

Youth career
- 1993–1995: Guisande
- 1995–1996: Feirense
- 1996–1997: Guisande
- 1997–2003: Feirense

Senior career*
Years	Team	Apps	(Gls)
2003–2007	Feirense	102	(2)
2007–2010	Académica	77	(5)
2010–2011	Asteras Tripolis	9	(1)
2011–2012	Feirense	14	(0)
2012–2013	AEP	15	(0)
2013–2021	Feirense	181	(3)
Total		398	(11)
- * Club domestic league appearances and goals

Bruno Cristiano Conceição Carvalho Santos (born 17 January 1984 in Fajões, Oliveira de Azeméis), known as Cris, is a Portuguese former professional footballer who played as a midfielder.
