= Bird of Paradise (album) =

Studio album by Djavan
- Released: 1988
- Genre: Samba
- Label: Columbia
- Producer: Ronnie Foster

Djavan chronology
Não é Azul Mas é Mar (1987)	Bird of Paradise (1988)	Djavan Puzzle of Hearts (1989)

Bird of Paradise is an album by the Brazilian musician Djavan. It was released in 1988 via Columbia Records, part of a Brazilian push by the label that also included albums by Milton Nascimento (Yauaretê) and Simone (Vicio).

== Production ==
The album was produced by Ronnie Foster. Three of its songs are sung in English; Djavan had others write the lyrics to them. Djavan recorded the album in Los Angeles, using session musicians.

"Stephen's Kingdom", to which Stevie Wonder contributed, is about the South African township of Soweto.

== Critical reception ==
Professional ratings
Review scores
Source	Rating
AllMusic	4.5/5 stars
The Encyclopedia of Popular Music	3/5 stars
MusicHound World: The Essential Album Guide	3/5 stars
The Rolling Stone Album Guide	4/5 stars

The Sun Sentinel wrote that Djavan's "voice is a clear, strong, masculine baritone, his guitar distinctly grounded in but not enslaved to the samba beat, the melodies are long, lilting, undulating lines rising above a plush, complex harmonic carpet." The Boston Globe thought that "Djavan's upbeat Anglo-Brazilian pop will appeal to West Coast jazz fusion fans as well as pop listeners."

The Washington Post determined that, "as slick and predictable as it is, though, the album is redeemed by a few of Djavan's lyrics, including the compulsive love song 'Madness' and the temptress tale 'Miss Susanna'." The New York Times concluded that, "as a singer, Djavan doesn't have the angelic, impeccable intonation of Mr. Nascimento or Mr. [Caetano] Veloso; he sounds a little more fallible and earthly, perhaps more approachable for American pop listeners." The Philadelphia Inquirer deemed the album "predictable, Westernized funk."

AllMusic called the album "full of strong, haunting, lusciously melodic songs often backed by that gently jumping, uplifting rhythm that runs through much of his material."

== Track listing ==
No.	Title	Length
1.	"Carnaval in Rio (Carnaval no Rio)"
2.	"Bird of Paradise"
3.	"Apple (Maçã)"
4.	"Real"
5.	"Madness (Doidice)"
6.	"Stephen's Kingdom"
7.	"Bouquet"
8.	"Take Me (Me Leve)"
9.	"I Will, I Won't (Dou-Não-Dou)"
10.	"Miss Susanna"
