= O Santo Mestiço =

- Genre: Telenovela
- Created by: Glória Magadan
- Directed by: Fábio Sabag
- Country of origin: Brazil
- Original language: Portuguese
- No. of episodes: 90

Production
- Running time: 30 minutes

Original release
- Network: TV Globo
- Release: 12 February – 14 June 1968

Related
- Padre Tião; A Grande Mentira

O Santo Mestiço is a Brazilian telenovela produced and broadcast by TV Globo. It premiered on 12 February 1968 and ended on 14 June 1968, with a total of 90 episodes. It was the fourth "novela das sete" to be aired in the timeslot. It was created by Glória Magadan and directed by Fábio Sabag, produced in black-and-white. The telenovela marked the return of the time slot following the end of Padre Tião in 1966.

Due to the reuse of tapes, the telenovela is completely lost.

== Plot ==
The telenovela was based on the true story of Saint Martin de Porres, a Dominican friar born in Peru and the first South American to be canonized by the Catholic Church in 1962 by Pope John XXIII.

In the plot, Martín de Porres is Father Ramiro, a charitable Christian committed to preaching the Church’s doctrines. A dictatorship takes hold in the fictional nation where he lives, and the Dominican friar faces severe religious persecution, but he resists and remains in the country to help the faithful.

Among his persecutors is Isabel, another important character in the story. She is a determined woman who works as a lieutenant in a women’s militia. A complete nonbeliever, she believes that religion poses a threat to the dictatorship. She lives with her mother, Caroliny, and is engaged to Gerardo, a doctor and activist.

== Cast ==
Actor	Character
Sérgio Cardoso	Martinho de Porres/Padre Ramiro
Rosamaria Murtinho	Tenente Isabel
Edney Giovenazzi	Gerardo
Dina Lisboa	Caroliny
Turíbio Ruiz	Tenório
Thaís Portinho	Clara Lee
Germano Filho	Coronel Eurípedes Pinto
Wanda Lacerda	Madre Emanuella
Luiz Pini	Felipe
Celso Marques	Crispim
Ivete Bonfá	Lúcia
Isabella Cerqueira	Tina
João Carlos Nascimento	Heitor
