= Malásia =

Studio album by Djavan
- Released: 1996
- Studio: Impressão Digital (Rio de Janeiro)
- Genres: MPB; jazz; samba
- Length: 53:45
- Language: Portuguese
- Label: Epic
- Producer: Djavan

Djavan chronology
Coisa de Acender (1992)	Malásia (1996)	Matizes (2007)

Malásia is the twelfth album by Brazilian singer and songwriter Djavan. It was released in 1996.

The album opens with the song "O Que foi My Love?", a jazz accelerated ending in the form of blues; "Sêca", which talks about the drought in northeastern jungle; "Nem Um Dia" biggest hit of the album on the radio FM to come to the soundtrack of the telenovela "Por Amor" in 1997, "Não Deu", where as a songwriter Djavan embodies the feminine soul to compose the song, "Deixa O Sol Sair", which is based on samba, "Tenha Calma" which had already been made for over a decade, and performed by Maria Bethânia, and "Não Deu", another with a self-lyrical female. The last three songs are cover versions or versions of other songs: "Coração Leviano" is a remake of a successful samba composer Paulinho da Viola, "Sorri (Smile)" is a remake of the song "Smile" by Charlie Chaplin, and "Correnteza" is a remake of a song by Tom Jobim, Luiz Bonfá partnered with.

== Track listing ==
1. Que Foi My Love? (Djavan)
2. Seca (Djavan)
3. Nem um dia... (Djavan)
4. Não Deu... (Djavan)
5. Deixa o sol sair (Djavan)
6. Tenha calma (Djavan)
7. Irmã de Neon (Djavan)
8. Cordilheira (Djavan)
9. Malásia (Djavan)
10. Coração Leviano (Paulinho da Viola)
11. Sorri (Smile) (Charles Chaplin/Geoffrey Parsons/John Turner/Version: João de Barro)
12. Correnteza (Tom Jobim/Luiz Bonfá)

== Credits ==
Fingerprint Recorded in the studio (RJ) May–August 1996

- Wizards Studio: Marco Hoffer, Hoffer Marcelo (load), Mark Vicente
- Musical Production Assistant: Paul Calasans
- Assistant coach: Geraldo Tavares
- Cover and Graphic Coordination: Carlos Nunes
- Photos: Milton Montenegro
- Recording Engineer: Rudy Gama, Enrico De Paoli
- Mixing Engineer: Enrico De Paoli
- Mastering: Ricardo Garcia
- Production and Fittings: Djavan
- Executive Producer: Mara Rabello

Musicians

- Drums: Carlos Bala
- Bass Arthur Maia
- Flute saxophone Soprano Sax Tenor Sax: Marcelo Martins
- Percussion: Armando Marçal
- Piano and keyboard s: Djavan
- Trumpet Walmir Gil
- Violin: Mariana Isdebski; Rick Amado
- Viola: Jairo Diniz
- Guitar Thumper and Vocal Djavan

== Certifications ==
Certifications for "Malásia"
Region	Certification	Certified units/sales
Brazil (Pro-Música Brasil)	Platinum	250,000^{‡}
^{‡} Sales+streaming figures based on certification alone.
