= Lilás =

Studio album by Djavan
- Released: 1984
- Label: Discos CBS
- Producer: Erich Bulling

Djavan chronology
Luz (1982)	Lilás (1984)	Não É Azul Mas É Mar (1987)

Lilás (Purple) is the sixth album by Brazilian singer and songwriter Djavan. It was released in 1984.

== Track listing ==
1. "Lilás" – 4:43
2. "Infinito" – 5:19
3. "Esquinas" – 5:31
4. "Transe" – 4:54
5. "Obi" – 4:44
6. "Miragem" – 3:54
7. "Iris" – 3:44
8. "Canto da Lira" – 4:24
9. "Liberdade" – 4:18
