= Padre Tião =

- Genre: Telenovela
- Created by: Moysés Weltman
- Directed by: Otávio Graça Mello
- Starring: Marília Pêra
- Country of origin: Brazil
- Original language: Portuguese
- No. of episodes: 50

Production
- Running time: 30 minutes

Original release
- Network: TV Globo
- Release: 12 December 1965 – 17 February 1966

Related
- A Moreninha; O Santo Mestiço

Padre Tião is a Brazilian telenovela produced and broadcast by TV Globo. It premiered on 12 December 1965 and ended on 17 February 1966, with a total of 50 episodes. It was the third "novela das sete" to be aired on the timeslot. It was created by Moysés Weltman and directed by Otávio Graça Mello.

== Cast ==
Actor	Character
Ítalo Rossi	Padre Tião
Iracema de Alencar	Vovó Santana
Marília Pêra	Cidinha
Gracindo Júnior	Júnior
Sérgio Britto	Tom
Yara Sarmento	Honestidade
Milton Gonçalves	Negrão
Zezé Macedo	Jacqueline
Milton Carneiro	Seu Romeu
Cláudia Martins	Natália
Otávio Graça Mello	Heleno
