= Rosinha do Sobrado =

Brazilian telenovela

- Genre: Telenovela
- Created by: Moysés Weltman
- Directed by: Otávio Graça Mello
- Starring: Marília Pêra
- Country of origin: Brazil
- Original language: Portuguese
- No. of episodes: 50

Production
- Running time: 50 minutes

Original release
- Network: TV Globo
- Release: 3 August – 22 October 1965

Related
- A Moreninha

Rosinha do Sobrado is a Brazilian telenovela produced and broadcast by TV Globo. It premiered on 8 August 1965 and ended on 22 October 1965, with a total of 50 episodes. It's the first "novela das sete" to be aired in the timeslot. It was created by Moysés Weltman and directed by Otávio Graça Mello.

== Cast ==
Actor	Character
Marília Pêra	Rosinha
Gracindo Júnior	Afonso
Milton Carneiro	Seu Abílio
Yara Sarmento	Aninha
Milton Gonçalves	Agenor
Zilka Salaberry	Maria
Ítalo Rossi	Décio
Iracema de Alencar	Jerusa
Lafayette Galvão	Bento
Lícia Magna	Martina
Nestor de Montemar	José
