= A Voz, o Violão, a Música de Djavan =

A Voz e o Violão

Studio album by Djavan
- Released: 1976
- Length: 35:26
- Label: Som Livre

Djavan (also known by its subtitle, A Voz, O Violão, A Música de Djavan) is the debut album by Brazilian singer and songwriter Djavan. It was released in 1976. The album features some of the singer's early hits, like "Flor de Lis," "Para-Raio," "E Que Deus Ajude" and "Fato Consumado".

== Reception ==
The AllMusic review by Alvaro Neder awarded the album 4 1/2 stars, stating "The highlights are the wonderful melodies, the musical sonority of his lyrics (it even doesn't matter if you understand them, as his focus is on its musicality), the smart violão of Djavan, and the rich rhythmic interplay between voice and violão. All of the compositions are great, exploring from samba to baião, and, more importantly, it's mostly an acoustic band album, with cool touches of a Rhodes."

Professional ratings
Review scores
Source	Rating
AllMusic	4.5/5 stars

== Track listing ==
All tracks are written by Djavan

Side A
No.	Title	Length
1.	"Flor de Lis"	3:45
2.	"Na Boca do Beco"	2:04
3.	"Maçã do Rosto"	3:15
4.	"Para-Raio"	2:28
5.	"E Que Deus Ajude"	3:02
6.	"Quantas Voltas Dá Meu Mundo"	3:33

Side B
No.	Title	Length
7.	"Maria das Mercedes"	2:52
8.	"Muito Obrigado"	3:06
9.	"Embola Bola"	2:31
10.	"Fato Consumado"	2:32
11.	"Magia"	2:58
12.	"Ventos do Norte"	3:20

== Personnel ==
- Altamiro Carrilho – flute
- Marciso "Pena" Carvalho – graphic coordinator
- Aloysio de Oliveira – executive producer
- Edson – keyboards
- Edson Frederico – arranger
- Helinho – guitar
- Hermes – rhythm
- Armando Marçal – rhythm
- Ariovaldo Contesini Paulinho – drums
- Sergio Seabra – mastering
- Victor – mixing, technician
