= Marília Pêra =

Brazilian actress

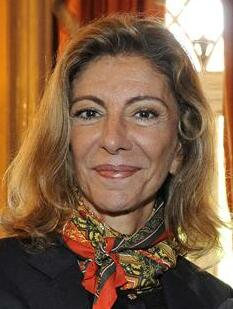
- Pêra in 2012
- Born: Marília Soares Pêra; 22 January 1943; Rio de Janeiro, Brazil
- Died: 5 December 2015 (aged 72); Rio de Janeiro, Brazil
- Occupations: Actress; singer; stage director
- Years active: 1948–2015
- Spouses: Paulo Graça Mello (separated) Agildo Ribeiro (sep. 1968) Paulo Villaça (m. 1969; sep. 1971) Nelson Motta (m. 1972; div. 1980) Bruno Faria (m. 1998)
- Children: 3
- Parents: Manuel Pêra (father); Dinorah Marzullo (mother)
- Relatives: Sandra Pêra (sister); Abel Pêra (uncle)
- Website: mariliapera.com.br

Marília Soares Pêra (22 January 1943 – 5 December 2015) was a Brazilian actress, singer and theater director. Throughout her career, she won around 80 awards, acting in 49 plays, 29 telenovelas and more than 20 films.

== Career ==
Daughter of Portuguese actor Manuel Pêra and actress of Italian descent Dinorah Marzullo, Pêra stepped onto a theater stage for the first time at the age of four, alongside her parents, who were part of the cast of Henriette Morineau's company.

From the age of 14 to 21, she worked as a dancer and participated in musicals and revues, including Minha Querida Lady (1962), starring Bibi Ferreira. According to Pêra, she passed because the directors were looking for someone who could do stunts, which was rare at that time. She also acted in other plays such as O Teu Cabelo Não Nega (1963), a biography of Lamartine Babo, in the role of Carmen Miranda. She would return to play the role of the singer in the show A Pequena Notável (1966), directed by Ary Fontoura; at A Tribute to Carmen Miranda at Lincoln Center, New York (1975), directed by Nelson Motta; in the only performance A Pêra da Carmem, at Canecão, in 1986, and in the musical Marília Pêra canta Carmen Miranda (2005), directed by Maurício Sherman.

In 1964, Pêra defeated Elis Regina in an audition for the musical Como Vencer na Vida sem Fazer Força, both still unknown to the public at the time.

Her first appearance on television was in Rosinha do Sobrado, on Rede Globo, in 1965 and then in A Moreninha. In 1967 she made her first performance in a musical show, A Úlcera de Ouro, by Hélio Bloch.

In the 1960s, she was arrested during the performance of Chico Buarque's play Roda Viva (1968) and forced to run naked through a Polish corridor (i.e. run the gauntlet). She was arrested a second time, as she was considered a communist, when police invaded her house, scaring everyone, including her seven-year-old son, who was sleeping.

In 1969, she achieved great success in the role of the protagonist in the drama Fala Baixo Senão Eu Grito, by Leilah Assumpção, directed by Clóvis Bueno, the first play by the São Paulo playwright. For her interpretation of the complex character Mariazinha, a virgin spinster who lives in a boarding house for nuns, Pêra received the Molière Award and also the Award from the São Paulo Association of Theater Critics (APCT), currently the São Paulo Association of Art Critics (APCA). Her future husband Paulo Villaça played a thief who one night jumps out of her bedroom window with the intention of stealing. In the conversation between the two, which lasts all night, the spinster reveals her frustrations to the public and to herself.

In 1975, she recorded the LP Feiticeira, released by Som Livre.

Pêra was the actress who performed most alone on stage, managing to attract children to the difficult art of the monologue. In addition to Carmen Miranda, she played on screen and on stage the roles of famous women, such as Maria Callas, Dalva de Oliveira, Coco Chanel and the former first lady of Brazil Sarah Kubitschek. Her debut as a director took place in 1978, in the play A Menina e o Vento, by Maria Clara Machado.

In 1992, she presented the musical Elas por Elas, for TV Globo. Alongside singer Simone and Cláudia Raia, they made public their support for then presidential candidate Fernando Collor de Mello in the 1989 elections.

In a statement made to the television program Fantástico in 2006, due to the success of her character Milu, in the telenovela Cobras & Lagartos, Pêra spoke about her career, revealing that she could not stand working with actors with bad breath and foot odor. She commented that there are many actors who do not care about hygiene, without mentioning names (a hint towards his romantic partner in the telenovela, Herson Capri). Pêra stated that she never thought she was beautiful and that she was always clumsy.

In 2008, she starred in the film Polaroides Urbanas, by Miguel Falabella, in which he played twin sisters.

In 2009, she was cast by TV Globo to play hippie Rejane Batista in the miniseries Cinquentinha, by Aguinaldo Silva. After several scenes were recorded, the actress gave up the role, causing discomfort among the network's management. Betty Lago took over the role from Pêra. Some news that circulated at the time stated that the reason for not wanting to continue with the interpretation was that he did not feel comfortable with the role.

In 2010, she was part of the cast of the series A Vida Alheia, by Miguel Falabella, on Rede Globo, as Catarina.

In January 2013, the series Pé na Cova premiered, in which Pêra played Darlene, a makeup artist at her ex-husband Ruço's (Miguel Falabella) funeral home, who lives in the suburbs. In April 2014, due to personal problems, the actress left the series, returning to recording on 11 June 2014.

At the 2015 carnival, Pêra was honored by the samba school Mocidade Alegre, in São Paulo. In August of the same year, she was honored at the Gramado Film Festival, where she received the Oscarito Trophy.

Her life and career are depicted in the 2024 documentary film Viva Marília, by Zelito Viana, Esperança Motta and Nelson Motta.

== Personal life ==
Pêra married for the first time at the age of seventeen the musician Paulo Graça Mello. They were married from 1960 to 1962. She was 18 when she gave birth to their son, Ricardo Graça Mello who became an actor. Paulo Graça Mello died in a car accident in 1969. Her second marriage was to comedian Agildo Ribeiro, from whom she separated in 1968. The following year she married actor Paulo Villaça, her partner in Fala Baixo Senão Eu Grito, separating in 1971. In 1972, she married with Nelson Motta, separating in 1980. From this marriage, her daughters, Esperança Motta and Nina were born. Her last marriage, from 1998 until her death in 2015, was to Rio de Janeiro economist Bruno Faria. She was the older sister of Sandra Pêra, granddaughter of Antônia Marzullo, also actresses, and niece of actor Abel Pêra.

== Death ==
Pêra died on 5 December 2015 in her apartment in the Ipanema neighborhood of Rio de Janeiro. In the last months of her life, she was fighting lung cancer. She had spent the year undergoing medical treatment, combating wear and tear on her hip bones, which prevented her from acting. She was buried in the São João Batista Cemetery, in the city of Rio de Janeiro.

== Filmography ==
=== Television ===
Year	Title	Role	Nota
1965	Rosinha do Sobrado	Rosinha	
1965	A Moreninha	Carolina	
1965	Padre Tião	Maria Aparecida "Cidinha"	
1965	Um Rosto de Mulher	Elizabeth	
1968	Beto Rockfeller	Manuela	
1969	Super Plá	Joana Martini	
1971	Bandeira 2	Noeli	
1971	O Cafona	Shirley Sexy	
1972	Comédia Especial	Ana Carolina	Episode: "Amor à Brasileira"
1972	Comédia Especial	Catarina Batista	Episode: "A Megera Domada"
1972	Uma Rosa com Amor	Serafina Rosa Petrone	
1972	Viva Marília	Various characters	
1974	Supermanoela	Manoela	
1979	Malu Mulher	Clarisse	Episode: "Em Legítima Defesa da Honra e Outras Loucuras"
1982	Quem Ama Não Mata	Alice	
1983-1986	Programa de Domingo	Various skits	
1987	Brega & Chique	Rafaela Alvaray	
1988	O Primo Basílio	Juliana Couceiro Tavira	
1989	Top Model	Suzana Pasolini	Episode: "September 18th"
1990	Rainha da Sucata	Herself	Episodes: "April 2–3"
1990	Lua Cheia de Amor	Genuína Miranda "Genu"	
1994	Incidente em Antares	Erotildes da Conceição	
1996	O Campeão	Elizabeth Caldeira	
1997	Mandacaru	Isadora	
1998	Meu Bem Querer	Custódia Alves Serrão	
1999	Zorra Total	Queen Elizabeth	Season 1
2000	Garotas do Programa	Various characters	
2001	Brava Gente	Pola	Episode: "Ana Neri"
2001	Os Maias	Maria Monforte	
2003	Celebridade	Herself	Episode: "December 16th"
2004	Começar de Novo	Janis / Marlene Emilinha / Vó Doidona	
2006	JK	Sarah Lemos Kubitschek	
2006	Cobras & Lagartos	Maria Luísa Pasquim Montini "Milú"	
2007	Toma Lá, Dá Cá	Madame Ivone / Comadre Madellon	Episode:"Boi Sonso, Marrada Certa"
2007	Duas Caras	Gioconda de Queiroz Barreto	
2008	Casos e Acasos	Sônia	Episode: "A Vaga, a Entrevista e o Cachorro-Quente"
2008	Xuxa e as Noviças	Sister Gardênia	End of year special
2010	A Vida Alheia	Catarina Faissol	
2010	Ti Ti Ti	Rafaela Alvaray	Episode: "March 18"
2011	Insensato Coração	Herself	Episode: "January 17th"
2011	Zorra Total	Herself	Episode: "May 7th"
2011	Aquele Beijo	Maruschka Lemos de Sá	
2012	Louco por Elas	Madame Vivi	Episode: " - Léo Dá Jantar Para Provar Que Não É Ciumento"
2013–2016	Pé na Cova	Darlene Pereira dos Santos (Note: Although the actress died in 2015, she had already recorded a final season of the program, which was shown until the year after her death.)	

=== Film ===
Source: Mulheres do Cinema Brasileiro - Marília Pêra

Year	Title	Role	Notes
1968	O Homem que Comprou o Mundo	Rosinha	
1970	É Simonal	Drunk Woman	
1971	O Donzelo	The Virgin	
1975	Ana, a Libertina	Ana	
1975	O Rei da Noite	Pupe	
1978	O Grande Desbum	Madalena	
1980	Pixote, a Lei do Mais Fraco	Sueli	
1982	Bar Esperança	Ana Moreno	
1984	Areias Sagradas (Parábola em Ipanema)	Paulinho's hand	Short film
1984	Mixed Blood	Rita La Punta	
1986	Night Angels	Marta Brum	
1989	Better Days Ahead	Maryalva Matos "Mary"	
1995	Jenipapo	Renata	
1996	Tieta do Agreste	Perpétua	
1997	Happy Hours	Psychologist	
1998	Central Station	Irene	
1999	Traveller	Ana Lara	
2000	Amélia	Amélia	
2003	Que sera, sera	Fernanda	
2005	Garrincha, a Estrela Solitária	Vanderléia	
2005	Living the Dream	Vanessa	
2005	Vestido de noiva	Madame Clessy	
2006	Acredite, um Espírito Baixou em Mim	Graça	
2006	Pixote in Memoriam	Herself	Documentary
2007	Playing	Sarita	
2008	Nossa vida não cabe num opala	Srª. Castilho	
2008	Polaróides Urbanas	Magda / Magali	
2009	Embarque Imediato	Justina / Gilda	
2013	Histórias Íntimas	Herself	Documentary
2016	Tô Ryca	Madame Claude	Posthumous release

== Stage ==
- 1948 - Medéia
- 1948 - Frenesi
- 1948 - O casaco encantado
- 1957–59 - Grande Teatro Tupi / Teatro da Imperatriz da Seda
- 1957–59 - Espetáculos Tonelux / Teatrinho Trol
- 1957–59 - Ballet às Segundas / Câmera Um
- 1959–60 - O filé vem de fora
- 1960 - Circo Thiany
- 1960 - Boite Plaza Show Todas elas são barbadas (Cole)
- 1960 - Terra seca
- 1960 - O rei mentiroso
- 1960–61 - My fair Lady
- 1961 - Espanta gato
- 1960 - Divorciados
- 1960 - Society em baby doll
- 1961 - Minha querida lady
- 1963 - O teu cabelo não nega
- 1964 - The Threepenny Opera
- 1964 - Como vencer na vida sem fazer força
- 1966 - Se correr o bicho pega, se ficar o bicho come
- 1966 - Onde canta o sabiá
- 1967 - The Taming of the Shrew
- 1967 - A úlcera de ouro
- 1968 - O barbeiro de Sevilha
- 1968 - Roda viva
- 1969 - A moreninha
- 1970 - A vida escrachada de Joana Martini e Baby Stompanato
- 1971 - A pequena notável
- 1973 - Apareceu a Margarida
- 1974 - Pippin
- 1975 - A feiticeira
- 1975 - Síndica, qual é a tua?
- 1976 - Deus lhe pague
- 1977 - O exércício
- 1978 - A menina e o vento (acting and direction)
- 1979 - Pato com laranja
- 1980 - Brasil, da censura à abertura
- 1981 - Doce deleite
- 1983 - Adorável Júlia
- 1984 - Brincando em cima daquilo
- 1986 - The Mystery of Irma Vep (direction)
- 1987 - A estrela Dalva
- 1989 - Elas por ela
- 1991 - Quem matou a baronesa?
- 1992 - Elas por ela
- 1992 - A prima dona
- 1996 - Master Class
- 1997 - Padre Antonio Vieira
- 1998 - Toda nudez será castigada
- 1998 - Ciranda dos homens, carnaval dos animais
- 1999 - Além da linha d'água
- 1999 - Altar do incenso
- 2000 - O amigo oculto (direction)
- 2001 - Estrela tropical
- 2001 - Vitor ou Vitória
- 2002 - A filha da...
- 2003 - Marília Pêra canta Ari Barroso
- 2004 - Mademoiselle Chanel
- 2005 - Marília Pêra canta Carmen Miranda
- 2006 - Pasárgada!
- 2006 - W In Tour 2006 - Era Uma Vez... (direction)
- 2007 - Um lobo nada mau (direction)
- 2008 - Doce Deleite (direction)
- 2009 - Gloriosa
- 2012 - Herivelto como Conheci
- 2013 - Alô, Dolly!

== Discography ==
Year	Title	Type	Label
1975	Feiticeira	LP	Som Livre
1985	A música em Pessoa	LP	Som Livre
1989	Elas por elas	LP	
2000	Estrela tropical	CD	
2001	Euteamo e suas ideias	CD	

== Awards and nominations ==
Year	Award	Category	Work nominated	Result
1969	Prêmio Governador do Estado do Rio de Janeiro	Best Actress	Fala Baixo Senão eu Grito	Won
1969	Troféu APCA	Best Actress	Fala Baixo Senão eu Grito	Won
1969	Prêmio Molière de Teatro	Best Actress	Fala Baixo Senão eu Grito	Won
1972	Troféu Imprensa	Best Actress	O Cafona	Won
1973	Troféu Imprensa	Best Actress	Uma Rosa com Amor	Nominated
1973	Prêmio Molière de Teatro	Best Actress	Apareceu a Margarida	Won
1973	Prêmio Governador do Estado do Rio de Janeir	Best Actress	Apareceu a Margarida	Won
1977	Prêmio Mambembe	Best Actress	O Exercício	Won
1981	New York Film Critics Circle Awards	Best Supporting Actress	Pixote, a Lei do Mais Fraco	Won
1982	National Society of Film Critics Awards	Best Actress	Pixote, a Lei do Mais Fraco	Won
1982	Boston Society of Film Critics Awards	Best Actress	Pixote, a Lei do Mais Fraco	Won
1983	Troféu APCA	Best Television Actress	Quem Ama Não Mata	Won
1983	Prêmio Molière de Teatro	Best Actress	Brincando em Cima Daquilo	Won
1983	Prêmio Mambembe	Best Actress	Adorável Júlia	Won
1983	Festival de Cinema de Gramado	Best Actress	Bar Esperança	Won
1983	Prêmio Air France de Cinema	Best Actress	Bar Esperança	Won
1984	Troféu APCA	Best Film Actress	Bar Esperança	Won
1987	Festival de Cinema de Gramado	Best Actress	Anjos da Noite	Won
1988	Troféu Imprensa	Best Actress	Brega & Chique	Won
1988	Troféu APCA	Best Television Actress	Brega & Chique	Won
1988	Comenda da Ordem do Rio Branco	Official Grau	—N/a	Won
1989	National Society of Film Critics Awards	Honorable Mention Best Actress of the Decade	Career	Won
1991	Troféu APCA	Best Film Actress	Dias Melhores Virão	Won
1991	Festival Internacional de Cinema de Cartagena	Best Actress	Dias Melhores Virão	Won
1996	Troféu APCA	Best Theater Actress	Master Class	Won
1996	Prêmio Sharp de Teatro	Best Actress	Master Class	Won
1996	Prêmio Guarani de Cinema Brasileiro	Best Supporting Actress	Jenipapo	Won
1996	Havana Film Festival	Best Supporting Actress	Tieta do Agreste	Won
1997	Troféu APCA	Best Supporting Actress	Tieta do Agreste	Won
1997	Prêmio Guarani de Cinema Brasileiro	Best Supporting Actress	Tieta do Agreste	Won
1997	Prêmio Mambembe	Best Actress	Master Class	Won
1999	Prêmio Guarani de Cinema Brasileiro	Best Supporting Actress	Central do Brasil	Nominated
1999	Prêmio Master - Jornal dos Clubes	Best Actress	Meu Bem Querer	Won
2000	Grande Prêmio do Cinema Brasileiro	Best Actress	O Viajante	Nominated
2001	Prêmio Arte Qualidade Brasil - SP	Best Miniseries Actress	Os Maias	Won
2003	Ordem do Mérito Cultural	Classe de Comendador	—N/a	Won
2004	Prêmio Shell de Teatro	Best Actress	Fala Baixo Senão eu Grito	Won
2005	Prêmio Contigo! de TV	Best Supporting Actress	Começar de Novo	Nominated
2005	Prêmio Shell de Teatro	Best Actress	Mademoiselle Chanel	Won
2005	Troféu APCA	Best Theater Actress	Mademoiselle Chanel	Won
2005	Prêmio Arte Qualidade Brasil	Best Theater Actress	Mademoiselle Chanel	Won
2006	Prêmio Eletrobras	Best Actress	Mademoiselle Chanel	Won
2006	Prêmio Faz Diferença	Best Actress	Mademoiselle Chanel	Won
2006	Prêmio Arte Qualidade Brasil	Best Actress	JK	Nominated
2007	Prêmio Contigo! de TV	Best Supporting Actress	Cobras e Lagartos	Nominated
2007	Prêmio Arte Qualidade Brasil	Best Supporting Actress	Cobras e Lagartos	Nominated
2007	Brazilian Film Festival of Miami	Best Actress	Polaróides Urbanas	Won
2008	Prêmio Contigo! de TV	Best Supporting Actress	Duas Caras	Won
2008	Prêmio Tudo de Bom! - jornal "O Dia"	Best Actress	Duas Caras	Won
2008	Prêmio Arte Qualidade Brasil	Best Supporting Actress	Duas Caras	Nominated
2008	Prêmio Arte Qualidade Brasil	Best Film Actress	Polaróides Urbanas	Nominated
2008	Prêmio Contigo! de Cinema Nacional	Best Actress	Polaróides Urbanas	Nominated
2009	Prêmio Guarani de Cinema Brasileiro	Best Actress	Polaróides Urbanas	Nominated
2009	Prêmio Arte Qualidade Brasil	Best Theatrical Musical Actress	A Gloriosa	Won
2010	Prêmio APTR de Teatro	Best Protagonist Actress	A Gloriosa	Nominated
2014	Prêmio Quem de Televisão	Best Actress	Pé na Cova	Nominated
