= Djavan =

Brazilian singer-songwriter

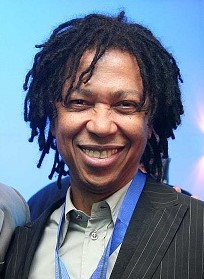
- Djavan in 2009

Background information
- Born: Djavan Caetano Viana; 27 January 1949 (age 77); Maceió, Alagoas, Brazil
- Genres: Música popular brasileira Samba; Latin dance Soul; New wave
- Instruments: Vocals (mezzo-tenor); Guitar
- Years active: 1975–present

Djavan Caetano Viana (Brazilian Portuguese: [dʒaˈvɐ̃]; born 27 January 1949) is a Brazilian singer-songwriter and guitarist.

== Early life and career ==
Djavan was born in Maceió, Brazil to a white father of Dutch descent and a black mother.

He later formed the group Luz, Som, Dimensão (LSD – "Light, Sound, Dimension"), playing Beatles' material. In 1973, Djavan moved to Rio de Janeiro and started singing soap opera soundtracks. His first album, A Voz, o Violão e a Arte de Djavan, was recorded in 1976 and included the hit song "Flor de Lis". Stevie Wonder was a guest on the album Luz.

In 1999, his album Ao Vivo sold 1.2 million copies. In 2016, he was nominated for the 2016 Latin Grammy Awards in the Record of the Year, Album of the Year, Best Portuguese Language Song and Best Singer-Songwriter Album categories. Djavan's compositions have been recorded by numerous musicians, including Al Jarreau, Carmen McRae and The Manhattan Transfer. His album Vesúvio was ranked as the 35th best Brazilian album of 2018 by the Brazilian edition of Rolling Stone magazine.

His life and career are depicted in the 2025 biographical musical Djavan - O Musical: Vidas Pra Contar.

== Discography ==
=== Studio albums ===
- (1976) A Voz, o Violão, a Música de Djavan
- (1978) Djavan
- (1980) Alumbramento
- (1981) Seduzir
- (1982) Luz
- (1984) Lilás
- (1986) Meu Lado
- (1987) Não É Azul Mas É Mar
- (1988) Bird of Paradise
- (1989) Puzzle of Hearts
- (1992) Coisa de Acender
- (1994) Esquinas
- (1995) Novena
- (1996) Malásia
- (1998) Bicho Solto O XIII
- (2001) Milagreiro
- (2004) Vaidade
- (2005) Na Pista, Etc.
- (2007) Matizes
- (2010) Ária
- (2012) Rua dos Amores
- (2015) Vidas pra Contar
- (2018) Vesúvio
- (2022) D
- (2024) Origem

=== Live albums ===
- (1999) Ao Vivo
- (2011) Ária (Ao Vivo)
- (2014) Rua dos Amores (Ao Vivo)
- (2024) D (Ao Vivo em Maceió)

=== Video albums ===
- (2000) Ao Vivo
- (2002) Milagreiro (Ao Vivo)
- (2011) Ária (Ao Vivo)
- (2014) Rua dos Amores (Ao Vivo)
- (2024) D (Ao Vivo em Maceió)
