= Amleto Daissé =

Italian cinematographer (1906–1964)

- Born: 1906; Italy
- Died: 1964 (aged 57–58); Brazil
- Occupation: Cinematographer
- Years active: 1942-1964

Amleto Daissé (1906–1964) was an Italian cinematographer who worked for most of his career in Brazil.

== Selected filmography ==
- Don Cesare di Bazan (1942)
- Angelina (1947)
- Iracema (1949)
- The Terrible Twosome (1953)
- Assalto ao Trem Pagador (1962)

== Bibliography ==
- Ramos, Fernão & Miranda, Luiz Felipe. Enciclopédia do cinema brasileiro. Senac, 2000.
