= Matizes =

Studio album by Djavan
- Released: 2007
- Label: Luanda

Djavan chronology
Malásia (1996)	Matizes (2007)

Matizes (in English Hues) is an album of singer and songwriter Brazilian Djavan, released in 2007.

== Track listing ==
1. Joaninha (Djavan) – 5:35
2. Azedo e Amargo (Djavan) – 4:41
3. Mea-Culpa (Djavan) – 4:04
4. Imposto (Djavan) – 4:16
5. Delírio dos Mortais (Djavan) – 3:50
6. Louça-Fina (Djavan) – 5:12
7. Matizes (Djavan) – 4:59
8. Por Uma Vida em Paz (Djavan) – 4:44
9. Desandou (Djavan) – 4:35
10. Adorava Me Ver Como Seu (Djavan) – 4:50
11. Pedra (Djavan) – 4:48
12. Fera (Djavan) – 7:38

Total play time – 59 minutes and 12 seconds
