= Manuel Pêra =

- Born: Manuel Maria Soares Pêra; 16 November 1894; Oliveira de Azeméis, Aveiro District, Portugal
- Died: 11 August 1967 (aged 72); Rio de Janeiro, Brazil
- Years active: 1914–1963
- Spouse: Dinorah Marzullo
- Relatives: Abel Pêra (brother); Marília Pêra (daughter); Sandra Pêra (daughter)

Manuel Maria Soares Pêra (16 November 1894 – 11 August 1967) was a Portuguese actor based in Brazil.

== Biography ==
Manuel was born in Carregosa, Oliveira de Azeméis, Aveiro District, Portugal. He was the father of Brazilian actresses Marília Pêra and Sandra Pêra, fruits of his marriage to the actress Dinorah Marzullo. He was brother of the Portuguese actor Abel Pêra (1891-1975) and Joaquim.

== Filmography ==
=== Cinema ===
Year	Title	Role
1963	Crime no Sacopã	
1963	Cerimônia Macabra	
1962	Vagabundos na Society	Camelot Delegate
1955	Mãos Sangrentas	Head of discipline
1949	Pra Lá de Boa	
1949	Vendaval Maravilhoso	Joaquim Nabuco
1947	Luz dos Meus Olhos	
1944	Romance de um Mordedor	
1940	Pega Ladrão	
1939	Onde Estás Felicidade?	
1939	Está Tudo Aí	Bragança
1937	O Bobo do Rei	Eccentric Millionaire
1937	O Grito da Mocidade	
1917	Entre Dois Amores	
1914	O Crime dos Banhados	
