= In the Family (1971 film) =

1971 film

- Directed by: Paulo Porto
- Written by: Helen Leary; Noah Leary
- Produced by: Paulo Porto
- Starring: Iracema de Alencar
- Cinematography: José Medeiros
- Release date: July 1971
- Running time: 90 minutes
- Country: Brazil
- Language: Portuguese

In the Family (Portuguese: Em Família) is a 1971 Brazilian drama film directed by Paulo Porto. It was entered into the 7th Moscow International Film Festival where it won a Silver Prize.

== Cast ==
- Iracema de Alencar as Dona Lu
- Rodolfo Arena as Seu Souza
- Paulo Porto as Jorge
- Odete Lara as Neli
- Anecy Rocha as Corinha
- Procópio Ferreira as Afonsinho
- Fernanda Montenegro as Anita
- Antero de Oliveira as Roberto
- Elisa Fernandes as Suzana
- Álvaro Aguiar as Arildo
