= O Homem do Sputnik =

1959 film directed by Carlos Manga

- Directed by: Carlos Manga
- Starring: Oscarito; Cyll Farney; Zezé Macedo; Neide Aparecida; Alberto Perez
- Cinematography: Ozen Sermet
- Edited by: Waldemar Noya
- Music by: Radamés Gnattali
- Production company: Atlântida Cinematográfica
- Release date: 1959
- Running time: 98 minutes
- Country: Brazil
- Language: Portuguese

O Homem do Sputnik is a Brazilian comedy film from 1959 about a man (played by Oscarito) who tries to sell a UFO that lands on his house. Spies tail him, as they suspect it is a Russian Sputnik satellite. Norma Bengell also stars, performing a parody of Brigitte Bardot.

== Plot ==
A couple of redneck egg traders, Anastácio and Cleci, are surprised by a bang in their chicken coop. Anastácio finds a metallic globe among his chickens. The next day, Cleci reads in the newspaper about the accident with the Russian satellite Sputnik and recognizes in the photograph an object similar to the one that fell in her backyard. Anastácio takes the globe to the pawnshop and shows it to the employee Dorinha. She calls the newspaper where her boyfriend Nelson works and tells him the fact.

Alberto, an unscrupulous journalist, overhears the conversation between the couple and tells the news to the head of the newspaper. Nelson goes to find Anastácio and asks him to hide the object. Anastácio places him inside the well. The news that Sputnik crashed in Brazil makes the front page of the newspapers. Anastácio and Clecy become celebrities. They stay at the Copacabana Palace, where they receive proposals from groups of Russians, Americans and French who try to seduce Anastácio, introducing him to the French singer Bebe.

The excessive interests of foreigners in the satellite drive the two crazy. Anastácio is kidnapped by the French and Nelson by the Americans. They run away and return to Anastácio's house. Russians, Americans and French follow them, fighting for the valuable trophy, which nobody knows where it is. Anastácio reveals the location where Sputnik is and everyone gets excited. They find nothing in the well. As he passed by, the sexton says he took the Sputnik and turned it into a lightning rod for the church. The foreign agents leave disappointed and Anastácio Cleci returns home, but they come across the real Sputnik that had just fallen into the chicken coop.
