= Iracema de Alencar =

Brazilian actress

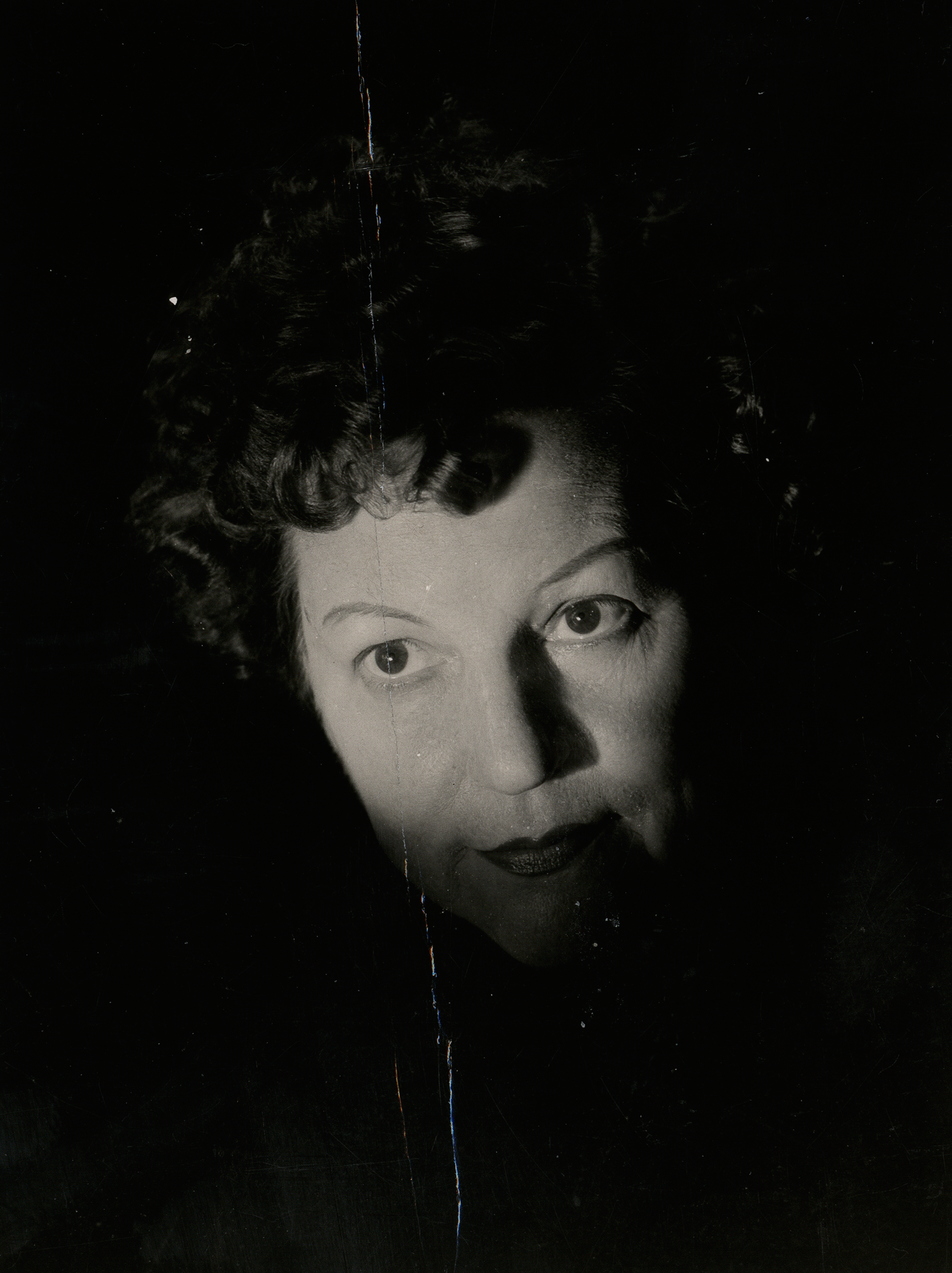
- Alencar in 1964
- Born: 19 April 1900; Triunfo, Rio Grande do Sul, Brazil
- Died: 17 March 1978 (aged 77); Petropolis, Rio de Janeiro, Brazil
- Other name: Ida Hermínia Kerber
- Occupation: Actress
- Years active: 1917–1973 (film)

Iracema de Alencar (19 April 1900 – 17 March 1978) was a Brazilian actress. She made her debut as the lead in the 1917 silent film Iracema. After working in theatre for many years she appeared in several other films, much later in her career. She was a beloved actor, and inspired many throughout her entire profession.

== Filmography ==
=== Film ===
Year	Title	Role
1973	O Pica-pau Amarelo	Dona Benta
1972	Salve-se Quem Puder - Rally da Juventude	Amália
1972	Som, Amor e Curtição	Zezé's grandmother
1972	O Supercareta	Honorina
1971	Rua Descalça	Lady
1970	In the Family	Dona Lu
1969	Brasil Ano 2000	Mãe
1967	The Girl from Ipanema	Dona Eudóxia
1959	Garota Enxuta	Grandmother
1954	Toda A Vida em Quinze Minutos	Passenger
1921	Amor é Amor	Miss
1917	Iracema	Iracema

=== Television ===
Year	Title	Role	Notes	Broadcast
1978	Caso Especial	Dona Anita	Episode: "Feliz Aniversário"	TV Globo
1969	O Retrato de Laura	Aunt Letícia		TV Tupi
1969	Enquanto Houver Estrelas	Alcina		TV Tupi
1965	Padre Tião	Grandmother Santana		TV Globo
1965	A Moreninha	Dona Ana		TV Globo
1965	Rosinha do Sobrado	Jerusa		TV Globo
1965	Rua da Matriz	—N/a		TV Globo
1957	Grande Teatro Tupi	Various characters		TV Tupi

== Stage career ==
- Inspetor, Venha Correndo (1969)
- Rasto Atrás (1966)
- A Perda Irreparável (1965)
- Oito Mulheres (1963)
- Don João Tenório (1960)
- Diálogo das Carmelitas (1955)
- A Doutora Magda (1937)
- Quem Ri Afinal? (1931)
- A Vida É Assim (1931)
- A Estrada dos Deuses (1931)
- Felicidade (1930)
- O Homem de Fraque Preto (1930)

== Bibliography ==
- Pick, Zuzana M. The New Latin American Cinema: A Continental Project. University of Texas Press, 2010.
