= Watson Macedo =

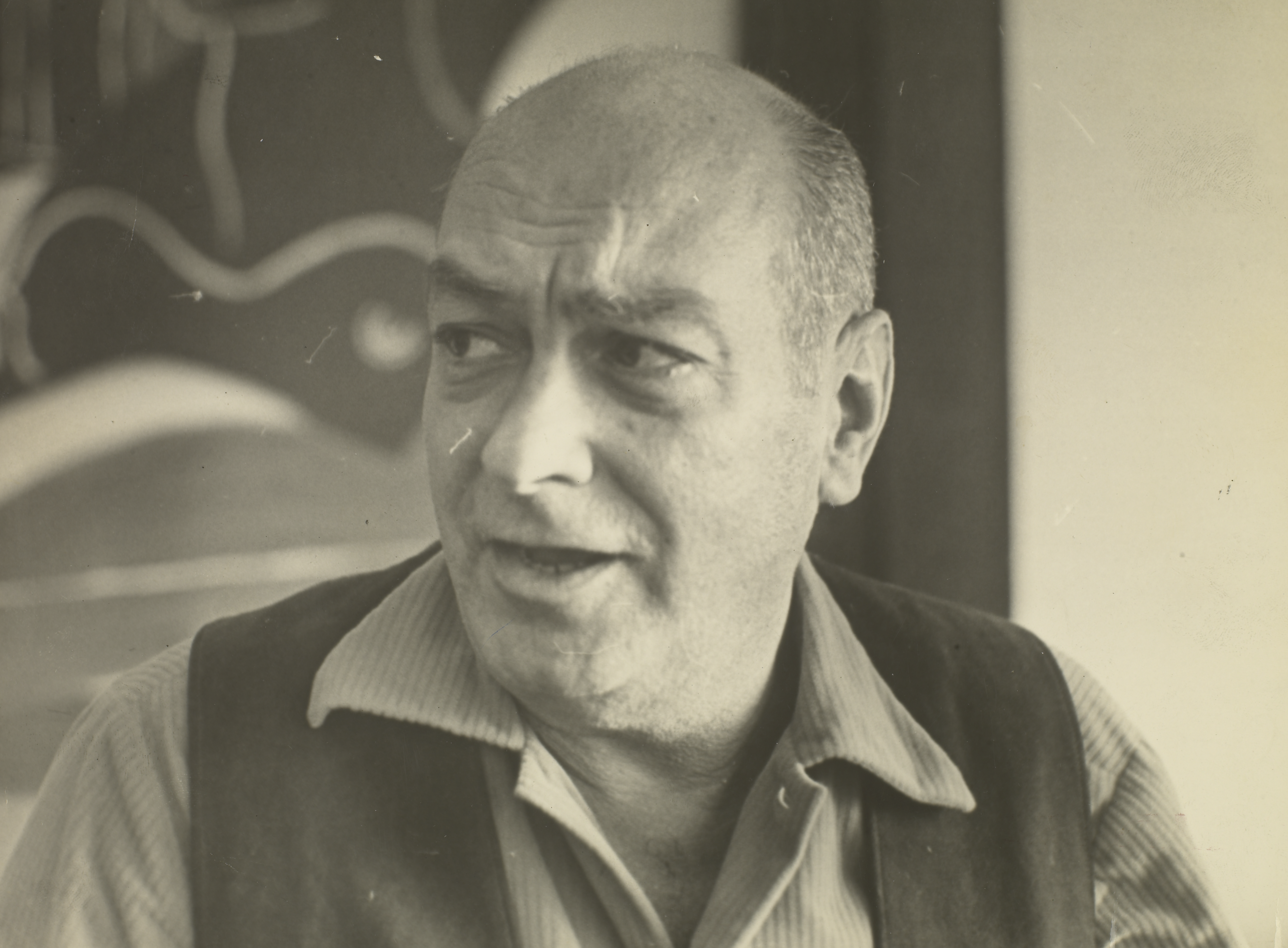
- Born: July 21, 1919; Rio de Janeiro, Brazil
- Died: April 8, 1981 (aged 61); Rio de Janeiro, Brazil
- Occupations: Film director, film producer, film editor, screenwriter

Watson Macedo (July 21, 1919 – April 8, 1981) was a Brazilian screenwriter, film editor, producer and director.

== Biography ==
Watson Macedo was born in the city of Itaocara in 1918 or 1919. He began his career in 1938 as a set designer and assistant director for the actress and filmmaker Carmem Santos on the film Inconfidência Mineira.

His directorial debut came in 1941 with the medium-length film Barulho na Universidade. Shortly thereafter, he moved to the Atlântida studios, where he worked as an editor and assistant director. His debut as a feature director was the 1945 comedy Não Adianta Chorar, where he began to display the stylistic elements that would later define his work in musical chanchadas. Macedo was responsible for establishing actors Grande Otelo, Oscarito, Cyll Farney, Eliana Macedo (his niece), and José Lewgoy as the leading names of the musical comedies of the 1950s.

== Selected filmography ==
=== Editor ===
- Minas Conspiracy (1948)

=== Director ===
- There Is No Point in Crying (1945)
- …And the World Laughs (1948)
- Carnival in the Fire (1946)
- Warning to Sailors (1951)
- Samba in Brasília (1960)
- Rio, Verão & Amor (1966)

== Bibliography ==
- Hernandez-Rodriguez, R. Splendors of Latin Cinema. ABC-CLIO, 2009.
