= Turíbio Ruiz =

- Born: September 26, 1929; Poá, São Paulo state, Brazil
- Died: July 25, 2020 (aged 90); São Paulo, Brazil
- Occupations: Actor; presenter
- Years active: Late 1940s–2010
- Spouse: Lídia Costa
- Children: 3

"Dorinha no Soçaite: Elenco". AdoroCinema.

Turíbio Ruiz (September 26, 1929 – July 25, 2020) was a Brazilian actor, television presenter, and radio presenter. His career as an actor and broadcaster spanned from the late 1940s to the early 2010s.

== Biography ==
Ruiz was born in Poá, São Paulo state. His father, Ramon Ruiz Lopes, had settled in Poá after immigrating to Brazil from Spain. Turíbio Ruiz's siblings included Ramon Ruiz Lopes Filho, a journalist.

Ruiz's career began as an announcer and broadcaster for Rádio Marabá in the late 1940s. He also worked as a radio and television broadcaster based in Mogi das Cruzes, São Paulo state. Additionally, he appeared as a voice actor in Brazilian films and television series.

Ruiz provided the Brazilian Portuguese voice performances for many foreign-language films, notably the roles of John the Baptist (Andre Gregory) in Martin Scorsese's The Last Temptation of Christ (1988) and Cole Carlin (Anthony James) in the 1974 film, High Plains Drifter, starring Clint Eastwood.

Ruiz's last credit was the Rede Globo telenovela in 2010. He portrayed Ruriá Karuê, an Indigenous Brazilian character, opposite Cléo Pires and Juca de Oliveira in the series.

Turíbio Ruiz died from a stroke in the city of São Paulo on July 25, 2020, at the age of 90. He was buried in the Municipal Cemetery of Poá, the city where he was born in 1929.

Ruiz had been married twice, including to the late actress Lídia Costa, who died in 2004. He had three children.

== Filmography ==
=== Television ===
Year	Title	Character	Notes
1955	Miguel Strogof		
1955	Kim	Llama	
1957	Os Três Mosqueteiros	Richelieu	
1957	Pequeno Mundo de D. Camilo	Bilo	
1957	O Corcunda de Notre Dame	Archdeacon	
1958	Os Miseráveis		
1964	Ambição	Otávio	
1965	A Sombra do Passado	Lúcio	
1965	Marina	João	
1966	Redenção	Alexandre	
1968	O Santo Mestiço	Tenório	
1969	A Grande Mentira	Heitor	
1969	A Cabana do Pai Tomás	Mr. Shelby	
1979	Plantão de Polícia	—N/a	(Episode:Ligação Direta)
1980	Um Homem Muito Especial	Jonathan	
1981-1983	Alegria 81	Vários Personagens	
1984	Corpo a Corpo	Machado	
1988	O Primo Basílio	—N/a	
1988	Vale Tudo	Dr. Gomes	
1989	Vida Nova	Padre Antônio	
1996	Sai de Baixo	Tio Lico	
1999	Ô... Coitado!	Ubiratan	
2002	Marisol	Basílio	
2004	Meu Cunhado	Padre Pio	
2007	O Profeta	Padre	
2007	A Diarista	Afonso	
2008	Desejo Proibido	Arcebispo Dom Duarte	
2009	Caminho das Índias	Bába	
2010	Araguaia	Ruriá	

=== Films ===
Year	Title	Character
1956	O Sobrado	Rodrigo Cambará
1957	Dorinha no Soçaite	Pai de Dorinha
1958	O Grande Momento	Fotógrafo
1958	Chão Bruto	—N/a
1966	Riacho de Sangue	Divino
1969	Marcado Para o Perigo	—N/a
1969	Corisco, o Diabo Loiro	
1975	Cada um Dá o que Tem	Mateus
1977	Tiradentes, o Mártir da Independência	
1977	Mágoa de Boiadeiro	Velho
1977	As Trapalhadas de Dom Quixote	Dom Quixote
1977	Presídio de Mulheres Violentadas	Diretor do Presídio
1980	Na Estrada da Vida	Pedro
1980	O Jeca e a Égua Milagrosa	Coronel Libório
1983	O Escândalo na Sociedade	—N/a
1986	A Hora do Medo	—N/a
1984	Padre Pedro e a Revolta das Crianças	Prefeito Ênio Rodrigues
2001	Urbania	Seu Edmundo
