= Sandra Pêra =

Brazilian actress, singer and theater director

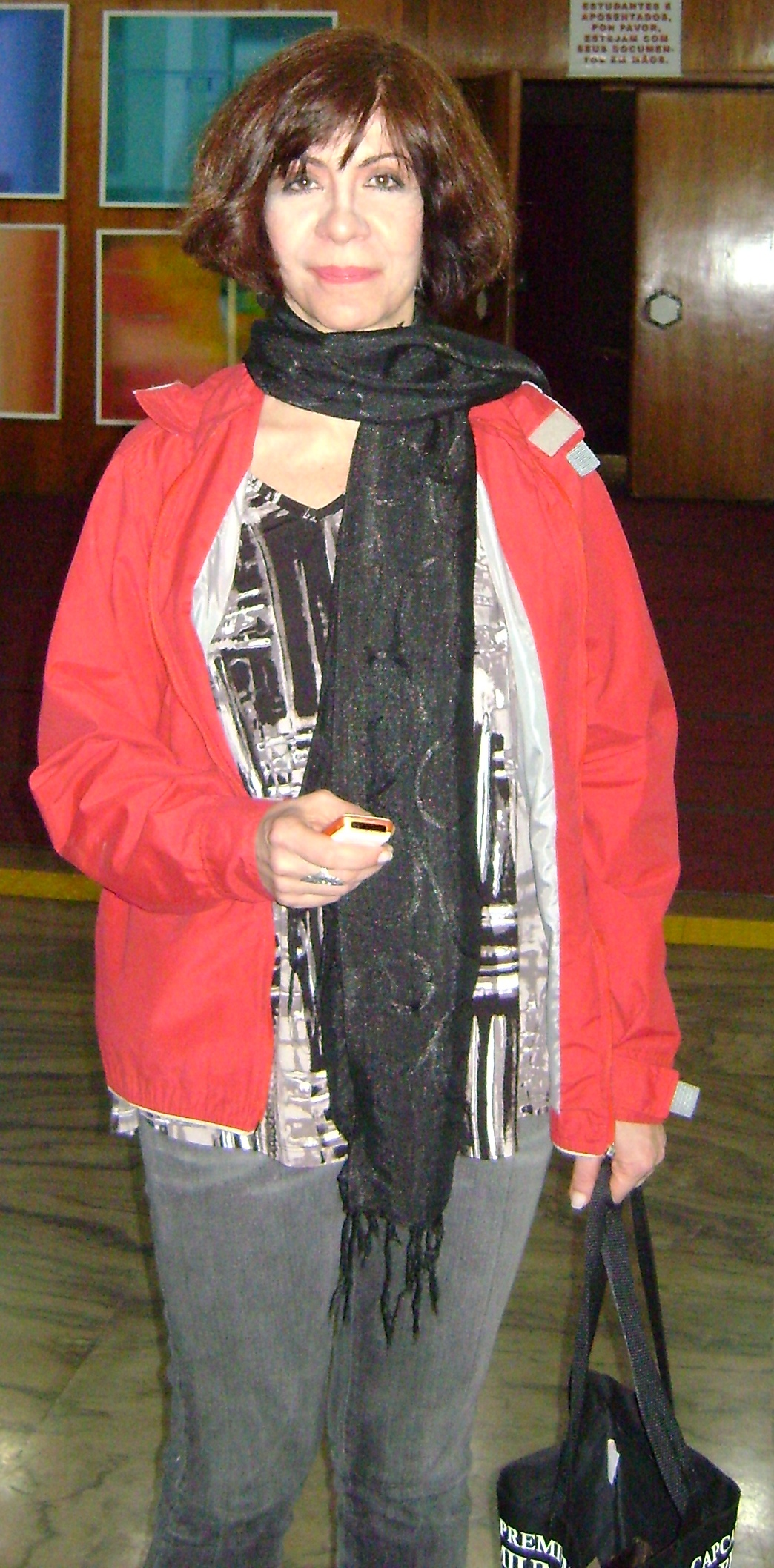
- Born: Sandra Cristina Marzullo Pêra; September 17, 1954 (age 71); Rio de Janeiro, Brazil
- Occupations: Actress, theater director and singer
- Relatives: Manuel Pêra (father), Dinorah Marzullo (mother) Antonia Marzullo (grandmother), Marília Pêra (sister), Amora Pêra (daughter)

Sandra Cristina Marzullo Pêra (born September 17, 1954) is a Brazilian actress, singer and theater director.

== Family ==
She is daughter of the actors Manuel Pêra and Dinorah Marzullo and granddaughter of the actress Antonia Marzullo. She is mother of the singer Amora Pêra, who is daughter of the composer and singer Gonzaguinha. Sandra is sister of the actress Marília Pêra.

== Career ==
She started the career in 1975 in the nightclub Dancin' Days, when Nelson Motta formed a group of waitresses-singers, that afterwards would turn to be called As Frenéticas.

She directed the show Baiana da Gema, of the singer Simone.

== Television ==
- 2013 Chiquititas .... Valentina

- 2011 Show do Tom .... Bruna Cachacinha's mother
- 2010 Passione .... Madame Kiti
- 2008 Chamas da Vida .... Mercedes
- 2008 Malhação .... Mafalda
- 2008 Sete Pecados .... wardress
- 2002 Desejos de Mulher .... Geralda
- 2001 Porto dos Milagres .... reporter
- 1997 Mandacaru .... baiana
- 1996 O Campeão
- 1992 Escolinha do Professor Raimundo .... Dinorá (the gossiper)
- 1978 Dancin' Days .... herself
- 1972 Uma Rosa com Amor.... Sílvia

== Cinema ==
Cinema credits:

- 2008 Embarque Imediato .... Betina
- 1989 Dias Melhores Virão .... Tânia
- 1987 Agonia
- 1978 O Bom Marido
