= Luz (Djavan album) =

1982 studio album by Djavan

Studio album by Djavan
- Released: 20 August 1982
- Length: 41:41
- Label: CBS Discos/Sony Music
- Producers: Ronnie Foster, Djavan

Djavan chronology
Seduzir (1981)	Luz (1982)	Lilás (1984)

Luz ("Light" in English) is the fifth studio album by Brazilian singer and songwriter Djavan, released on 20 August 1982, by CBS Records. Stevie Wonder is featured on the song "Samurai".

== Background ==
In the early 1980s, American record producer Quincy Jones bought the publishing rights to some of Djavan's music, among other Brazilian musicians.

In 1982, Djavan was invited to the United States by CBS Records (now Sony Music) to record an album for an American audience. There, he was introduced to producer Ronnie Foster and musician Stevie Wonder, the latter of whom recorded "Samurai" with him in Los Angeles. Although the album did not sell exceptionally well in the U.S., it had sold 500,000 copies in Brazil by the fall of 1984.

== Critical reception ==
Professional ratings
Review scores
Source	Rating
AllMusic	4/5 stars

Alvaro Neder, writing for AllMusic, gave the album four out of five stars.

== Track listing ==
Track order sourced from Spotify and Djavan's official website.

Luz track listing
No.	Title	Length
1.	"Samurai" (featuring Stevie Wonder)	4:48
2.	"Luz"	4:08
3.	"Nobreza"	2:28
4.	"Capim"	4:17
5.	"Sina"	5:43
6.	"Pétala"	4:43
7.	"Banho de Rio"	4:36
8.	"Açaí"	4:38
9.	"Esfinge"	4:20
10.	"Minha Irmã"	2:08
Total length:		41:41

== Certifications ==
Certifications for "Luz"
Region	Certification	Certified units/sales
Brazil (Pro-Música Brasil)	3× Platinum	750,000^{‡}
^{‡} Sales+streaming figures based on certification alone.
