= Iracema (1917 film) =

1917 film directed by Vittorio Capellaro

- Directed by: Vittorio Capellaro
- Written by: Vittorio Capellaro
- Based on: Iracema by José de Alencar
- Produced by: Vittorio Capellaro
- Starring: Iracema de Alencar; Vittorio Capellaro
- Cinematography: Paulo Benedetti
- Production company: Capellaro Filmes
- Release date: 1917
- Country: Brazil
- Languages: Silent; Portuguese intertitles

Iracema is a 1917 Brazilian silent historical film directed by Vittorio Capellaro and starring Iracema de Alencar in the title role. The film is an adaptation of José de Alencar's 1865 novel of the same title. The story is set during the early contacts between European and Native Americans in what became Brazil. It was remade in 1949.

== Cast ==
- Iracema de Alencar as Iracema
- Vittorio Capellaro
- Georgina N. Cappelaro
- Ernesto Crehneras
- Alvaro Fonseca
- Leonel Simi

== Bibliography ==
- Johnson, Randal & Stam, Robert. Brazilian Cinema. Columbia University Press, 1995,
