= The Terrible Twosome =

1953 film directed by Carlos Manga

- Directed by: Carlos Manga
- Written by: Victor Lima; Carlos Manga; Guido Martinelli
- Produced by: Victor Lima
- Cinematography: Amleto Daissé
- Edited by: Carlos Manga; Wilson Monteiro; Waldemar Noya
- Music by: Lyrio Panicalli
- Production company: Atlântida Cinematográfica
- Distributed by: UCB
- Release date: 13 August 1953
- Running time: 90 minutes
- Country: Brazil
- Language: Portuguese

The Terrible Twosome (Portuguese: A Dupla do Barulho) is a 1953 Brazilian comedy film directed by Carlos Manga and starring Oscarito, Grande Otelo and Edith Morel.

== Cast ==
- Oscarito as Tinoco
- Grande Otelo as Tião
- Edith Morel
- Mara Abrantes
- Renato Restier
- Wilson Grey
- Fregolente
- Gregorio Barrios
- Hélio Celano
- Paulo Correa
- Paulo Croccia as Ronaldo
- Clóvis de Castro
- Átila Iório
- Roberto Leandro
- Madame Lou as Madame Chouchou
- Nelson Morrisson
- Blanche Mur
- Ana Maria Neumann
- Ilma Pereira
- João Péricles
- Adriano Reys as Reporter
- Frederico Schlee as Van Der Fleet
- Aloisio Viana
- Anthony Zamborsky as Coronel Mata Gatos

== Bibliography ==
- Shaw, Lisa & Dennison, Stephanie. Brazilian National Cinema. Routledge, 2014.
