= Que sera, sera (film) =

2002 film

- Theatrical release poster
- Directed by: Murilo Salles
- Written by: Murilo Salles
- Produced by: Murilo Salles; Valdir Barros; Roberto Bellezia; Simone Ruotolo
- Starring: Marília Pêra; Rocco Pitanga
- Cinematography: Gustavo Hadba
- Edited by: Pedro Amorim
- Production companies: Cinema Brasil Digital; Estúdios Mega; Mega Color; Cinecolor do Brasil; Quanta
- Release dates: June 2002 (Moscow); 6 October 2002 (Brazil)
- Running time: 90 minutes
- Country: Brazil
- Language: Portuguese

Que sera, sera (Portuguese: Seja o que Deus Quiser!) is a 2002 Brazilian comedy film directed by Murilo Salles. It was entered into the 25th Moscow International Film Festival.

== Cast ==
- Marília Pêra as Dona Fernanda
- Rocco Pitanga as MC PQD
- Ludmila Rosa as Cacá
- Caio Junqueira as Nando
- Débora Lamm as Ruth
- Nicete Bruno as Velha maluca
- Marcelo Serrado as Zé Henrique
