= Paquito =

Paquito is a given name, may refer to:

- Paquito Cordero (1932–2009), Puerto Rican comedian
- Paquito Diaz, (1937–2011), veteran Filipino actor and movie director
- Paquito D'Rivera (born 1948), Cuban clarinetist and saxophonist
- Paquito Ochoa, Jr. (born 1960), Philippine Executive Secretary under the Administration of President Benigno Aquino III
- Anderson Luiz Pinheiro (born 1981), Brazilian footballer
- Juliano Pescarolo Martins (born 1974), Brazilian footballer
- Francisco García Gómez (born 1938), Spanish international footballer and coach
