= Alumbramento =

Studio album by Djavan
- Released: 1980
- Genre: MPB, samba
- Label: EMI Brazil
- Producer: Mariozinho Rocha

Alumbramento is the third album by Brazilian singer and composer Djavan. The album features some of his greatest hits, like "Meu Bem Querer", "Lambada de Serpente" e "Tem Boi Na Linha". The album begins a career of Djavan partnerships with other composers, the following partnerships rarely work in the following.

== Reception ==
Professional ratings
Review scores
Source	Rating
Allmusic	4/5 stars
Notas Musicais	4.5/5 stars

Alvaro Neder in his review for AllMusic gave the album 4 out of 5 stars, calling it "excellent".

== Track listing ==
Side one

No.	Title	Writer(s)	Length
1.	"Tem Boi Na Linha"	Djavan, Aldir Blanc, Paulo Emílio	2:39
2.	"Sim ou Não"	Djavan	3:16
3.	"Lambada de Serpente"	Djavan, Cacaso	3:27
4.	"A Rosa" (with Chico Buarque)	Chico Buarque	4:24
5.	"Dor e Prata"	Djavan	2:54

Side two

No.	Title	Writer(s)	Length
6.	"Meu Bem Querer"	Djavan	3:26
7.	"Aquele Um"	Djavan, Aldir Blanc	3:07
8.	"Alumbramento"	Djavan, Chico Buarque	3:32
9.	"Trite Baía de Guanabara"	Novelli, Cacaso	2:59
10.	"Sururu do Capote"	Djavan	2:54
