= Paulo Porto =

Brazilian actor

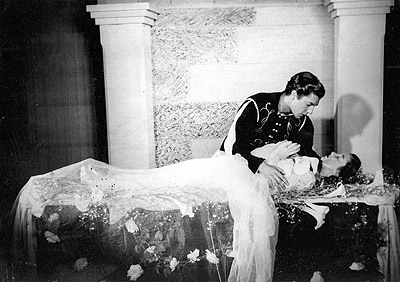
- Porto in 1938
- Born: 1 September 1917; Minas Gerais, Brazil
- Died: 3 July 1999 (aged 81); Rio de Janeiro, Brazil
- Occupations: Actor, film producer, film director
- Years active: 1947-1988

Paulo Porto (1 September 1917 – 3 July 1999) was a Brazilian actor, film producer, director and screenwriter. He appeared in 32 films and television shows between 1947 and 1988. He starred in the 1973 film All Nudity Shall Be Punished, which won the Silver Bear at the 23rd Berlin International Film Festival. His 1971 film In the Family was entered into the 7th Moscow International Film Festival where it won a Silver Prize.

== Filmography ==
=== Film ===
| Year | Title | Role | Notes |
|---|---|---|---|
| 1947 | Asas do Brasil | —N/a | |
| 1948 | Minas Conspiracy | Priest Inácio Nogueira | |
| 1949 | O Dominó Negro | Photographer | |
| 1949 | O Homem que Passa | Conrado | |
| 1951 | Milagre de Amor | Renato | |
| 1965 | Um Ramo para Luísa | Paulo | Also producer and screenwriter |
| 1968 | Fome de amor | Alfredo | Also producer |
| 1968 | Roberto Carlos e o Diamante Cor-de-Rosa | Doctor | |
| 1969 | A Penúltima Donzela | Oswaldo | |
| 1969 | O Bravo Guerreiro | —N/a | |
| 1969 | The Heirs | Medeiros | |
| 1970 | Pra Quem Fica, Tchau | —N/a | Also Producer |
| 1971 | Como Ganhar na Loteria sem Perder a Esportiva | Afrânio | |
| 1971 | In the Family | Jorge | Also producer, director and screenwriter |
| 1973 | As Moças Daquela Hora | —N/a | Producer, director and screenwriter |
| 1973 | Os Primeiros Momentos | Family member | |
| 1973 | Toda Nudez Será Castigada | Herculano | Also producer |
| 1976 | O Casamento | Sabino | |
| 1978 | A Noiva da Cidade | —N/a | |
| 1978 | Fim de Festa | Marcelo | Also producer and director |
| 1979 | As Borboletas Também Amam | Professor Raimundo | Also producer |
| 1979 | O Bom Burguês | Valadares | |
| 1982 | Pra frente, Brasil | —N/a | |
| 1982 | Os Paspalhões em Pinóquio 2000 | Sir | |
| 1984 | Memoirs of Prison | Sobral Pinto | |
| 1986 | Com Licença, Eu Vou à Luta | Juiz | |
| 1987 | Os Fantasmas Trapalhões | Nicolas | |
| 1988 | Dedé Mamata | Grandfather | |

=== Television ===
| Year | Title | Role | Notes |
|---|---|---|---|
| 1953 | Coração Delator | —N/a | |
| 1955 | As Professoras | —N/a | |
| 1957 | Grande Teatro Tupi | —N/a | Episode: " O Sucesso de Mary Dugan" |
| 1957 | O Jovem Dr. Ricardo | —N/a | Episode: "Drama nos Bastidores" |
| 1958 | Primavera | —N/a | |
| 1959 | Trágica Mentira | —N/a | |
| 1965 | A Moreninha | André | |
| 1980 | O Bem-Amado | Tácito Moscoso | Episode: "O Julgamento de Dirceu Borboleta" |
| 1982 | Brilhante | Guilherme | |
| 1988 | Vale Tudo | Queiroz | |
| 1989 | Top Model | Dr. Paulo | |
| 1990 | Desejo | Alfredo Machado Guimarães | |

== Stage ==
- 1938 - Romeu e Julieta
- 1940 - O Avarento
- 1942 - O Engando pelas Aparências
- 1942 - Uma Tragédia Florentina
- 1944 - A Moreninha
- 1949 - Ele, Ela e o Outro
- 1949 - Como os Maridos Enganam
- 1949 - Festa Shakespeariana
- 1949 - Minha Prima Polonesa
- 1949 - Mulher por Um Minuto
- 1949 - Noite Inesquecível
- 1950 - Como os Maridos Enganam
- 1950 - Eu, Heim?
- 1953 - O Sonho de Uma Noite de Luar
- 1956 - O Presépio de Belém
- 1956 - Poeira de Estrelas
- 1957 - Paixão da Terra
- 1960 - Passeio sob o Arco-Íris
- 1963 - A Paixão
- 1966 - Receita de Vinícius
- 1981 - A Volta por Cima
- 1994 - A Alma Quando Sonha É Teatro
