= Abel Pêra =

Portuguese actor

- Born: 16 November 1891; Oliveira de Azeméis, Aveiro District, Portugal
- Died: 27 September 1975 (aged 83); Rio de Janeiro, Brazil
- Occupation: Actor
- Years active: 1914–1975
- Relatives: Manuel Pêra (brother)

Abel Pêra (16 November 1891 – 27 September 1975) was a Portuguese actor based in Brazil. He was brother of the Portuguese actor Manuel Pêra.

== Filmography ==
- Com as Calças na Mão (1975)
- Toda Nudez Será Castigada (1973)
- O Descarte (1973)
- A Filha de Madame Betina (1973)
- Eu Transo, Ela Transa (1972)
- Revólveres Não Cospem Flores (1972)
- As Quatro Chaves Mágicas (1971)
- O Enterro da Cafetina (1971)
- Vida e Glória de um Canalha (1970)
- A Penúltima Donzela (1969)
- O Bravo Guerreiro (1969)
- As Duas Faces da Moeda (1969)
- Enfim Sós...Com o Outro (1968)
- O Homem que Comprou o Mundo (1968)
- Pintando o Sete (1960)
- O Homem do Sputnik (1959)
- De Vento em Popa (1957)
- Maior Que o Ódio (1951)
- O Falso Detetive (1951)
- O Cortiço (1945)
- Romance de um Mordedor (1944)
- Samba em Berlim (1943)
- A Sedução do Garimpo (1941)
- Entra na Farra (1941)
- Cisne Branco (1940)
- E o Circo Chegou (1940)
- Onde Estás Felicidade? (1939)
- Está Tudo Aí (1939)
- Maridinho de Luxo (1938)
- João Ninguém (1936)
- O Crime dos Banhados (1914)
