= Fajões =

- Civil parish
- Location in Portugal
- Coordinates: 40.918°N 8.422°W
- Country: Portugal
- Region: Norte
- Metropolitan area: Porto
- District: Aveiro
- Municipality: Oliveira de Azeméis

Area
  - Total: 8.12 km^{2} (3.14 sq mi)

Population (2011)
  - Total: 3,087
  - Density: 380/km^{2} (980/sq mi)
- Time zone: UTC+00:00 (WET)
  - Summer (DST): UTC+01:00 (WEST)

Fajões is a civil parish in the municipality of Oliveira de Azeméis, Portugal. The population in 2011 was 3,087, in an area of 8.12 km^{2}.
