= Carregosa =

- Civil parish
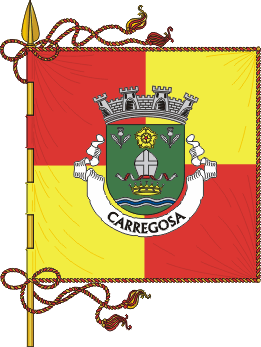
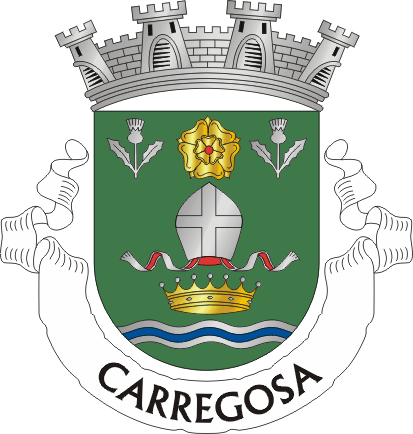
- Flag Coat of arms

- Location in Portugal
- Coordinates: 40.885°N 8.414°W
- Country: Portugal
- Region: Norte
- Metropolitan area: Porto
- District: Aveiro
- Municipality: Oliveira de Azeméis

Area
  - Total: 11.82 km^{2} (4.56 sq mi)

Population (2011)
  - Total: 3,419
  - Density: 290/km^{2} (750/sq mi)
- Time zone: UTC+00:00 (WET)
  - Summer (DST): UTC+01:00 (WEST)

Carregosa is a civil parish in the municipality of Oliveira de Azeméis, Portugal. The population in 2011 was 3,419, in an area of 11.82 km^{2}.
