= Better Days Ahead =

1990 film directed by Carlos Diegues

- Theatrical release poster
- Directed by: Carlos Diegues
- Written by: Antônio Calmon; Vicente Pereira; Vinícius Viannas; Carlos Diegues
- Produced by: Paulo Cesar Ferreira
- Starring: Marília Pêra; Paulo José; Zezé Motta; José Wilker; Rita Lee
- Cinematography: Lauro Escorel
- Edited by: Gilberto Santeiro
- Music by: Rita Lee; Roberto de Carvalho
- Production companies: Cininvest; Multiplic
- Distributed by: Embrafilme
- Release date: September 4, 1989
- Running time: 92 minutes
- Country: Brazil
- Language: Portuguese

Better Days Ahead (Portuguese: Dias Melhores Virão) is a 1989 Brazilian comedy-drama film directed by Carlos Diegues.

== Plot ==
The staff of a dubbing studio celebrates the announcement of a Brazilian dubbing of an acclaimed show called The Mary Shadow Show. Mary Shadow is played by brazilian biggest rockstar, Rita Lee. To dub the main character, Dalila (Zezé Motta) indicates her neighbor Marialva (Marília Pêra), who adopts the name "Mary Mattos" as she dreams about becoming a Hollywood star. Marialva lives tormented by the death of her former boyfriend, and finds refuge on Wallace (José Wilker), a married man who promises he will abandon his family to live with her.

Meanwhile, Pompeu (Paulo José), the dubbing director falls in love with Marialva and says he will direct a film starring her. After some dates, Marialva asks Pompeu to go to Jacarepaguá, the district where Wallace lives; when he notices she just wanted to Wallace, Pompeu abandons Marialva there. From the top of a tree, Marialva witnesses Wallace with his family as he dies of a heart attack. After this, Marialva says to Dalila she will quit from the job.

When Dalila asks her to translate a letter from an American admirer, Marialva discovers The Mary Shadow Show needs a new actress to play the role of Mary Shadow's maid. Without telling to no one, Marialva goes to Wallace's office, takes some money he had left, and travels to the United States aiming to get the role. In the end, Marialva gets the role and when a new episode from The Mary Shadow Show arrives at the dubbing studio, Pompeu, Dalila and the rest of staff are thrilled.

== Cast ==
- Marília Pêra as Marialva "Mary" Mattos
- Paulo José as Pompeu
- Zezé Motta as Dalila
- José Wilker as Wallace Caldeira
- Rita Lee as Mary Shadow
- Marilu Bueno as Adelaide
- Paulo César Pereio as Pereira
- Aurora Miranda as Aurora
- Antônio Pedro as Salgado
- Betina Vianny as Janete
- Benjamin Cattan as Ferreirão
- Patricio Bisso as Juanita
- Joffre Soares as Coronel

== Release ==
After a limited release on September 4, 1989, the film was first exhibited to general audience through TV Globo in the early 90s; thus, film distributors boycotted Better Days Ahead on its theatrical release on October 4, 1991.

== Reception ==
=== Awards and nominations ===
In 1990, Better Days Ahead won the Special Prize at the Denver Film Festival and Biarritz Film Festival. It won the 1991 Cartagena Film Festival in the categories Best Screenplay and Best Actress (Pêra). In addition, it was the Brazilian submission for the 62nd Academy Awards for Best Foreign Language Film, although it was not nominated.

== See also ==
- List of submissions to the 62nd Academy Awards for Best Foreign Language Film
- List of Brazilian submissions for the Academy Award for Best Foreign Language Film
