= A Grande Mentira =

- Genre: Telenovela
- Created by: Hedy Maia
- Directed by: Fábio Sabag; Marlos Andreucci
- Starring: Myrian Pérsia; Cláudio Marzo; Neuza Amaral; Edney Giovenazzi; Eloísa Mafalda; Gilberto Martinho
- Opening theme: "A Grande Mentira" by Lyrio Panicali
- Country of origin: Brazil
- Original language: Portuguese
- No. of episodes: 341

Production
- Running time: 30 minutes

Original release
- Network: TV Globo
- Release: 10 June 1968 – 4 July 1969

A Grande Mentira is a Brazilian telenovela produced and broadcast by TV Globo. It premiered on 10 June 1968 and ended on 4 July 1969, with a total of 341 episodes. It is the fifth "novela das sete" to be aired in its timeslot. It was created by Hedy Maia and directed by Fábio Sabag.

Because the tapes were reused, the novela is completely lost.

== Plot ==
Maria Cristina is a hardworking young woman who works as a cleaning lady and lives with an elderly woman named Elvira. After being hit by a car driven by millionaire Roberto Albuquerque Medeiros, she ends up falling in love with him.

Roberto is an outgoing and determined young man who works in his father Jorge Antônio’s companies. He lives in the family mansion with his father, his mother Veridiana—with whom he has a great relationship—and his sister Lenita.

When Maria Cristina is taken to the Albuquerque Medeiros mansion, she senses the family’s hostility, especially from Veridiana, who does everything she can to drive the couple apart.

Paulo Bacelar is also determined to put an end to the couple’s romance. Paulo is an unscrupulous executive and Roberto’s rival at Jorge Antônio’s companies. He is jealous of Roberto and wants to destroy him at any cost.

== Cast ==
Actor	Character
Myriam Pérsia	Maria Cristina
Cláudio Marzo	Roberto Albuquerque Medeiros
Neuza Amaral	Veridiana Albuquerque Medeiros
Edney Giovenazzi	Paulo Bacelar
Gilberto Martinho	Jorge Antônio Albuquerque Medeiros
Eloísa Mafalda	Elvira
Hélio Souto	Renato
Maria Helena Dias	Palmira Damasceno / Sandra
Roberto de Cleto	Othon Damasceno
Sônia Dutra	Lenita Albuquerque Medeiros
Felipe Wagner	Carlos Augusto
Yara Sarmento	Cláudia
Felipe Carone	André
Nilson Condé	Marcelo
Karin Rodrigues	Márcia
Regina Macedo	Rosana
Turíbio Ruiz	Heitor
Maria Pompeu	Gina
Dary Reis	Sérgio
Diana Morel	Beatriz
Paulo Pinheiro	Francisco (Chiquinho)
Henriqueta Brieba	Dedina
