= Oliveira de Azeméis =

- Municipality
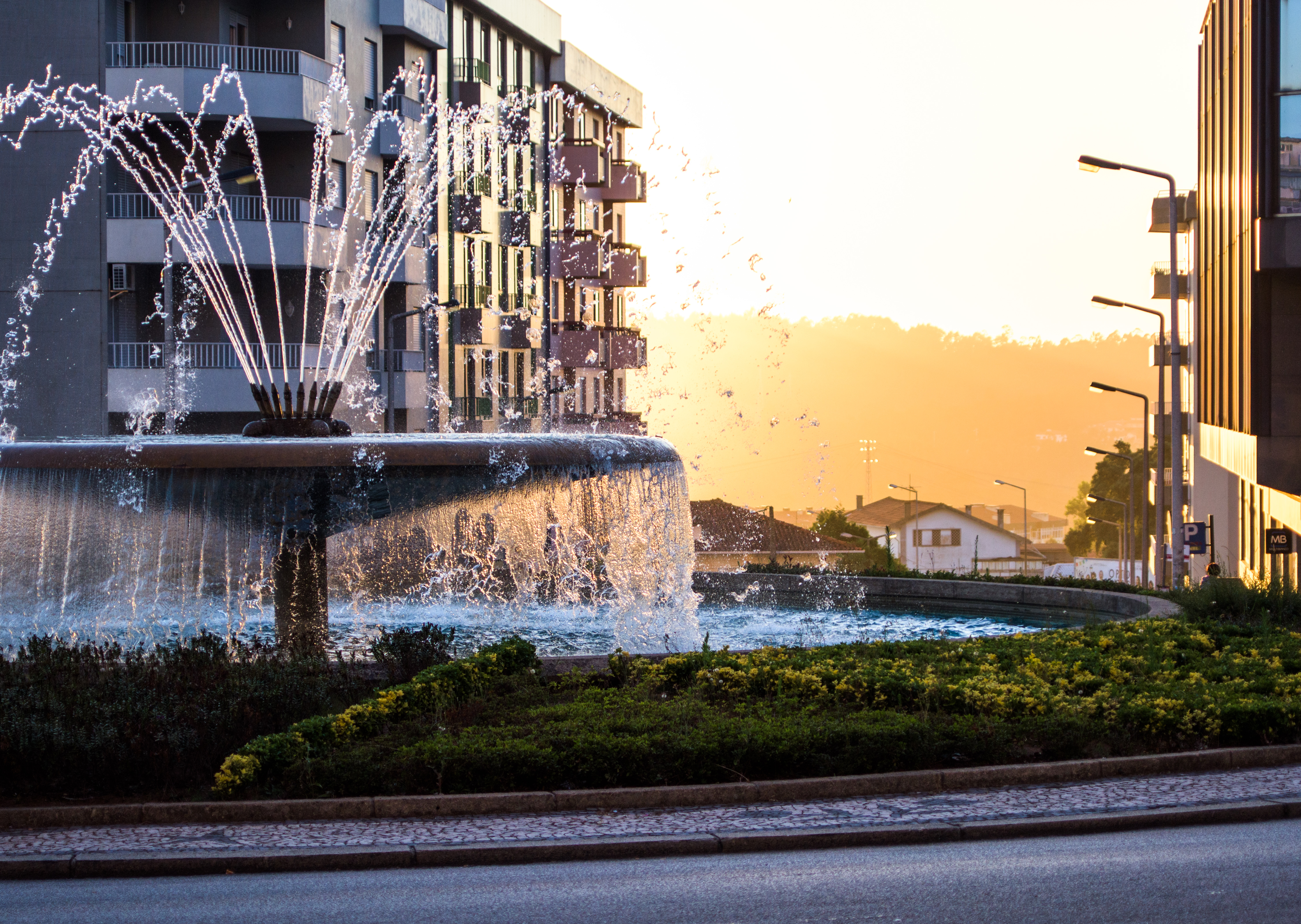
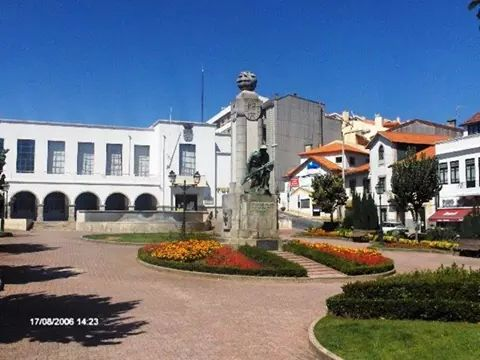
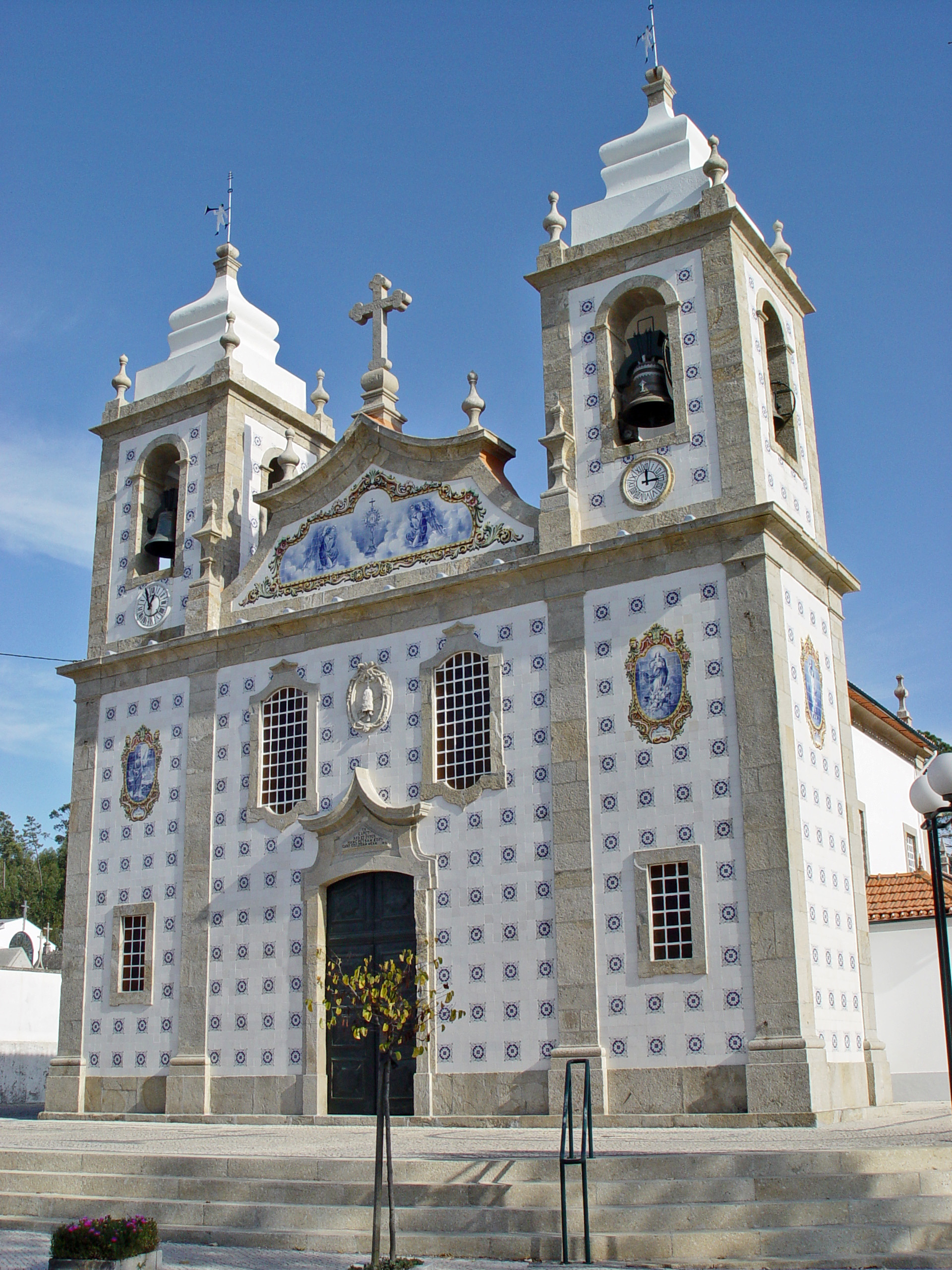
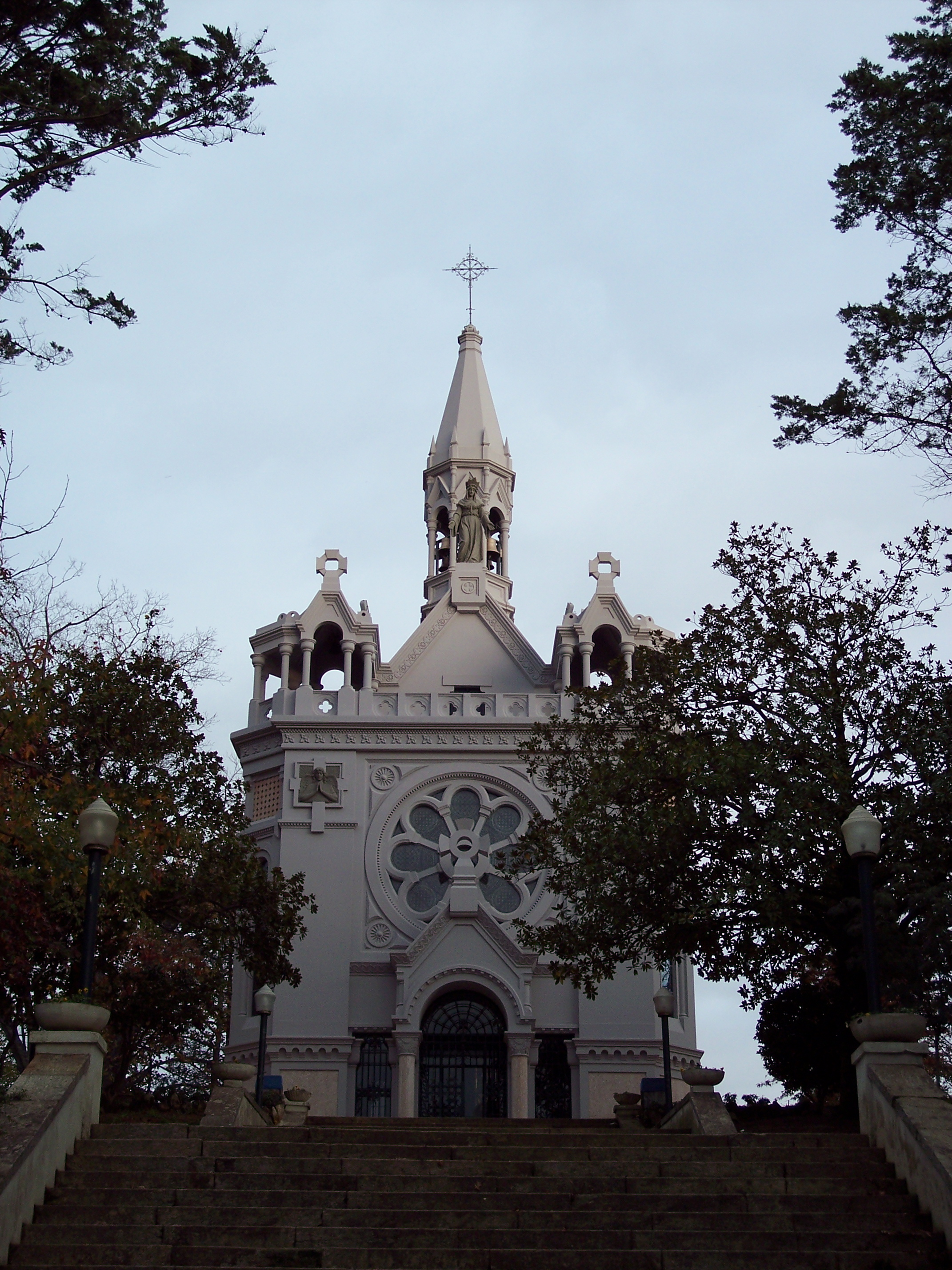
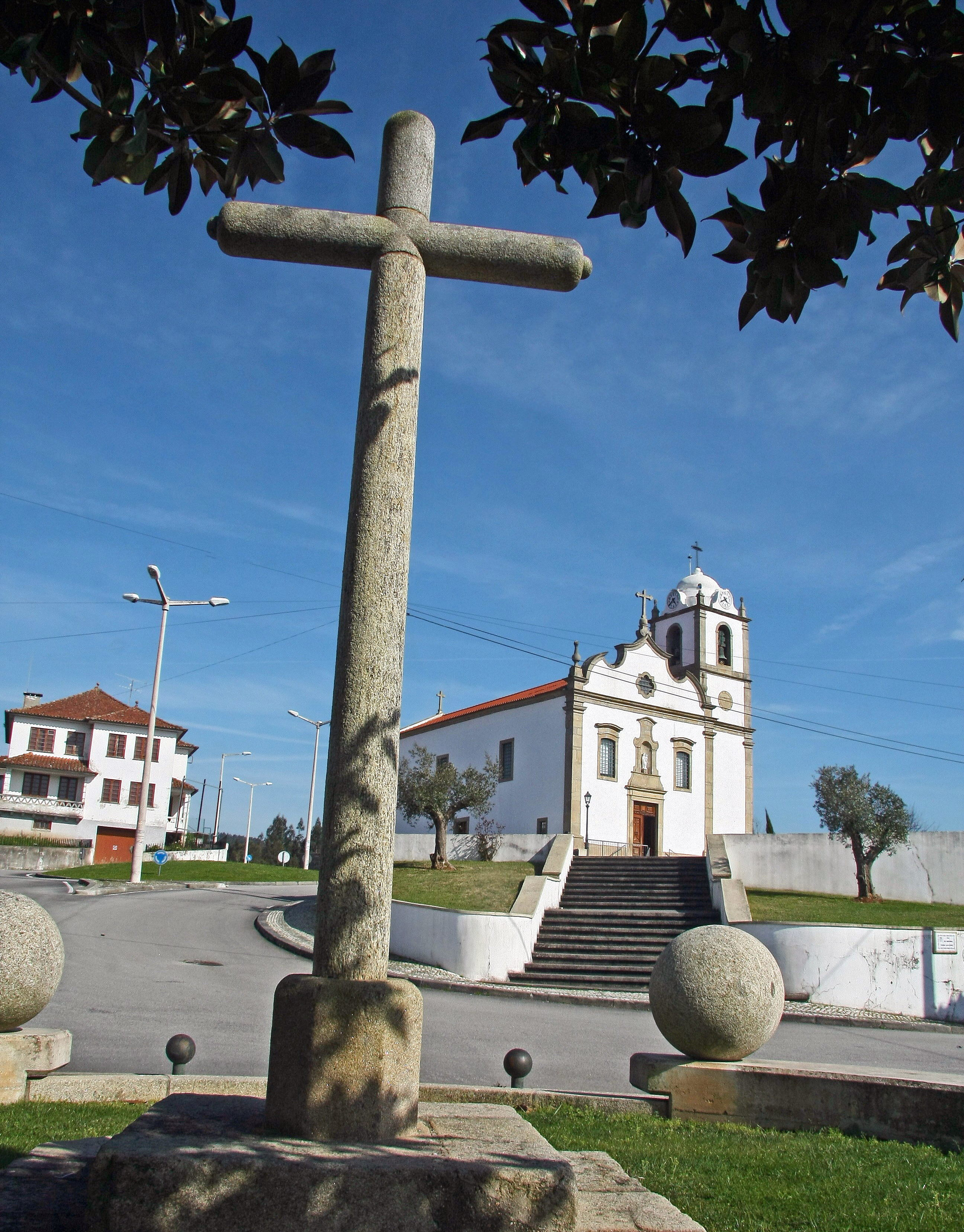
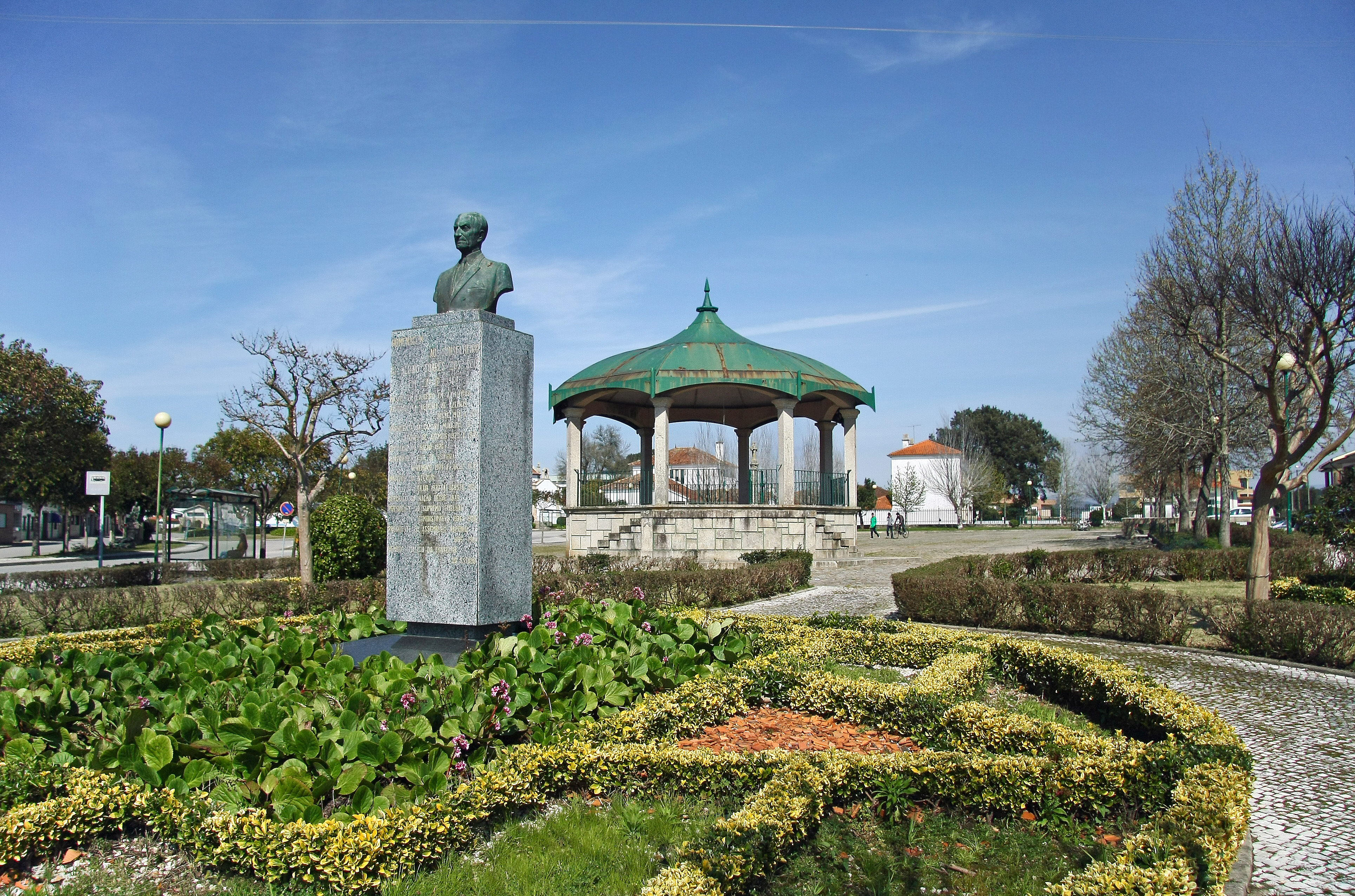
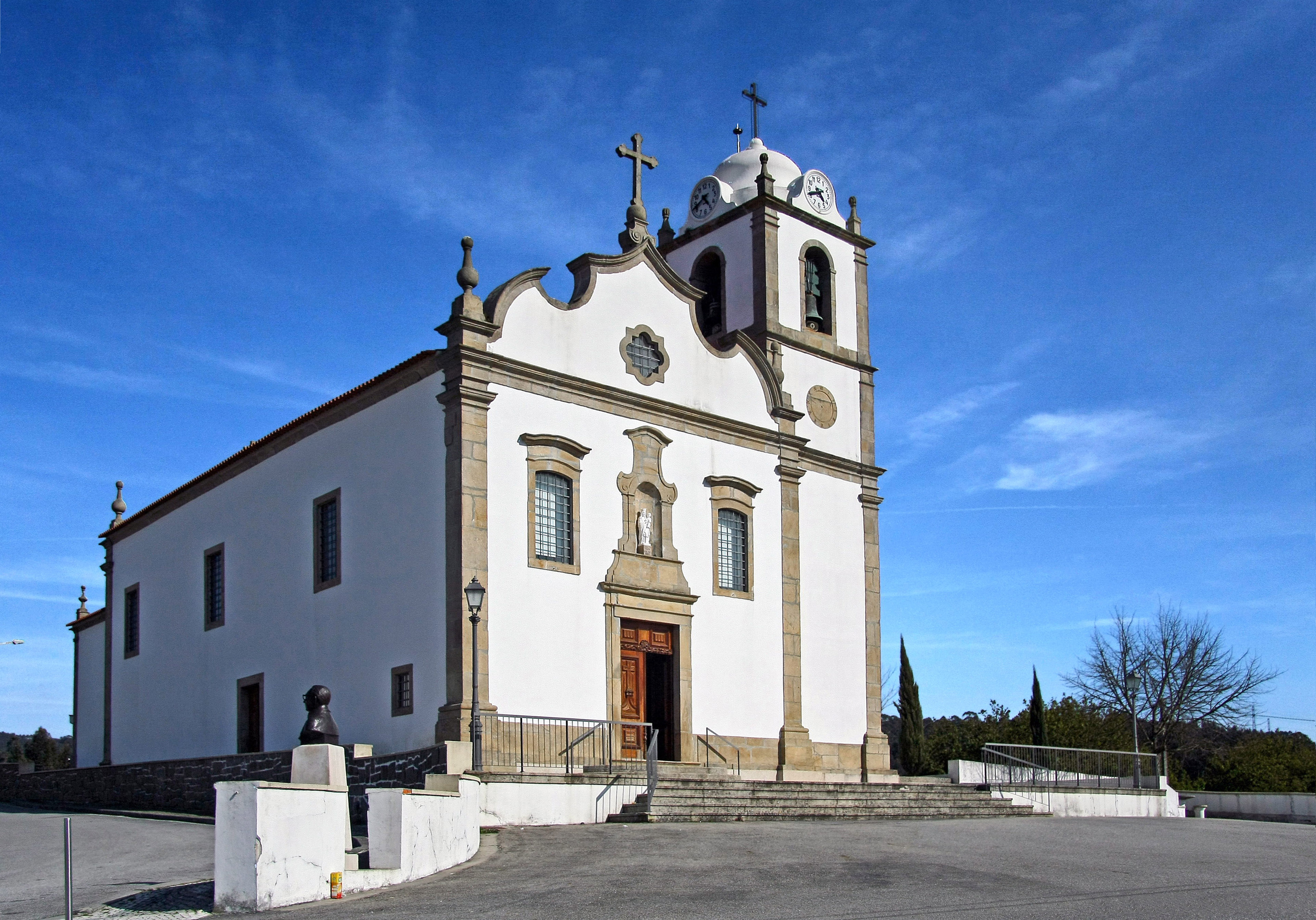

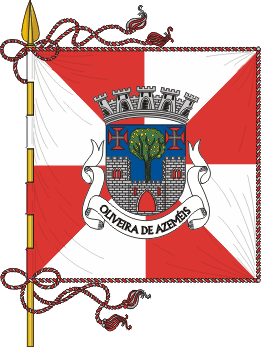
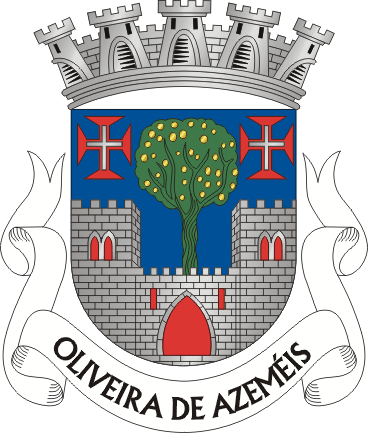
- Flag Coat of arms
- Interactive map of Oliveira de Azeméis
- Coordinates: 40°50′N 8°29′W
- Country: Portugal
- Region: Norte
- Metropolitan area: Porto
- District: Aveiro
- Parishes: 12

Government
  - President: Joaquim Jorge (PS)

Area
  - Total: 161.10 km^{2} (62.20 sq mi)

Population (2011)
  - Total: 68,611
  - Density: 425.89/km^{2} (1,103.1/sq mi)
- Time zone: UTC+00:00 (WET)
  - Summer (DST): UTC+01:00 (WEST)
- Website: www.cm-oaz.pt

Oliveira de Azeméis (Portuguese pronunciation: [ɔliˈvɐjɾɐ ðɨ ɐzɨˈmɐjʃ]) is a city and municipality in the Porto Metropolitan Area of Portugal. Administratively, the municipality belongs to the District of Aveiro. The population of the municipality in 2011 was 68,611, in an area of 161.10 km^{2}. The city itself has a population of about 20,000. Oliveira de Azeméis is 35 kilometres (22 mi) south of Porto, less than 20 kilometres (12 mi) from the Atlantic Ocean. The municipal holiday is the Monday following the second Sunday of August.

== Facilities ==
Local facilities include:

- Hospital de São Miguel
- Higher education schools
- Secondary schools
- Basic schools
- Regional museum
- Hotel
- Post Office
- Police station
- Clinic centres
- Tourism office
- Library – Biblioteca Municipal Ferreira de Castro

== Economy ==
Oliveira de Azeméis is an important industrial center, producing a variety of goods such as injection moulds, dairy produce, shoes, car components, steel tubes and other steel materials (Ferpinta), cookware (Silampos and CELAR), springs and mattresses. Among its best-known companies are Simoldes and Lactogal.

== Transport ==
The town has connections to the A1, A29 and A32 motorways and the IC2 expressway. It is served by Francisco Sá Carneiro Airport/Oporto's airport.

== Sports ==
Its most prominent sports club is the União Desportiva Oliveirense (U.D.O.), which fields teams in football, basketball and ring hockey as well as an affiliated cycling team that holds a UCI Continental team licence, the Kelly–Simoldes–UDO (UCI team code: KSU). Other names (that focus in football) include Futebol Clube Pinheirense (FCP), Sporting Clube de Bustelo (SCB), Futebol Clube Cesarense (FCC), Juventude Desportiva Carregosense (JDC), Grupo Desportivo de São Roque (GDSR), Atlético Clube de Cucujães (ACC), Real Clube Nogueirense (RCN) and Nome Futebol Clube Macieirense (FCM), with other sports such as futsal including Futsal Clube Azeméis (FCA), Pindelo Associação Recreativa e Cultural (PARC) and Grupo Cultural e Recreativo de Ossela (GCRO). They have a children's school in partnership with Benfica from Lisbon.

== Demographics ==
Historical population

Year	Pop.	±%
1864	23,687	—
1878	23,734	+0.2%
1890	24,943	+5.1%
1900	26,391	+5.8%
1911	29,628	+12.3%
1920	30,304	+2.3%
1930	33,072	+9.1%
1940	37,434	+13.2%

Year	Pop.	±%
1950	41,370	+10.5%
1960	46,263	+11.8%
1970	56,052	+21.2%
1981	62,821	+12.1%
1991	66,846	+6.4%
2001	70,721	+5.8%
2011	68,611	−3.0%
2021	66,175	−3.6%

Source: INE

== Parishes ==
Administratively, the municipality is divided into 12 civil parishes (freguesias):

- Carregosa
- Cesar
- Fajões
- Loureiro
- Macieira de Sarnes
- Nogueira do Cravo e Pindelo
- Oliveira de Azeméis, Santiago de Riba-Ul, Ul, Macinhata da Seixa e Madail
- Ossela
- Pinheiro da Bemposta, Travanca e Palmaz
- São Martinho da Gândara
- São Roque
- Vila de Cucujães

== Cities and towns ==
There is one city in the municipality: Oliveira de Azeméis. The towns are

- Carregosa
- Cesar
- Fajões
- Loureiro
- Nogueira do Cravo
- Pinheiro da Bemposta
- Vila Chã de São Roque
- Vila de Cucujães

== Marian sanctuary ==
In the centre there is a Marian sanctuary, La-Salette. It was built to honor the apparitions of the Virgin Mary in the small village of La Salette, Isère, in France. The sanctuary contains the finger of a burglar who tried to steal precious artifacts one night (a guard shot the burglar with his shotgun and only hit his finger). The finger is preserved in a jar of alcohol in front of the chapel.

== Notable people ==
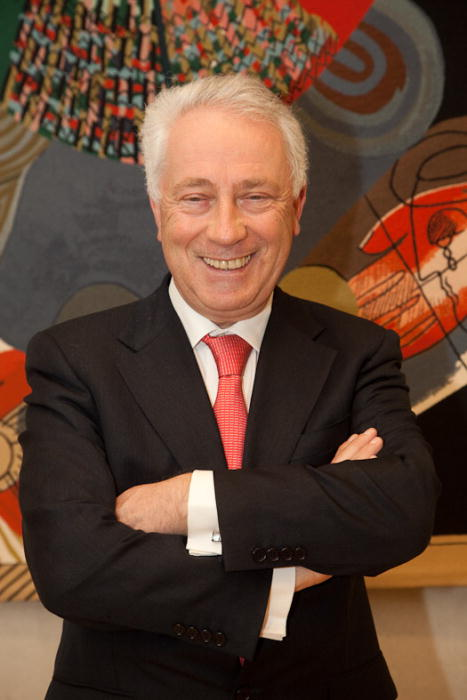
Carlos da Silva Costa, 2015

- Bento Carqueja (1860-1907), Director of O Commercio do Porto, Professor of Agriculture and Economy, First patent in telephotography
- Abel Pêra (1891 in Carregosa – 1975), Portuguese actor based in Brazil.
- Manuel Pêra (1894 in Carregosa – 1967), Portuguese actor based in Brazil.
- Ferreira de Castro (1898–1974), Portuguese social realist writer and journalist.
- Julieta Gandra (1917–2007), doctor, imprisoned for supporting the Angolan War of Independence
- Carlos da Silva Costa (born 1949), economist, Governor of the Bank of Portugal, 2010–2020

=== Sport ===
- Adelino Teixeira (born 1952), Portuguese retired footballer with 322 club caps and 12 for Portugal
- Bruno Neves (1981–2008), Portuguese professional road racing cyclist
- Cátia Azevedo (born 1994), Portuguese 400-metre sprinter, competed in the 2016 Summer Olympics
- João Domingues (born 1993), Portuguese professional tennis player having achieved n. 150 in the ATP ranking. He represented Portugal in the Davis Cup team from 2015 to 2019.
