= Atlântida Cinematográfica =

Brazilian film studio

Atlântida Cinematográfica was a Brazilian film studio, founded 18 September 1941 in Rio de Janeiro by Moacir Fenelon and José Carlos Burle. It produced a total of 66 films before 1962, when it ceased operations, having become the most successful film production company in Brazil. having become the most successful film production company in Brazil. In 1947, the powerful film exhibitor and distributor Luiz Severiano Ribeiro Júnior became the majority shareholder of the studio, securing its financial dominance.

The studio's first feature-length production was the 1943 drama Moleque Tião, which was inspired by the life of its star, Grande Otelo; tragically, the original film was lost in a devastating fire at the Atlântida studios in the 1950s. The studio's greatest commercial success, however, came from the genre known as chanchada, low-budget films with great popular appeal, such as Nem Sansão nem Dalila, Carlos Manga's Matar ou Correr, and Watson Macedo's Aviso aos navegantes featuring Anselmo Duarte. This genre dominated the market until the mid-1950s, promoting such artists as Grande Otelo, Oscarito, Zé Trindade, Cyl Farney, Eliana Macedo, Julie Bardot, and Fada Santoro.
