= Marino Pinto =

Marino do Espírito Santo Pinto (Bom Jardim, 18 July 1916 – Rio de Janeiro, 28 January 1965) was a Brazilian composer of over 300 light classical songs. Among his best known works was Distância, the signature bolero of singer Dalva de Oliveira, written to the text "Se acaso estás distante de mim" by the Brazilian lyricist Mário Rossi.
