= Coisa de Acender =

Studio album by Djavan
- Released: 1992
- Recorded: July – October 1991
- Genre: MPB
- Length: 41:28
- Label: Sony Music
- Producers: Ronnie Foster, Djavan

Professional ratings
Review scores
Source	Rating
Allmusic	4/5 stars

Coisa de Acender is a 1992 album by Brazilian singer and songwriter Djavan, released by Sony Music.

Praised by critics and musicians, the album is more pop than his previous ones. Among the successes are the first four tracks: "Se..." (one of his biggest hits in the 1990s), "Boa Noite"," "A Rota do Indíviduo" (later called "Ferrugem," after his partnership with Orlando Morais), and "Linha do Equador" (recorded by Caetano Veloso in the future).

== Track listing ==
#	Title	Songwriters	Length
1.	"A rota do indivíduo (Ferrugem)"	Djavan, Orlando Morais	4:23
2.	"Boa noite"	Djavan	5:49
3.	"Se..."	Djavan	4:52
4.	"Linha do Equador"	Djavan, Caetano Veloso	4:34
5.	"Violeiros"	Djavan	4:49
6.	"Andaluz"	Djavan, Flávia Virgínia	3:54
7.	"Outono"	Djavan	4:17
8.	"Alívio"	Djavan, Arthur Maia	4:32
9.	"Baile"	Djavan	3:45

== Personnel ==
Personnel include:

- Djavan: vocals, acoustic guitar, percussion (in "Boa noite" and "Se...") and arrangements
- Torcuato Mariano: electric guitar (in "Boa noite", "Alívio" and "Baile") and acoustic guitar (in "Linha do Equador" and "Violeiros")
- Arthur Maia: bass
- Carlos Bala: drums
- Ronnie Foster: keyboards (in "Boa noite" and "Alívio")
- Paulo Calazans: keyboards (all tracks except "Violeiros")
- Glauton Campello: keyboards (all tracks) and piano
- Marcelo Martins: saxophone, flute and keyboards (in "Alívio")

Special guests:

- Luís Jakha: percussion (in "Boa noite" and "Violeiros")
- Marcos Suzano: percussion (in "Linha do Equador")
- Marco Lobo: percussion (in "Linha do Equador")
- Flávia Virgínia: vocals (in "Boa noite", "Se..." and "Andaluz")
- Be Happy: vocals (in "Boa noite" and "Andaluz")
- Cecília Spyer: vocals (in "Se...")
- Eveline Hecker: vocals (in "Se...")
- Beth Bruno: vocals (in "Se...")
- Kika Tristão: vocals (in "Se...")

Orchestra members (in "A rota do indivíduo (Ferrugem)"):

- Jorge del Barrio: arrangement and conducting
- Endre Granat: violin
- Alex Horvath: violin
- John Scanlon: viola
- Richard Treat: cello

== Certifications ==
Certifications for "Coisa de Acender"
Region	Certification	Certified units/sales
Brazil (Pro-Música Brasil)	Platinum	250,000^{‡}
^{‡} Sales+streaming figures based on certification alone.
