= A Moreninha (TV series) =

- Genre: Telenovela
- Created by: Otávio Graça Mello
- Directed by: Otávio Graça Mello
- Starring: Marília Pêra
- Country of origin: Brazil
- Original language: Portuguese
- No. of episodes: 35

Production
- Running time: 50 minutes

Original release
- Network: TV Globo
- Release: 25 October – 10 December 1965

A Moreninha is a Brazilian telenovela produced and broadcast by TV Globo. It premiered on 25 October 1965 and ended on 10 December 1965, with a total of 35 episodes. It became the second "novela das sete" to be aired in the timeslot. It was created by Moysés Weltman and directed by Otávio Graça Mello.

== Cast ==
Actor	Character
Marília Pêra	Carolina
Cláudio Marzo	Augusto
Iracema de Alencar	Vó Donana
Gracindo Júnior	Felipe
Thaís Portinho	Joana
Emiliano Queiroz	Fabrício
Yara Sarmento	D. Lúcia
Milton Gonçalves	Simão
Zezé Macedo	Zezé
Lafayette Galvão	Leopoldo
Paulo Porto	André
Cláudia Martins	Nazaré
Renato Machado	Renato
