= Não É Azul Mas É Mar =

Não É Azul, Mas É Mar

Studio album by Djavan
- Released: 1987
- Studio: Ameraycan Studios
- Genre: MPB
- Length: 45:25
- Label: Sony Music
- Producer: Ronnie Foster, Djavan

Não é Azul, Mas é Mar (in English "It's not blue, but it's [the] sea") is an album by musician, singer, and composer Djavan released in 1987 by Sony Records. Recorded in Los Angeles, California, and co-produced by Ronnie Foster with Djavan, it was sold in Brazil, the United States, Japan, and some European countries. The major hits from the album are "Soweto", "Dou-não-Dou" (one of the major hits of the album selected to enter the soundtrack of Brazilian soap "Mandala" in 1987) and some other prominent among audiences and critics alike: "Florio", "Real", "Doidice", "Navio" e "Carnaval do Rio".

== Tracks ==
- All songs written by Djavan, except where noted.
1. Soweto
2. Bouquet
3. Me Leve
4. Dou-Não-Dou
5. Florir
6. Carnaval do Rio
7. Navio (Flávia Vírginia/Max Frederico/Djavan)
8. Maçã
9. Real (Tetsuo Sakurai/Djavan)
10. Doidice
