= Oscarito =

Brazilian actor (1906–1970)

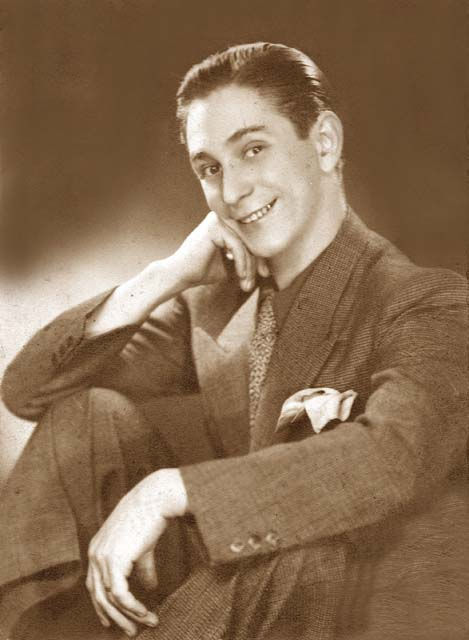
- Oscarito in 1928
- Born: August 16, 1906; Alameda, Andalusia, Spain
- Died: August 4, 1970 (aged 63); Rio de Janeiro, Brazil
- Occupation: Actor
- Years active: 1914–1970

Oscarito, stage name of Oscar Lorenzo Jacinto de la Inmaculada Concepción Teresa Diaz (August 16, 1906 – August 4, 1970) was a Spanish-born Brazilian actor, considered to be one of the most popular comedians of Brazil.

== Life ==
Born in a family of circus comedians, came to Brazil when he was one year old, but only became a naturalized citizen in 1949.

Made his debut in the circus at age five in 1914, where he learned to play the violin, besides being a clown, trapeze artist, acrobat and actor.

Made his debut in the revues in 1932, in the play Calma, Gegê, satirizing dictator Getúlio Vargas.

Made his debut in the cinema in Noites Cariocas (1935), although he had been an extra in a previous film (A Voz do Carnaval, 1933). He reached utmost fame with the comic duo he formed with Grande Otelo, in comedies directed by Carlos Manga and Watson Macedo.

He was married to Margot Louro and had two children, José Carlos and Mirian Thereza. In the morning of July 15, 1970, he suffered a stroke and was hospitalized, already in a coma. He died on August 4. His body was laid in the main hall of the Assembleia Legislativa do Rio de Janeiro, with the presence of more than two thousand people. The burial had the presence of five hundred people in the Cemitério São João Batista.

== Filmography ==
- 1975 – Assim era a Atlântida
- 1968 – Jovens Para Frente
- 1967 – A Espiã que Entrou em Fria
- 1965 – Crônica da Cidade Amada
- 1962 – Os Apavorados
- 1962 – Entre Mulheres e Espiões
- 1960 – Dois Ladrões
- 1960 – Duas Histórias
- 1959 – O Cupim
- 1959 – Pintando o Sete
- 1959 – O Homem do Sputnik
- 1958 – Esse Milhão é Meu
- 1957 – De Vento em Popa
- 1957 – Treze Cadeiras
- 1956 – Vamos com Calma
- 1956 – Colégio de Brotos
- 1956 – Papai Fanfarrão
- 1955 – O Golpe
- 1955 – Guerra ao Samba
- 1954 – Matar ou Correr
- 1954 – Nem Sansão nem Dalila
- 1953 – Dupla do Barulho
- 1952 – Três Vagabundos
- 1952 – Carnaval Atlântida
- 1952 – Barnabé, tu és meu
- 1951 – Aí Vem o Barão
- 1950 – Aviso aos Navegantes .... Frederico
- 1949 – Carnaval no Fogo
- 1949 – Caçula do Barulho
- 1948 – É com Este que Eu Vou
- 1948 – Falta Alguém no Manicômio
- 1948 – E o Mundo se Diverte
- 1947 – Asas do Brasil
- 1947 – Este Mundo é um Pandeiro
- 1946 – Fantasma por Acaso
- 1945 – Não Adianta Chorar
- 1944 – Gente Honesta
- 1944 – Tristezas não Pagam Dívidas
- 1942 – Os Malandrões
- 1941 – O Dia é Nosso
- 1941 – Vinte e Quatro Horas de Sonho
- 1940 – Céu Azul
- 1938 – Banana da Terra
- 1938 – Bombonzinho
- 1938 – Está Tudo Aí!
- 1936 – Alô, Alô Carnaval
- 1935 – Noites Cariocas
- 1933 – A Voz do Carnaval
