= 2011 in Brazil =

Events in the year 2011 in Brazil.

== Incumbents ==
=== Federal government ===
- President: Dilma Rousseff
- Vice President: Michel Temer

=== Governors ===
- Acre:
  - Binho Marques (until 1 January)
  - Tião Viana (starting 1 January)
- Alagoas: Teotônio Vilela Filho
- Amapa: Camilo Capiberibe (starting 1 January)
- Amazonas: Omar Aziz
- Bahia: Jaques Wagner
- Ceará: Cid Gomes
- Espírito Santo: Paulo Hartung
- Goiás:
  - Alcides Rodrigues (until 1 January)
  - Marconi Perillo (starting 1 January)
- Maranhão: Roseana Sarney
- Mato Grosso: Silval da Cunha
- Mato Grosso do Sul: André Puccinelli
- Minas Gerais: Antônio Anastasia
- Pará:
  - Ana Júlia Carepa (until 1 January)
  - Simão Jatene (starting 1 January)
- Paraíba: Ricardo Coutinho
- Paraná:
  - Orlando Pessuti (until 1 January)
  - Beto Richa (starting 1 January)
- Pernambuco: Eduardo Campos
- Piauí: Wilson Martins
- Rio de Janeiro: Sérgio Cabral Filho
- Rio Grande do Norte:
  - Iberê Paiva Ferreira de Souza (until 1 January)
  - Rosalba Ciarlini Rosado (starting 1 January)
- Rio Grande do Sul:
  - Yeda Rorato Crusius (until 1 January)
  - Tarso Genro (starting 1 January)
- Rondônia:
  - João Aparecido Cahulla (until 1 January)
  - Confúcio Moura (starting 1 January)
- Roraima: José de Anchieta Júnior
- Santa Catarina:
  - Leonel Pavan (until 1 January)
  - Raimundo Colombo (starting 1 January)
- São Paulo:
  - Alberto Goldman (until 1 January)
  - Geraldo Alckmin (starting 1 January)
- Sergipe: Marcelo Déda
- Tocantins:
  - Carlos Henrique Gaguim (until 1 January)
  - José Wilson Siqueira Campos (starting 1 January)

=== Vice governors ===
- Acre: Carlos César Correia de Messias
- Alagoas:
  - José Wanderley Neto (until 1 January)
  - José Thomaz da Silva Nonô Neto (starting 1 January)
- Amapá:
  - Pedro Paulo Dias de Carvalho (until 1 January)
  - Doralice Nascimento de Souza (starting 1 January)
- Amazonas:
  - Omar José Abdel Aziz (until 1 January)
  - José Melo de Oliveira (starting 1 January)
- Bahia:
  - Edmundo Pereira Santos (until 1 January)
  - Otto Alencar (starting 1 January)
- Ceará:
  - Francisco José Pinheiro (until 1 January)
  - Domingos Gomes de Aguiar Filho (starting 1 January)
- Espírito Santo:
  - Ricardo de Rezende Ferraço (until 1 January)
  - Givaldo Vieira da Silva (starting 1 January)
- Goiás:
  - Ademir de Oliveira Meneses (until 1 January)
  - José Eliton de Figueiredo Júnior (starting 1 January)
- Maranhão:
  - João Alberto Souza (until 1 January)
  - Joaquim Washington Luiz de Oliveira (starting 1 January)
- Mato Grosso:
  - Silval da Cunha Barbosa (until 1 January)
  - Francisco Tarquínio Daltro (starting 1 January)
- Mato Grosso do Sul:
  - Murilo Zauith (until 1 January)
  - Simone Tebet (starting 1 January)
- Minas Gerais:
  - Antonio Augusto Junho Anastasia (until 1 January)
  - Alberto Pinto Coelho Júnior (starting 1 January)
- Pará:
  - Odair Santos Corrêa (until 1 January)
  - Helenilson Cunha Pontes (starting 1 January)
- Paraíba:
  - Luciano Cartaxo Pires de Sá (until 1 January)
  - Rômulo José de Gouveia (starting 1 January)
- Paraná:
  - Orlando Pessuti (until 1 January)
  - Flávio José Arns (starting 1 January)
- Pernambuco: João Soares Lyra Neto
- Piauí: Antônio José de Moraes Souza Filho
- Rio de Janeiro: Luiz Fernando Pezão
- Rio Grande do Norte: Robinson Faria (starting 1 January)
- Rio Grande do Sul:
  - Paulo Afonso Girardi Feijó (until 1 January)
  - Jorge Alberto Duarte Grill (starting 1 January)
- Rondônia: Airton Pedro Gurgacz (starting 1 January)
- Roraima: Francisco de Assis Rodrigues (starting 1 January)
- Santa Catarina: Eduardo Pinho Moreira
- São Paulo: Guilherme Afif Domingos (starting 1 January)
- Sergipe:
  - Belivaldo Chagas Silva (until 1 January)
  - Jackson Barreto (starting 1 January)
- Tocantins:
  - Eduardo Machado Silva (until 1 January)
  - João Oliveira de Sousa (starting 1 January)

== Events ==
=== January ===
- January 1: Inauguration of Dilma Rousseff as the 36th President of Brazil.
- January 11: January 2011 Rio de Janeiro floods and mudslides: Over 900 people are killed as a result of freak weather conditions.

=== February ===
- February 12: The New Party (NOVO) is founded by engineer João Amoêdo; focusing on the position of economic liberalism.

=== March ===
- March 17: Brazil and other countries abstain in a United Nations resolution against Libya.
- March 17-19: US President Barack Obama makes a three day visit to Brazil to meet with President Dilma Rousseff.

=== April ===
- April 7: Rio de Janeiro school shooting: Eleven children aged between 12 and 14 are killed, while 22 others seriously wounded after a former student opened fire at an elementary school in Realengo. The perpetrator would then commit suicide.

=== May ===
- May 5: The Federal Supreme Court unanimously decides that homosexual couples can sign stable union contracts, as well as heterosexual couples.

=== June ===
- June 7: Chief of Staff of the Presidency, Antonio Palocci, resigns after several corruption scandals.
- June 8: The Supreme Federal Court decides by 6 votes to 3, for the release of Italian terrorist, Cesare Battisti; after serving four years in prison.

=== July ===
- July 13: A Noar Linhas Aéreas Let L-410 Turbolet crashes in Boa Viagem, Recife; killing all 16 people on board.
- July 14: A sunken World War II German submarine, U-513, is discovered by a Schurmann Family expedition off the coast of Santa Catarina.
- July 23: Miss Brasil 2011

=== September ===
- September 12: Miss Universe 2011 held at the Credicard Hall in São Paulo.

=== October ===
- October 13: An explosion occurred at a restaurant in Rio de Janeiro, killing four people and injuring seventeen.

=== November ===
- November 7: A Chevron-owned oil well began leaking, causing 32,000 to 52,000 litres (200 to 330 bbl) of crude oil to enter the ocean every day. The leak took place in Campos Basin, Brazil 120 kilometres (75 mi) off the coast of Rio de Janeiro.
- November 18: President Dilma Rousseff signs the law creating the National Truth Commission.

== Deaths ==
=== January ===
- January 5: Lily Marinho, socialite (b. 1920)
- January 19: Ramiro Saraiva Guerreiro, politician (b. 1918)

=== February ===
- February 8: Luiz Bueno, race car driver (b. 1937)
- February 18: Paulo de Tarso Alvim, biologist (b. 1919)

=== March ===
- March 29: José Alencar, 23rd vice president of Brazil (b. 1931)

=== May ===
- May 21: Cecilia Miranda de Carvalho, singer (b. 1913)

=== July ===
- July 2: Itamar Franco, 33rd president of Brazil (b. 1929)

=== August ===
- August 2: Ítalo Rossi, actor (b. 1931)

=== December ===
- December 4: Sócrates, footballer (b. 1954)
- December 17: Joãosinho Trinta, director of parades for Samba Schools in Rio de Janeiro during Carnival (b. 1933)

== Founded ==
- Baby.com.br
- BemSimples (discontinued 2014)

=== Football clubs ===
- Conilon Futebol Clube de Jaguaré, Galvez Esporte Clube, Esporte Clube Iranduba da Amazônia, Sabiá Futebol Clube, Serra Talhada Futebol Clube.

== Sport ==
=== Football ===
- 2011 in Brazilian football
- Santos FC lose the 2011 FIFA Club World Cup Final to FC Barcelona (0-4).

=== Tennis ===
- 2011 Brasil Open
- 2011 São Léo Open
- 2011 ATP Challenger Tour Finals
- 2011 Tetra Pak Tennis Cup

=== Volleyball ===
- 2011 FIVB Volleyball Men's U21 World Championship
- 2011 Men's South American Volleyball Championship
- 2011 Women's South American Volleyball Club Championship

=== Racing ===
- 2011 Brazilian Grand Prix
- 2011 Formula 3 Brazil Open
- 2011 São Paulo Indy 300
- 2011 Desafio Internacional das Estrelas
- 2011 FIA WTCC Race of Brazil
- 2011 Formula 3 Sudamericana season
- 2011 GT Brasil season
- 2011 Formula Future Fiat season
- 2011 Fórmula Truck season
- 2011 Copa Chevrolet Montana season
- 2011 Brasileiro de Marcas season
- 2011 Stock Car Brasil season
- 2011 Trofeo Linea Brasil season

=== Rugby ===
- 2011 CONSUR Sevens
- 2011 South American Rugby Championship "A"

=== Handball ===
- 2011 Pan American Women's Handball Championship
- 2011 World Women's Handball Championship

=== Misc ===
- 2011 Brazil Masters
- UFC 134
- 2011 Military World Games held in Rio de Janeiro.
- Brazil at the 2011 Pan American Games
- Brazil at the 2011 World Aquatics Championships
- Brazil at the 2011 Summer Universiade
- Brazil at the 2011 Winter Universiade
- Brazil at the 2011 World Championships in Athletics

== Film ==
- List of Brazilian films of 2011

== Music ==
- RPM reunite.
- May 2: Exxótica stop performing.

== Television ==
=== Launched ===
- Agora é Tarde
- A Mulher Invisível
- A Vida da Gente
- Amor e Revolução
- Aquele Beijo
- Brilhante F.C.
- Cordel Encantado
- Fina Estampa
- Insensato Coração
- Morde & Assopra
- O Astro
- Rebelde
- Se Ela Dança, Eu Danço
- Trunk Train
- Vidas em Jogo

=== Ended ===
- Anabel
- Cordel Encantado
- Fudêncio e Seus Amigos
- Hipertensão
- Insensato Coração
- Morde & Assopra
- O Astro
- Passione (telenovela)
- Ribeirão do Tempo
- Show do Tom
- The Buzz

== See also ==
- 2011 in Brazilian football
