= 1985 in Brazil =

The following events occurred in Brazil in the year 1985.

== Incumbents ==
=== Federal government ===
- President:
  - General João Figueiredo (until 14 March)
  - José Sarney (starting 15 March)
- Vice President:
  - Aureliano Chaves (until 14 March)
  - Vacant (from 15 March)

=== Governors ===
- Acre: Nabor Júnior
- Alagoas: Divaldo Suruagy
- Amazonas: Gilberto Mestrinho
- Bahia: João Durval Carneiro
- Ceará: Gonzaga Mota
- Espírito Santo: Gerson Camata
- Goiás: Iris Rezende
- Maranhão: Luís Rocha
- Mato Grosso: Júlio Campos
- Mato Grosso do Sul: Wilson Barbosa Martins
- Minas Gerais: Hélio Garcia
- Pará: Jader Barbalho
- Paraíba: Wilson Braga
- Paraná: José Richa
- Pernambuco: Roberto Magalhães
- Piauí: Hugo Napoleão
- Rio de Janeiro: Leonel Brizola
- Rio Grande do Norte: José Agripino Maia
- Rio Grande do Sul: Jair de Oliveira Soares
- Rondônia:
  - Jorge Teixeira de Oliveira (until 13 May)
  - Ângelo Angelin (from 13 May)
- Santa Catarina: Esperidião Amin
- São Paulo: André Franco Montoro
- Sergipe: João Alves Filho

=== Vice governors ===
- Acre: Iolanda Ferreira Lima Fleming
- Alagoas: José de Medeiros Tavares
- Amazonas: Manoel Henriques Ribeiro
- Bahia: Edvaldo de Oliveira Flores
- Ceará: José Adauto Bezerra
- Espírito Santo: José Moraes
- Goiás: Onofre Quinan
- Maranhão: João Rodolfo Ribeiro Gonçalves
- Mato Grosso: Wilmar Peres de Faria
- Mato Grosso do Sul: Ramez Tebet
- Minas Gerais: vacant
- Pará: Laércio Dias Franco
- Paraíba: José Carlos da Silva Júnior
- Paraná: João Elísio Ferraz de Campos
- Pernambuco: Gustavo Krause Gonçalves Sobrinho
- Piauí: José Raimundo Bona Medeiros
- Rio de Janeiro: Darcy Ribeiro
- Rio Grande do Norte: Radir Pereira
- Rio Grande do Sul: Cláudio Ênio Strassburger
- Santa Catarina: Victor Fontana
- São Paulo: Orestes Quércia
- Sergipe: Antônio Carlos Valadares

== Events ==
=== January ===
- January 11: The first edition of the Rock In Rio festival takes place in Cidade do Rock at Barra da Tijuca featuring performances from Queen and Iron Maiden.
- January 15: Tancredo Neves is elected President of Brazil by 480 votes against 180 for Paulo Maluf in the indirect presidential election, which brings an end to the military regime.
- January 20: Inauguration of the São Paulo-Guarulhos International Airport.

=== February ===
- February 8: The first Brazilian artificial satellite, Brasilsat A1, is launched from the Kourou launch base in French Guiana.

=== March ===
- 14 March: President-elect Tancredo Neves is admitted to the Emergency Room of the Hospital de Base in the Federal District.
- 15 March:
  - Vice President José Sarney, upon becoming vice president, assumes the duties of President of Brazil, as the new President Tancredo Neves had become severely ill, the day before.
  - The Ministry of Culture is established.

=== April ===
- 21 April: Brazilian President Tancredo Neves dies and is succeeded by Vice President José Sarney. The vice president post is left vacant until 1990.

=== May ===
- 8 May: The National Congress of Brazil approves the constitutional amendment, which establishes direct elections for President of the Republic with two rounds and fixed date, as well as for mayors of the capitals.

=== June ===
- 6 June: The remains of Josef Mengele, the physician notorious for Nazi human experimentation on inmates of Auschwitz concentration camp, buried in 1979 under the name of Wolfgang Gerhard, are exhumed in Embu das Artes, Brazil.

=== September ===
- 30 September: Severe hail storm, with ice stones weighing up to 1 kg, hits the municipality of Itabirinha, in the Rio Doce Valley, inland Minas Gerais. Around 50% of the homes in the urban core were affected, including 900 homes damaged and 50 completely destroyed, leaving more than 20 people dead and 600 injured. Of the approximately 10,000 inhabitants, 4,000 were left homeless.

== Births ==
=== January ===
- January 1 – Tiago Splitter, coach and former basketball player
- January 4:
  - Fernando Rees, racing driver
  - Réver, footballer
- January 5 – Wellington Saci, footballer

=== April ===
- April 1 – Danilo Caçador, footballer (d. 2018)
- April 7 – Ariela Massotti, actress

=== May ===
- May 4 – Fernandinho, footballer
- May 10 – David Miranda, journalist and politician (d. 2023)
- May 29 – Hernanes, footballer

=== June ===
- June 4 – Ana Carolina Reston, fashion model (d. 2006)

=== July ===
- July 9 – Cris Cyborg, mixed martial artist

=== August ===
- August 9 – Filipe Luis, footballer

== Deaths ==
=== January ===
- January 8 – Aracy Cortes, singer (b. 1904)
- January 12 – Vilanova Artigas, architect (b. 1915)

=== April ===
- April 21 – Tancredo Neves, politician (b. 1910)

=== October ===
- October 9 – Emílio Garrastazu Médici, 28th President of Brazil (b. 1905)

== See also ==
- 1985 in Brazilian football
- 1985 in Brazilian television
- List of Brazilian films of 1985
