= 1987 in Brazil =

Events in the year 1987 in Brazil:

== Incumbents ==
=== Federal government ===
- President: José Sarney
- Vice President: Vacant

=== Governors ===
- Acre:
  - Iolanda Fleming (until 15 March)
  - Flaviano Melo (from 15 March)
- Alagoas:
  - José de Medeiros Tavares (until 15 March)
  - Fernando Collor de Mello (from 15 March)
- Amazonas:
  - Gilberto Mestrinho (until 15 March)
  - Amazonino Mendes (from 15 March)
- Bahia:
  - João Durval Carneiro (until 15 March)
  - Waldir Pires (from 15 March)
- Ceará:
  - Gonzaga Mota (until 15 March)
  - Tasso Jereissati (from 15 March)
- Espírito Santo:
  - José Moraes (until 15 March)
  - Max Freitas Mauro (from 15 March)
- Goiás:
  - Onofre Quinan (until 15 March)
  - Henrique Santillo (from 15 March)
- Maranhão:
  - Luís Rocha (until 15 March)
  - Epitácio Cafeteira (from 15 March)
- Mato Grosso:
  - Wilmar Peres de Faria (until 15 March)
  - Carlos Bezerra (from 15 March)
- Mato Grosso do Sul:
  - Ramez Tebet (until 15 March)
  - Marcelo Miranda Soares (from 15 March)
- Minas Gerais:
  - Hélio Garcia (until 15 March)
  - Newton Cardoso (from 15 March)
- Pará:
  - Jader Barbalho (until 15 March)
  - Hélio Gueiros (from 15 March)
- Paraíba:
  - Milton Bezerra Cabral (until 15 March)
  - Tarcísio Burity (from 15 March)
- Paraná:
  - João Elísio Ferraz de Campos (until 15 March)
  - Alvaro Dias (from 15 March)
- Pernambuco:
  - Gustavo Krause (until 15 March)
  - Miguel Arraes (from 15 March)
- Piauí:
  - Bona Medeiros (until 15 March)
  - Alberto Silva (from 15 March)
- Rio de Janeiro:
  - Leonel Brizola then Moreira Franco
- Rio Grande do Norte:
  - Radir Pereira de Araujo (until 15 March)
  - Geraldo José Ferreira de Melo (from 15 March)
- Rio Grande do Sul:
  - Jair de Oliveira Soares (until 15 March)
  - Pedro Simon (from 15 March)
- Rondônia:
  - Ângelo Angelin (until 15 March)
  - Jerônimo Garcia de Santana (from 15 March)
- Santa Catarina:
  - Esperidião Amin (until 15 March)
  - Pedro Ivo Campos (from 15 March)
- São Paulo:
  - André Franco Montoro (until 15 March)
  - Orestes Quércia (from 15 March)
- Sergipe:
  - João Alves Filho (until 15 March)
  - Antônio Carlos Valadares (from 15 March)

=== Vice governors ===
- Acre: Edison Simão Cadaxo (from 15 March)
- Alagoas: Moacir Andrade (from 15 March)
- Amazonas: Vivaldo Barros Frota (from 15 March)
- Bahia:
  - Edvaldo de Oliveira Flores (until 15 March)
  - Nilo Moraes Coelho (from 15 March)
- Ceará:
  - José Adauto Bezerra (until 15 March)
  - Francisco Castelo de Castro (from 15 March)
- Espírito Santo:
  - José Moraes (until 15 March)
  - Carlos Alberto Batista da Cunha (from 15 March)
- Goiás: Joaquim Domingos Roriz (from 15 March)
- Maranhão:
  - João Rodolfo Ribeiro Gonçalves (until 15 March)
  - João Alberto Souza (from 15 March)
- Mato Grosso: Edison de Oliveira (from 15 March)
- Mato Grosso do Sul:
  - Vacant (until 15 March)
  - George Takimoto (from 15 March)
- Minas Gerais: Júnia Marise de Azeredo Coutinho (from 15 March)
- Pará:
  - Laércio Dias Franco (until 15 March)
  - Hermínio Calvinho Filho (from 15 March)
- Paraíba:
  - Antônio da Costa Gomes (until 15 March)
  - Vacant (from 15 March)
- Paraná: Ary Veloso Queiroz (from 15 March)
- Pernambuco: Carlos Wilson Rocha de Queirós Campos (from 15 March)
- Piauí: Lucídio Portela Nunes (from 15 March)
- Rio de Janeiro:
  - Darcy Ribeiro (until 15 March)
  - Francisco Amaral (from 15 March)
- Rio Grande do Norte:
  - Vacant (until 15 March)
  - Garibaldi Alves (from 15 March)
- Rio Grande do Sul:
  - Cláudio Ênio Strassburger (until 15 March)
  - Sinval Sebastião Duarte Guazzelli (from 15 March)
- Rondônia: Orestes Muniz Filho (from 15 March)
- Santa Catarina:
  - Victor Fontana (until 15 March)
  - Casildo João Maldaner (from 15 March)
- São Paulo:
  - Vacant (until 15 March)
  - Almino Afonso (from 15 March)
- Sergipe:
  - Antônio Carlos Valadares (until 15 March)
  - Benedito de Figueiredo (from 15 March)

== Events ==
=== February ===
- 1 February: The National Constituent Assembly is installed by the President of the Supreme Federal Court, José Carlos Moreira Alves.
- 25 February: The Central Bank of Brazil decides to intervene in banks in the states of Maranhão, Ceará, Mato Grosso, Rio de Janeiro and Santa Catarina.

=== June ===
- 12 June: President José Sarney announces the launch of the Bresser Plan, which freezes rents and wages.

=== July ===
- July 26: Around 70 people are killed, after a crash between two tourist buses and a Voyage car on BR-040, which connects Rio de Janeiro to Belo Horizonte in Nova Lima, Minas Gerais.

=== August ===
- 1 August: Luiz Inácio Lula da Silva is chosen as a candidate for the presidency of the Republic by the Workers' Party.

=== September ===
- 13 September: A radioactive object is stolen from an abandoned hospital in Goiânia, Brazil, contaminating many people in the following weeks and causing some to die from radiation poisoning.

=== December ===
- 7 December: Brasília is declared a World Heritage Site by UNESCO.

== Births ==
=== January ===
- January 10: César Cielo, swimmer
- January 15: Jesus Luz, model and DJ

=== March ===
- March 5: Lua Blanco, actress (d. 2026)
- March 19: Thiago Garrocho, politician
- March 20: Jô, footballer

=== April ===
- April 5: Rodolpho Toski, football referee
- April 22: David Luiz, footballer

=== June ===
- June 6: Cássio, footballer
- June 25: Hugo Bonemer, actor

=== July ===
- July 7: Alex Pereira, mixed martial artist
- July 13: Wellington Menezes de Oliveira, mass murderer (d. 2011)
- July 23: Luiz Gustavo, footballer

=== October ===
- October 11: Andressa Urach, model & reality television star

=== December ===
- December 13: Weverton, footballer
- December 18: Deiveson Figueiredo, mixed martial artist
- December 31: Maiara & Maraisa, musical duo

== Deaths ==
=== February ===
- February 2: Carlos Castilho, footballer (b. 1927)

=== August ===
- August 17: Carlos Drummond de Andrade, poet and writer (b. 1902)

=== September ===
- September 18: Golbery do Couto e Silva, general and politician (b. 1911)

=== December ===
- December 22: José do Patrocínio Oliveira, musician and voice actor (b. 1904)

== See also ==
- 1987 in Brazilian football
- 1987 in Brazilian television
