= 1975 in Brazil =

Events in the year 1975 in Brazil.

== Incumbents ==
=== Federal government ===
- President: General Ernesto Geisel
- Vice President: General Adalberto Pereira dos Santos

=== Governors ===
- Acre: Vacant
- Alagoas:
  - Afrânio Lages (until 15 March)
  - Divaldo Suruagy (from 15 March)
- Amazonas:
  - João Walter de Andrade (until 15 March)
  - Henoch da Silva Reis (from 15 March)
- Bahia:
  - Antônio Carlos Magalhães (until 15 March)
  - Roberto Santos (from 15 March)
- Ceará:
  - César Cals (until 15 March)
  - José Adauto Bezerra (from 15 March)
- Espírito Santo:
  - Artur Carlos Gerhardt Santos (until 15 March)
  - Élcio Álvares (from 15 March)
- Goiás:
  - Leonino Caiado (until 15 March)
  - Irapuan Costa Jr. (from 15 March)
- Guanabara: Antonio de Pádua Chagas Freitas (until 15 March)
- Maranhão:
  - Pedro Neiva de Santana (until 15 March)
  - Oswaldo da Costa Nunes Freire (from 31 March)
- Mato Grosso:
  - José Fragelli (until 15 March)
  - Jose Garcia Neto (from 15 March)
- Minas Gerais:
  - Rondon Pacheco (until 15 March)
  - Aureliano Chaves (from 15 March)
- Pará:
  - Fernando Guilhon (until 15 March)
  - Aloysio Chaves (from 15 March)
- Paraíba:
  - Ernâni Sátiro (until 15 March)
  - Ivan Bichara (from 15 March)
- Paraná:
  - Emílio Hoffmann Gomes (until 15 March)
  - Jaime Canet Júnior (from 15 March)
- Pernambuco:
  - Eraldo Gueiros (until 15 March)
  - Francisco Moura Cavalcanti (from 15 March)
- Piauí:
  - Alberto Silva (until 15 March)
  - Dirceu Arcoverde (from 15 March)
- Rio de Janeiro: Floriano P. Faria Lima
- Rio Grande do Norte:
  - Jose Pereira de Araújo Cortez (until 15 March)
  - Tarcisio de Vasconcelos Maia (from 15 March)
- Rio Grande do Sul:
  - Euclides Triches (until 15 March)
  - Sinval Sebastião Duarte Guazzelli (from 15 March)
- Santa Catarina:
  - Colombo Salles (until 15 March)
  - Antônio Carlos Konder Reis (from 15 March)
- São Paulo:
  - Laudo Natel (until 15 March)
  - Paulo Egídio Martins (from 15 March)
- Sergipe:
  - Paulo Barreto de Menezes (until 15 March)
  - José Rollemberg (from 15 March)

=== Vice governors ===
- Acre:
  - Alberto Barbosa da Costa (until 15 March)
  - Omar Sabino de Paula (from 15 March)
- Alagoas:
  - José de Medeiros Tavares (until 15 March)
  - Antônio Gomes de Barro (from 15 March)
- Amazonas:
  - Deoclides de Carvalho Leal (until 15 March)
  - João Bosco Ramos de Lima (from 15 March)
- Bahia:
  - Menandro Minahim (until 15 March)
  - Edvaldo Brandão Correia (from 15 March)
- Ceará:
  - Francisco Humberto Bezerra (until 15 March)
  - José Waldemar de Alcântara e Silva (from 15 March)
- Espírito Santo:
  - Henrique Pretti (until 15 March)
  - Carlos Alberto Lindenberg von Schilgen (from 15 March)
- Goiás:
  - Ursulino Tavares Leão (until 15 March)
  - José Luís Bittencourt (from 15 March)
- Maranhão:
  - Alexandre Sá Colares Moreira (until 15 March)
  - José Duailibe Murad (from 15 March)
- Mato Grosso:
  - José Monteiro de Figueiredo (until 15 March)
  - Cássio Leite de Barros (from 15 March)
- Minas Gerais:
  - Celso Porfírio de Araújo Machado (until 15 March)
  - Levindo Ozanam Coelho (from 15 March)
- Pará:
  - Newton Burlamaqui Barreira (until 15 March)
  - Clovis Silva de Morais Rego (from 15 March)
- Paraíba:
  - Clóvis Bezerra Cavalcanti (until 15 March)
  - Dorgival Terceiro Neto (from 15 March)
- Paraná:
  - Jaime Canet Júnior (until 15 March)
  - Octávio Cesário Pereira Júnior (from 15 March)
- Pernambuco:
  - José Antônio Barreto Guimarães (until 15 March)
  - Paulo Gustavo de Araújo Cunha (from 15 March)
- Piauí:
  - Sebastião Rocha Leal (until 15 March)
  - Djalma Martins Veloso (from 15 March)
- Rio Grande do Norte:
  - Tertius Rebelo (until 15 March)
  - Geraldo Melo (from 15 March)
- Rio de Janeiro:
  - Teotônio Araújo (until 15 March)
  - Vacant thereafter (from 15 March)
- Rio Grande do Sul:
  - Edmar Fetter (until 15 March)
  - José Augusto Amaral de Sousa (from 15 March)
- Santa Catarina:
  - Atílio Francisco Xavier Fontana (until 15 March)
  - Marcos Henrique Büechler(from 15 March)
- São Paulo:
  - Antonio José Rodrigues Filho (until 15 March)
  - Ferreira Filho (from 15 March)
- Sergipe:
  - Adalberto Moura (until 15 March)
  - Antônio Ribeiro Sotelo (from 15 March)

== Events ==
=== March ===
- March 15: The state of Guanabara merges into the state of Rio de Janeiro, in accordance to a complementary law approved the previous year.

=== June ===
- June 4–7: Romanian President Nicolae Ceauşescu arrives in Brasília for a four-day visit to Brazil and a meeting with President Ernesto Geisel at the Planalto Palace.
- June 27: Brazil signs a nuclear agreement with the Federal Republic of Germany, in Bonn.

=== August ===
- August 15: Embraer exports its first aircraft to Uruguay.

=== October ===
- October 25: The director of journalism at TV Cultura, Vladimir Herzog, is found dead in a simulated suicide on the premises of DOI-CODI in São Paulo.

== Births ==
=== January ===
- 6 January: Ricardo Santos, beach volleyball player
- 30 January: Juninho Pernambucano, footballer

=== April ===
- 14 April: Anderson Silva, mixed martial artist

=== May ===
- 8 May:
- 10 May: Hélio Castroneves, racing driver

=== July ===
- 14 July: Derlei, footballer
- 16 July: Ana Paula Arósio, actress and model

=== August ===
- 22 August: Rodrigo Santoro, actor

=== September ===
- 7 September: Renato Sobral, martial artist
- 21 September: Acelino Freitas, boxer and politician

=== November ===
- 14 November: Luizão, footballer

== Deaths ==
=== April ===
- April 21: Ranieri Mazzilli, 23rd and 25th President of Brazil (born 1910)

=== November ===
- November 28: Érico Veríssimo, writer (born 1905)

== See also ==
- 1975 in Brazilian football
- 1975 in Brazilian television
