= 2009 in Brazil =

Events in the year 2009 in Brazil.

== Incumbents ==
=== Federal government ===
- President: Luiz Inácio Lula da Silva
- Vice President: José Alencar Gomes da Silva

=== Governors ===
- Acre: Binho Marques
- Alagoas: Teotônio Vilela Filho
- Amapa: Waldez Góes
- Amazonas: Eduardo Braga
- Bahia: Jaques Wagner
- Ceará: Cid Gomes
- Espírito Santo: Paulo Hartung
- Goiás: Alcides Rodrigues
- Maranhão:
  - Jackson Lago (until 17 April)
  - Roseana Sarney (from 17 April)
- Mato Grosso: Blairo Maggi
- Mato Grosso do Sul: André Puccinelli
- Minas Gerais: Aécio Neves
- Pará: Ana Júlia Carepa
- Paraíba:
  - Cássio Cunha Lima (until 18 February)
  - José Maranhão (from 18 February)
- Paraná: Roberto Requião de Mello e Silva
- Pernambuco: Eduardo Campos
- Piauí: Wellington Dias
- Rio de Janeiro: Sérgio Cabral Filho
- Rio Grande do Norte: Wilma Maria de Faria
- Rio Grande do Sul: Yeda Rorato Crusius
- Rondônia: Ivo Narciso Cassol
- Roraima: José de Anchieta Júnior
- Santa Catarina: Luiz Henrique da Silveira
- São Paulo: José Serra
- Sergipe: Marcelo Déda
- Tocantins:
  - Marcelo Miranda (until 9 September)
  - Carlos Henrique Gaguim (from 9 September)

=== Vice governors ===
- Acre: Carlos César Correia de Messias
- Alagoas: José Wanderley Neto
- Amapá: Pedro Paulo Dias de Carvalho
- Amazonas: Omar José Abdel Aziz
- Bahia: Edmundo Pereira Santos
- Ceará: Francisco José Pinheiro
- Espírito Santo: Ricardo de Rezende Ferraço
- Goiás: Ademir de Oliveira Meneses
- Maranhão:
  - Luís Carlos Porto (until 17 April)
  - João Alberto Souza (from 17 April)
- Mato Grosso: Silval da Cunha Barbosa
- Mato Grosso do Sul: Murilo Zauith
- Minas Gerais: Antonio Augusto Junho Anastasia
- Pará: Odair Santos Corrêa
- Paraíba:
  - José Lacerda Neto (until 18 February)
  - Luciano Cartaxo Pires de Sá (from 18 February)
- Paraná: Orlando Pessuti
- Pernambuco: João Soares Lyra Neto
- Piauí: Wilson Martins
- Rio de Janeiro: Luiz Fernando Pezão
- Rio Grande do Norte: Iberê Ferreira
- Rio Grande do Sul: Paulo Afonso Girardi Feijó
- Rondônia: João Aparecido Cahulla
- Roraima: Vacant
- Santa Catarina: Leonel Pavan
- São Paulo: Alberto Goldman
- Sergipe: Belivaldo Chagas Silva
- Tocantins:
  - Eduardo Machado Silva (until 26 September)
  - Vacant (26 September-8 October)
  - Paulo Sidnei Antunes (from 8 October)

== Events ==
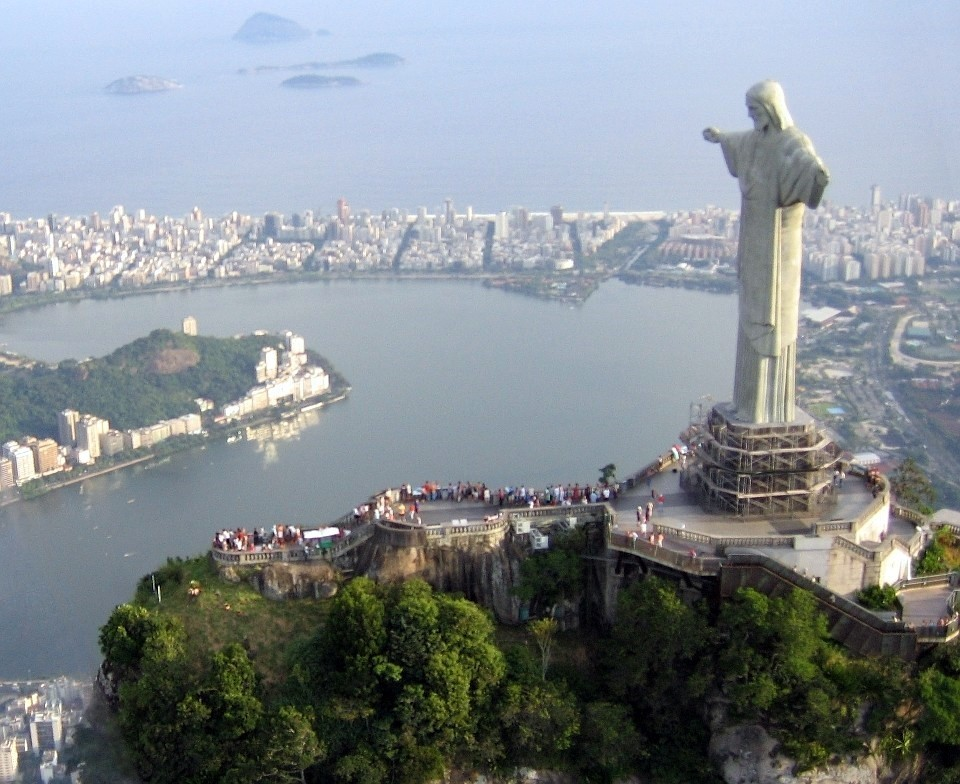
View of the Christ the Redeemer statue from a helicopter

States fully (dark red) and partially (light red) affected by the blackout.

=== February ===
- February 2: José Sarney is elected president of the Federal Senate by 49 votes against 32 for Senator Tião Viana (PT).

=== March ===
- March 4: Fernando Collor de Mello is elected chairman of the Senate Infrastructure Committee.
- March 26: Eliana Tranchesi, who owns the luxury store Daslu, is arrested by Federal Police in São Paulo, after allegations of committing fraud. However, she is released the next day.

=== April ===
- April 7: São Paulo's anti-smoking bill is approved by 69 in favor and 18 against by the Legislative Assembly of São Paulo. This would prohibit the use of cigarettes and other smoking products in closed environments for collective use or near people with respiratory or pulmonary problems.

=== May ===
- May 7: São Paulo's anti-smoking bill is signed into law by São Paulo governor José Serra.
- May 8: Health Minister José Gomes Temporão confirms the country's first case of the swine flu pandemic.
- May 12: The three stolen paintings of Cândido Portinari, Tarsila do Amaral, and Orlando Teruz are found abandoned in the West Zone of São Paulo.

=== June ===
- June 28:
  - Brazil defeats the United States 3-2, to win the 2009 FIFA Confederations Cup. This is Brazil's third FIFA Confederations Cup trophy.
  - The Ministry of Health confirms the first death caused by the swine flu pandemic.

=== October ===
- October 2: The 121st IOC Session in Copenhagen, Denmark selects Rio de Janeiro as the host city for the 2016 Summer Olympics.

=== November ===
- November 11: Brazil, along with Paraguay, suffers from a large power blackout at night, affecting several million people.

== Deaths ==
=== June ===
- June 17: Perry Salles, film director and actor (b. 1939)

=== July ===
- July 19: Gilberto Mestrinho, Governor of Amazonas (1959–1963, 1983–1987, 1991–1995) (b. 1928)
- July 24: Zé Carlos, footballer (b. 1962)

=== October ===
- October 31: Neguinho do Samba, percussionist and founder of Olodum (b. 1955)

=== November ===
- November 20: Herbert Richers, film and dubbing producer (b. 1923)

=== December ===
- December 2: Luiz Lombardi Neto, television announcer and voice actor (b. 1940)
