= 1990 in Brazil =

Events in the year 1990 in Brazil.

== Incumbents ==
=== Federal government ===
- President:
  - José Sarney (until March 14)
  - Fernando Collor de Mello (starting March 15)
- Vice President:
  - Vacant (until March 14)
  - Itamar Franco (starting March 15)

=== Governors ===
- Acre: Édison Simão Cadaxo
- Alagoas: Moacir Andrade
- Amazonas:
  - Amazonino Mendes (until April 2)
  - Vivaldo Barroso Frota (from April 2)
- Bahia: Nilo Moraes Coelho
- Ceará: Tasso Jereissati
- Espírito Santo: Max Freitas Mauro
- Goiás: Henrique Santillo
- Maranhão:
  - Epitácio Cafeteira (until April 3)
  - João Alberto de Souza (from April 3)
- Mato Grosso: Edison de Oliveira
- Mato Grosso do Sul: Marcelo Miranda Soares
- Minas Gerais: Newton Cardoso
- Pará: Hélio Gueiros
- Paraíba: Tarcísio Burity
- Paraná: Alvaro Dias
- Pernambuco: Joaquim Francisco Cavalcanti
- Piauí: Alberto Silva
- Rio de Janeiro: Moreira Franco
- Rio Grande do Norte: Geraldo José Ferreira de Melo
- Rio Grande do Sul:
  - Pedro Simon (until April 2)
  - Sinval Sebastião Duarte Guazzelli (from April 2)
- Rondônia: Jerônimo Garcia de Santana
- Roraima: Rubens Vilar
- Santa Catarina:
  - Pedro Ivo Campos (until February 27)
  - Casildo Maldaner (from February 27)
- São Paulo: Orestes Quércia
- Sergipe: Antônio Carlos Valadares
- Tocantins: José Wilson Siqueira Campos

=== Vice governors ===
- Acre:
  - Edison Simão Cadaxo (until April 2)
  - Vacant thereafter (from April 2)
- Alagoas: vacant
- Amazonas:
  - Vivaldo Barros Frota (until April 2)
  - Vacant thereafter (from April 2)
- Bahia: Vacant
- Ceará: Francisco Castelo de Castro
- Espírito Santo: Carlos Alberto Batista da Cunha
- Goiás: Joaquim Domingos Roriz
- Maranhão:
  - João Alberto Souza (until April 2)
  - Vacant thereafter (from April 2)
- Mato Grosso:
  - Edison de Oliveira (until April 2)
  - Vacant thereafter (from April 2)
- Mato Grosso do Sul: George Takimoto
- Minas Gerais: Júnia Marise de Azeredo Coutinho
- Pará: Hermínio Calvinho Filho
- Paraíba: Vacant
- Paraná: Ary Veloso Queiroz
- Pernambuco:
  - Carlos Wilson Rocha de Queirós Campos (until April 2)
  - Vacant thereafter (from April 2)
- Piauí: Lucídio Portela Nunes
- Rio de Janeiro: Francisco Amaral
- Rio Grande do Norte: Garibaldi Alves
- Rio Grande do Sul:
  - Sinval Sebastião Duarte Guazzelli (until 2 April)
  - Vacant thereafter (from April 2)
- Rondônia: Orestes Muniz Filho
- Santa Catarina:
  - Casildo João Maldaner (until April 2)
  - Vacant thereafter (from April 2)
- São Paulo:
  - Almino Afonso (until April 2)
  - Vacant thereafter (from April 2)
- Sergipe: Benedito de Figueiredo
- Tocantins: Darci Martins Coelho

== Events ==
=== March ===
- March 15: Fernando Collor de Mello is sworn in as the 32nd President of Brazil and becomes the youngest president in Brazilian history.

=== April ===
- April 3: The National Congress of Brazil approves the first measures of the Collor Plan.

=== July ===
- July 25: President Collor de Mello signs the Heinous Crimes Law, which increases the penalties for kidnapping, trafficking, rape, and other crimes.
- July 26: Eleven people, who were residents of the Acari favela, are kidnapped by six armed men in the so-called Acari Massacre.

=== November ===
- November 30: The country's first cell phone system is inaugurated by the Minister of Infrastructure, Ozires Silva, in the South Zone of Rio de Janeiro.

=== December ===
- December 16: Darcy Alves Pereira and Darly Alves da Silva are sentenced to 19 years in prison for the murder of rubber tapper Chico Mendes.

== Births ==
=== March ===
- March 17 – Santos, footballer

=== April ===
- April 16 – Alexandre Pantoja, mixed martial artist

=== July ===
- July 3 – Lucas Mendes, footballer

=== September ===
- September 14 – Douglas Costa, footballer

== Deaths ==
=== January ===
- January 24 – Araken Patusca, footballer (b. 1905)

=== March ===
- March 7 – Luís Carlos Prestes, politician (b. 1898)

=== May ===
- May 7 – Elizete Cardoso, singer and actress (b. 1920)

=== July ===
- July 7 – Cazuza, singer and songwriter, (b. 1958)

== See also ==
- 1990 in Brazilian football
- 1990 in Brazilian television
