= 1905 in Brazil =

Events in the year 1905 in Brazil.

== Incumbents ==
=== Federal government ===
- President: Rodrigues Alves
- Vice President: Afonso Pena

=== Governors ===
- Alagoas: Antônio Máximo da Cunha Rego (till 1 November), Antônio Máximo da Cunha Rego (from 1 November)
- Amazonas: Antônio Constantino Néri
- Bahia: José Marcelino de Sousa
- Ceará: Antônio Nogueira Accioli
- Goiás:
  - until July 14: José Xavier de Almeida
  - from July 14: Miguel da Rocha Lima
- Maranhão: Manuel Lopes da Cunha
- Mato Grosso: Antônio Pais de Barros
- Minas Gerais: Francisco Salles
- Pará: Augusto Montenegro
- Paraíba:
  - until 28 October: Álvaro Lopes Machado
  - from 28 October: Valfredo Leal
- Paraná: Vicente Machado da Silva Lima
- Pernambuco: Sigismundo Antônio Gonçalves
- Piauí: Álvaro de Assis Osório Mendes
- Rio Grande do Norte: Augusto Tavares Lira
- Rio Grande do Sul: Antônio Augusto Borges de Medeiros
- Santa Catarina:
- São Paulo:
- Sergipe:

=== Vice governors ===
- Rio Grande do Norte:
- São Paulo:

== Events ==
- 5 February - The football club Clube do Remo is established in Belém.
- 30 December - Law no. 1452 is passed by the National Congress of Brazil, authorizing expenditure of £4,214,550 for new warship construction (£1,685,820 in 1906).

== Arts and culture ==
=== Books ===
- Lima Barreto - O Subterrâneo do Morro do Castelo

== Births ==
- 8 February - Preguinho, footballer (died 1979)
- 15 February - Waldemar Henrique, pianist and composer (died 1995)
- 11 May - Augusto Hamann Rademaker Grünewald, admiral (died 1985)
- 17 July - Araken Patusca, footballer (died 1990)
- 10 August - Evandro Chagas, physician and biomedical scientist (died 1940)
- 17 December - Erico Verissimo, writer (died 1975)

== Deaths ==
- 29 January - José do Patrocínio, writer, journalist, activist, orator and pharmacist (born 1854; suffered hemoptysis just after making a speech in honour of Alberto Santos-Dumont)
- 22 September - Suresh Biswas, Indian adventurer (born 1861;

== See also ==
- 1905 in Brazilian football
