= 1910 in Brazil =

Events in the year 1910 in Brazil.

== Incumbents ==
=== Federal government ===
- President: Nilo Peçanha (until 14 November); Marshal Hermes da Fonseca (from 15 November)
- Vice President: vacant (until 14 November); Venceslau Brás (from 15 November)

=== Governors ===
- Alagoas: Euclid Vieira Malta
- Amazonas: Antônio Clemente Ribeiro Bittencourt
- Bahia: João Ferreira de Araújo Pinho
- Ceará: Antônio Nogueira Accioli
- Goiás: Urbano Coelho de Gouveia
- Maranhão:
  - till 5 February: Américo Vespúcio dos Reis
  - 5 February - 1 March: Frederico de Sá Filgueiras
  - from 1 March: Luís Antônio Domingues da Silva
- Mato Grosso: Pedro Celestino Corrêa da Costa
- Minas Gerais:
  - till 7 September: Venceslau Brás
  - from 7 September: Júlio Bueno Brandão
- Pará: João Antônio Luís Coelho
- Paraíba: João Lopes Machado
- Paraná: Francisco Xavier da Silva
- Pernambuco: Herculano Bandeira de Melo
- Piauí:
  - till 15 March: Manuel Raimundo da Paz
  - from 15 March: Antonino Freire da Silva
- Rio Grande do Norte: Alberto Maranhão
- Rio Grande do Sul: Carlos Barbosa Gonçalves
- Santa Catarina:
- São Paulo:
- Sergipe:

=== Vice governors ===
- Rio Grande do Norte:
- São Paulo:

== Events ==
- 1 March - In the presidential election, Hermes da Fonseca receives 57.1% of the vote. Fonseca is supported by several of the most influential Republican parties, while his main opponent, Rui Barbosa, is supported by the Civilist Campaign.
- 7 May - João do Rio is elected to chair # 26 of the Brazilian Academy of Letters.
- October - The Conservative Republican Party is founded, in support of new president Hermes da Fonseca.
- 22 November - Revolt of the Lash: The mostly black crews of four Brazilian warships, led by João Cândido, mutiny shortly after a sailor receives 250 lashes. The crews depose their white officers and threaten to bombard Rio de Janeiro.

== Births ==
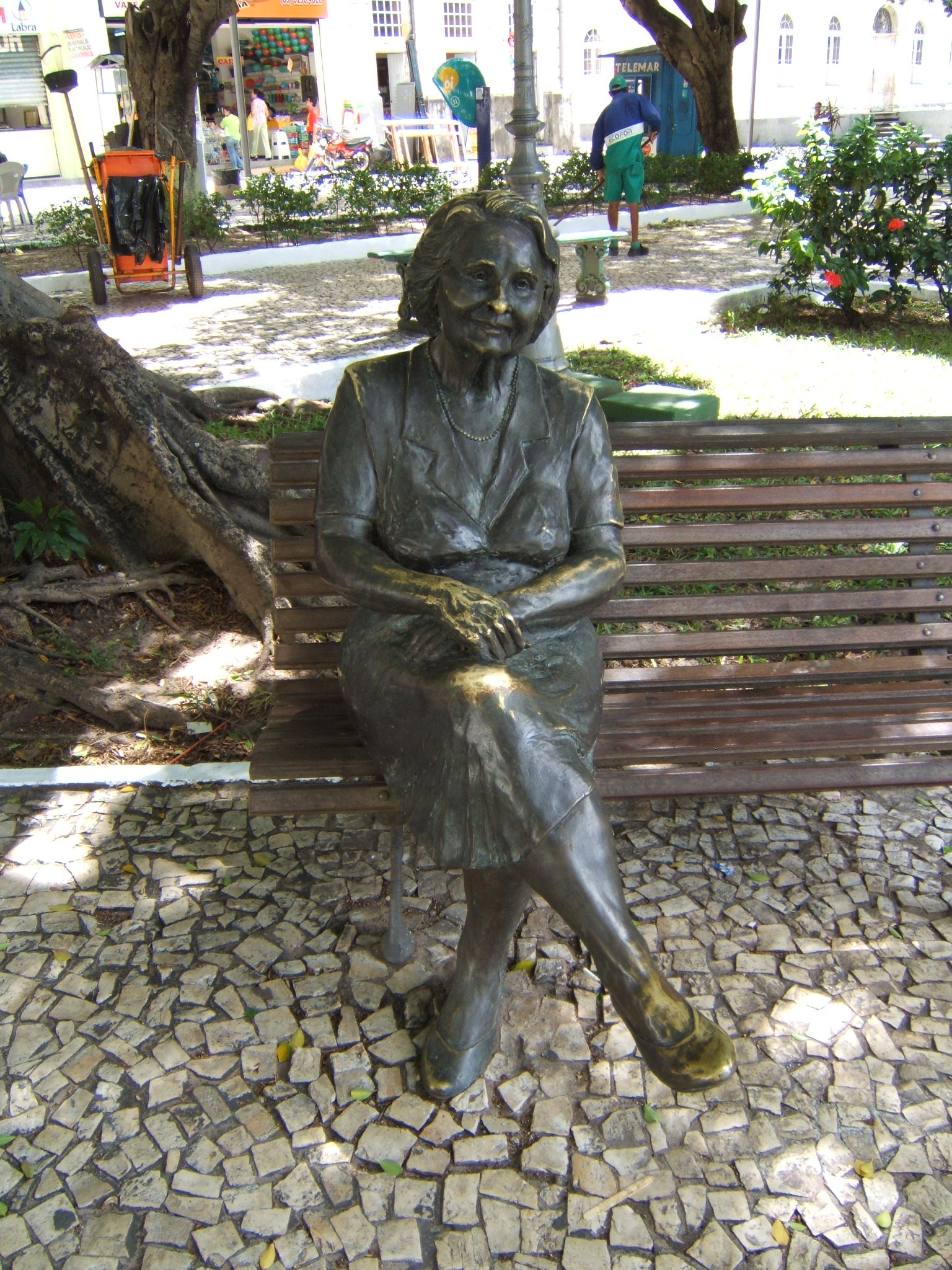
statue of Rachel de Queiroz

- 18 February - Lycia de Biase Bidart, musician (died 1990)
- 4 March - Tancredo de Almeida Neves, politician (died 1985)
- 19 June - Pagu, political, literary and artistic activist (died 1962)
- 17 November - Rachel de Queiroz, journalist and novelist (died 2003)
- 11 December - Noel Rosa, singer and songwriter (died 1937)
- 15 December - Rodolfo Arena, actor (died 1980)

== Deaths ==
- 17 January - Joaquim Nabuco, abolitionist statesman and writer (born 1849)

== See also ==
- 1910 in Brazilian football
