= 1929 in Brazil =

Events in the year 1929 in Brazil.

== Incumbents ==
=== Federal government ===
- President: Washington Luís
- Vice President: Fernando de Melo Viana

=== Governors ===
- Alagoas: Álvaro Correia Pais
- Amazonas: Ifigênio Ferreira de Sales
- Bahia: Vital Soares
- Ceará: José Carlos de Matos Peixoto
- Goiás:
  - till 13 July: Brasil Caiado
  - 13-14 July: Joaquim Rufino Ramos Jubé
  - from 14 July: Alfredo Lopes de Morais
- Maranhão: José Magalhães de Almeida
- Mato Grosso: Mário Correia da Costa
- Minas Gerais: Antônio Carlos Ribeiro de Andrada
- Pará:
  - till 1 February: Dionísio Bentes
  - from 1 February: Eurico de Freitas Vale
- Paraíba: João Pessoa Cavalcanti
- Paraná: Afonso Camargo
- Pernambuco: Estácio Coimbra
- Piauí: João de Deus Pires Leal
- Rio Grande do Norte: Juvenal Lamartine de Faria
- Rio Grande do Sul: Getúlio Dornelles Vargas
- Santa Catarina:
- São Paulo:
- Sergipe:

=== Vice governors ===
- Rio Grande do Norte:
- São Paulo:

== Events ==
- August - Minas Gerais, Rio Grande do Sul, and Paraíba join the political opposition from several states, including the Democratic Party of São Paulo, to oppose the presidential candidacy of Washington Luís's nominated successor, Júlio Prestes, and form the Liberal Alliance.
- 20 September - The Liberal Alliance nominates its candidates for the presidential elections: Getúlio Vargas as President and João Pessoa Cavalcanti de Albuquerque as Vice President.
- 29 October - The US stock market crash causes a fall in coffee quotations to 60%.

== Arts and culture ==
=== Books ===
- Graça Aranha - A Viagem Maravilhosa

=== Films ===
- Sangue Mineiro, directed by Humberto Mauro

== Births ==
- 3 January - Ernst Mahle, conductor and composer
- 13 January - Aureliano Chaves, politician (died 2003)
- 8 March - Hebe Camargo, television host (died 2012)
- 17 April - Odete Lara, actress (died 2015)
- 4 May - Ronald Golias, comedian (died 2005)
- 28 June - Itamar Franco, 33rd President of Brazil (died 2011)
- 16 October - Fernanda Montenegro, actress
- 21 October - Walter Hugo Khouri, film director (died 2003)

== Deaths ==
- 25 November - Emilie Snethlage, German-born Brazilian naturalist and ornithologist who worked on the bird fauna of the Amazon (born 1868)
- 26 December - Pedro Weingärtner, painter (born 1853)

== See also ==
- 1929 in Brazilian football
