= 1975 in Brazilian television =

This is a list of Brazilian television related events from 1975.

== Events ==
- 14 April – The TV Globo telenovela Gabriela premieres, starring Sonia Braga in the lead role.
- May 17: TV Atalaia, the present-day affiliate of TV Record in Sergipe, is founded as an affiliate of Rede Tupi. It is the first station in the North and Northeast to broadcast in color.
- August 27: With thirty episodes already recorded, TV Globo's Roque Santeiro is forbidden from broadcasting. As a stop-gap measure the network airs a condensed version of Selva de Pedra, to be replaced later by a new telenovela, Pecado Capital.
- December 7: Grupo Bandeirantes buys TV Vila Rica (channel 7), paving the way for the conversion of Band to a national network.

== Debuts ==
- Gabriela (April 14-October 24, 1975)

== Television shows ==
=== 1970s ===
- Vila Sésamo (1972-1977, 2007–present)

== Networks and services ==
=== Launches ===
Network	Type	Launch date	Notes	Source
TV Amapá	Terrestrial	25 January		
TV Roraima	Terrestrial	29 January		
TV Brasil Central	Terrestrial	1 May		
TV Atalaia	Terrestrial	15 May		
TV Cultura de Maringá	Terrestrial	25 September		
TV Gazeta AL	Terrestrial	27 September		
TVE Brasil	Terrestrial	5 November		

=== Conversions and rebrandings ===
Old network name	New network name	Type	Conversion Date	Notes	Source

=== Closures ===
Network	Type	Closure date	Notes	Source

== Births ==
- 19 March - Alexandre Barillari, actor
- 25 March - Viviane Araújo, model & actress
- 5 April - Lisandra Souto, actress
- 16 April - Flávio Canto, British-born former judoka & TV host
- 3 June - Cacau Protásio, actress
- 18 August - Ricardo Tozzi, actor
- 30 October - Fabiana Karla, actress & comedian

== See also ==
- 1975 in Brazil
