= 1955 in Brazil =

Events in the year 1955 in Brazil.

== Incumbents ==
=== Federal government ===
- President:
  - Café Filho (until 8 November)
  - Carlos Luz (8 November-11 November)
  - Nereu Ramos (from 11 November)

=== Governors ===
- Alagoas: Arnon de Mello
- Amazonas:
  - Álvaro Botelho Maia (until 25 March)
  - Plínio Ramos Coelho (from 25 March)
- Bahia:
  - Régis Pacheco (until 7 April)
  - Antônio Balbino (from 7 April)
- Ceará:
  - Stênio Gomes da Silva (until 25 March)
  - Paulo Sarasate (from 25 March)
- Espírito Santo:
  - Francisco Alves Ataíde (until 31 January)
  - Francisco Lacerda de Aguiar (from 31 January)
- Goiás: José Ludovico de Almeida
- Maranhão:
- Mato Grosso: Fernando Corrêa da Costa
- Minas Gerais:
  - Juscelino Kubitschek (until 31 March)
  - Clóvis Salgado da Gama (from 31 March)
- Pará: Zacarias de Assumpção
- Paraíba: José Américo de Almeida
- Paraná:
  - Bento Munhoz da Rocha Neto (until 3 April)
  - Antonio Annibelli (3 April-1 May)
  - Adolfo de Oliveira Franco (from 1 May)
- Pernambuco:
  - Etelvino Lins de Albuquerque (until 31 January)
  - Osvaldo Cordeiro de Farias (from 31 January)
- Piauí:
  - Pedro Freitas (until 25 March)
  - Jacob Gaioso e Almendra (from 25 March)
- Rio de Janeiro:
  - Amaral Peixoto (until 31 January)
  - Miguel Couto Filho (from 31 January)
- Rio Grande do Norte: Silvio Piza Pedrosa
- Rio Grande do Sul:
  - Ernesto Dornelles (until 25 March)
  - Ildo Meneghetti (from 25 March)
- Santa Catarina: Irineu Bornhausen
- São Paulo:
  - Lucas Nogueira Garcez (until 31 January)
  - Jânio Quadros (from 31 January)
- Sergipe:
  - Arnaldo Rollemberg Garcez (until 31 January)
  - Leandro Maciel (from 31 January)

=== Vice governors ===
- Alagoas: Sizenando Nabuco de Melo
- Ceará: Wilson Gonçalves
- Espírito Santo:
  - Francisco Alves Ataíde (until 31 January)
  - Adwalter Ribeiro Soares (from 31 January)
- Goiás: Bernardo Sayão Carvalho Araújo
- Maranhão: Renato Bayma Archer da Silva
- Mato Grosso: João Leite de Barros
- Minas Gerais: Clóvis Salgado da Gama
- Paraíba: João Fernandes de Lima
- Piauí:
  - Tertuliano Milton Brandão (until 25 March)
  - Francisco Ferreira de Castro (from 25 March)
- Rio de Janeiro:
  - Tarcísio Miranda (until 31 January)
  - Roberto Silveira (from 31 January)
- Rio Grande do Norte: Vacant
- São Paulo:
  - Erlindo Salzano (until 31 January)
  - Porfírio da Paz (from 31 January)
- Sergipe:
  - Edelzio Vieira de Melo (until 31 January)
  - José Machado de Souza (from 31 January)

== Events ==
- date unknown
  - The Museum of Modern Art, Rio de Janeiro, is completed, a Modernist concrete museum building, designed by Affonso Eduardo Reidy, with gardens designed by Burle Marx.

=== January ===
- January 31: An earthquake with a 6.2 magnitude hits Porto dos Gaúchos, Mato Grosso; becoming the biggest earthquake in Brazil.

=== July ===
- July 25: President Café Filho signs the Electoral Law, which establishes the single ballot.
- July 25-August 4: Bishops from all over Latin America meet in Rio de Janeiro for the first Episcopal Conference of Latin America.

=== October ===
- October 3: Direct presidential elections are held, where Juscelino Kubitschek emerges victorious, after receiving 35.7% of the vote.

=== November ===
- November 3: President Café Filho is admitted to a hospital in Rio de Janeiro after suffering a heart attack.
- November 8: Café Filho is forced to leave the presidency of Brazil on health grounds. The President of the Chamber of Deputies, Carlos Luz, assumes the presidency.
- November 11: With the support of the First Army's commander, Odílio Denys, General Henrique Lott advances with military troops over Rio de Janeiro. Upon learning of the military advancement, Carlos Luz flees aboard the Cruiser Tamandaré, along with Carlos Lacerda and Colonel Mamede. Under pressure from the military occupation, the Brazilian Congress vote to impeach Carlos Luz, for having left Brazilian territory without authorization. Senate President Nereu Ramos, becomes the 20th President of Brazil on an interim basis.
- November 25: Interim President Nereu Ramos, with authorization from the National Congress, declares a state of emergency, until the elected candidates can take office.

== Culture and the arts ==
=== Books ===
- Osman Lins - 0 Visitante

=== Drama ===
- Ariano Suassuna - O Auto da Compadecida

== Births ==
=== January ===
- January 2: Edson Leal Pujol, army general

=== March ===
- March 16: Bruno Barreto, film director
- March 21: Jair Bolsonaro, 38th president of Brazil

=== June ===
- June 24: Betty Lago, actress (died 2015)

=== July ===
- July 17: Luiz Alberto Figueiredo, diplomat and politician

== Deaths ==
=== March ===
- March 23: Artur Bernardes, politician (born 1875)

== See also ==
- 1955 in Brazilian football
