= 1940 in Brazil =

Events in the year 1940 in Brazil.

== Incumbents ==
=== Federal government ===
- President: Getúlio Vargas

=== Governors ===
- Alagoas:
  - Osman Laurel (until 31 October)
  - José Maria Correia das Neves (from 31 October)
- Amazonas: Álvaro Botelho Maia
- Bahia: Landulfo Alves
- Ceará: Francisco de Meneses Pimentel
- Espírito Santo: João Punaro Bley
- Goiás: Pedro Ludovico Teixeira
- Maranhão:
- Mato Grosso: Júlio Strübing Müller
- Minas Gerais: Benedito Valadares Ribeiro
- Pará: José Carneiro da Gama Malcher
- Paraíba:
  - till 29 July: Argemiro de Figueiredo
  - 29 July-16 August: Antônio Galdino Guedes
  - starting 16 August: Rui Carneiro
- Paraná: Manuel Ribas
- Pernambuco: Agamenon Magalhães
- Piauí: Leônidas Melo
- Rio Grande do Norte: Rafael Fernandes Gurjão
- Rio Grande do Sul: Osvaldo Cordeiro de Farias
- Santa Catarina: Nereu Ramos
- São Paulo: Ademar de Barros
- Sergipe: Erônides de Carvalho

=== Vice governors ===
- Rio Grande do Norte: no vice governor
- São Paulo: no vice governor

== Events ==
- 27 April - The Estádio do Pacaembu is inaugurated, at a ceremony attended by President Getúlio Vargas.

=== May ===
- 1 May: President Getúlio Vargas signs a decree, establishing the country's minimum wage.
- 12 May - The Interlagos Circuit is inaugurated in São Paulo.
- 5 June - President Vargas approves broad military collaboration between Brazil and the United States.
- date unknown - The minority Baenan language becomes extinct.

== Arts and culture ==
=== Films ===
- Argila, directed by Humberto Mauro

== Births ==
- 22 February - Aracy Balabanian, actress (died 2023)
- 29 March - Astrud Gilberto, singer-songwriter (died 2023)
- 15 May - Oscar Castro-Neves, guitarist, arranger, and composer (died 2013)
- 19 May - Carlos Diegues, film director (died 2025)
- 23 June - Sérgio Reis, singer and actor
- 9 July - Jair da Costa, footballer (died 2025)
- 21 July - Marco Maciel, politician (died 2021)
- 23 September - Michel Temer, politician
- 23 October - Pelé, footballer (died 2022)
- 16 December - Adelaide Neri, teacher and politician.

== Deaths ==
- 29 January - Pedro de Alcântara, Prince of Grão-Pará, born second-in-line to the Imperial throne of Brazil (born 1875)
- 6 October - Adolfo Lutz, physician and epidemiologist (born 1855)
- 8 November - Evandro Chagas, physician and biomedical scientist (born 1905; air crash)
- date unknown - Manuel F. Araujo, actor (born 1880)

== See also ==
- 1940 in Brazilian football
- List of Brazilian films of 1940
