= 1904 in Brazil =

Events in the year 1904 in Brazil.

== Incumbents ==
=== Federal government ===
- President: Rodrigues Alves
- Vice President: Silviano Brandão

=== Governors ===
- Alagoas: Joaquim Paulo Vieira Malta
- Amazonas: Silvério José Néri (till 23 July); Antônio Constantino Néri (from 23 July)
- Bahia: Severino Vieira, then José Marcelino de Sousa
- Ceará: Pedro Augusto Borges (till 12 July); Antônio Nogueira Accioli (from 12 July)
- Goiás: José Xavier de Almeida
- Maranhão: Manuel Lopes da Cunha
- Mato Grosso: Antônio Pais de Barros
- Minas Gerais: Francisco Salles
- Pará: Augusto Montenegro
- Paraíba: José Peregrino de Araújo (till 22 October); Álvaro Lopes Machado (from 22 October)
- Paraná: Francisco Xavier da Silva; Vicente Machado da Silva Lima
- Pernambuco: Antônio Gonçalves Ferreira (till 7 April); Sigismundo Antônio Gonçalves (from 7 April)
- Piauí: Arlindo Francisco Nogueira (till 1 July); Álvaro de Assis Osório Mendes (from 1 July)
- Rio Grande do Norte: Alberto Maranhão (till 25 March); Augusto Tavares Lira (from 25 March)
- Rio Grande do Sul: Antônio Augusto Borges de Medeiros
- Santa Catarina:
- São Paulo:
- Sergipe:

=== Vice governors ===
- Rio Grande do Norte:
- São Paulo:

== Events ==
- 17 April - Bangu Atlético Clube is founded at the Fábrica Bangu in Rio de Janeiro.
- 10-16 November - Vaccine Revolt in Rio de Janeiro.
- 14 December - The National Congress of Brazil approves a large naval acquisition programme.
- date unknown
  - The Evangelical Lutheran Church of Brazil is founded in Rio Grande do Sul.
  - Ford begin selling cars in Brazil.

== Births ==
- 3 January - Carlos Nascimento, football manager (died 1979)
- 11 February - José do Patrocínio Oliveira, musician and voice actor (died 1987)
- 7 October - Carlota De Camargo Nascimento, sculptor and poet (died 1974)
- 29 October – Casimiro Montenegro Filho, army and air force officer (died 2000)
- 2 November - Armando Del Debbio, footballer (died 1984)
- 3 December - Roberto Marinho, publisher, businessman and TV and radio mogul (died 2003)

== Deaths ==
- 10 September - Aparicio Saravia, Uruguayan politician and military leader (born 1856), of wounds received in the Battle of Masoller.
- 20 October - Carolina Novais, wife of the writer Joaquim Maria Machado de Assis, after thirty-five years of “perfect married life”.

== See also ==
- 1904 in Brazilian football
