= 1937 in Brazil =

Events in the year 1937 in Brazil.

== Incumbents ==
=== Federal government ===
- President: Getúlio Vargas

=== Governors ===
- Alagoas: Osman Laurel
- Amazonas: Álvaro Botelho Maia
- Bahia: Juracy Magalhães then Antônio Fernandes Dantas
- Ceará: Francisco de Meneses Pimentel
- Espírito Santo: João Punaro Bley
- Goiás: Pedro Ludovico Teixeira
- Maranhão:
- Mato Grosso: Mário Correia da Costa then Manuel Ari da Silva Pires then Júlio Strübing Müller
- Minas Gerais: Benedito Valadares Ribeiro
- Pará: José Carneiro da Gama Malcher
- Paraíba: Argemiro de Figueiredo
- Paraná: Manuel Ribas
- Pernambuco:
  - till 10 November: Carlos de Lima Cavalcanti
  - 10 November-3 December: Amaro de Azambuja Vila Nova
  - from 3 December: Agamenon Magalhães
- Piauí: Leônidas Melo
- Rio Grande do Norte: Rafael Fernandes Gurjão
- Rio Grande do Sul: José Antônio Flores da Cunha (till 17 October); Manuel de Cerqueira Daltro Filho (from 17 October)
- Santa Catarina: Nereu Ramos
- São Paulo: Henrique Smith Baima (till 5 January); José Joaquim Cardoso de Melo Neto (from 5 January)
- Sergipe: Erônides de Carvalho

=== Vice governors ===
- Rio Grande do Norte: no vice governor
- São Paulo: no vice governor

== Events ==
- January 13 - The National Museum of Fine Arts in Rio de Janeiro is established.
- May 7 - One of the leaders of the communist revolution, Luis Carlos Prestes, is sentenced to 16 years and eight months in prison.
- June 10 - National Democratic Union, ahead of support for the candidacy of Armando Sales de Oliveira for president in the 1938 elections is created.
- June 14 - President Getúlio Vargas signed the decree establishing the Itatiaia National Park, the first national park in Brazil.
- August 13 - The National Union of Students is founded in Rio de Janeiro.
- November 10 - The fourth Brazilian Constitution is granted by President Vargas, starting the Estado Novo.
- December 2 - President Vargas signs the ordinance which extinguishes all political parties in the country.

== Arts and culture ==
=== Books ===
- Cyro dos Anjos - O Amauense Belmiro

== Births ==
- January 27 – João Antônio, journalist and short story writer (died 1996)
- June 4 – Hugo Carvana, actor (died 2014)
- June 11 – Reginaldo Faria, actor and film director
- June 17 – Clodovil Hernandes, fashion designer, television presenter and politician (died 2009)
- August 22 – Ary Toledo, Brazilian humorist, singer, lyricist and actor
- October 23 – Carlos Lamarca, military turned guerrilla leader (died 1971)

== Deaths ==
=== January ===
- January 5: Alberto de Oliveira, poet (born 1857)

=== May ===
- May 4: Noel Rosa, singer and songwriter (born 1910)

=== November ===
- November 9: Estácio Coimbra, lawyer and politician (born 1872)

== See also ==
1937 in Brazilian football

== Bibliography ==
- Helton Perillo Ferreira Leite. Planalto do Itatiaia. Publit, 2007. ISBN 85-7773-076-X. ISBN 978-85-7773-076-6.

== See also ==
- 1937 in Brazilian football
- List of Brazilian films of 1937
