= 2003 in Brazil =

Events in the year 2003 in Brazil.

== Incumbents ==
=== Federal government ===
- President: Luiz Inácio Lula da Silva
- Vice President: José Alencar Gomes da Silva

=== Governors ===
- Acre: Jorge Viana
- Alagoas: Ronaldo Lessa
- Amapa: Waldez Góes (from 1 January)
- Amazonas: Eduardo Braga (from 1 January)
- Bahia:
  - Otto Alencar (until 1 January)
  - Paulo Souto (from 1 January)
- Ceará:
  - Beni Veras (until 1 January)
  - Lúcio Alcântara (from 1 January)
- Espírito Santo:
  - José Ignácio Ferreira (until 1 January)
  - Paulo Hartung (from 1 January)
- Goiás: Marconi Perillo
- Maranhão: José Reinaldo Tavares
- Mato Grosso: Blairo Maggi (from 1 January)
- Mato Grosso do Sul: José Orcírio Miranda dos Santos
- Minas Gerais:
  - Itamar Franco (until 1 January)
  - Aécio Neves (from 1 January)
- Pará:
  - Almir Gabriel (until 1 January)
  - Simão Jatene (from 1 January)
- Paraíba: Cássio Cunha Lima (from 1 January)
- Paraná:
  - Jaime Lerner (until 1 January)
  - Roberto Requião de Mello e Silva (from 1 January)
- Pernambuco: Jarbas Vasconcelos
- Piauí:
  - Hugo Napoleão (until 1 January)
  - Wellington Dias (from 1 January)
- Rio de Janeiro:
  - Benedita da Silva (until 1 January)
  - Rosinha Garotinho (from 1 January)
- Rio Grande do Norte:
  - Fernando Antonio Chamber Freire (until 1 January)
  - Wilma Maria de Faria (from 1 January)
- Rio Grande do Sul:
  - Olívio Dutra (until 1 January)
  - Germano Rigotto (from 1 January)
- Rondônia: Ivo Narciso Cassol (from 1 January)
- Roraima: Francisco Flamarion Portela
- Santa Catarina:
  - Esperidião Amin (until 1 January)
  - Luiz Henrique da Silveira (from 1 January)
- São Paulo: Geraldo Alckmin
- Sergipe:
  - Albano Franco (until 1 January)
  - João Filho (from 1 January)
- Tocantins: Marcelo Miranda (from 1 January)

=== Vice governors ===
- Acre:
  - Edison Simão Cadaxo (until 1 January)
  - Arnóbio Marques de Almeida Júnior (from 1 January)
- Alagoas:
  - Geraldo Costa Sampaio (until 1 January)
  - Luís Abílio de Sousa Neto (from 1 January)
- Amapá:
  - Maria Dalva de Souza Figueiredo (until 1 January)
  - Pedro Paulo Dias de Carvalho (from 1 January)
- Amazonas:
  - Samuel Assayag Hanan (until 1 January)
  - Omar José Abdel Aziz (from 1 January)
- Bahia: Eraldo Tinoco Melo (from 1 January)
- Ceará: Francisco de Queiroz Maia Júnior (from 1 January)
- Espírito Santo:
  - Celso José Vasconcelos (until 1 January)
  - Wellington Coimbra (from 1 January)
- Goiás: Alcides Rodrigues Filho
- Maranhão: Jurandir Ferro do Lago Filho (from 1 January)
- Mato Grosso: Iraci Araújo Moreira (from 1 January)
- Mato Grosso do Sul:
  - Moacir Kohl (until 1 January)
  - Egon Krakheche (from 1 January)
- Minas Gerais:
  - Newton Cardoso (until 1 January)
  - Clésio Soares de Andrade (from 1 January)
- Pará:
  - Hildegardo de Figueiredo Nunes (until 1 January)
  - Valéria Pires Franco (from 1 January)
- Paraíba: Lauremília Lucena (from 1 January)
- Paraná:
  - Emília de Sales Belinati (until 1 January)
  - Orlando Pessuti (from 1 January)
- Pernambuco: José Mendonça Bezerra Filho
- Piauí:
  - Felipe Mendes de Oliveira (until 1 January)
  - Osmar Ribeiro de Almeida Júnior (from 1 January)
- Rio de Janeiro: Luiz Paulo Conde (from 1 January)
- Rio Grande do Norte:
  - Vacant (until 1 January)
  - Antônio Jácome (from 1 January)
- Rio Grande do Sul:
  - Miguel Soldatelli Rossetto (until 1 January)
  - Antônio Carlos Hohlfeldt (from 1 January)
- Rondônia:
  - Miguel de Souza (until 1 January)
  - Odaísa Fernandes Ferreira (from 1 January)
- Roraima:
  - Salomão Afonso de Souza Cruz (1 January-10 November)
  - Erci de Moraes (from 10 November)
- Santa Catarina: Eduardo Pinho Moreira (from 1 January)
- São Paulo:
  - Vacant (until 1 January)
  - Claudio Lembo (from 1 January)
- Sergipe:
  - Benedito de Figueiredo (until 1 January)
  - Marília Mandarino (from 1 January)
- Tocantins:
  - João Lisboa da Cruz (until 1 January)
  - Raimundo Nonato Pires dos Santos (from 1 January)

== Events ==
=== January ===
- January 1: Syndicalist leader and leader of the Workers' Party, Luiz Inácio Lula da Silva is inaugurated as President of Brazil.
- January 28: 18-year-old Edmar Freitas opens fire on students and classmates in a school in Taiúva, wounding eight people before killing himself.
- January 30: President Luiz Inácio Lula da Silva introduces the Fome Zero program, in order to eradicate hunger and extreme poverty in the country.

=== June ===
- June 20: An earthquake that reaches a 7.0 magnitude on the Richter scale, hits the state of Amazonas. It is the biggest tremor recorded in Brazil.

=== August ===
- August 19: A car-bomb attack on United Nations headquarters in Iraq kills the agency's top envoy Sérgio Vieira de Mello and 21 other employees.
- August 22: An explosion at the Alcântara Launch Center kills 21 scientists. This would become the biggest accident in the history of the Brazilian space program.

=== September ===
- September 2: Minister of Culture Gilberto Gil is awarded the Latin Grammy for Latin Recording Academy Person of the Year.

=== October ===
- October 20: President Lula da Silva introduces Bolsa Família, a unified social welfare program.

== Births ==
- June 21: Giovana Queiroz, football player
- August 11: Poubel Filho, politician

== Deaths ==
=== January ===
- January 25: Scylla Médici, First Lady of Brazil (1969-1974) (b. 1907)

=== March ===
- March 7: José Márcio Ayres, conservationist and zoologist (b. 1954)

=== April ===
- April 24: Gino Orlando, footballer (b. 1929)

=== May ===
- May 8: Elvira Pagã, vedette (b. 1920)
- May 25: Almir Chediak, musician and entrepreneur (b. 1950)

=== June ===
- June 12: Itamar Assumpção, songwriter and composer (b. 1949)

=== July ===
- July 28: Noite Ilustrada, singer-songwriter (b. 1928)
- July 31: Bigode, footballer (b. 1922)

=== August ===
- August 6: Roberto Marinho, founder of Grupo Globo, the largest mass media company in Brazil and Latin America (b. 1904)
- August 19: Sérgio Vieira de Mello, United Nations diplomat (b. 1948)

== See also ==
- 2003 in Brazilian football
- 2003 in Brazilian television
- List of Brazilian films of 2003
