= 2003 in Brazilian television =

This is a list of Brazilian television related events from 2003.

== Events ==
- 1 February - TV Paranaíba in Uberlândia leaves Rede Bandeirantes due to the arrival of Show da Fé during prime time potentially depriving affiliates from vital income, and joins Rede Record from that day on.
- 1 April - Dhomini Ferreira wins season 3 of Big Brother Brasil.

== Television shows ==
=== 1970s ===
- Turma da Mônica (1976–present)

=== 1990s ===
- Malhação (1995–2020)
- Cocoricó (1996–2013)

=== 2000s ===
- Sítio do Picapau Amarelo (2001–2007)
- Big Brother Brasil (2002–present)
- FAMA (2002-2005)

== Networks and services ==
=== Launches ===
Network	Type	Launch date	Notes	Source
Baby TV	Cable and satellite	4 September		

=== Conversions and rebrandings ===
Old network name	New network name	Type	Conversion Date	Notes	Source
UniTV	Nova Geracao de Televisao	Cable and satellite	8 October		

== See also ==
- 2003 in Brazil
- List of Brazilian films of 2003
