= List of Brazilian films of 1937 =

List Of Brazilian Produced Films

A list of films produced in Brazil in 1937:

Title	Director	Cast	Genre	Notes
Alegria	Oduvaldo Vianna	Gilda de Abreu		
Bombonzinho	Mesquitinha	Dircinha Batista, Oscarito	Comedy	
Maria Bonita	Julien Mandel	Eliane Angel, Victor Macedo, Marília Batista	Adventure	
O Bobo do Rei	Mesquitinha	Mesquitinha, Dea Selva, Augusto Henrique	Comedy	
O Grito da Mocidade	Raul Roulien	María Amaro, Orlando Brito, Alzirinha Camargo	Comedy	
Samba da Vida	Luiz de Barros	Jaime Costa, Manoelino Teixeira, Pinto Filho	Musical comedy	

== See also ==
- 1937 in Brazil
