= 1985 in Brazilian television =

This is a list of Brazilian television related events from 1985.

== Events ==
- 2 February – TV Bahia conducts its first test broadcast.
- April – TV Globo celebrates its 20th anniversary of broadcasts.
- 21 April – Fantástico from TV Globo announces the death of Tancredo Neves.
- 24 April – The funeral procession of Tancredo Neves is televised throughout this day, and the tragedy is reported across various Grupo Globo news outlets.

== Television shows ==
=== 1970s ===
- Turma da Mônica (1976–present)
- Sítio do Picapau Amarelo (1977–1986)

=== 1980s ===
- Balão Mágico (TV series) (1983-1986)

== Births ==
- 21 April - Paloma Bernardi, actress & dancer
- 4 July - Mariana Rios, actress, singer-songwriter & TV host

== See also ==
- 1985 in Brazil
- List of Brazilian films of 1985
