= List of Brazilian films of 1985 =

A list of films produced in Brazil in 1985:

Title	Director	Cast	Genre	Notes
24 Hours of Explicit Sex	José Mojica Marins	Vânia Bonier, Albano Catozzi, Bené de Oliveira, Sílvio Júnior	Sexploitation	
Agite Antes de Usar	Black Cavalcanti	Iris Peralta, Anita Calabrez, Andrev Soler	Pornographic	
AIDS, Furor do Sexo Explícito	Victor Triunfo	Alan Fontaine, Eliane Gabarron, Walter Gabarron, Pedro Terra, Antonio Santos	Pornographic	
Além da Paixão	Bruno Barreto	Regina Duarte, Paulo Castelli	Drama	
Amante Profissional	Antonio Meliande	Wagner Maciel, Andrea Pucci	Pornographic	
Aqueles Dois	Sérgio Amon	Pedro Wayne, Beto Ruas, Suzana Saldanha	Drama	
Areias Escaldantes	Francisco de Paula	Diogo Vilela, Cristina Aché, Regina Casé, Luiz Fernando Guimarães	Musical comedy	
Avaete, Seed of Revenge	Zelito Viana	Hugo Carvana, Renata Sorrah	Drama	Entered into the 14th Moscow International Film Festival
As Aventuras de Sérgio Malandro	Erasto Filho	Sérgio Mallandro, Cosme dos Santos, Pedro de Lara	Comedy	
Bacanal na Ilha da Fantasia	Hércules Breseghelo	Jonia Freund, Soriane Carneiro, Oasis Minniti, Luciana Dantas	Pornographic	
Os Bons Tempos Voltaram: Vamos Gozar Outra Vez	Ivan Cardoso, John Herbert	Carla Camurati, Paulo César Grande, Alexandre Frota, Pedro Cardoso	Pornochanchada	
Brás Cubas	Júlio Bressane	Luiz Fernando Guimarães, Bia Nunes, Ankito	Drama	
Chico Rei	Walter Lima Jr.	Severino d'Acelino, Antonio Pitanga, Carlos Kroeber, Cosme dos Santos, Cláudio Marzo	Historical drama	
Estrela Nua	José Antônio Garcia, Ícaro Martins	Carla Camurati, Cristina Aché	Drama	
Jogo Duro	Ugo Giorgetti	Cininha de Paula, Jesse James, Carlos Augusto Carvalho	Drama	
Kiss of the Spider Woman	Hector Babenco	William Hurt, Raúl Juliá, Sonia Braga, José Lewgoy	Drama	Entered into the 1985 Cannes Film Festival
Hour of the Star	Suzana Amaral	Marcélia Cartaxo	Drama	Cartaxo won the Silver Bear for Best Actress at Berlin
A Marvada Carne	André Klotzel	Fernanda Torres, Adilson Barros	Comedy	
Noite	Gilberto Loureiro	Neville de Almeida, Paulo César Peréio, Eduardo Tornaghi, Otávio Augusto, Nelson Dantas	Drama	
Pedro Mico	Ipojuca Pontes	Pelé, Tereza Rachel	Drama	
O Rei do Rio	Fábio Barreto	Nuno Leal Maia, Nelson Xavier, Andrea Beltrão, Milton Gonçalves	Drama	
Rock Estrela	Lael Rodrigues	Diogo Vilela, Léo Jaime, Malu Mader, Vera Mossa	Musical	
Os Trapalhões no Rabo do Cometa	Dedé Santana	Os Trapalhões, Mauricio de Sousa, José Vasconcellos	Comedy	
Os Trapalhões no Reino da Fantasia	Dedé Santana	Os Trapalhões, Xuxa Meneghel	Comedy	The most watched Brazilian film in 1985 and the only with more than 1 million attendances

== See also ==
- 1985 in Brazil
- 1985 in Brazilian television
