= Valadares Filho =

Brazilian politician (born 1980)

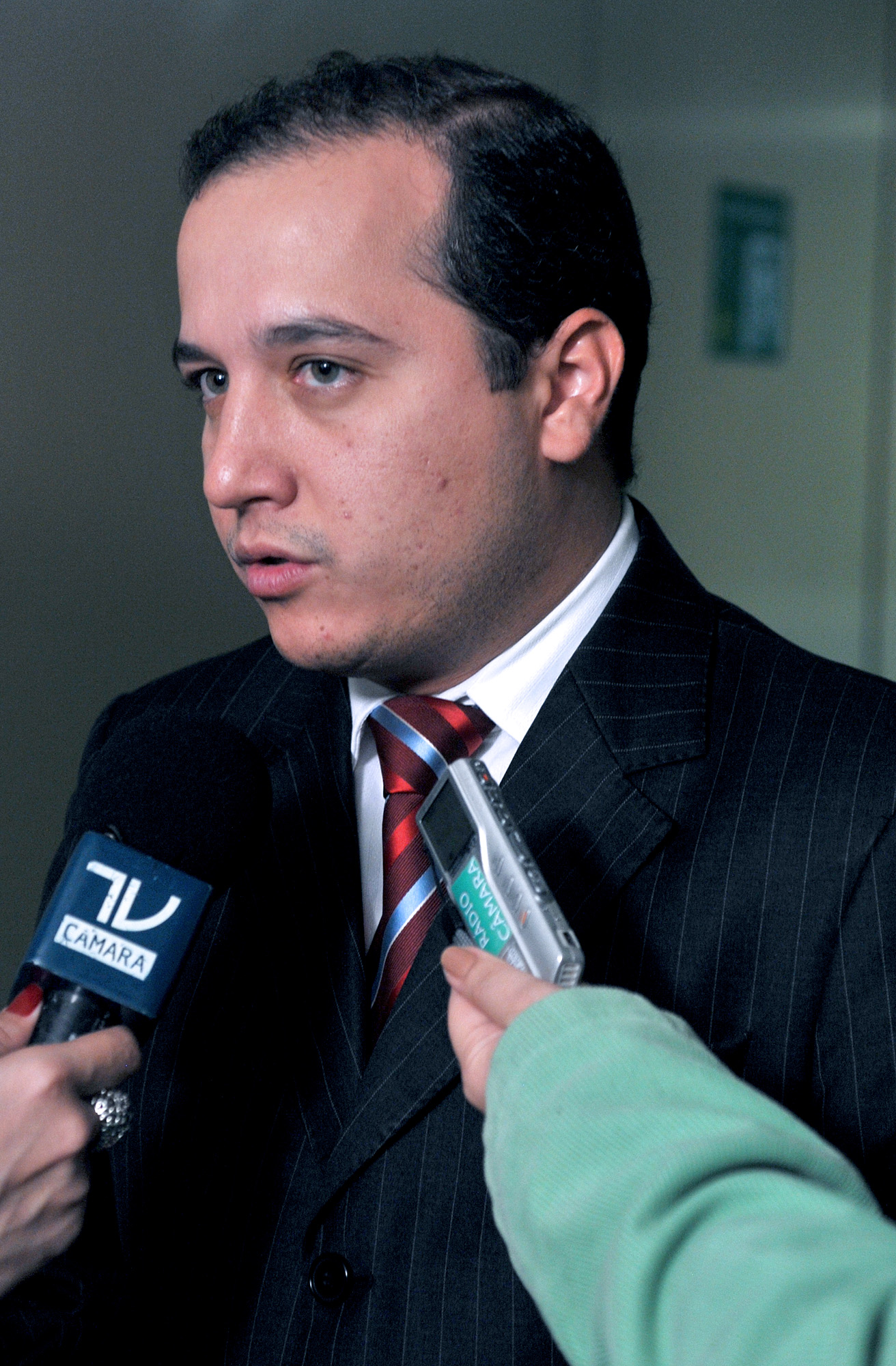

Member of the Chamber of Deputies
- In office 1 February 2007 – 31 January 2019
- Constituency: Sergipe

Personal details
- Born: 1 October 1980 (age 45)
- Party: Solidarity (since 2024)
- Parent: Antônio Carlos Valadares (father)

Antônio Carlos Valadares Filho (born 1 October 1980), better known as Valadares Filho, is a Brazilian politician. From 2007 to 2019, he was a member of the Chamber of Deputies. He is the son of Antônio Carlos Valadares.
