= List of Brazilian films of 2003 =

The following films were produced in Brazil in 2003 (see 2003 in film).

== 2003 ==
Title	Director	Cast	Genre	Notes
A Festa de Margarette			Comedy	
Acquaria				
Aleijadinho - Paixão, Glória e Suplício			Drama	
Amor Só de Mãe				
Amor-Clichê				
Apolônio Brasil, Campeão da Alegria				
Aquarela				
As Alegres Comadres				
Banda de Ipanema - Folia de Albino			Documentary	
Carandiru	Héctor Babenco	Rodrigo Santoro	Drama	Entered into the 2003 Cannes Film Festival
Casseta & Planeta: A Taça do Mundo É Nossa			Comedy	
Cristina Quer Casar			Romantic comedy	
De Passagem			Drama	
Deus é Brasileiro	Cacá Diegues	Antônio Fagundes, Wagner Moura	Comedy	
Didi: O Cupido Trapalhão		Renato Aragão	Comedy	
Dom			Drama	
Garrincha - Estrela Solitária			Drama	One win and two nominations in various events
Gregório de Mattos			Drama	
Lisbela e o Prisioneiro			Romantic comedy	Two wins and ten nominations for Cinema Brazil Grand Prize
The Man Who Copied	Jorge Furtado	Lázaro Ramos	Drama, comedy, romance	11 wins and three nominations in various events
Maria, Mãe do Filho de Deus			Drama	
O Martelo de Vulcano				
Morte Densa			Documentary	
Motoboys: Vida loca			Documentary	
Narradores de Javé			Comedy	17 wins and 11 nominations
Noite de São João	Eliane Caffé		Drama	
O Corneteiro Lopes			Drama, short	
O Diário de Julia			Drama, short	
O Homem do Ano			Comedy, crime	Seven wins and seven nominations in various events
O Preço da Paz			Drama	11 wins and three nominations in various events
Os Amantes Ou Da Incomum Arte de Se Achar Sem Se Perder				
Os Normais		Luiz Fernando Guimarães, Fernanda Torres	Comedy	
Rio de Jano			Documentary	Documentary about the city of Rio de Janeiro
Rua 6, Sem Número			Drama	
Tempo de Resistência			Documentary	
Vida de Menina			Drama	
Viva Voz			Romantic comedy	One win at the New York International Independent Film & Video Festival
Xuxa Abracadabra		Xuxa		
Zagati				

== See also ==
- 2003 in Brazil
- 2003 in Brazilian television
