= 1987 in Brazilian television =

This is a list of Brazilian television related events from 1987.

== Television shows ==
=== 1970s ===
- Turma da Mônica (1976–present)

=== 1980s ===
- Xou da Xuxa (1986-1992)

== Networks and services ==
=== Conversions and rebrandings ===
Old network name	New network name	Type	Conversion Date	Notes	Source
TV Cultura	Rádio e Televisão Cultura	Cable and satellite	Unknown		

== Births ==
- 19 June - Sthefany Brito, actress
- 24 July - Rainer Cadete, actor
- 11 August - Jonatas Faro, actor & singer
- 21 October - Tiago Abravanel, actor & singer
- 1 November - Marcello Melo Jr., actor, singer-songwriter & model

== See also ==
- 1987 in Brazil
