= Baby.com.br =

Brazilian retailer of baby products

- Industry: E-commerce
- Founded: São Paulo, Brazil (October 2011)
- Founders: Davis Smith, Kimball Thomas, McKay Thomas
- Headquarters: São Paulo
- Website: baby.com.br

Baby.com.br was an e-commerce retailer of baby products in Brazil. The company was based in São Paulo, Brazil and sold exclusively online. In 2014, it merged with its main rival, BebeStore.

== History ==
The company was founded by three American family members, Davis Smith and brothers Kimball Thomas and McKay Thomas, with Davis Smith as a graduate student at the Wharton School and Kimball Thomas at Harvard Business School. McKay Thomas was first on the ground in Brazil in March 2011 followed by co-founders Davis Smith and Kimball Thomas later that July. The company launched in October 2011 with 10 employees. The company's "CMO" (Chief Mommy Officer) was Brazilian celebrity Angélica, who also invested in the company with her celebrity husband Luciano Huck.

== Funding ==
In February 2011, Baby.com.br received its first round of funding of $4.4 million from Monashees Capital, Tiger Global Management, Felicis Ventures, Social+Capital Partners and Ron Conway's SV Angel. One year later, in March 2012, the company raised $16.7 million in a round led by Accel Partners.

== Merger ==
In July 2014, BebeStore acquired Baby.com.br's assets. Baby.com.br had generated 32 million reais in revenue in 2013, compared to BebeStore's 48 million reais.

== Awards and recognition ==
- Harvard Business Plan Contest 1st Place Winner - HBS Business Plan Contest 2011.
- Forbes Top 10 Startups in Brazil 2011.
- Brazil's Startup of the Year 2012, Pequenas Empresas Grandes Negocios.
