= Thiago Garrocho =

Brazilian politician (born 1987)

Member of the Legislative Assembly of Espírito Santo
- Incumbent
- Assumed office 1 February 2027

Personal details
- Born: 19 March 1987 (age 39)
- Party: Liberal Party

Thiago Batista Garrocho Maximiano (born 19 March 1987) is a Brazilian politician who was elected member of the Legislative Assembly of Espírito Santo in 2026. He has been a municipal councillor of Guarapari since 2025.
