= Paulo de Tarso Alvim =

Brazilian scientist (1919–2011)

Paulo de Tarso Alvim (1919 - 18 February 2011) was a Brazilian agronomic engineer and professor who received the Order of Scientific Merit in Biology. He taught at the Federal University of Viçosa.
