= Lily Marinho =

Brazilian arts patron, philanthropist, and socialite

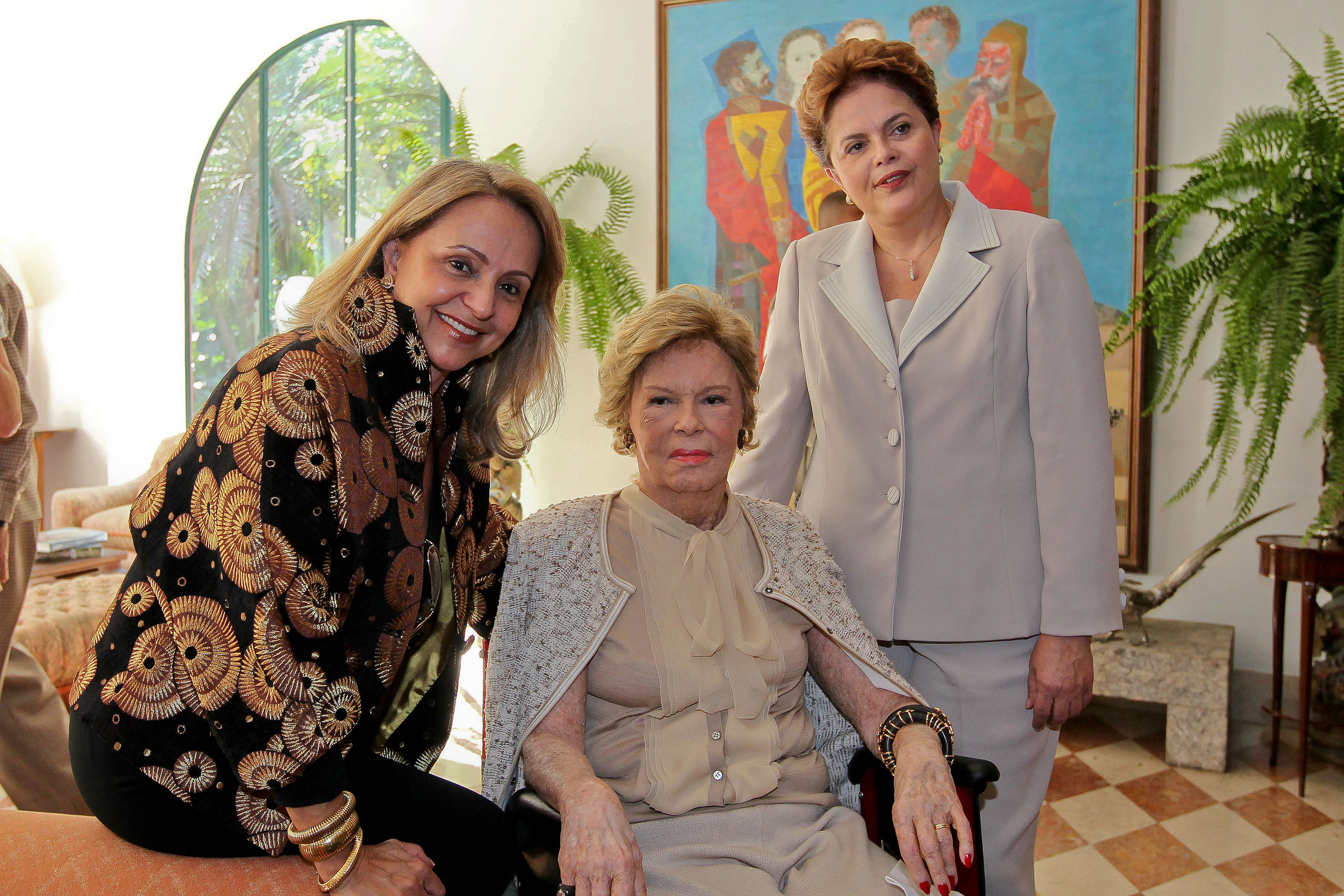
- Marinho (middle) at a luncheon in 2010
- Born: Lily Monique Lemb; May 10, 1921; Cologne, Germany
- Died: January 5, 2011 (aged 89); Rio de Janeiro, Brazil
- Spouse(s): Horacio de Carvalho; Roberto Marinho (d. 2003)

Lily Monique de Carvalho Marinho (May 10, 1921 – January 5, 2011) was a Brazilian television arts patron, philanthropist and socialite. Marinho, the widow of media mogul and Rede Globo founder Roberto Marinho, served as a UNESCO Goodwill Ambassador for peace beginning in 1999.

== Biography ==
Marinho was born Lily Monique Lemb in Cologne, Germany, on May 10, 1921. She was the only daughter of British soldier John Lemb and his French wife, Jeanne Bergeon. She was born in Germany because her father was stationed in the country during the post-World War I period. However, she was raised in Paris. During her life, Marinho was married to two of Brazil's wealthiest men - Horacio de Carvalho and Roberto Marinho, who both owned newspapers. Her second husband, media mogul Roberto Marinho, died in 2003.

A patron of the arts, Marinho spearheaded and financed high-profile art exhibitions in Brazil, including works by Claude Monet, Auguste Rodin, Camille Claudel and Pablo Picasso.

Lily Marinho died of respiratory failure on January 5, 2011, in Rio de Janeiro at the age of 89. She had been hospitalized at the Clínica São Vicente in the Gávea neighborhood of the Southern Zone of the city since December 14, 2010. She was buried in the Cemitério São João Batista in the Botafogo neighborhood of Rio de Janeiro.
