= Base Hospital of the Federal District =

Base Hospital of the Federal District Hospital de Base do Distrito Federal
- Sistema Único de Saúde
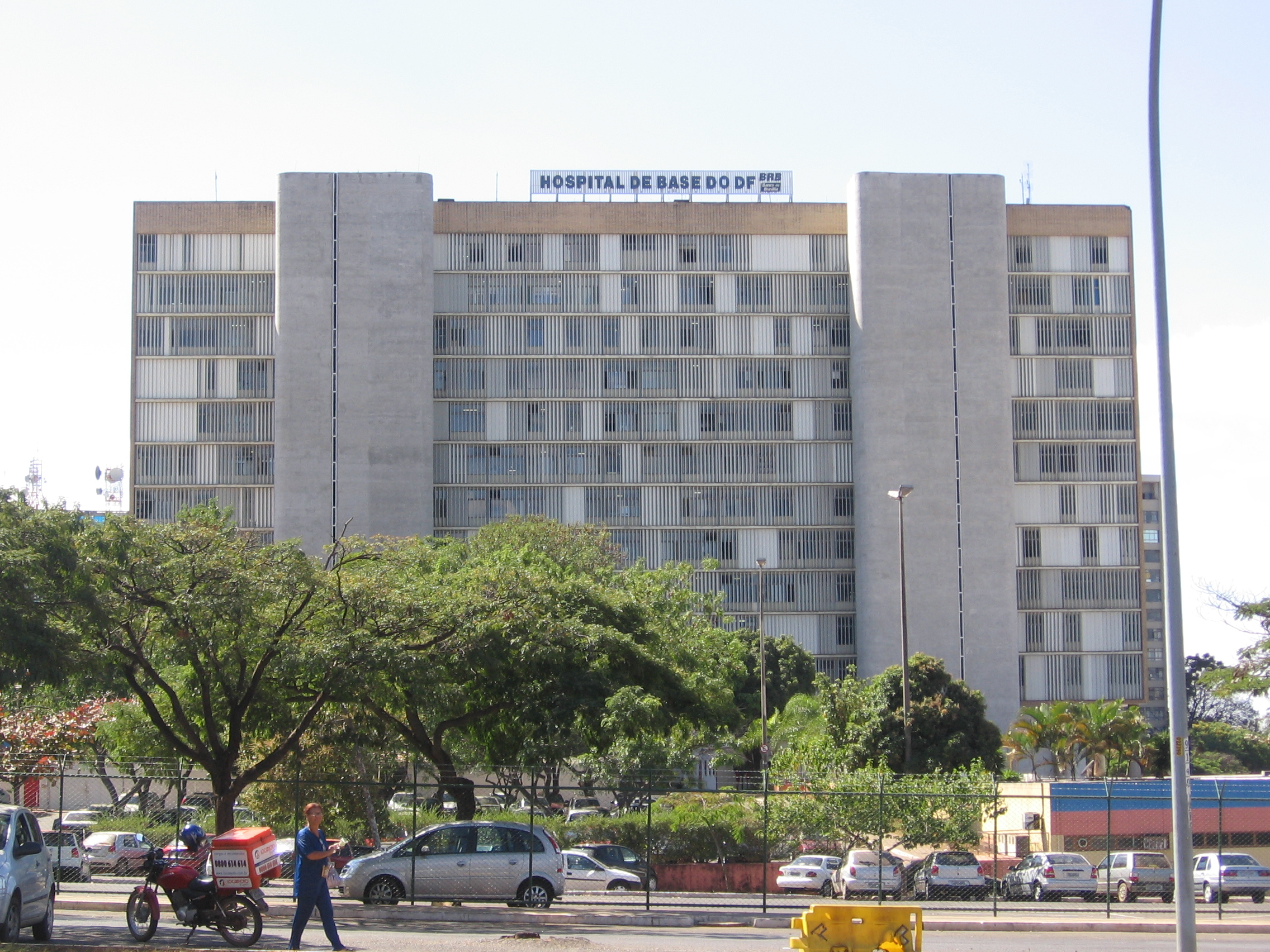

Geography
- Location: Brasília, Federal District, Brazil
- Coordinates: 15°48′02.35″S 47°53′17.82″W

Organisation
- Type: District General hospital

Services
- Emergency department: Yes
- Beds: 833

History
- Founded: 12 September 1960 (age 65)

Links
- Lists: Hospitals in Brazil

The Base Hospital of the Federal District (Portuguese: Hospital de Base do Distrito Federal) is a hospital in Brasília, and is part of the Unified Health System. It is the second largest hospital in numbers of hospital beds in the Center-West Region, Brazil. The hospital opened on September 12, 1960, anniversary date of the President Juscelino Kubitschek.

Currently HB's staff of over 3,500 provides the largest number of inpatient treatments in the city and conducts over 600,000 visits to the emergency department and the outpatient clinic annually. Of these, are performed around 12,000 surgeries. It has 200 toilets, 14 lifts, over 52 thousand square meters of constructed area. It is also reference in Oncology, Nuclear Medicine, Transplant surgery, Epilepsy Treatment, Multiple sclerosis and 24 hours accident & emergency service.

On March 14, 1985, it received the President-elect Tancredo Neves, a day before taking office, he felt severe abdominal pain. After surgery, he was transferred on March 26 to the Heart Institute of São Paulo.
