= 2011 Rio de Janeiro restaurant explosion =

2011 restaurant explosion in Rio de Janeiro, Brazil

- Date: October 13, 2011
- Time: 7:30 a.m. (BRT (UTC−03:00))
- Venue: Filé Carioca restaurant
- Location: Praça Tiradentes, Rio de Janeiro, Brazil
- Type: Explosion
- Cause: Unauthorized storage of LPG
- Deaths: 4
- Injuries: 17
- Convicted: Carlos Rogério do Amaral

The explosion at the Filé Carioca restaurant occurred on the morning of October 13, 2011, at Praça Tiradentes, downtown area, in Rio de Janeiro.

== Background ==
The Filé Carioca restaurant was located on the ground floor of the eleven-story Riqueza building on Rua da Carioca, in Praça Tiradentes, in a central part of the city of Rio de Janeiro. The restaurant had been recently renovated and was a popular lunch spot for office workers in that area, including employees of Petrobras, Brazilian Development Bank (BNDES), and Caixa. In August 2010, the owner, Carlos Rogério do Amaral, reported that he had fixed a malfunction in the restaurant's exhaust system. That same year, a report from the fire department prohibited the use of cooking gas or piped gas on the premises. Filé Carioca held a provisional permit and was awaiting authorization from other agencies to obtain a permanent license.

== Explosion ==
External videos
- Security camera footage of the explosion

On October 13, 2011, before the explosion, employees smelled gas and tried to contact the restaurant owner, according to Jorge Luiz Rosa Leão, the owner of a newsstand located across from the restaurant. One employee asked if he had the restaurant owner's phone number, and then another remarked that there was a strong smell of gas. Minutes before the explosion, around 7:30 a.m., a third person bought a pack of cigarettes at the newsstand. The explosion occurred around that time. The street was empty, and there were no customers in the restaurant. Even so, three bodies were thrown at least ten meters from the site. The blast's impact reached eight stories up. A fourth victim of the accident, who had been hospitalized, died on the 19th.

== Investigation ==
The Rio Gas Distribution Company (CEG) stated on the same day that "it has not supplied piped gas to the building where the explosion occurred since 1961," and that "it was notified by the Fire Department at 7:42 a.m. Six industrial gas cylinders, each containing 45 liters, were removed from the site. The Riqueza building remained closed until January 7, 2016, when it reopened.

In 2019, the 19th Criminal Court of Rio sentenced Carlos Rogério do Amaral to seven years in prison under a closed-prison regime, while nine other defendants in the case were acquitted. In her ruling, Judge Lucia Regina Esteves de Magalhães stated: "Although the defendant did not have approval from the Fire Department to use gas in his establishment, he used it freely and knowingly, aware of the danger posed by its clandestine use, in disregard of technical standards, and assuming the risk of endangering the safety of the establishment's customers and employees, as well as the large number of passersby who walked by the location daily."
