= Exxótica =

Brazilian rock band

- Origin: São Paulo, São Paulo, Brazil
- Genres: Hard rock
- Years active: 2001–2011, 2014
- Label: Independent
- Past members: Daniel Iasbeck “Reverendo” Marcelo Rossi; João Guilherme Rocha; Fábio Hoffmann; Leonardo Tomazelli; Guto Mansoreitch; Boris “O Louco” Roberto Redondano; Gabi Silvestri; Vagner Nascimento
- Website: https://www.youtube.com/watch?v=MqRqCI4aBbw

Exxótica was a Brazilian rock band created in 2001 in São Paulo, initially formed by Daniel Iasbeck (vocals/guitar) and “Reverendo” Marcelo Rossi (vocals/bass). The main idea was to create a rock band, singing in Portuguese, with good lyrics, music, and outstanding visual, more than any other Brazilian band. Came along the journey Fábio Hoffmann (guitar/vocals) and Beto "Espectro" Redondano (drums).

In 2002, they released its debut disc named “Estranhos no Ninho”, with the support of Aqualung Records. The band’s music and looks certainly created a buzz in the scene, with good reviews everywhere, from magazines, newspapers to some TV shows, including their first live appearance at MTV’s João Gordo Show. The first pressing of the album was gone by the end of the year.

Next year, 2003, they hit the road promoting the “O CD Mais Barato do Mundo” EP. It was a clever move, selling it for the cheapest price possible (R$1,99 – the EP’s translated title is “The cheapest CD of the world”), reaching as many people possible, while starting to write the next album.

In 2004 came the new album “Capítulo II” (“Chapter Two”), again released in partnership with Aqualung Records. The first show promoting the new album was packed at São Paulo's Cultural Center and making the new album a hit, selling three times more than the first in a short time. While on tour, early next year, Exxótica was added to MTV's rock shows rotation with the video of the song “É Dificil”.

It did not take much longer for the band releasing their first DVD, actually a double DVD named “Ao vivo, Ao Morto e A Cores”. One disc contains several takes of the innumerous gigs of the band, guitar lessons and extras. The other disc is the first DVD of a band with videos for all music in an album. That's right: every song on the “Capitulo II” CD has its own video, plus three videos off the first record.

The same year, the famous Brazilian cartoonist Márcio Baraldi invited the band to make the soundtrack of his video game “Roko Loko no Castelo do Ratozinger”, distributed by Rock Brigade magazine. In the same partnership with Márcio, the band re-released the “Capítulo II” record as part of the MP3 Magazine, spreading their music in every newsstand around the country.

In 2006, the band surprises its fans once more with two new albums released at the same time: “III” and “IV”, with the signature of Mozart Couto (Marvel Comics) on its CD cover. Their first official fan-club was born: “Estranhos no Ninho Fã Clube”.

At Dynamite's magazine Day of Rock awards, Exxótica was indicated to the Best Show Award, along with some of Brazilian biggest musical names like Titãs, Charlie Brown Jr., Cachorro Grande and Nação Zumbi.

The Escala Publishing, owner of MP3 Magazine, certified the band with a Gold Record Award because “Capitulo II” and “Roko Loko” game selling of more than 54.000 copies around the country. The “III” and “IV” were sold in the MP3 Magazine next, eventually hitting once again the 50.000 copies mark, as the band released their first compilation album, available for free download at the band’s official website. To celebrate such a great year, Exxótica filmed a concert at EM&T and released it on DVD video in 2007. The DVD name “Exxótica em Ação” got great reviews from fans and critics.

As they were on the road, the band was invited to play in many festivals around the country, including the Kiss Fest concert, with Bruce Kulick as the festival headliner. In result of all this hard work, the band’s merchandising was completed sold out.

Exxótica also received the double-gold record certified for the 100.000 copies of MP3 Magazine with the “Capitulo II” record and a triple-platinum certified for the 400.000 copies of the “Roko Loko” game.

In 2008, the band released a new album entitled “Jogos de Azar: 6ª Rodada”, with 15 brand new tracks, and a new live DVD named “Em Reação”, with a live performance at the Blackmore Rock Bar and a live performance in studio.

In late 2010, Exxótica was in studio recording a new album. Exxótica announced on January 4, 2011 that guitarist Fábio Hoffmann was replaced by Vagner Nascimento. They were also looking for a new drummer.

By May 2, 2011, Exxótica announced via Orkut the end of its activities. Reverendo also announced that he's forming a new band called Reverendo. By 2012, Daniel Iasbeck formed, along with Reinaldo Almeida, the hard rock band Ultrasigno.

In December 2014, the band reunited and released the EP "Não Me Cobre".

== Discography ==
=== Studio albums ===
- Estranhos no Ninho (2002)
- Capítulo II (2004)
- III (2006)
- IV (2006)
- Jogos de Azar: 6ª Rodada (2008)

=== Compilations & EPs ===
- O CD Mais Barato do Mundo (2003) (EP)
- Roko-Loko no Castelo do Ratozinger (2005) (Soundtrack)
- Arquivo (2006) (Compilation)
- ArquiVo (2007) (Re-issue with bonus tracks)
- Não Me Cobre (2014)

== Videography ==
- Ao Vivo, ao Morto e a Cores (2005)
- Em Ação! (2007)
- Em Reação (2008)
