= TV Brasil Central =

Television station in Goiânia, Brazil

TV Brasil Central (ZYP 327)
- Goiânia, Goiás; Brazil
- Channels: Digital: 34 (UHF); Virtual: 13
- Branding: TV Brasil Central

Programming
- Affiliations: TV Cultura

Ownership
- Owner: (Government of the State of Goiás)

History
- Founded: May 1, 1975
- First air date: May 1, 1975
- Former channel numbers: Analog: 13 (VHF, 1975–2017)
- Former affiliations: Independent (1975-1978); Rede Bandeirantes (1978-1995)

Technical information
- Licensing authority: ANATEL
- ERP: 1.55 kW
- Transmitter coordinates: 16°39′50.3″S 49°20′31.4″W

Links
- Public license information: Profile
- Website: goias.gov.br/abc/tv-brasil-central/

TV Brasil Central (channel 13) is a Brazilian television station based in Goiânia, capital of the state of Goiás. The station is owned by the state's government.

== History ==
TV Brasil Central's license, which was initially private, was granted in 1968, before being taken by the government of Goiás. The government had plans for a television license as early as 1964, when Mauro Borges was governor, but reached its ignition only in the early 70s, during Leonino di Ramos Caiado's government. In March 1975, the station started test broadcasts, becoming regular on May 1, 1975, during Irapuan Costa Júnior's government.

Initially, the station was independent, broadcasting movies, cartoons and documentaries from catalogs of foreign companies. In 1978, it became an affiliate of Rede Bandeirantes. It was founded by Cerne (Consórcio de Empresas e Rádiodifusão de Notícias do Estado) through AGN (Agência Goiana de Notícias). In the Bandeirantes phase, it covered the 1987 Goiânia accident.

In 1995, TBC leaves Bandeirantes and joins TV Cultura. On October 2, 1997, a fire destroyed part of the station's facilities; it wasn't until December 1998 when TV Brasil Central restarted operations from its usual facilities, following a year of operations from improvised facilities. In 1999, Cerne was liquidated by the state government and, in its place, a new company, Agecom (Agência Goiana de Comunicação) was created. Agecom was, in turn, shut down in 2014 and replaced by Agência Brasil Central (ABC).

In May 2011, TV Brasil Central was renamed TBC News, ceasing the relays of TV Cultura programming and concentrating on news. It also used the rebrand to increase its coverage to 50,000 Goianan inhabitants who did not receive its signal yet.

The station shut down its analog signal on June 21, 2017, following the official ANATEL roadmap.
