= Beni Veras =

Brazilian politician and businessman

Governor of Ceará
- In office April 5, 2002 – January 1, 2003
- Preceded by: Tasso Jereissati
- Succeeded by: Lúcio Alcântara

Vice Governor of Ceará
- In office January 1, 1999 – April 5, 2002
- Governor: Tasso Jereissati
- Preceded by: Moroni Torgan
- Succeeded by: Maia Júnior

Minister of Planning, Budget, and Management
- In office March 3, 1994 – January 1, 1995
- President: Itamar Franco
- Preceded by: Alexis Stepanenko
- Succeeded by: José Serra

Personal details
- Born: August 18, 1935 Crateús, Ceará, Brazil
- Died: November 6, 2015 (aged 80) Fortaleza, Ceará, Brazil
- Party: PSDB
- Spouse: Vanda de Sousa Alcântara
- Children: Four

Benedito Clayton Veras Alcântara, known by Beni Veras, (August 18, 1935 – November 6, 2015) was a Brazilian politician and businessman. He served as the governor of Ceará from April 5, 2002, to January 1, 2003, following the resignation of his predecessor, Governor Tasso Jereissati. He had previously served as a member of the Federal Senate from Ceará from 1991 to 1999, as well as the national Minister of Planning, Budget, and Management from 1994 to 1995 during the administration of President Itamar Franco. Veras was also a founder of Ceará state branch of the PSDB political party and contributed to the development of the Centro Industrial do Ceará (CIC) in Fortaleza, the state capital city.

Veras was born in Crateús, Ceará, in 1935. He attended school at the Liceu do Ceará. Veras was married to Vanda de Sousa Alcântara, with whom he had four children.

Beni Veras died in Fortaleza on November 6, 2015, at the age of 80. His funeral was held at the Palácio da Abolição in the Bairro Meireles neighborhood of Fortaleza. The Ceará state government declared three days of mourning following Veras' death.
