= Smoking in Brazil =

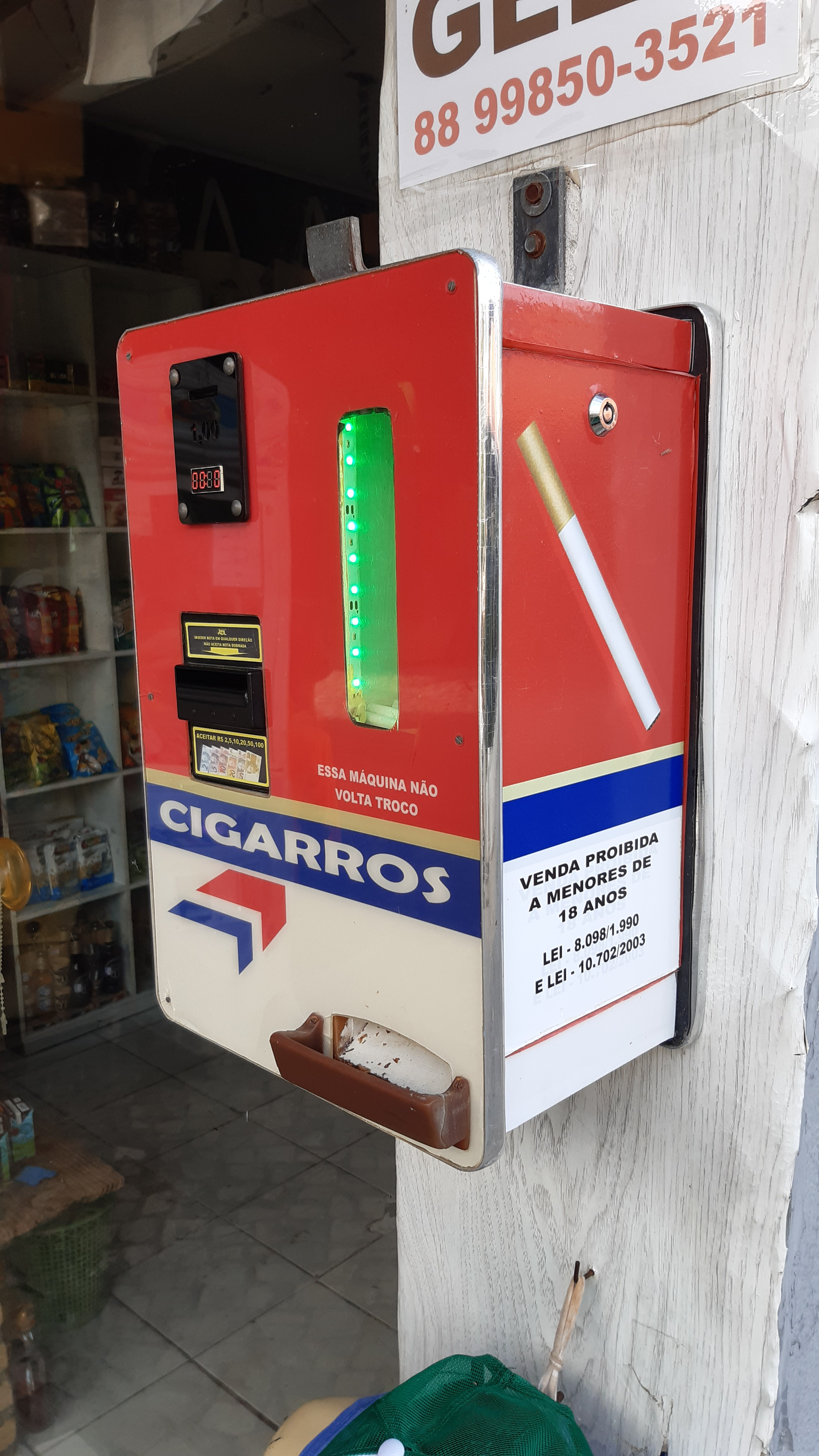
A cigarette dispenser in Canoa Quebrada, Brazil selling individual cigarettes for R$1 in 2024

Smoking rates in Brazil have been falling substantially since the 1980s. According to data from Vigitel, 9.3% of Brazilian adults smoked in 2023, compared to 34.8% in 1989. This decline reflects decades of public health campaigns and legal restrictions.

In 2005, Brazil ratified the World Health Organization (WHO) Framework Convention on Tobacco Control, providing an international basis for its policies. In 2024, a slight increase to 11.6% was observed, highlighting challenges such as the use of e-cigarettes (banned since 2009). Smoking has a massive impact on health; in 2020, it was responsible for 161,853 deaths (13% of the total) and economic costs exceeding 125 billion reais.

Smoking is recognized as a risk factor for numerous diseases (cancers, cardiovascular diseases, chronic lung diseases, etc.). In the 1970s, medical and public health movements began to warn of these risks in Brazil.

Since then, public policies have drastically reduced consumption. Research shows that the prevalence of adult smokers fell from 34.8% in 1989 to 12.6% in 2019 and 9.3% in 2023. This decline occurred across all subgroups: in 2019, 15.9% of men and 9.6% of women smoked. Smoking among young people is also low. The 2019 National School Health Survey (PeNSE) reported 6.8% of smokers among students aged 13–17.

== Descriptors on packaging ==
In 2001, Brazil outlawed the usage of descriptors, such as "light", "low tar" and "ultra-light".

== Flavored cigarettes ==
In 2012, Brazil outlawed flavored cigarettes, including menthol cigarettes, although the prohibition was revoked in 2013 by Rosa Weber, a judge of the Supreme Court.

== São Paulo ==
São Paulo became the first state in Brazil to adopt the most comprehensive ban, being followed by Rio de Janeiro and Minas Gerais. Under the new regulation there are no smoking sections in any place around the state. The law became effective from 7 August 2009 with smoking forbidden in all indoor and enclosed public spaces such as bars and restaurants, clubs, shopping malls, movie theatres, banks, supermarkets, bakeries, chemist shops, health places, government offices and schools.

Smoking is also no longer allowed in São Paulo in work and study places, libraries, buses, cabs, commercial and residential common areas, hotels and inns.

The São Paulo government has trained 500 specialised agents to make sure the rule is respected at all times. The first team was trained to measure ambient smoke in an area and to warn smokers about the risks for their health.

Anybody caught violating the law is charged with a fine. Public sites can be punished with a maximum fine of R$ 1,585 (Brazilian currency, ~$USD 478). If there is a second infraction, the site is closed. According to surveys, 88% of São Paulo's inhabitants support the smoke-free law.
