= Casildo Maldaner =

Brazilian politician and lawyer (1942–2021)

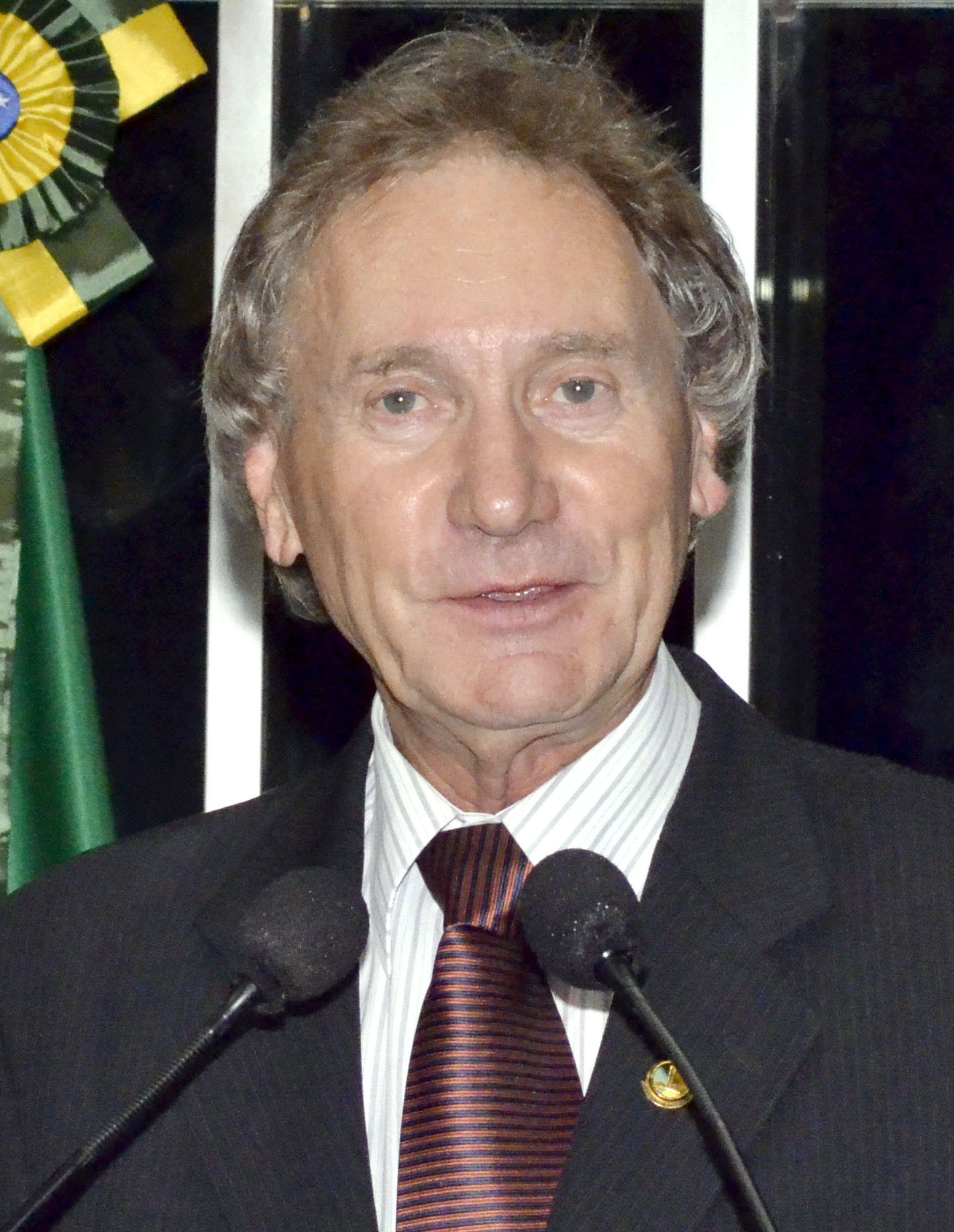

Senator from Santa Catarina
- In office January 1, 2011 – January 1, 2015

Governor of Santa Catarina
- In office March 27, 1990 – March 15, 1991

Personal details
- Born: 2 April 1942 Carazinho, Rio Grande do Sol
- Died: 17 May 2021 (aged 79)
- Party: Brazilian Social Democracy Party
- Profession: Lawyer

Casildo Maldaner (April 2, 1942 – May 17, 2021) was a Brazilian politician and lawyer. He represented Santa Catarina in the Federal Senate from 2011 to 2015. He was governor of Santa Catarina from 1990 to 1991. He was a member of the Brazilian Social Democracy Party.
