= 1904 in Brazilian football =

Football in Brazil
- Season: 1904

The following article presents a summary of the 1904 football (soccer) season in Brazil, which was the 3rd season of competitive football in the country.

== Campeonato Paulista ==
Final Standings

Position	Team	Points	Played	Won	Drawn	Lost	For	Against	Difference
1	São Paulo Athletic	18	10	8	2	0	28	4	24
2	Paulistano	18	10	8	2	0	20	6	14
3	SC Internacional de São Paulo	12	10	6	0	4	22	15	7
4	Mackenzie	6	10	3	0	7	11	21	−10
5	Germânia	4	10	2	0	8	11	18	−7
6	AA das Palmeiras	2	10	1	0	9	6	34	−28

Championship Playoff

October 30, 1904

São Paulo Athletic	1–0	Paulistano

São Paulo Athletic declared as the Campeonato Paulista champions.
