= 1929 in Brazilian football =

Football in Brazil
- Season: 1929

The following article presents a summary of the 1929 football (soccer) season in Brazil, which was the 28th season of competitive football in the country.

== Campeonato Paulista ==
In 1929 there were two different editions of the Campeonato Paulista. One was organized by the Associação Paulista de Esportes Atléticos (APEA) while the other one was organized by the Liga de Amadores de Futebol (LAF).

=== APEA's Campeonato Paulista ===
Final Standings

Position	Team	Points	Played	Won	Drawn	Lost	For	Against	Difference
1	Corinthians	14	7	7	0	0	33	8	25
2	Santos	11	7	5	1	1	30	13	17
3	Palestra Itália-SP	10	7	4	2	1	21	11	10
4	Portuguesa	8	7	3	2	2	20	22	−2
5	Guarani	6	7	2	2	3	15	15	0
6	Sírio	3	7	1	1	5	9	21	−12
7	Sílex	2	7	1	0	6	8	26	−18
8	Ypiranga-SP	2	7	1	0	6	8	28	−2

Corinthians declared as the APEA's Campeonato Paulista champions.

=== LAF's Campeonato Paulista ===
Final Standings

Position	Team	Points	Played	Won	Drawn	Lost	For	Against	Difference
1	Paulistano	30	19	14	2	3	53	15	38
2	Ponte Preta	26	20	12	2	6	55	36	19
3	SC Internacional de São Paulo	23	18	9	5	4	34	23	11
4	Independência	23	20	8	5	7	42	37	5
5	Hespanha	22	20	8	6	6	46	35	11
6	Atlético Santista	19	19	7	5	7	34	28	6
7	Germânia	18	18	8	2	8	38	45	−7
8	Portuguesa Santista	18	21	7	4	10	37	40	−3
9	Antártica	17	21	5	7	9	30	47	−17
10	AA São Bento	16	19	5	6	8	20	32	−12
11	AA das Palmeiras	11	17	5	1	11	28	50	−22
12	Paulista de Jundiaí	11	20	5	1	14	29	58	−29

The LAF's Campeonato Paulista was not concluded as APEA's and LAF's competitions fused, and Paulistano was declared as the LAF's Campeonato Paulista champions.

== State championship champions ==
State	Champion	State	Champion
Acre	—	Paraíba	Cabo Branco
Alagoas	CSA	Paraná	Atlético Paranaense
Amapá	—	Pernambuco	Torre
Amazonas	Manaus Sporting	Piauí	—
Bahia	Ypiranga-BA	Rio de Janeiro	Ypiranga
Ceará	Maguari	Rio de Janeiro (DF)	Vasco
Espírito Santo	Rio Branco-ES	Rio Grande do Norte	ABC
Goiás	—	Rio Grande do Sul	Cruzeiro-RS
Maranhão	not disputed	Rondônia	—
Mato Grosso	—	Santa Catarina	Caxias-SC
Minas Gerais	Palestra Itália-MG	São Paulo	Corinthians (by APEA); Paulistano (by LAF)
Pará	Paysandu	Sergipe	Sergipe

== Other competition champions ==
Competition	Champion
Campeonato Brasileiro de Seleções Estaduais	São Paulo

== Brazil national team ==
The following table lists all the games played by the Brazil national football team in official competitions and friendly matches during 1929.

Date	Opposition	Result	Score	Brazil scorers	Competition
January 6, 1929	(Argentina) Barracas	W	5–3	Pascoal, Nilo, Feitiço, Grané (2)	International Friendly (unofficial match)
February 24, 1929	(Uruguay) Rampla Juniors	W	4–2	Nilo (2), Serafini, Teóphilo	International Friendly (unofficial match)
July 10, 1929	(Hungary) Ferencváros	W	2–0	Feitiço, Petronilho	International Friendly (unofficial match)
