= Acari, Rio de Janeiro =

Acari
- Neighborhood
- Location in Rio de Janeiro Acari (Brazil)
- Coordinates: 22°49′18″S 43°20′26″W
- Country: Brazil
- State: Rio de Janeiro (RJ)
- Municipality/City: Rio de Janeiro
- Zone: North Zone

Population (2010)
  - Total: 27,347

Acari (Portuguese pronunciation: [ɐkɐˈɾi]) is a neighborhood in the North Zone of Rio de Janeiro, Brazil.
