= Dirceu Arcoverde =

Coordinates: 9.33778°S 42.4278°W

Dirceu Arcoverde Bom Jardim
- Municipality
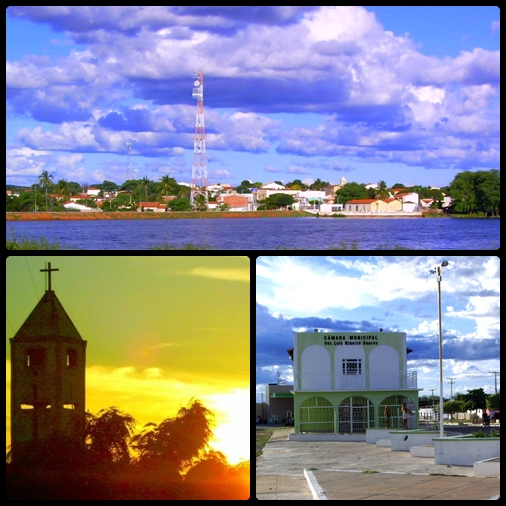
- View of the south side of town

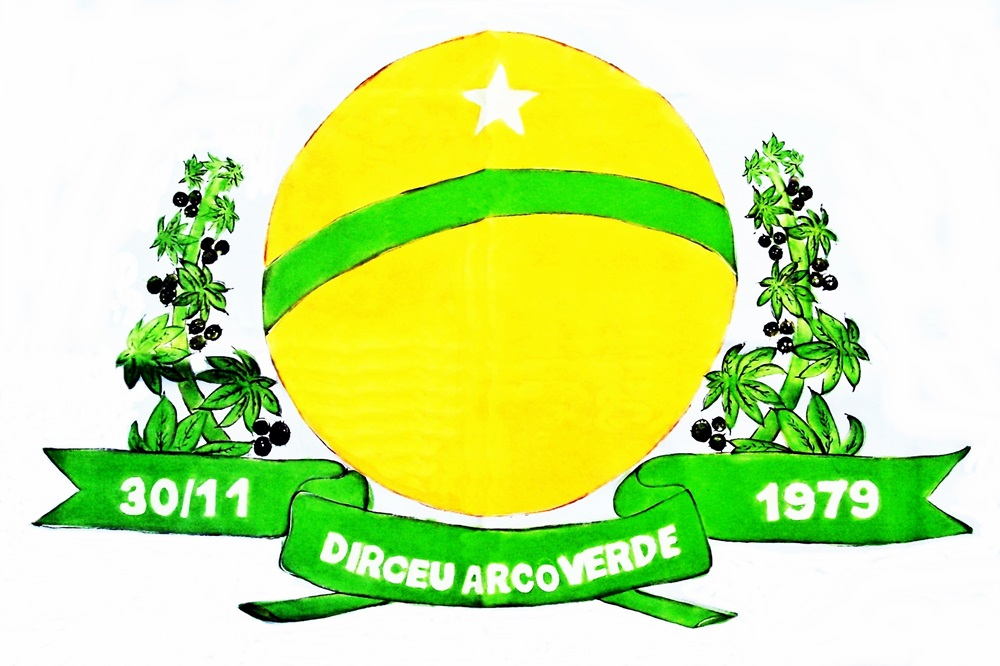
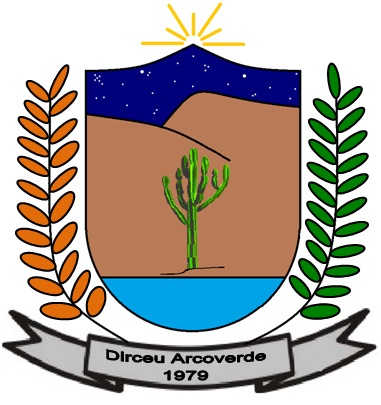
- Flag Coat of arms
- Nickname: Arcoverdino
- Motto: Towards development
- Country: Brazil
- Region: Nordeste
- State: Piauí
- Mesoregion: Sudoeste Piauiense
- Integrated territory: Serra da Capivara

Population (2020)
  - Total: 7,029
- Time zone: UTC−3 (BRT)

Dirceu Arcoverde is a municipality in the state of Piauí in the Northeast region of Brazil.

It is a city of medium development of the State of Piauí semiarid region and is situated in the south of the Serra da Capivara National Park. The population is very small and most of the residents live in the countryside extensions. In the urban region has just over 2,500 inhabitants.

The municipal seat, the city of Dirceu Arcoverde or Bom Jardim - as it is affectionately called by local residents, is at an altitude of 740 meters (2,430 ft) above sea level and is considered one of the urban areas at higher altitude in the state of Piauí.

The weather is warm and seasonal. Summer and fall are humid and rainy seasons, as the winter and spring are dry and no rainfall stations. The average annual temperature is 75.2 °F (24.0 °C) and late spring is the hottest period of the year.

The largest natural and cultural heritage of the city are living landscapes of Serra Brothers and religious chapel of Senhor do Bonfim, with over a century of history.

== Urbanization ==
In general, the city of Dirceu Arcoverde has more than 50% of its neighborhoods with cobblestone paving and street lighting, however, in almost all the city there is no basic sanitation plan.

The city does not have a plan urban planning, however, the irregularity of the streets and avenues still does not compromise the traffic flow, but does not favor the movement of pedestrians or cyclists.

The urban area of the city of Dirceu Arcoverde consists of the following neighborhoods:

- Allotment Almir Paes Ribeiro
- Allotment Altiplano North
- Center
- Dona Cotinha
- Good garden
- Good view
- Lagoa da Onça
- Santa Luzia

== See also ==
- List of municipalities in Piauí
