= 1905 in Brazilian football =

Football in Brazil
- Season: 1905

The 1905 season was the fourth season of competitive football in Brazil.

== Campeonato Paulista ==
Final Standings

Position	Team	Points	Played	Won	Drawn	Lost	For	Against	Difference
1	Paulistano	18	10	8	2	0	20	3	17
2	Germânia	13	10	5	3	2	30	16	14
3	SC Internacional de São Paulo	11	10	4	3	3	15	19	−4
4	São Paulo Athletic	8	10	4	0	6	16	26	−10
5	Mackenzie	7	10	3	1	6	27	27	0
6	AA das Palmeiras	3	10	1	1	8	10	27	−17

Paulistano declared as the Campeonato Paulista champions.

== State championship champions ==
State	Champion
Bahia	Internacional de Cricket
São Paulo	Paulistano
