= 1875 in Brazil =

Events in the year 1875 in Brazil.

== Incumbents ==
- Monarch: Pedro II
- Prime Minister:
  - Viscount of Rio Branco (until 25 June)
  - Duke of Caxias (starting 25 June)

== Events ==
- December 24: Telegraph service begins between Rio de Janeiro and the provinces of Bahia, Pernambuco, and Pará.
