= Tasso Jereissati =

Brazilian politician

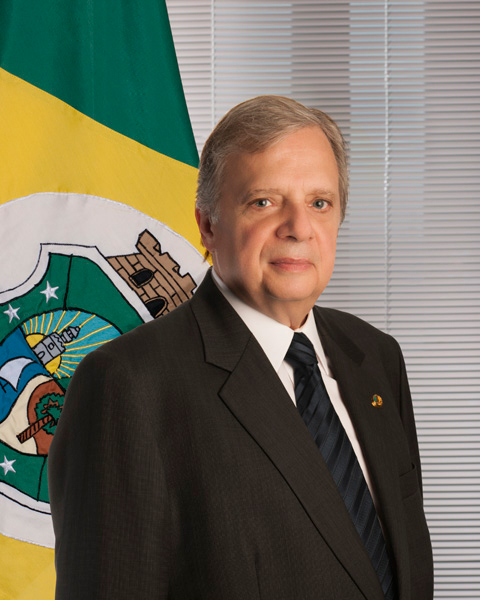

Senator for Ceará
- In office 1 February 2015 – 1 February 2023
- In office 1 February 2003 – 1 February 2011

Governor of Ceará
- In office 1 January 1995 – 6 April 2002
- Vice Governor: Beni Veras
- Preceded by: Rocha Aguiar
- Succeeded by: Beni Veras
- In office 15 March 1987 – 15 March 1991
- Vice Governor: Francisco de Castro
- Preceded by: Gonzaga Mota
- Succeeded by: Ciro Gomes

Personal details
- Born: Tasso Ribeiro Jereissati; 15 December 1948 (age 77) Fortaleza, Ceará, Brazil
- Party: PSDB (1989–present)
- Other political affiliations: PMDB (1986–89)
- Spouse: Renata Queiroz Jereissati
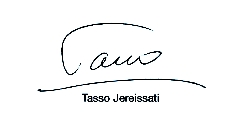
- Signature

Tasso Ribeiro Jereissati (born 15 December 1948) is federal senator of Brazil. He is a former governor of Ceará from 1987 to 1991 and again from 1995 to 2002. He was formerly president of the Teotônio Vilela Institute, a PSDB-affiliated think tank.
