= José Adauto Bezerra =

Brazilian politician (1926–2021)

José Adauto Bezerra, 1975

José Adauto Bezerra (3 July 1926 – 3 April 2021) was a Brazilian politician. He was Governor of Ceará from 1975 to 1978, a member of the Legislative Assembly of Ceará from 1959 to 1979, and a national deputy from 1979 to 1983.

== Biography ==
He died of complications related to COVID-19 in Fortaleza.
