= Antônio Carlos Valadares =

Brazilian politician (born 1943)

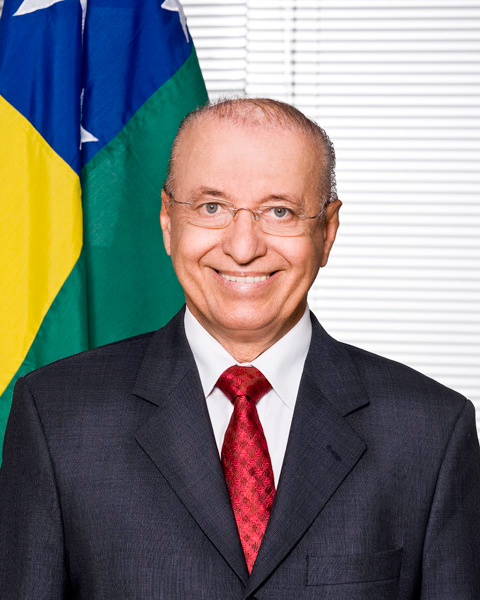

Senator from Sergipe
- Incumbent
- Assumed office February 1, 1995

Governor of Sergipe
- In office March 15, 1987 – March 15, 1991

Deputy from Sergipe
- In office 1979–1983

Personal details
- Born: April 6, 1943 (age 83) Simão Dias, Sergipe
- Party: Brazilian Socialist Party
- Children: Valadares Filho
- Education: Federal University of Sergipe

Antônio Carlos Valadares (born April 6, 1943) is a Brazilian politician. He has represented Sergipe in the Federal Senate since 1995. Previously he was the Governor of Sergipe from 1987 to 1991 and a Deputy from Sergipe from 1979 to 1983. He is a member of the Brazilian Socialist Party.
