= List of governors of Ceará =

Governor of Ceará
- Governor's Flag of the State of Ceará

- Flag of Ceará

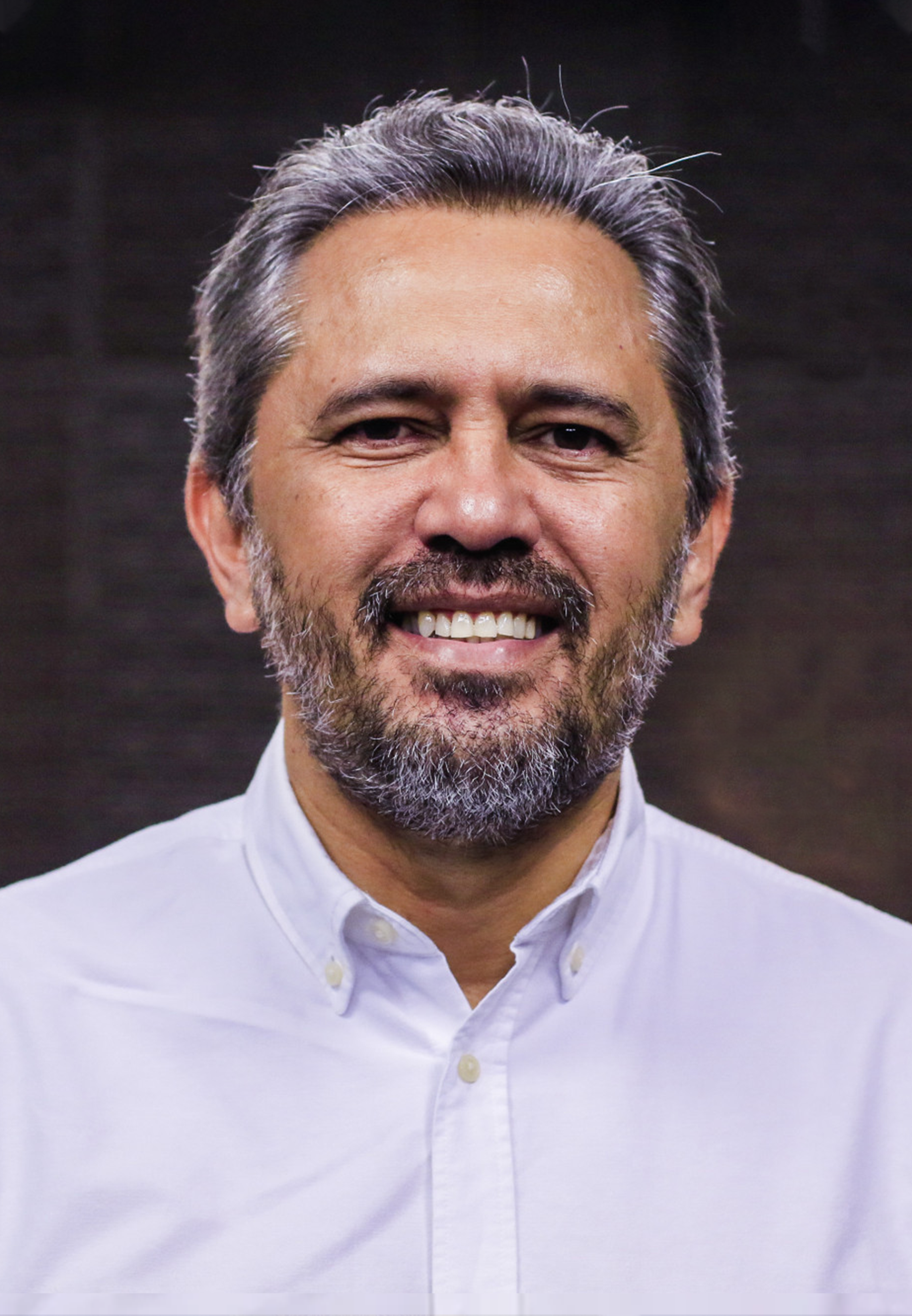
- Incumbent; Elmano de Freitas since 1 Jan 2023
- Residence: Palácio da Abolição
- Precursor: Pedro Taques
- Formation: 1889
- First holder: Luís Antônio Ferraz
- Website: ceara.gov.br

Below is a list of governors of the Brazilian state of Ceará.

No.	Name	Term begins	Terms ends
New Republic (since 1985)
61	Elmano de Freitas	1 Jan 2023	Incumbent
60	Izolda Cela	2 Apr 2022	1 Jan 2023
59	Camilo Santana	1 Jan 2015	2 Apr 2022
58	Cid Gomes	1 Jan 2007	1 Jan 2015
57	Lúcio Alcântara	1 Jan 2003	1 Jan 2007
56	Beni Veras	6 Apr 2002	1 Jan 2003
55	Tasso Jereissati	1 Jan 1995	6 Apr 2002
54	Francisco Aguiar	9 Oct 1994	1 Jan 1995
53	Francisco de Barros	8 Sep 1994	9 Oct 1994
52	Ciro Gomes	15 Mar 1991	8 Sep 1994
51	Tasso Jereissati	15 Mar 1987	15 Mar 1991
Military dictatorship (1964-1985) (43−50)
50	Gonzaga Mota	15 Mar 1983	15 Mar 1987
49	Manuel de Castro	15 Mar 1982	15 Mar 1983
48	Virgílio Távora	15 Mar 1979	15 Mar 1982
47	Waldemar Alcântara	28 Feb 1978	15 Mar 1979
46	José Adauto Bezerra	15 Mar 1975	28 Feb 1978
45	César Cals	25 Mar 1971	15 Mar 1975
44	Plácido Castelo	12 Sep 1966	25 Mar 1971
43	Franklin Chaves	12 Aug 1966	12 Sep 1966
Fourth Brazilian Republic (1945-1964) (30−42)
42	Virgílio Távora	25 Mar 1963	12 Aug 1966
41	Parsifal Barroso	25 Mar 1959	25 Mar 1963
40	Flávio Marcílio	3 Jul 1958	25 Mar 1959
39	Paulo Sarasate	25 Mar 1955	3 Jul 1958
38	Stênio Gomes da Silva	1 Jul 1954	25 Mar 1955
37	Raul Barbosa	31 Jan 1951	1 Jul 1954
36	Faustino de Albuquerque	1 Mar 1947	31 Jan 1951
35	José Feliciano de Ataíde	3 Feb 1947	1 Mar 1947
34	José Machado Lopes	28 Oct 1946	3 Feb 1947
33	Pedro Firmeza	16 Feb 1946	28 Oct 1946
32	Acrísio Moreira da Rocha	21 Jan 1946	16 Feb 1946
31	Tomás Pompeu Filho	10 Jan 1946	21 Jan 1946
30	Benedito Augusto Carvalho dos Santos	28 Oct 1945	10 Jan 1946
Vargas Era (1930-1945)(24−29)
29	Francisco de Meneses Pimentel	25 May 1935	28 Oct 1945
28	Franklin Monteiro Gondim	10 May 1935	25 May 1935
27	Filipe Moreira Lima	5 Sep 1934	10 May 1935
26	Roberto Carneiro de Mendonça	22 Sep 1931	5 Sep 1934
25	João da Silva Leal	13 Jun 1931	22 Sep 1931
24	Manuel Fernandes Távora	8 Oct 1930	13 Jun 1931
First Brazilian Republic (1889-1930) (1−23)
23	José Carlos de Matos Peixoto	12 Jul 1928	8 Oct 1930
22	Eduardo Henrique Girão	19 May 1928	12 Jul 1928
21	José Moreira da Rocha	12 Jul 1924	19 May 1928
20	Ildefonso Albano	12 Jul 1923	12 Jul 1924
19	Justiniano de Serpa	12 Jul 1920	12 Jul 1923
18	João Tomé de Sabóia e Silva	12 Jul 1916	12 Jul 1920
17	Benjamin Liberato Barroso	24 Jun 1914	12 Jul 1916
16	Fernando Setembrino de Carvalho	15 Mar 1914	24 Jun 1914
−	Floro Bartolomeu	10 Mar 1914	15 Mar 1914
15	Marcos Franco Rabelo	14 Jul 1912	14 Mar 1914
14	Belisário Cícero Alexandrino	12 Jul 1912	14 Jul 1912
13	Antônio Frederico de Carvalho Mota	24 Jan 1912	12 Jul 1912
12	Antônio Nogueira Accioli	12 Jul 1908	24 Jan 1912
11	Antônio Nogueira Accioli	12 Jul 1904	12 Jul 1908
10	Pedro Augusto Borges	12 Jul 1900	12 Jul 1904
9	Antônio Nogueira Accioli	12 Jul 1896	12 Jul 1900
8	José Bezerril Fontenelle	27 Aug 1892	12 Jul 1896
7	Antônio Nogueira Accioli	12 Jul 1892	27 Aug 1892
6	Benjamin Liberato Barroso	18 Feb 1892	12 Jul 1892
5	João Nepomuceno de Medeiros Mallet	16 Feb 1892	18 Feb 1892
4	José Clarindo de Queirós	28 Apr 1891	16 Feb 1892
3	Feliciano Antônio Benjamim	6 Apr 1891	28 Apr 1891
2	Benjamin Liberato Barroso	22 Jan 1891	6 Apr 1891
1	Luís Antônio Ferraz	16 Nov 1889	22 Jan 1891

== Living Governors ==
So far, September 7, 2026, the ten living governors of Ceará are, in order of beginning of the first term: Gonzaga Mota, Tasso Jereissati, Ciro Gomes, Chico Aguiar, Lúcio Alcântara, Cid Gomes, Camilo Santana, Izolda Cela, and Elmano de Freitas.

== Links ==
- "Governor's Office - Ceará State Government".
- VARNHAGEN, Francisco Adolpho de. Historia geral do Brazil (v. 2). E. and H. Laemmert, 1857
- pt:Rita Krommen. Mathias Beck and the Cia. Of the West Indies. Fortaleza: UFC, 1994
