= List of foreign-born Brazilian politicians =

This is a list of Brazilian politicians who were born outside.

== List ==
Name	Country/Place of Birth	Party (most recent)	Serving since	Offices	Notes
Camilo Capiberibe	Chile	Brazilian Socialist Party	2007	Governor of Amapá (2011–2015); Federal Deputy for Amapá (2019–2023); State Deputy of Amapá (2007–2011)	
Rodrigo Maia	Chile	Brazilian Social Democracy Party	1999	President of the Chamber of Deputies (2016–2021); Federal Deputy for Rio de Janeiro (1999–2023); National President of Democrats (2007–2011)	
Carlos Amastha	Colombia	Brazilian Socialist Party	2013	Mayor of Palmas, Tocantins (2013–2018)	
Antônio Furlan	Costa Rica	Brazilian Democratic Movement	2014	Mayor of Macapá, Amapá (2021–present); State Deputy of Amapá (2014–2021)	
Martim Francisco Ribeiro de Andrada	France	Liberal Party	1853	President of the Chamber of Deputies (1842–1843, 1882); Minister of Justice (1866–1868); Minister of Foreign Affairs (1866); General Deputy for São Paulo (1853–1856, 1861–1868)	
José Bonifácio, the Younger	France	Liberal Party	1860	Minister of the Brazilian Navy (1862); Senator for São Paulo (1879–1886)	
Luís Vianna Filho	France	Brazilian Democratic Movement	1935	President of the Federal Senate (1979–1981); Governor of Bahia (1967–1971); Minister of State Head of the Civilian House of the Presidency of the Republic (1964–1967); Minister of Justice and Interior Affairs (1965, 1966); Senator for Bahia (1975–1990); Federal Deputy for Bahia (1935–1967)	
Paulino José Soares de Sousa, Viscount of Uruguay	France	Conservative Party	1835	Governor of Rio de Janeiro (1836); Minister of Justice (1840–1843); Minister of Foreign Affairs (1843–1844, 1849–1853); Senator for Rio de Janeiro (1849–1866); General Deputy for Rio de Janeiro (1837–1841, 1843–1844, 1848); Provincial Deputy of Rio de Janeiro (1835–1837)	
Jorge Tibiriçá	France	Paulista Republican Party	1890	Governor of São Paulo (1890–1891, 1904–1908)	
Guido Mantega	Italy	Workers' Party	2003	Minister of Finance (2006–2015); Minister of Planning, Budget and Management (2003–2004)	
Vittorio Medioli	Italy	Liberal Party	1991	Mayor of Betim, Minas Gerais (2017–2024); Federal Deputy for Minas Gerais (1991–2007)	
Susumo Itimura	Japan	Brazilian Social Democracy Party	1964	Mayor of Uraí, Paraná (1964–1969, 1973–1977, 1996–2000, 2004–2011)	
Yugi Yamada	Japan	Progressive Republican Party	2012	Mayor of Janaúba, Minas Gerais (2012–2016)	
Luís Manuel Agner	Kingdom of Württemberg	Liberal Party	1865	State Deputy of Paraná (1988–1989)	
Issam Fares	Lebanon	Brazilian Democratic Movement	1997	Mayor of Três Lagoas, Mato Grosso do Sul (1997–2004)	
Walid Ali Hamid	Lebanon	Social Democratic Party	2009	Mayor of Mairiporã, São Paulo	
Mohamed Ali Hamze	Lebanon	Brazilian Democratic Movement	1989	Mayor of Cambará, Paraná (1989–1992, 1997–2004); State Deputy of Paraná (2007–2008)	
Mohsen Hojeije	Lebanon	Brazilian Labour Party	2009	Mayor of Juquiá, São Paulo (2009–2016)	
Pedro Tobias	Lebanon	Brazilian Social Democracy Party	1999	State Deputy of São Paulo (1999–2019)	
Caetano Pinto de Miranda Montenegro	Portugal	None	1796	Governor of Pernambuco (1804–1817); General-Captain of Mato Grosso (1796–1803); Minister of Justice (1822, 1822–1823); Minister of Finance (1822)	
José Gomes Temporão	Portugal	Brazilian Socialist Party	2007	Minister of Health (2007–2011)	
Nicolau Pereira de Campos Vergueiro	Portugal	Liberal Party	1813	Regent of the Empire of Brazil (1831); Minister of Justice (1847); Minister of Finance (1832); Senator for Minas Gerais (1828–1859); General Deputy for São Paulo (1826–1828)	
José Graziano	United States	None	2003	Extraordinary Minister for Food Security (2003–2004)	
