= Orestes Quércia =

Brazilian politician (1938–2010)

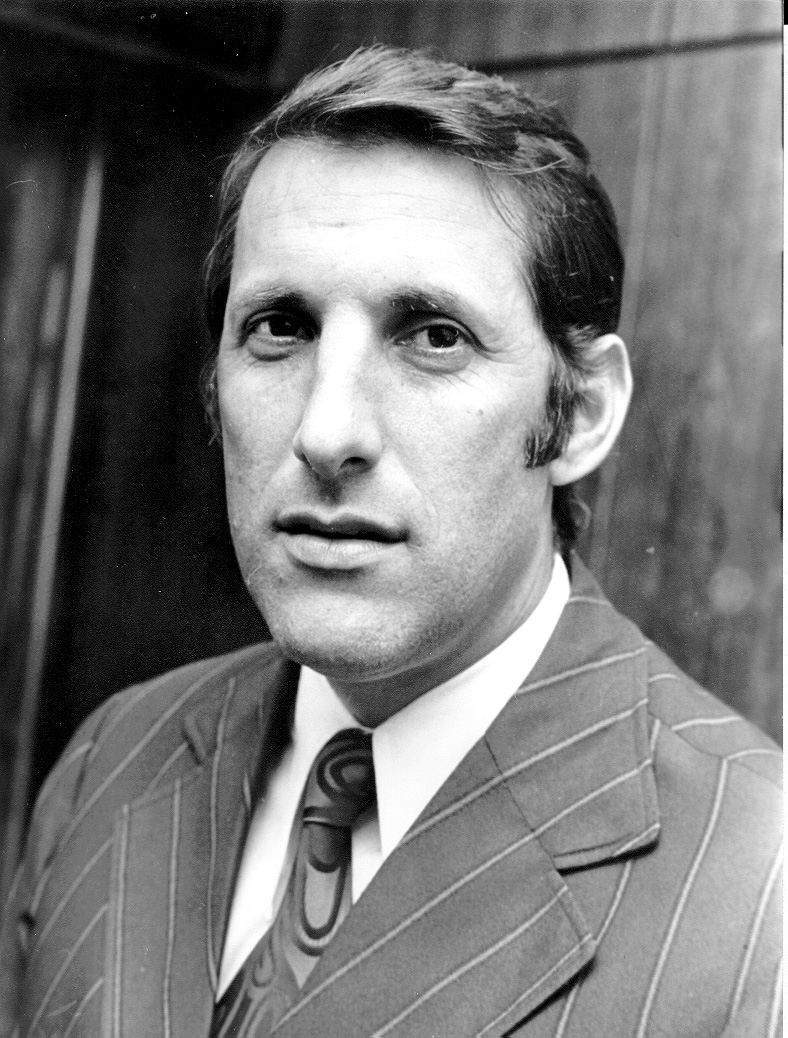

28th Governor of São Paulo
- In office 15 March 1987 – 15 March 1991
- Vice Governor: Almino Afonso
- Preceded by: Franco Montoro
- Succeeded by: Luiz Antônio Fleury

19th Vice Governor of São Paulo
- In office 15 March 1983 – 30 March 1986
- Governor: Franco Montoro
- Preceded by: José Maria Marin
- Succeeded by: Aloysio Nunes

Senator for São Paulo
- In office 1 February 1975 – 1 February 1983

44th Mayor of Campinas
- In office 1 January 1969 – 1 January 1973
- Preceded by: Ruy Hellmeister Novais
- Succeeded by: Lauro Péricles Gonçalves

State Deputy of São Paulo
- In office 1 February 1967 – 1 January 1969

Councillor of Campinas
- In office 1 January 1963 – 1 January 1967

Personal details
- Born: August 18, 1938 Pedregulho, São Paulo, Brazil
- Died: December 24, 2010 (aged 72) São Paulo, São Paulo, Brazil
- Cause of death: Prostate cancer
- Resting place: Morumbi Cemetery, São Paulo
- Party: PMDB
- Spouse: Alaíde Barbosa Ulson Quércia (m. 1985)
- Children: 4
- Education: Pontifical Catholic University of Campinas
- Occupation: Politician

Orestes Quércia (Brazilian Portuguese pronunciation: [oˈrɛstʃis ˈkwɛɾsjɐ]; 18 August 1938 – 24 December 2010) was a Brazilian politician who served as the 28th governor of São Paulo State.

== Early life and education ==
The son of Octavio Quércia and Isaura Roque Quércia, Orestes Quércia lived in Pedregulho and moved to Campinas with his family when still a teenager. Elected the vice-president of the student council in his high school, in his senior year he joined as a reporter to the local newspaper Diário do Povo, and got accepted at Pontifícia Universidade Católica de Campinas (PUCC) in its law school program. At university, he was the director of the newspaper Centro Acadêmico 16 de Abril and he founded the Universidade de Cultura Popular (University of Popular Culture) linked to the Pontifícia Universidade Católica de Campinas (PUCC). From 1959 to 1963 Quércia was the radio announcer for two radios: Rádio Cultura and Rádio Brasil, he also worked at the newspaper Jornal de Campinas which was a branch of Última Hora newspaper. Subsequently, he became the president of the press association of Campinas and also worked as a production assistant at the Highways department.

== Political career ==
Orestes Quércia began his political career when was elected alderman of Campinas in the PL (Liberator Party) in 1962. A few years after the multiparty system ended, and he chose the MDB (Brazilian Democratic Movement) and in this party was elected state representative in 1966 and mayor of Campinas in 1968.

After electing his successor in 1972, Quércia began organizing directories of his party (MDB) everywhere in the São Paulo state and in the party convention as a candidate for the Senate of Brazil he won the contest with over Lino de Matos e Samir Achôa. In 1974, he was elected senator after a tied competition with Carvalho Pinto that was appointed as favorite running for re-election with the ARENA (National Renewal Alliance Party). Quércia was very critical about the economic policy during the government of Ernesto Geisel in 1977 and during this period was reported the occurrence of corruption during his period as a mayor of Campinas, but the claims were never not proven. The return of multiparty politics made him join to the PMDB party in 1980 and declared himself a candidate to succeed the governor Paulo Maluf in February 1981, a position he maintained until a last-minute deal that made him candidate to vice governor, being Franco Montoro the governor candidate.

In 1982 he was elected vice governor of São Paulo, but differently from the image of party unity shown during the campaign, was constant against PMDB politicians linked to the governor, he did not succeed but tried to prevent the Congressman Mário Covas to be the mayor of São Paulo in 1983 and the election of Senator Fernando Henrique Cardoso to the presidency of the state directory of the PMDB that same year. It was adherent to the Diretas Já and the winning campaign of Tancredo Neves toward the presidency in 1985, the year he married the doctor Alaíde Cristina Barbosa Ulson. At this moment he was on his way to the candidacy for governor in 1986.

After the victory of former President Jânio Quadros (Brazilian Labour Party-PTB) over Fernando Henrique Cardoso in November of that year, Orestes Quércia saw his popularity in the party increase with the movement called "quercismo" which guaranteed its nomination as candidate for governor despite internal dissidence. Candidate in an election polarized initially between deputy Paulo Maluf and the businessman Antônio de Morais Ermírio and also had the participation of the deputy Eduardo Suplicy, the clash began with low scores in surveys of opinion, however he kept his candidacy and ultimately was victorious. His government was responsible for a big growth economical of the state and for privatization of VASP in 1990, the year in which elected Luiz Antonio Fleury Filho as his successor.

== Accusations of corruption ==
Quercia's political career was marked by scandals and allegations of corruption and illicit enrichment, both in the city of Campinas and in government of São Paulo. Nevertheless, he never received a final conviction.

Quercia was accused of stealing material from the Roads Department (DER) to build fences on his farm in Pedregulho-SP, of importing electronic equipment without competitive bidding of Israel, overbillings works of the subway, and irregularities in the privatization of VASP. In 1991, the then governor of Parana, Roberto Requiao, a party rival of Quercia, created the service "Dial Quercia for Corruption", a number of phone in which the Brazilians could call to report him. Later, the two opponents became political allies. This year, Quercia supported the candidacy of Requião for the presidency. When he applied for senator in 2010, declared to the Electoral Justice that his assets totaled $117 million. Entrepreneur of branches and communication business, was the owner of Sol Investment Group – New radio controller Brazil FM, DCI's financial newspaper, affiliated stations of the SBT (TVB TVB Campinas and Santos), the Shopping Jaragua and several farms.

== Elections ==
Since Quercia left the government of São Paulo in 1991, failed to win any other election- was the PMDB candidate for president in 1994, the state government in 1998/2006 and the Senate in 2002 (would be a candidate for the Senate again in 2010, but renounced application due to the treatment of prostate cancer).

Quércia placed 4th in the 1994 presidential election with 2,773,793 votes (4.4%), behind the victorious Fernando Henrique Cardoso of the PSDB (54.3%), Luiz Inácio Lula da Silva of the PT (27%), and Enéas Carneiro of the PRONA (7.4%).

Quércia came 5th in the 1st round of the 1998 São Paulo gubernatorial election with 714,097 votes (4.3%). Paulo Maluf and Mário Covas advanced to the runoff, which was won by the latter.

He was the 3rd place in the 2002 São Paulo senatorial election with 5,550,803 votes (15.8%). Aloizio Mercadante (PT) and Romeu Tuma (PFL) were elected

He again ran for governor of São Paulo in the 2006 election, coming in 3rd with 977,695 votes (4.57%), behind the victorious José Serra (PSDB), who received 12,381,038 votes (57.93%) and Sen. PT Aloizio Mercadante, who got 6,771,582 votes (31.68%).

After having supported the victorious campaign Gilberto Kassab (DEM) for mayor of São Paulo in 2008, Quércia was approached by several political leaders to have his support in the 2010 elections as well. the PSDB, Quercia's party and PMDB entered into partnership supported by José Serra, Geraldo Alckmin and Aloysio Nunes. The PT, on the other hand, relied on the movement of President Luiz Inácio Lula da Silva to hold PMDB ruling as vice president. To strengthen the PMDB in São Paulo, Quércia toured many places in the interior getting support from other parties leaders to unite for the election of 2010. But due to a prostate cancer, he rejected the nomination to the São Paulo Senate on September 6, 2010.

== Entrepreneur ==
Quercia invested in properties and in the communication business – was the owner of Sol Investment Group, which owns and control Brazil FM Radio Nova, the newspaper Financial DCI, two regional broadcasters, TVB Campinas (from February, an affiliate of Rede Record) and TVB Santos (from March, affiliate Rede Bandeirantes), the Shopping Jaragua and several farms. His assets were valued at over $117 million.

== Personal life and death ==
Quércia was married to Alaíde Barbosa Ulson Quércia since 1985. The couple had four children.

He died from prostate canceron 24 December 2010, aged 72, according to the Syrian-Lebanese Hospital in São Paulo. He had treated the cancer in 1990, but the tumor recurred, prompting him to give up nomination to the Senate. Quércia's funeral was held the following day at the Bandeirantes Palace in São Paulo, and he was buried at the Morumbi Cemetery.

Political offices
Preceded by Franco Montoro	28th Governor of São Paulo; 1987–1991	Succeeded by Luiz Antônio Fleury
Preceded by José Maria Marin	29th Vice Governor of São Paulo; 1983–1986	Succeeded by Aloysio Nunes
Preceded by Ruy Hellmeister Novais	44th Mayor of Campinas; 1969–1973	Succeeded by Lauro Péricles Gonçalves
Party political offices
Preceded by Ulysses Guimarães	PMDB nominee for President of Brazil; 1994	Succeeded by Henrique Meirelles
