= 2014 Amapá general election =

2014 Amapá gubernatorial election
- 5 October 2014; 26 October 2014 (runoff)
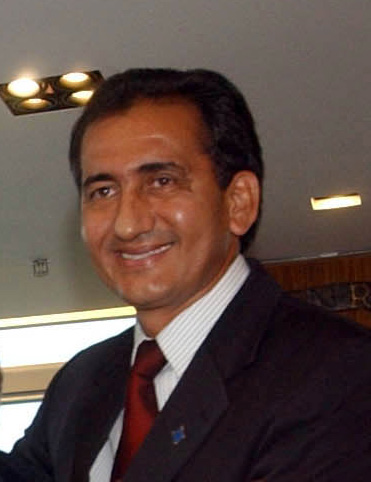

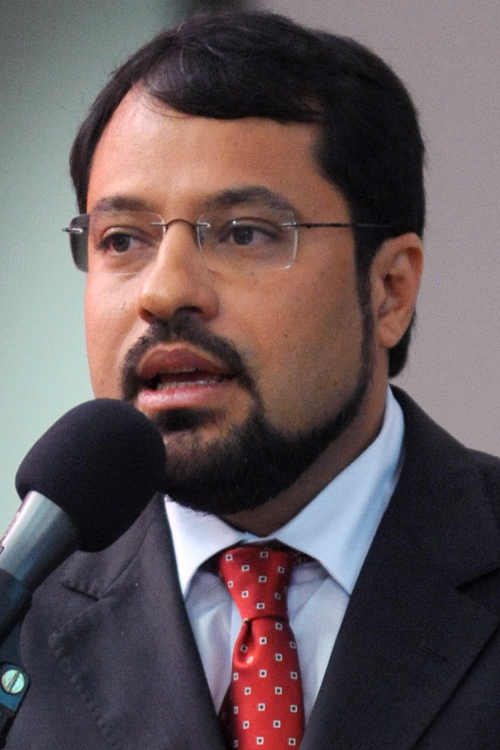

Nominee	Waldez	Camilo Capiberibe
Party	PDT	PSB
Running mate	Papaléo Paes	Rinaldo Martins
Popular vote	161,550 (1st); 220,256 (1st)	105,445 (2nd); 143,311 (2nd)
Percentage	42.18% (1st); 60.58% (1st)	27.53% (2nd); 39.42% (2nd)
Nominee	Lucas Barreto	Bruno Mineiro	Jorge Amanajás
Party	PSD	PTdoB	PPS
Running mate	Wagner Gomes	Aline Gurgel	Daiana Ramos
Popular vote	53,079 (3rd)	30,135 (4th)	27,045 (5th)
Percentage	13.86% (3rd)	7.87% (4th)	7.06% (5th)
Governor before election
Camilo Capiberibe
PSB
Elected Governor
TBD

The Amapá gubernatorial election was held on 5 October 2014 to elect the next governor of the state of Amapá. Since no candidate received more than 50% of the vote, a second-round runoff election was held on 26 October. Governor Camilo Capiberibe ran for a second term and was forced into a runoff with former Governor Waldez Góes.

== Candidates ==
- Waldez 12 (PDT) - former Governor of Amapá (elected in 2002, 2006)
  - Papaléo Paes 12 (PP) - doctor; former Senator (2003–2011)
- Genival Cruz 16 (PSTU) - bus driver; union leader
  - Professor Wilamo 16 (PSTU) - high school teacher
- Décio Gomes 21 (PCB) - business director
  - Paulo Gaia 21 (PCB) - high school teacher
- Jorge Amanajás 23 (PPS) - former State Deputy (elected in 1998, 2002, 2006)
  - Daiana Ramos 23 (PMN) - President, Associação Universidade de Samba Boêmios do Laguinho
- Camilo Capiberibe 40 (PSB) - incumbent Governor (elected in 2010); former State Deputy (elected in 2006)
  - Rinaldo Martins 40 (PSOL) - doctor
- Lucas Barreto 55 (PSD) - Macapá Councillor (elected in 2012); former State Deputy (elected in 1990, 1994, 1998, 2002)
  - Wagner Gomes 55 (SD) - lawyer
- Bruno Mineiro 70 (PTdoB) - State Deputy (elected in 2010)
  - Aline Gurgel 70 (PR) - Macapá Councillor (elected in 2012)

=== Coalitions ===
Candidate	Running mate	Coalition
Waldez; PDT	Papaleo Paes; PP	"A Força do Povo" (PDT, PP, PMDB)
Camilo Capiberibe; PSB	Rinaldo Martins; PSOL	"Frente Popular a Favor Do Amapá" (PSB, PSOL, PT, PCdoB)
Lucas Barreto; PSD	Wagner Gomes; SD	"Juntos Pelo Desenvolvimento Pela Paz e Pela Vida" (PSD, SD, DEM, PSDB)
Bruno Mineiro; PTdoB	Aline Gurgel; PR	"Unidos Pelo Amapá Que Queremos" (PTdoB, PR, PRB, PROS, PEN, PV, PHS, PSDC, PTN)
Jorge Amanajas; PPS	Daiana Ramos; PMN	"O Futuro Começa Agora" (PPS, PMN, PSC, PRTB, PTC, PRP, PPL, PTB)
Genival Cruz; PSTU	Professor Wilamo; PSTU	-
Décio Gomes; PCB	Paulo Gaia; PCB	-

== Results ==
Amapá gubernatorial election, 2014 (first round)
Party	Candidate	Votes	%	±%
PDT	Waldez	161,550	40.62	
PSB	Camilo Capiberibe (incumbent)	105,445	26.51	
PSD	Lucas Barreto	53,079	13.35	
PTdoB	Bruno Mineiro	30,135	7.57	
PPS	Jorge Amanajas	27,045	6.80	
PSTU	Genival Cruz	5,306	1.33	
PCB	Décio Gomes	455	0.11	
Total formal votes		383,015	96.31	
Turnout		397,693		

Amapá gubernatorial election, 2014 (second round)
Party	Candidate	Votes	%	±%
PDT	Waldez	220,256	60.58%	
PSB	Camilo Capiberibe (incumbent)	143,311	39.42%	
Majority		76,945	21.16%	
PDT gain from PSB		Swing		
