= Furlan (surname) =

Furlan is an Italian surname. Notable people with the surname include:

- Alan Furlan (1920–1997), American actor
- Alessio Furlan (born 1976), Italian boxer
- Angelo Furlan (born 1977), Argentine cyclist
- Annamaria Furlan (born 1958), Italian trade unionist
- Antônio Furlan (born 1973), Brazilian politician
- Boris Furlan (1894–1957), Slovenian jurist, philosopher of law, translator and politician
- Brittany Furlan (born 1986), American comedian and internet personality
- Bruno Furlan (born 1992), Brazilian footballer
- Federico Furlan (born 1990), Italian footballer
- Gabriel Furlán (born 1964), Argentine racing driver
- Giorgio Furlan (born 1966), Italian cyclist
- Jean-Marc Furlan (born 1957), French footballer and manager
- Jovani Furlan, Brazilian ballet dancer
- Luis Furlán (born 1948), Guatemalan electrical engineer
- Mira Furlan (1955–2021), Croatian actress and singer
- Rayssa Furlan (born 1987), Brazilian politician
- Renzo Furlan (born 1970), Italian tennis player
- Sergio Furlan (born 1940), Italian sailor
