= Luciana Gurgel =

Brazilian politician (born 1982)

- Gurgel in 2026

Vice Governor-elect of Amapá
- Assuming office 6 January 2027
- Governor: Antônio Furlan
- Succeeding: Teles Junior

Member of the Legislative Assembly of the State of Amapá
- In office 1 January 2015 – 1 January 2023

Personal details
- Born: 22 October 1982 (age 43)
- Party: Liberal Party (since 2018)
- Spouse: Vinícius Gurgel

Luciana Araujo Góes Gurgel (born 22 October 1982) is a Brazilian politician. From 2015 to 2023, she was a member of the Legislative Assembly of the State of Amapá. From 2025 to 2026, she served as secretary of social assistance of Macapá. She is married to Vinícius Gurgel.
