= List of current state governors in Brazil =

In Brazil, the governors are the chief executives of the states of Brazil. The list below contains are the elected governors for the 2023-2027 term.

== Map ==
A map of Brazil showing the political parties of state governors elected in 2022. Each state is colored according to the political party its respective governor belongs to.

== Current governors ==
State	Governor	Portrait	Party	Vice Governor	Party
Acre list	Mailza Gomes		PP	Vacant	Vacant
Alagoas list	Paulo Dantas		MDB	Ronaldo Lessa	PDT
Amapá list	Clécio Luís		UNIÃO	Teles Junior	PDT
Amazonas list	Roberto Cidade		UNIÃO	Serafim Corrêa	PSB
Bahia list	Jerônimo Rodrigues		PT	Geraldo Júnior	MDB
Ceará list	Elmano de Freitas		PT	Jade Romero	PT
Distrito Federal list	Celina Leão		PP	Vacant	Vacant
Espírito Santo list	Ricardo Ferraço		MDB	Vacant	Vacant
Goiás list	Daniel Vilela		MDB	Vacant	Vacant
Maranhão list	Carlos Brandão		MDB	Felipe Camarão	PT
Mato Grosso list	Otaviano Pivetta		Republicanos	Vacant	Vacant
Mato Grosso do Sul list	Eduardo Riedel		PP	José Carlos Barbosa	Republicanos
Minas Gerais list	Mateus Simões		PSD	Vacant	Vacant
Pará list	Hana Ghassan		MDB	Vacant	Vacant
Paraíba list	Lucas Ribeiro		PP	Vacant	Vacant
Paraná list	Ratinho Júnior		PSD	Darci Piana	PSD
Pernambuco list	Raquel Lyra		PSD	Priscila Krause	PSD
Piauí list	Rafael Fonteles		PT	Themístocles Filho	MDB
Rio de Janeiro list	Ricardo Couto (acting)		Independent	Vacant	Vacant
Rio Grande do Norte list	Fátima Bezerra		PT	Walter Alves	MDB
Rio Grande do Sul list	Eduardo Leite		PSD	Gabriel Souza	MDB
Rondônia list	Marcos Rocha		PSD	Sérgio Gonçalves	UNIÃO
Roraima list	Soldado Sampaio		Republicanos	Vacant	Vacant
São Paulo list	Tarcísio de Freitas		Republicanos	Felicio Ramuth	MDB
Santa Catarina list	Jorginho Mello		PL	Marilisa Boehm	PL
Sergipe list	Fábio Mitidieri		PSD	Zezinho Sobral	PSB
Tocantins list	Wanderlei Barbosa		Republicanos	Laurez Moreira	PSD
