= Politics of Amapá =

The politics of Amapá encompasses the structures, institutions, and processes through which political power is exercised in the Brazilian state of Amapá. The state is governed by three branches of government: the Executive, led by the governor; the Legislative, exercised by the Legislative Assembly of Amapá; and the Judiciary, represented by the state’s Court of Justice and other judicial authorities. In addition to representative democracy, the political system allows for direct participation by the electorate through mechanisms such as referendums and popular initiatives.

== History ==
The political history of Amapá begins with the dismemberment of Pará in 1943, with its transformation into a Federal Territory. Janary Nunes was appointed by President Getúlio Vargas to become the first governor. With the Brazilian Constitution of 1988, Amapá became a state, and in addition to the executive branch, legislative and judicial powers were established.

== Constitution of Amapá ==
The Constitution of the State of Amapá was promulgated on December 20, 1991, through the State Constituent Assembly, with the addition of changes resulting from subsequent constitutional amendments.

== Governmental structure ==
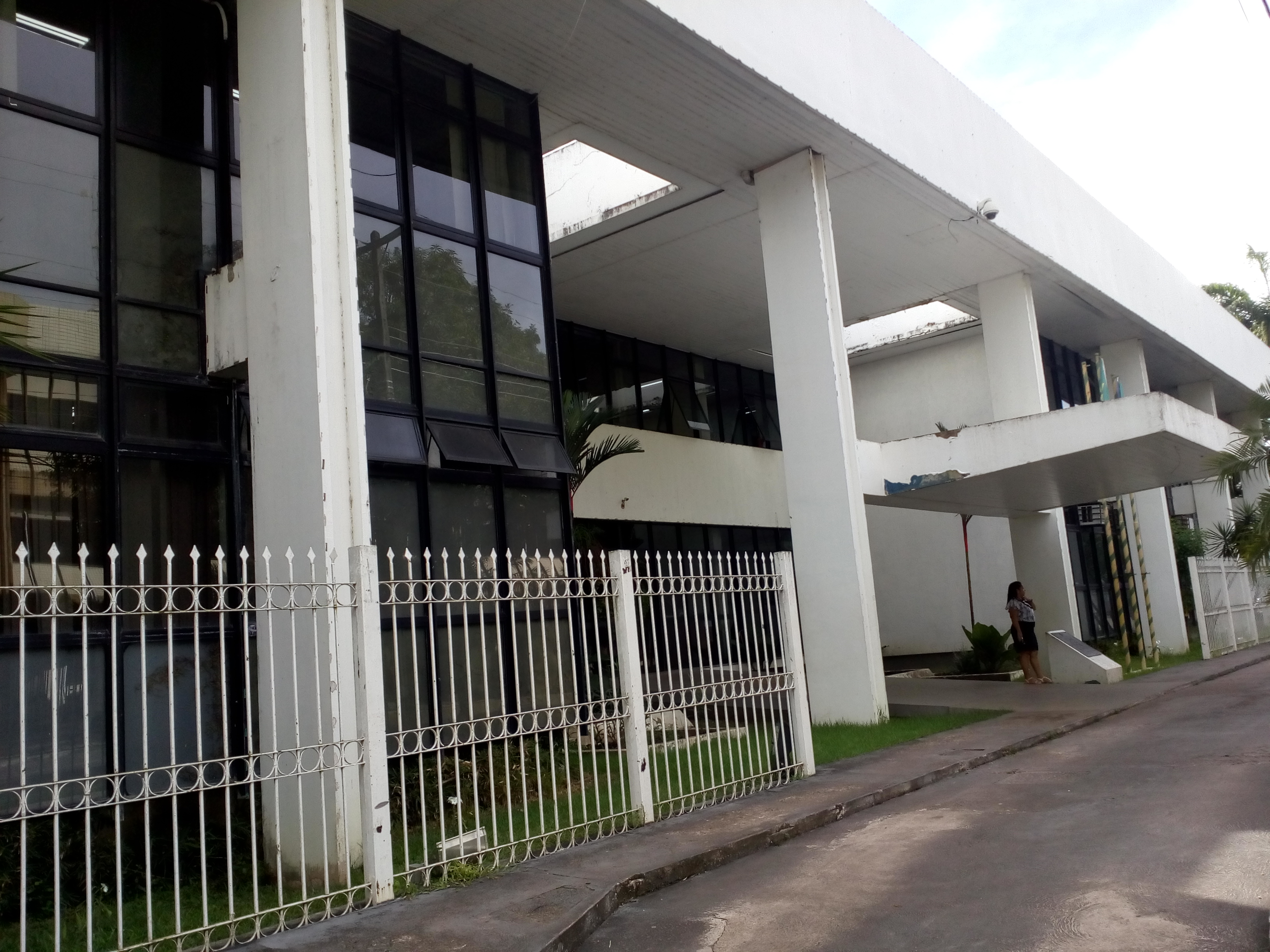
Palace of the North (Brazilian Portuguese: Palácio do Setentrião), seat of the Government of Amapá, Macapá.

=== Executive ===
The executive power in Amapá is centralized in the state governor, who is elected by universal suffrage and direct and secret ballot by the population for terms of up to four years, and may be re-elected for one more term. Its first headquarters was the Intervention Office of Macapá (current Joaquim Caetano da Silva Museum) from 1943 until 1976, when it was replaced by the first building of the Palácio do Setentrião, built by Governor General Ivonhé Martins, inaugurated on January 25, 1976. As of 2026 it houses the Public Prosecutor's Office of the State of Amapá, and the official headquarters of the Amapá government was inaugurated next door in March 1984, by Governor Annibal Barcellos.

Currently, the governor of Amapá is Waldez Góes, who took office on January 1, 2015, succeeding Camilo Capiberibe, who was defeated in the second round of the 2014 elections, winning with 60.58% of the vote.

There is also the vice-governor, who replaces the governor if the latter resigns, is removed from power, or needs to step down from office temporarily. Currently, the position is held by Papaléo Paes.

=== Legislative ===
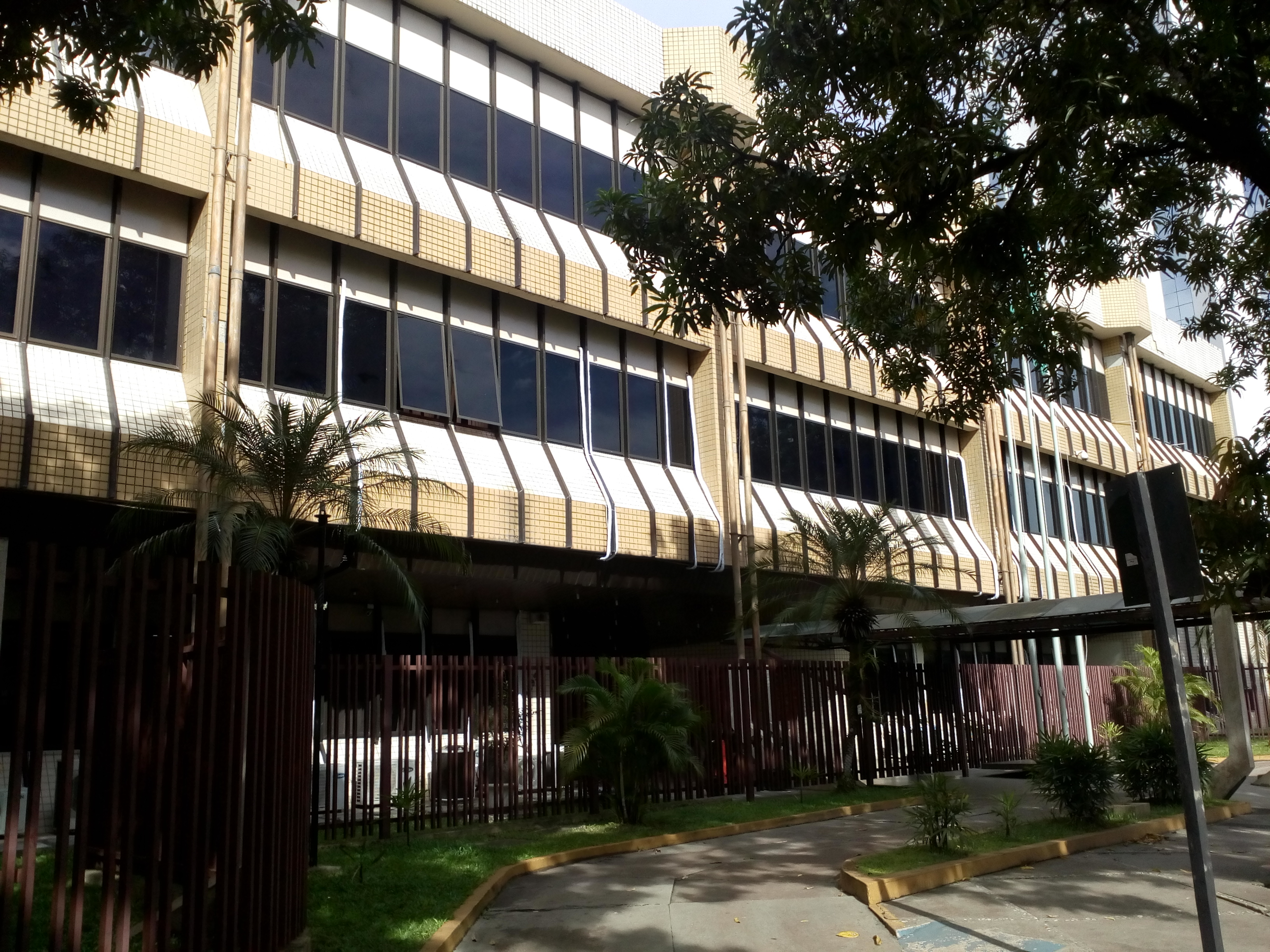
The Court of Justice of Amapá, Macapá.

The state's legislative power is unicameral, consisting of the Legislative Assembly of Amapá, located in the center of Macapá. It is composed of 24 deputies, who are elected every 4 years. In the National Congress, Amapá is represented by 3 senators and 8 federal deputies.

=== Judiciary ===
Currently, the largest court in the Amapá State Judiciary is the Court of Justice of the State of Amapá, located in the center of Macapá, in the eastern part of the capital.

== Voters and parties ==
Macapá is the city with the largest number of voters, with 289,811. Next are Santana, with 76,040 voters, Laranjal do Jari (28,621 voters), Oiapoque (19,013 voters), and Mazagão, Porto Grande, and Vitória do Jari, with 14,800, 13,300, and 9,700 voters, respectively. The municipality with the fewest voters is Pracuúba, with 3,200.

All 35 Brazilian political parties have representation in the state. According to information released by the Superior Electoral Court (TSE), based on data from April 2018, the political party with the largest number of members in Amapá is the Socialism and Liberty Party (PSOL), with 10,583 members, followed by the Democratic Labour Party (PDT), with 10,204 members, and the Brazilian Social Democracy Party (PSDB), with 7,589 members.

The five largest parties in the state, by number of members, are the Workers' Party (PT), with 7,045 members; and the Democrats (DEM), with 6,547 members. According to the Superior Electoral Court, the New Party (NOVO) and the Free Fatherland Party (PPL) are the political parties with the least representation in the state, with 17 and 219 members, respectively.

== See also ==
- Politics of Brazil
- List of governors of Amapá
