= Cornelis de Hooghe =

Dutch engraver (1541–1583)

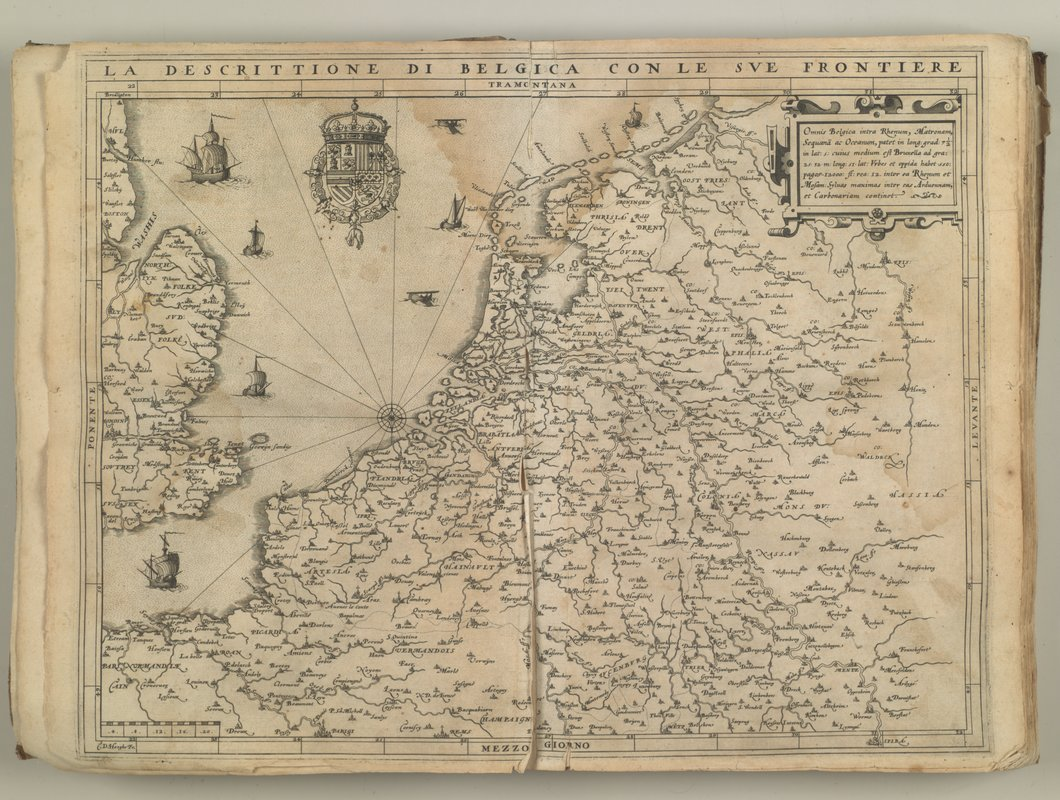
Map of the Netherlands - copper plate by Cornelis de Hooghe for Ludovico Guicciardini's description of the low countries

Cornelis de Hooghe (1541, in The Hague – 1583, in The Hague) was a 16th-century engraver and mapmaker from the Northern Netherlands.

== Family background ==
Cornelis de Hooghe, born in 1541 in The Hague (the Netherlands) as a bastard of Charles V, after this emperor's visit to the town in the summer of 1540. As De Hooghe's later friends and co-conspirators were to be found in the upper-class Delft families, it can safely be assumed that his mother was one of the daughters of Cornelis Arendsz. van der Hooch and Petronella van Persijn, wealthy and influential locals of both The Hague and Delft with close ties to the Habsburg government. This family also used names like Verhooch, De Hoogh or De Hooghe and owned a farm in the vicinity of Delft, bearing the name De Hooght. The exaggerated mention in his “Hollandia-map” (1565) of the rather unimportant Persijn manor (Huys te Persijn), that was situated just north of The Hague, underlines his descent from this family.

== Cartographer career ==
De Hooghe was a pupil of Philip Galle and received his education as an engraver when Galle still lived in Haarlem. "Cornelius Hogius" (as he signed his Norfolk map in 1574) already worked for himself at the court of Margareth of Parme (his halfsister and also a bastard of Charles V) when Galle moved to Antwerp. He produced two maps for Margareth's court. Firstly he made a copy of Forlani's map “La vera descrittione della Gallia Belgica”, that by itself is assumed being a smaller copy of a wall-map by Van Deventer that now has been lost. In De Hooghe's copy he added to Forlani's map the borders of "Belgica" exactly as they were statued in 1559 by the peace treaty of Cateau-Cambrésis. He therefore modified the original title of the map into “La Descrittione di Belgica con le sue frontiere” and added Philip IInd's blason to the copy of Forlani. His second known work was his "Hollandia-map", dated 1565 and signed by his monogram C.D.H. This map is considered being his masterpiece and was ornamented by a lavish moresquen border and the blasons of both king Philip II of Spain and of William of Orange (the Silent), by that time stadholder of Holland. The third known work were the illustrations that he made for captain Francesco de Marchi, Margareth's most trusted aid, for his book on the construction and lay-out of fortifications. Several projects were severely hampered by the Antwerp uprising of 1566, after which William of Orange fled to Germany. This made the "Hollandia-map", fraternally bearing both blasons of Philip II and of William of Orange, obsolete.

On 4 May 1567, a few days after Margaretha settled herself and her court in Antwerp for a few months in order to restore calm in this town, De Hooghe sold his "Hollandia-map" to the famous Antwerp printer Plantin. In 1567 his "Belgica-map appeared in the first edition of Ludovico Guicciardini's "Descrittione di tutti i Paesi Bassi". It is often assumed that this map was especially made for this book, but the differences in size show that De Hooghe just sold a slightly modified and signed reprint of these maps to the author. It is safer to assume that only the second version of this map was made for Guicciardini. The first unsigned version of this map must be dated prior to 1567, most probably rather close to the year 1559 of the peace of Cateau-Cambrésis and was made solely for use at the court. None of the existing first version maps that survived bears any sign of book binding, nor were they cut off in order to fit in Guicciardini's book.

At the end of 1567 Margareth left for Italy after being replaced by the Duke of Alva. By this event, Cornelis lost his job as a court engraver and left for London. He was mentioned on the 1567 Archbishop Grindal's list of religious refugees "Catalogus corum qui ex ditione Philippi Hispaniarum Regis Ecclesiae Belgico-Germanicae Londinensi subsunt".

On 4 May 1568, Cornelis is noticed in London again, obtaining a privilege of Queen Elisabeth I. But in January 1569 he is mentioned back in Antwerp, obtaining his revenues for his "Hollandia-map" at the Plantin printing office. 1569 was also the year in which De Hooghe together with the 18 years old Clement Perret, finished a calligraphical example book, the "Excercitatio", which obtained a privilege and was sold by Plantin's office. The lavish borders of the Excercitatio seems to find their origin in the fortification book of captain De Marchi and were most probably incised in copper by the Antwerp engraver Ameet Tavenier, since they were monogrammed ATA (Ameet Tavenier Antwerpianus). It was De Hooghe who engraved the writing examples. He signed with “Cornelis de Hooghe Bredanus Sculpsit”, in the final print to be replaced by "Cornelius de Hooghe | Sculptor Literaru". A simpler version of the Excercitatio was later made, for which Perret and De Hooghe used the last remaining illustrative page border of De Marchi's fortification book. On this last border several geometrical and building constructor's instruments appear, clearly showing that these borders were intended to be used for the De Marchi's production, rather than as an illustration of the book on handwriting examples.

In January 1570, De Hooghe was back in London. There are no indications that he returned to the Low Countries until the year of 1574, when he paid a brief visit to the Dutch towns of Hoorn and Haarlem. It is believed that De Hooghe was involved in the release of Lieven van Weldam (his distant cousin), who was taken prisoner during the Battle on the Zuiderzee (1573) and kept in captivity in this town. During the negotiations with the local authorities he presented himself as a “trader” from the English coastal town of Ipswich.

His mission was successful and Van Weldam was released in exchange for the Haarlem mayor Kies. Right after the exchange had taken place, De Hooghe received an invitation by the Haarlem magistrate for a map of Haarlem to be made, which he refused, because of the low price. He then returned to Ipswich, where he worked as a trader again. Some records of shiploads and a few court cases of ill-handed transports of goods proof that he had his own trading company. It is not known when exactly he became involved in making the first atlas of England and Wales, also known by the names of "Elisabeth Atlas" and "Saxton Atlas" (Christophorus Saxtonius, Descriptio Angliae 1579), for which he incised the first map of Norfolk, “Norfolciae comitatus...” in the year 1574. The map could have been made before and/or after his stay in Hoorn and Haarlem. It was this map that was signed by “Cornelius Hogius”. It is his last known work as an engraver. In 1576 De Hooghe married in Rotterdam to Maritgen Tromper of a wealthy Rotterdam family of traders. One of the court cases indicates that Maritgen took part in his trading firm.

== Political career ==
Around All Saints Day of 1581, he was contacted by Philip II's envoy De Silva, one of emperor Charles V's former chamberlains, who brought him letters of credence, confirming him as an imperial bastard. He was asked by the king to bring the dissident Netherlands back under the rule of the king. Should he succeed, then De Hooghe would become Duke of Gelre or obtain any other noble title. De Hooghe accepted the offer and started giving speeches in many cities in several parts of the Low Countries trying to convince the people to make an end to the costly war against Spain. He became very popular amongst the pacifist Dutch Anabaptists who even crowned him as their king. When he had written down his thoughts on paper from which a booklet and some letters to the magistrates were to be printed and distributed, he was betrayed by the printer even before printing took place and he was taken into custody. After a 40-day investigation, he was sentenced to death on March 29, 1583, by beheading. His body was to be quartered and to be exposed by suspending it at four "half gallows" at each of the four entrances of The Hague.

Although De Hooghe was portrayed as a traitor of his country by later historians, especially the ones who exaggerated the 80-year struggle for independence from Spain, such as P.C. Hooft, De Hooghe portrayed himself as “a man who wants to bring peace”. Just before being sentenced he spoke the words “must I die just because I want to bring prosperity to this country?”. His support by the peaceful Anabaptists and the fact that he gave speeches and tried to persuade people and magistrates to elect him as the rightful governor of the Low Countries instead of his half brother Philip II, who he was said to dislike because of his brutality, are indications of his peaceful intentions. He seems to have played his role otherwise than intended by his half-brother Philip II. Instead of using military force, Cornelis de Hooghe tried to persuade the magistrates, local guilds and individual citizens to follow him into a peaceful transition under his guidance. Because of the absence of any use of force or brutality (no shot was fired, just books written and speeches held), his death sentence can therefore be regarded as an abuse of justice, or as a political process by the Court of Holland (Hof van Holland), whose members had to lose much political influence by Cornelis de Hooghe's ideas.
