= Serrao =

Serrao or Serrão is an Italian and Portuguese surname respectively. Notable people with the surname include:

- Alliny Serrão (born 1985), Brazilian politician
- Carlos Serrao, American photographer
- Francis Serrao (born 1959), Indian Roman Catholic bishop
- Francisco Serrão (died 1521), Portuguese explorer
- Giovanni Andrea Serrao (1731–1799), Italian intellectual and churchman
- João Serrão (died 1521), Spanish navigator
- Joaquim Veríssimo Serrão (1925–2020), Portuguese historian
- José Carlos Serrão (born 1950), Brazilian football manager and former player
- Luella A. Varney Serrao (1865–1935), American sculptor
- Manuel Serrão, Portuguese nobleman
- Paolo Serrao (1830–1907), Italian composer
- Priya Serrao (born 1992), Australian lawyer, policy adviser, beauty pageant titleholder, and Miss Universe Australia 2019
