= List of mayors of Macapá =

The following is a list of mayors of the city of Macapá, in Amapá state, Brazil.

- Joaquim José Romão de Almeida, 1889-1900
- Pompeu Aureliano de Moura, 1900-1901
- Coriolano Jucá, 1895-1896
- Manuel Teodoro Mendes, 1896-1914
- Leopoldo Machado, 1914-1920
- Alexandre Vaz Tavares, 1920-1921
- Ernestino Borges, 1921-1922
- Jorge Hurley, 1922-1926
- Otávio Acioli Ramos, 1926-1931
- Jacinto Boutinelli, 1930-1932
- Eliezer Levy, 1932-1935, 1937, 1942-1944
- Francisco Ramos Soares, 1935-1936
- Sílvio Ferreira Sá, 1938-1941
- João Ferreira Sá, 1941
- Odilardo Gonçalves da Silva, 1944-1945
- Jacy Barata Jucá, 1945-1947
- José Serra e Silva, 1947-1950
- Edílson Borges de Oliveira, 1950-1951, 1955-1956
- Claudomiro de Moraes, 1951, 1952-1954
- Heitor de Azevedo Picanço, 1951-1952, 1957-1961
- Cláudio Carvalho do Nascimento, 1955
- Ronaldo Tavares Souto Maior, 1961
- Amaury Guimarães Farias, 1961
- Otávio Gonçalves de Oliveira, 1961-1962
- Jacy Barata Jucá, 1962-1963
- João Batista Travassos de Arruda, 1963
- Mário Luiz Barata, 1963-1964
- Edmundo Wanderley Chaves, 1964
- Renée de Azevedo Limmounche, 1964-1965
- Aristeu Loureiro Accioli Ramos, 1965
- Alfredo Oliveira, 1965
- Douglas Lobato Lopes, 1965-1967
- Augusto Fernando Porto Carrero, 1967-1968
- Guilherme Paulo Hettenhauser, 1968
- Raimundo Ubaldo Figueira, 1968-1969
- João de Oliveira Côrtes, 1969-1972
- Rubens Antonio Albuquerque, 1972
- Lourival Benvenuto da Silva, 1973-1974
- Cleyton Figueiredo de Azevedo, 1974-1978
- Newton Douglas Barata dos Santos, 1978
- Domício Campos de Magalhães, 1978-1980
- Murilo Pinheiro, 1980-1985
- Jonas Borges, 1985
- Raimundo de Azevedo Costa, 1986-1988
- João Capiberibe, 1989-1992
- Papaléo Paes, 1993-1996
- Anníbal Barcellos, 1997-2000
- João Henrique Pimentel, 2001-2008
- Roberto Góes, 2009-2012
- Clécio Luis, 2013-2026
- Antônio Furlan, 2026-present

== See also ==
- Macapá municipal election, 2004
- Macapá municipal election, 2016
- Macapá history
- Macapá history (in Portuguese)
- History of Amapá (state)
- List of mayors of largest cities in Brazil (in Portuguese)
- List of mayors of capitals of Brazil (in Portuguese)
