= 2024 Macapá mayoral election =

← 2020	October 6, 2024	2028 →
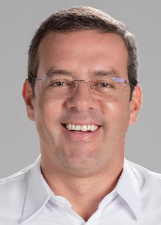

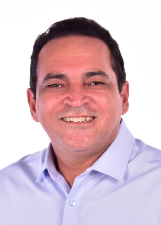

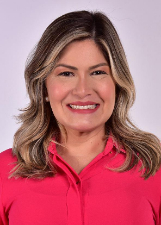
Nominee	Antônio Furlan	Paulo Lemos	Aline Gurgel
Party	MDB	PSOL	Republicanos
Alliance	Working for the People	Macapá of Hope	Macapá for All of Us
Running mate	Mário Neto	Ivanéia Alves	Adilton Correa
Popular vote	204,291	23,491	8,897
Percentage	85.08%	9,78%	3.71%
Mayor before election
Dr. Furlan
MDB
Elected mayor
Dr. Furlan
MDB

The 2024 Macapá municipal election took place in the city of Macapá, Brazil on 6 October 2024. Voters elected a mayor, vice mayor, and 23 councillors.

The incumbent mayor is Antônio Furlan, otherwise known as Dr. Furlan, of the Brazilian Democratic Movement. He was elected mayor in 2020 as a member of Cidadania in the second round against Josiel Alcolumbre, the brother of the former president of the Federal Senate Davi Alcolumbre.

Dr. Furlan was reelected in the first round facing scattered opposition.
