= March of the Family with God for Liberty =

1964 anti-João Goulart protests in Brazil

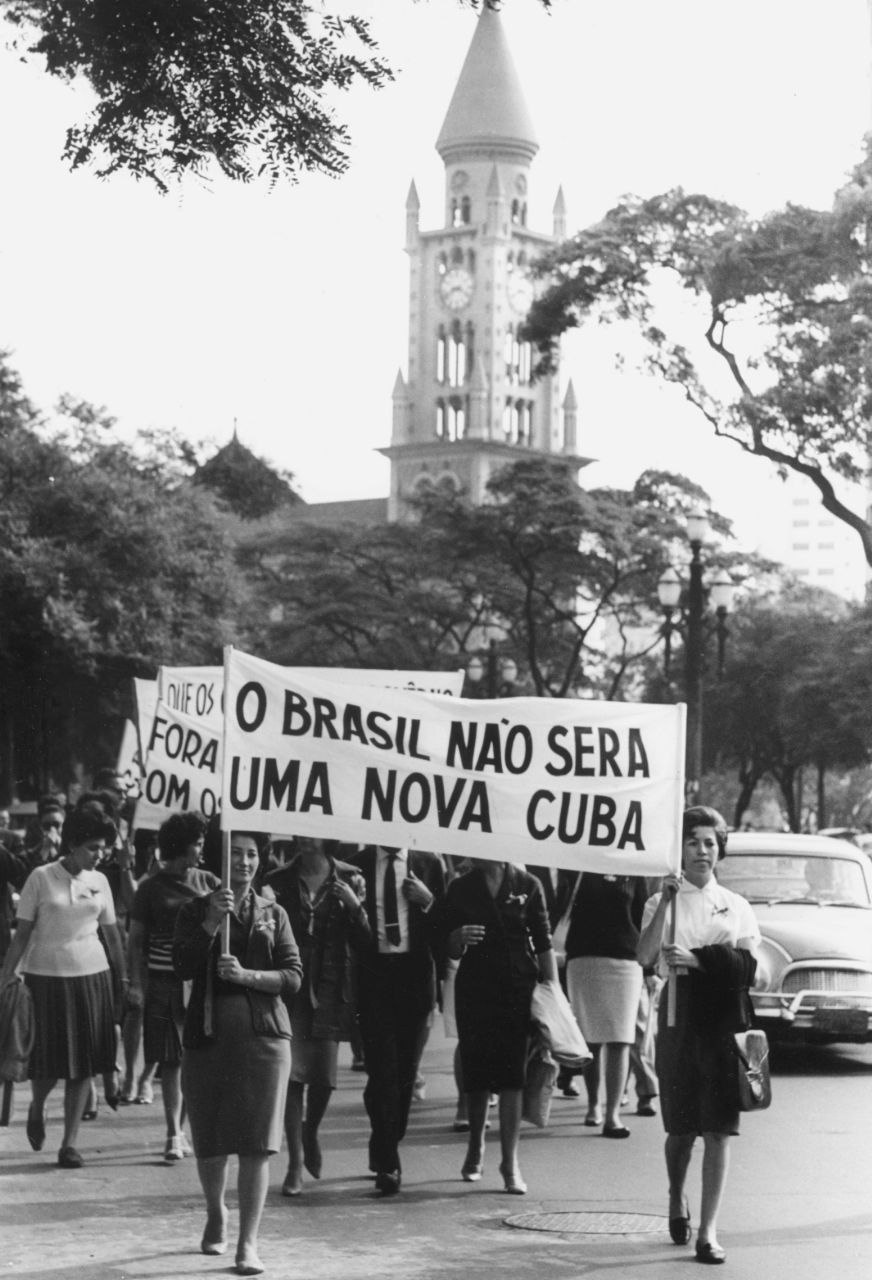
Women march with a banner that reads "Brazil will not be a new Cuba."

The March of the Family with God for Liberty (Portuguese: Marcha da Família com Deus pela Liberdade) was the common name for a series of public demonstrations that took place between March 19 and June 8, 1964, in Brazil in response to what was described, by the military and conservative sectors of society, a communist threat posed by the actions of radical groups and by the speech at a rally given by then-president João Goulart on March 13 of that same year.

In the previous days, Goulart had signed two decrees allowing the expropriation of land in a ten-kilometer strip along highways, railways and dams and transferring control of five oil refineries operating in the country to the federal government. In addition, he had promised to carry out the so-called basic reforms, a series of administrative, agrarian, financial and tax reforms, to guarantee what Goulart called social justice, based on the social function of land and urban developments, long-standing demands that were widely felt in society at the time. He had also conducted moderate reforms in the same spirit for years before that. The United States government and the Brazilian right wing viewed these ideas as threats to their interests and, in the context of the Cold War and the polarization between the United States and the Soviet Union, their propaganda presented them as a step towards the implementation of a socialist dictatorship.

Various social groups, including the clergy, businesspeople and various political sectors organized marches, bringing a considerable number of people to the streets with the aim of overthrowing the Goulart government. The first of the marches took place on March 19 – the day of Saint Joseph, the patron saint of families – in São Paulo and brought together between 300 and 500 thousand people. It was organized by groups such as the Women's Campaign for Democracy (CAMDE), the Women's Civic Union (UCF), the Fraternal Urban and Rural Friendship, and the Brazilian Rural Society, among others, and also received support from the Federation of Industries of the State of São Paulo (FIESP) and the controversial Institute of Research and Social Studies (IPES). At the time, the "Manifesto to the People of Brazil" was distributed, calling for Goulart's removal from the presidency. After the military coup that deposed the president on April 1, the marches were renamed the "Victory Marches". The largest of them, organized by CAMDE in Rio de Janeiro, brought about a million people to the streets on April 2, 1964.

== Background ==
The march was sparked by a speech by then President João Goulart in Rio de Janeiro on March 13 in which he called for political reforms including rent control; wealth tax; expropriation of land within 10 km of roads, railroads and dams, and the nationalization of oil refineries. For years, the mild reforms had been seen by the US government as threatening to its financial interests and hegemony in the region. Goulart had also called for nationalization of foreign mining concerns, such as US-owned Hanna Mining. To discredit Goulart, the US played on exaggerated fears of communism through extensive propaganda supplied via McCarthyist journalists such as Clarence W. Hall and CIA-funded figures such as Father Patrick Peyton, who helped exaggerate the threat of communism. The anticommunist propaganda instilled in Brazilians the specter of an imminent "Red" takeover during the Cold War while the US government's financial and geopolitical motivations for removing Goulart remained hidden. The media-fed fears prepared the ground for the march.

== Mobilization ==
"The people are tired of lies and promises of demagogic reforms. Yes, we will make reforms, starting with the reform of our attitude. From now on, the communists and their allies will find the people standing up. [...] With God, for Freedom, we will march for the Salvation of the Fatherland!"

— Text of the Manifesto to the People of Brazil.,

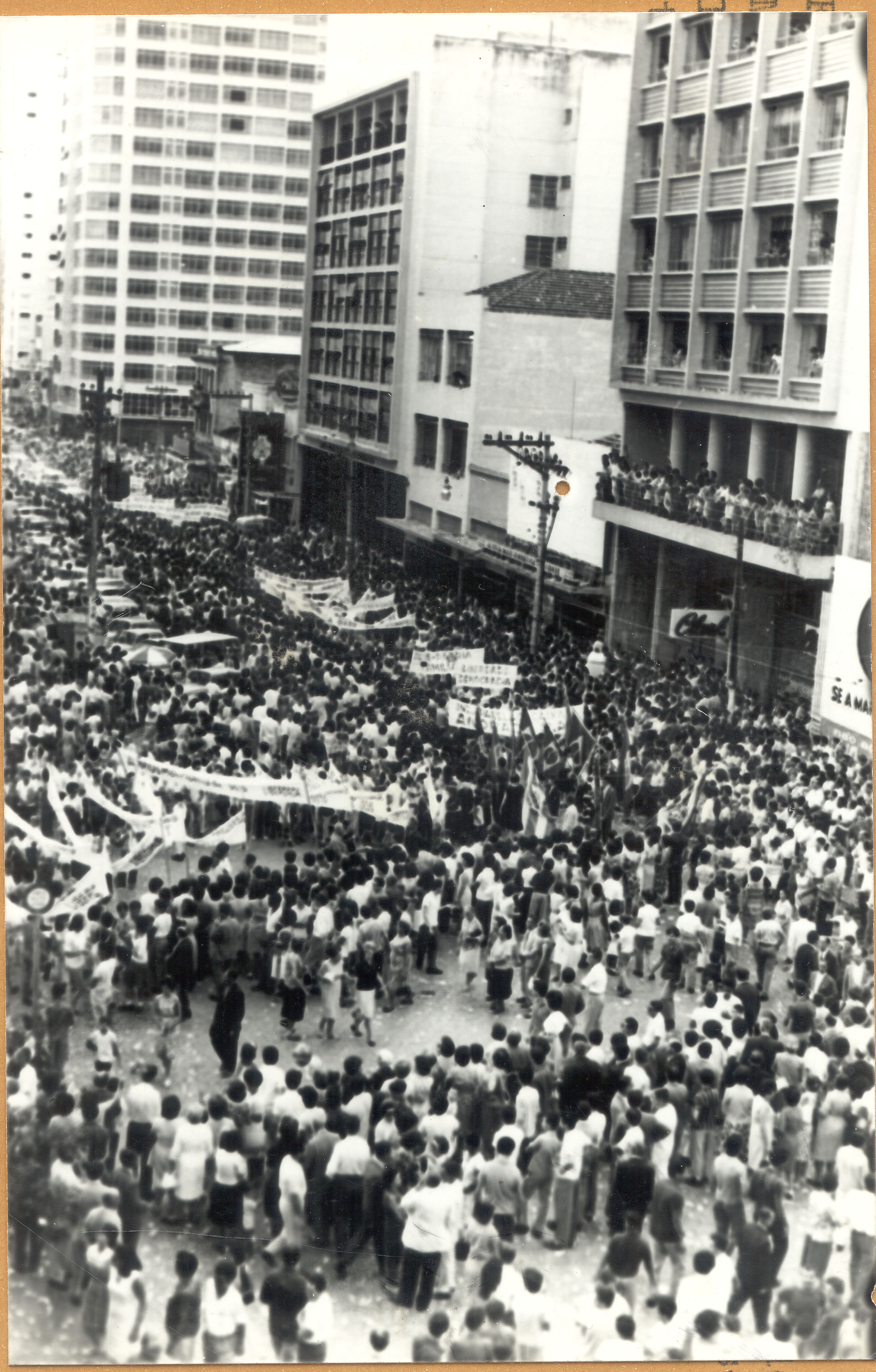
The March in 1964

The March was conceived by federal deputy Antônio Sílvio Cunha Bueno, of the Social Democratic Party (PSD), as a kind of conservative response to the Reforms Rally, with the aim of showing the coup plotters that there was a social base of support for their movement. It was inspired by the anti-communist preaching of Irish priest Patrick Peyton, founder of the Rosary Crusade for the Family movement. Cunha Bueno sought out businessmen and the vice-governor of São Paulo, Laudo Natel, to offer logistical support for his endeavor. The then governor of São Paulo, Ademar de Barros, raised money to buy trucks for the Public Force (currently the Military Police of the State of São Paulo) and ensure the order of the March. Natel recommended that Cunha Bueno seek out the nun Ana de Lourdes, granddaughter of Ruy Barbosa, to recruit female leaders. The nun saw threats to the Catholic faith in Goulart's speech, which stated that "it is not with Rosaries that reforms are fought".

The demonstration was originally to be called the "March of Redress to the Holy Rosary", but Ademar considered that the name excluded other religions and that the opposition to the Goulart government should remain united in order to depose the president. Congresswoman Conceição da Costa Neves proposed the March of the Family with God for Freedom. The governor of São Paulo was represented in the work of calling for the march by his wife, Leonor Mendes de Barros. The movement quickly gained support, but there was a lack of female leaders. IPES, a study center, offered courses in which women received lessons on how to preach family unity against communism. They were then instructed to educate their friends and loved ones against the "red threat".

Thirty business associations signed the manifesto calling for the March, published in the newspaper O Estado de S. Paulo. Students from the Mackenzie Presbyterian Institute and representatives from FIESP formed delegations of supporters to attend the March. At the same time, pamphlets were distributed among the population, while the clergy published messages addressed to the President. Advertising executive José Carlos Pereira de Sousa created slogans, banners and posters for the event, with the words "The only good red is lipstick", "One, two, three, Jango in jail", "Down with the red imperialists" and "Green and yellow, with no hammer or sickle", while the followers of Father Peyton adopted the motto "The family that prays together stays together".

== The marches ==
=== First march in São Paulo ===
"Let reforms be made, but for freedom. Otherwise, no. For the Constitution. Otherwise, no. For the Christian conscience of our people. Otherwise, no."

— Auro de Moura Andrade, then president of the Senate, in a speech during the March, in São Paulo.,

The group of protesters, which began forming at 2:00 p.m., left Praça da República at 4:00 p.m. Before and during the demonstration, small Brazilian flags and the text of the "Manifesto to the People of Brazil" were distributed. An hour later, the group arrived at Praça da Sé, where the platform was set up. The march went along Barão de Itapetininga Street, Praça Ramos de Azevedo, Viaduto do Chá, Praça do Patriarca and Rua Direita before arriving at Praça da Sé.

At Praça da Sé, Leonor hoisted the flag while the Public Force band played the National Anthem. The Mass for the Salvation of Democracy, conducted by Father Peyton, kicked off the event, in which twenty participants spoke for five minutes each. The first speaker was Amaro Cesar, followed by Senator and priest Benedito Mário Calazans, of the National Democratic Union (UDN); Cunha Bueno; Geraldo Goulart, a veteran of the 1932 Constitutionalist Revolution; Carolina Ribeiro, former Secretary of Education of São Paulo; federal deputies Arnaldo Cerdeira, of the Social Progressive Party (PSP), Herbert Levy (UDN) and Plínio Salgado, of the Popular Representation Party (PRP), the latter the creator of integralism in Brazil; the mayor of Campinas, Ruy Hellmeister Novaes (PSB); state deputies Camilo Aschar (UDN), Conceição da Costa Neves (PSD) and Everardo Magalhães, of the Christian Democratic Party (PDC); and state deputy Ciro Albuquerque (PSP), president of the Legislative Assembly of São Paulo, also gave speeches. Whenever a speaker mentioned the names of Goulart, Leonel Brizola or Fidel Castro, the crowd reacted with boos. Auro de Moura Andrade (PSD), then president of the Senate, gave the last speech. Among other illustrious personalities present were Carlos Lacerda (UDN), governor of the state of Guanabara, who did not speak, and television presenter Hebe Camargo.

Despite the large turnout, the March was the target of a protest. During the march, state deputy Murilo de Sousa Reis, of the National Labour Party (PTN), closed off a commercial building on Barão de Itapetininga Street and, accompanied by police officers, searched all of the building's rooms. The decision to search the building occurred after a bucket of water was thrown at the protesters from one of the establishments. The deputy arrested the person responsible and another individual who was with him. Both were taken to the Department of Political and Social Order (DOPS) and released that evening. The Public Force also detained two young men in Praça da Sé who were carrying a large quantity of eggs inside a car. According to passersby, the young men intended to throw the eggs into the crowd. Both were detained and taken to DOPS. It was later discovered that the boxes of eggs were destined for a supermarket and the two were released.

The March, however, was basically organized and carried out by citizens from the middle class and the wealthier classes. The United States ambassador to Brazil, Lincoln Gordon, and one of the organizers of the coup d'état with the Brazilian military, pointed out in a telegram to the State Department: "The only discordant note was the evident limited participation of the lower classes in the march." His military attaché, Vernon Walters, attested to the lack of popularity of the movement and a fear that the coup against João Goulart would fail due to a lack of popular support.

=== Marches in other cities ===
After the march held in the capital, other similar demonstrations took place in the interior of the state of São Paulo. On March 21, marches were held in Araraquara and Assis; on the 25th, around 80 thousand people marched in Santos; on the 28th, the residents of Itapetininga held their march and, on the 29th, marches took place in Atibaia, Ipauçu and Tatuí. The march also took place in other states. On the 24th, a march was held in the city of Bandeirantes in Paraná. According to the book A ditadura militar no Brasil - A história em cima dos fatos, 49 marches took place throughout the country between March 19 and June 8, 1964, with the marches after the coup receiving the generic name of Marcha da Vitória.

=== Victory March in Rio ===
The March called for April 2, 1964, in Rio de Janeiro became known as the Victory March after the successful launch of the coup d'état on March 31, which celebrated the deposition of Goulart by the military in a march that left the square of the Candelária Church at 4:00 p.m. and headed towards the Esplanada do Castelo. Among the institutions that supported this March were the Assembly of God, the Young Men's Christian Association, the Parents and Teachers Association, CAMDE, created in 1962 in the auditorium of the newspaper O Globo – the Congregation of Belém, the Brazilian Red Cross, the Patriotic Falange, the FEB Ex-Combatants Group and the Christ the Redeemer Society.

The idea for the March came from the vicar of Ipanema, Friar Leovigildo Balestieri, the engineer Glycon de Paiva and General Golbery do Couto e Silva, and was created by Amélia Molina Bastos, sister of General Antônio de Mendonça Molina, from the information and counter-information sector of Ipês.

== The divided Catholic clergy ==
With Brazil having the largest Catholic community in the Americas, the way conservative and progressive groups found to mobilize the people was through religion. The conservative layers of the Catholic Church ignored the social messages of Pope John XXIII, and religious agents collaborated with the coup, including as informants, because they believed that the military regime would curb "atheistic communism". They found support in the Caritas plan, financed by Catholics from rich countries and implemented in almost all dioceses in Brazil. Caritas sought to mitigate the effects of the socioeconomic crisis that was affecting the country by distributing food and medicine, but at the same time, it indoctrinated the poor to oppose revolutionary ideals, which had been on the rise since the success of the group that promoted the Cuban Revolution of 1959.

The most notorious example of the use of religion against President Goulart occurred in late 1963, when the then archbishop of Rio de Janeiro, Jaime de Barros Câmara, brought to Brazil Patrick Peyton, an American parish priest of Irish origin known for his anti-communist preaching. With the motto "the family that prays together stays together", Peyton promoted a series of mass public events for the Brazilian faithful in which he associated the evils of the world with "atheist politicians who want to change the natural order of things". According to Darcy Ribeiro, Goulart's Chief of Staff, Peyton inaugurated the mass actions against the Brazilian government. Noticing the political agitation promoted by the priest, Ribeiro called him to Brasília to convince him to pray the rosary with the president. The priest's mass for the president was recorded and broadcast on television. Despite attempts to minimize the impact of the priest's anti-communist preaching, the groundwork for mass actions against the government had already been prepared. Years later, Peyton was identified by North American historians as a CIA agent, an expert in raising the Catholic masses against atheistic communism in the name of the Virgin Mary.

On the other hand, progressive sectors, whose greatest icon was Hélder Câmara, auxiliary bishop of Rio de Janeiro and later archbishop of Olinda and Recife, were in favor of confronting social problems and engaging the people in the struggle for better living conditions. This view, however, only began to gain strength among members of the Church in Brazil from the 1970s onwards, when the military regime increased repression against its opponents. From then on, the Catholic Church began to lean heavily against the military regime, especially in the figure of Paulo Evaristo Arns, archbishop of São Paulo, who initially supported the military coup.

== Results and legacy ==
The march was a precursor to the Brazilian coup d'état and prepared the public to accept a coup against Goulart.

The military coup installed a military dictatorship that lasted 21 years and arrested, exiled, brutally tortured, and killed thousands. Despite the substantial investment in anticommunist propaganda, no evidence of such a threat ever emerged. Their amnesia was aided by the 1979 Amnesty Law, which granted immunity to the regime's torturers, as well as by calls from former regime officials to "turn the page."

The amnesia is seen in the occasional parade commemorating the dictatorship, usually by the right-wing military. In 2014, commemorative marches were held in São Paulo and Rio de Janeiro in support of the 1964 marches, the latter attracting around 150 attendees and around 50 counterdemonstrators.

== See also ==
- Cansei
- Conservatism in Brazil
