= Mohamed Ali Hamze =

Brazilian politician (born 1928)

Mayor of Cambará
- In office 1 January 1989 – 31 December 1992
- In office 1 January 1997 – 31 December 2004

State Deputy of Paraná
- In office 1 February 2007 – 24 July 2008

Personal details
- Born: 5 February 1928 Ain Kfar Zabad, Lebanon
- Died: 24 July 2008 (aged 80) Campina Grande do Sul, Paraná, Brazil
- Party: Brazilian Democratic Movement (MDB)

Mohamed Ali Hamze, also known as Mamede, was a Lebanese Brazilian politician. He was Mayor of Cambará, Paraná, for three terms, and state deputy of Paraná from 2006 until his death in 2008.
