= Comício da Central =

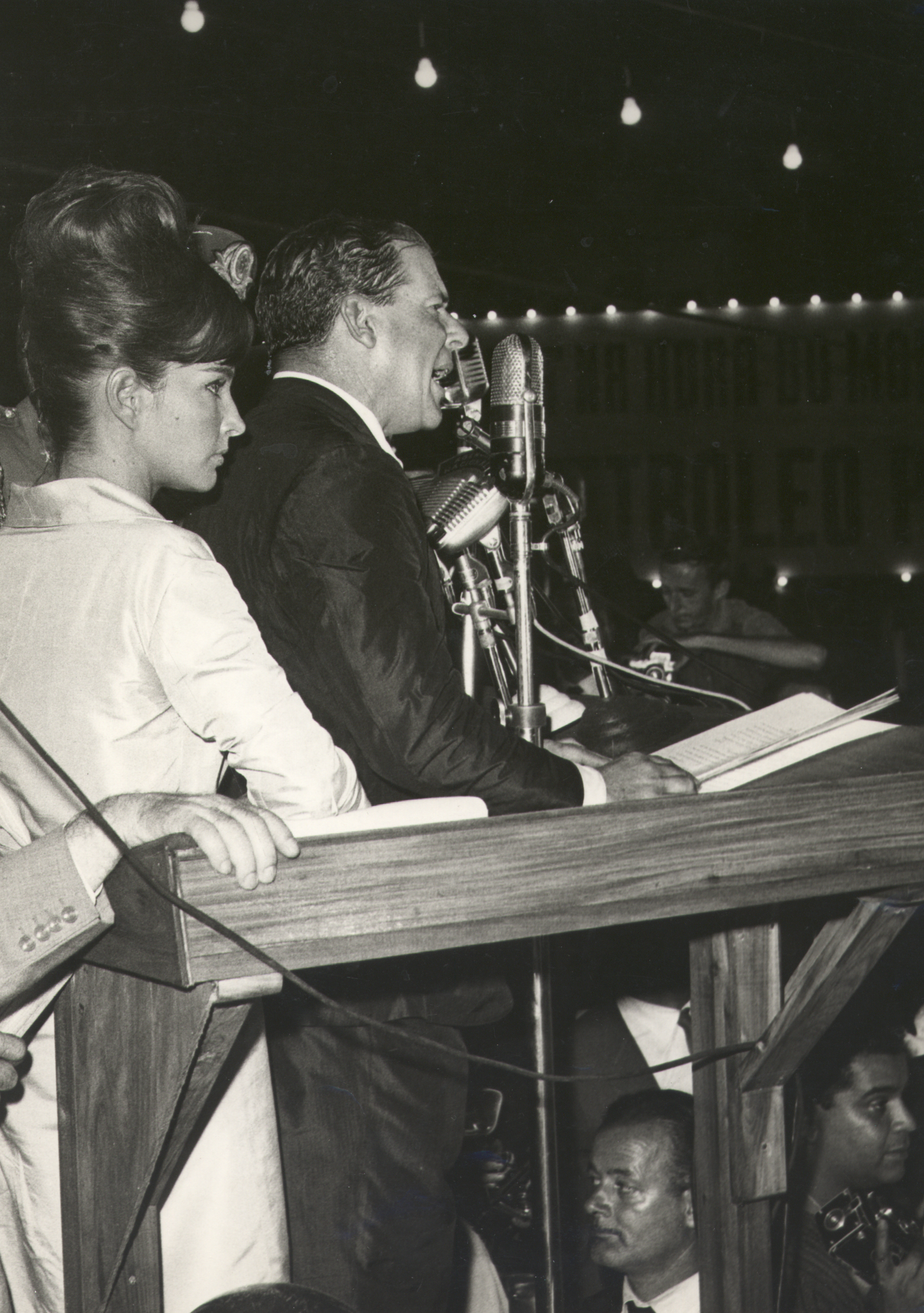
- Date: March 13, 1964 (62 years ago)
- Location: Central do Brasil
- Also known as: Reforms Rally
- Type: Rally

The Comício da Central, or Reforms Rally, was a rally held on March 13, 1964, in the city of Rio de Janeiro, at Praça da República, located in front of the Central do Brasil station. With about 200,000 people (or 150,000 people) there they gathered to hear the words of the President of Brazil, João Goulart, and of the former governor of Rio Grande do Sul, Leonel Brizola. The General Workers Command, organizer of the rally, had been willing to take 100,000 people. The João Goulart Institute has documents showing that there were plans for a bombing of the rally, which was abandoned so as "not to create a martyr". At the time, there were reports of a sniper and rumors that communists would carry out the attack and blame the military. Goulart did not wish to go to the rally due to a heart condition, and to his wife, Maria Thereza Goulart, he said: "Teca, I'm going to fulfill my duty, even if it's the last one".

On this occasion, Goulart signed two decrees, with all the sovereignty that the 1946 constitution allowed him. The first of these was symbolic and consisted of the expropriation of the oil refineries not yet in the hands of Petrobras. The second - called the SUPRA decree (Superintendency of Agrarian Reform) - declared under-utilized properties subject to expropriation, specifying the location and size of those that would be subject to the measure. The president also revealed that urban reform - a scarecrow for the middle class fearful of losing their properties to tenants - and proposals to be sent to Congress, which foresaw tax changes and granting the vote to the illiterate and lower ranks of the Armed Forces, were in the pipeline.

== Consequences ==
Comício da Central do Brasil, Rio de Janeiro.

=== End of Democratic Period (1946-1964) ===
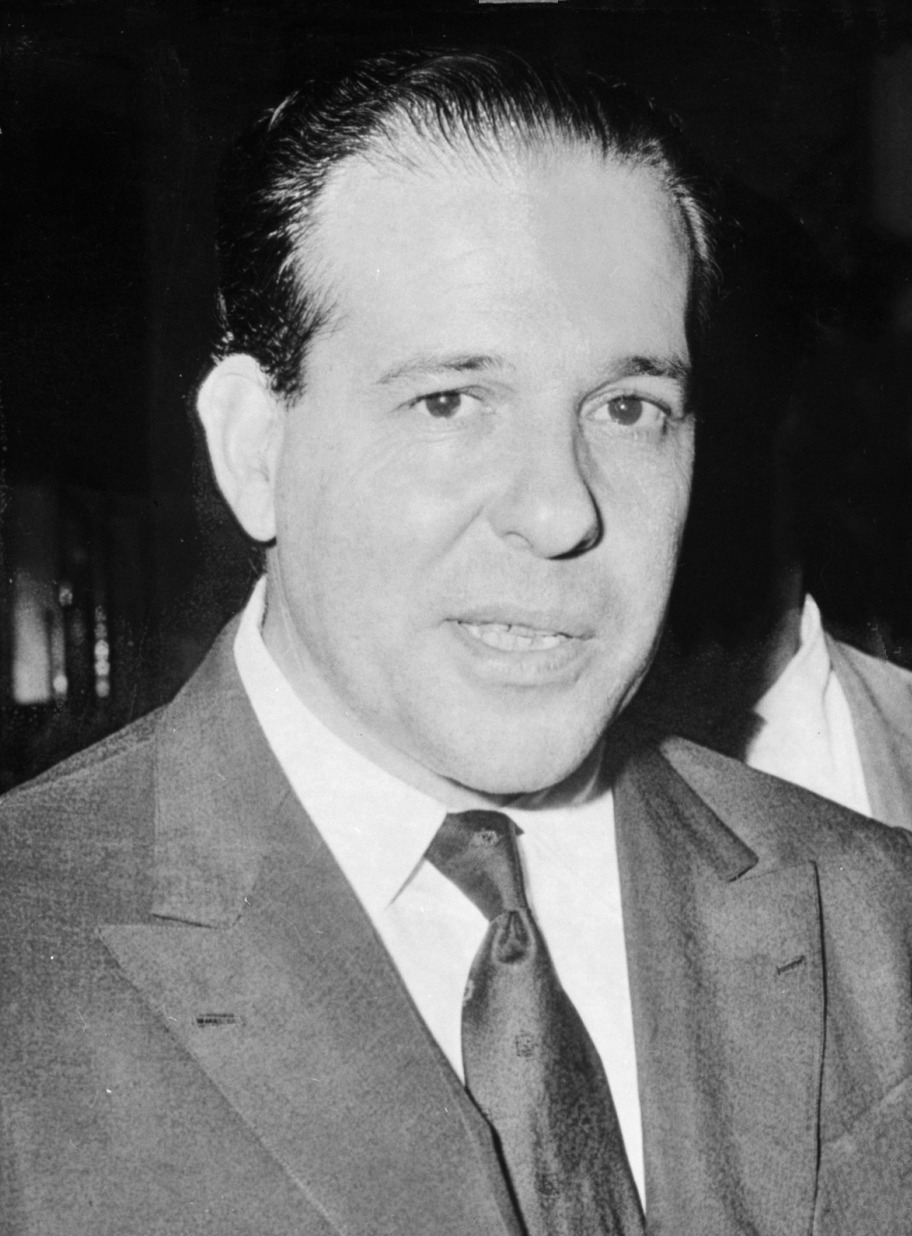
João Goulart, Jango, on March 24, 1964, few days after the rally and before the coup.

The 1945 election is considered the first representative democracy in Brazil, with a secret ballot system, supervised by the Judiciary, that elected the president of the Republic, deputies and senators. It was the first time in the country's history that national political parties were built with defined ideological programs, and that aimed at the interests of the population, since both the parties of the Empire (1822–1889) and the state organizations of the First Republic (1889–1930) were focused on the elite. According to historian Jorge Ferreira, the period 1946-64 was disqualified as a democratic experience, because there was a desire to cover up the political activities of the social actors, marginalizing the efforts of union workers, peasants in their leagues and other groups that were politically active in the period. Ferreira affirms that the right-wingers that took over the government in 1964 used the prerogative that the people were naive and lacked political culture, on the other hand, the left-wing sectors belittled the democratic experience of the 46-64 period by claiming about the manipulation of the Brazilian population by reformist politicians and labor unionists. In this sense, the belief of the rightist ideology was that there were no citizens aware of their rights, while for the left, the workers were not aware of their true class interests. Other sectors that also helped to disqualify the period (46–64) came from academia and the press. Many intellectuals created in the Brazilian academic imaginary the notion that society would have difficulties in living with democratic institutions, Brazilian historians themselves kept their distance from the period, their master's theses and doctoral dissertations usually turned to themes such as slavery, or the military dictatorship, but paid little attention to this period, generally characterizing it as populist. Recently, some important research has been done and deepening the understanding of the period, in which Jorge Ferreira, Professor Jefferson José Queler, Tácito Thadeu Leite Rolim, Bryan McCann and Lucilia de Almeida Neves Delgado stand out.

Since the resignation of Jânio Quadros, Brazil had been going through a period of great political, social and ideological upheaval. The so-called Base Reforms proposed by the president and his ministry, besides being badly interpreted, could not get off the paper due to the president's lack of support in Congress. The failure of the Triennial Plan and the subsequent rise of spiraling inflation, the radicalization of the peasant movements, and the conflicts of interests of various social groups made it impossible for the government to get around the situation.

The opposition's response came with the March of the Family with God for Liberty, beginning in mid-March 1964. These marches have gathered approximately half a million people, which showed the lack of support from part of society for the Goulart government.

With the Central Rally, Goulart's ideas were decisively linked by conservative sectors to the Syndicalist Republic and Communism. Days later, a rebellion of sailors in Rio de Janeiro was another serious incident, but this time it directly affected the military hierarchy and discipline. Goulart, as a way to solve the conflict, gave amnesty to the rebels. However, for the coup sector, Goulart's action was a clear demonstration of disrespect towards the Armed Forces, which took advantage of the situation to consolidate, on March 31, the coup d'état, which culminated with the military dictatorship (1964–1985) and, consequently, with the exile of the president.

== Bibliography ==
- Aggio, Alberto; Barbosa, Agnaldo de Sousa; Coelho Lambert, Hercídia Mara Facuri (2002). Política e sociedade no Brasil, 1930-1964 (in Brazilian Portuguese). São Paulo, SP: Annablume.
- Fausto, Boris (2010). História do Brasil (in Brazilian Portuguese). São Paulo: Edusp. p. 657.
- Colares, Anselmo Alencar; Sousa Colares, Maria Lília Imbririba (2003). Do autoritarismo repressivo à construção da democracia participativa: história e gestão educacional (in Brazilian Portuguese). Campinas, SP: Autores Associados.
- Rezende, Claudinei Cássio de (2010). Suicídio revolucionário: a luta armada e a herança da quimérica revolução em etapas (PDF) (in Brazilian Portuguese). São Paulo, SP: SciELO - Editora UNESP. p. 258. doi:10.7476/9788579830822. ISBN 9788579830822.
- Stédile, João Pedro (2005). A questão agrária no Brasil: Programas de reforma agrária, 1946-2003 (in Brazilian Portuguese). Bib. Orton IICA / CATIE.
- Teodoro, Miguel Aparecido (2010). Ó Pressão... (in Brazilian Portuguese). Joinville, SC: Clube de Autores.
- Mello Bastos, Paulo de (2006). A Caixa Preta do Golpe de 64 (PDF) (in Brazilian Portuguese). Família Bastos. p. 313. ISBN 8589853047. Archived (PDF) from the original on 2021-06-19. IA
