= Aline Gurgel =

Brazilian politician (born 1980)

- Gurgel in 2019

Member of the Chamber of Deputies
- Incumbent
- Assumed office 1 August 2025
- Constituency: Amapá
- In office 1 February 2019 – 1 February 2023
- Constituency: Amapá

Member of the Municipal Chamber of Macapá
- In office 1 January 2013 – 1 January 2017
- Constituency: At-large

Personal details
- Born: Aline Paranhos Varonil Gurgel; 25 November 1980 (age 45) Macapá, Amapá, Brazil
- Party: UNIÃO (2026–present)
- Other political affiliations: PRTB (2009–2011); PR (2011–2015); Republicanos (2015–2026)
- Spouse: Hildegard Gurgel
- Relatives: Vinícius Gurgel (brother-in-law); Telma Gurgel (mother-in-law)
- Profession: Lawyer

Aline Paranhos Varonil Gurgel (née Paranhos Varonil, born 25 November 1980) is a Brazilian politician. She has been a member of the Chamber of Deputies since 2025, having previously served from 2019 to 2023. She is married to Hildegard Gurgel, the daughter-in-law of Telma Gurgel, and the sister-in-law of Vinícius Gurgel.

== Electoral history ==
Year	Election	Party	Office	Coalition	Partners	Party	Votes	Percent	Result
2012	Municipal Election of Macapá	PR	Councillor	—N/a			4,771	2.34%	Elected
2014	State Elections of Macapá	PR	Vice Governor	Unidos pelo Amapá que Queremos (PTdoB, PRB, PROS, PR, PEN, PV, PHS, PSDC, PTN)	Bruno Mineiro	PTdoB	30,135	7.87%	Not elected
2016	Municipal Election of Macapá	PRB	Mayor	Macapá de Todos Nós (PRB, PSL, PR, PSDC, PRTB, PMB, PRP, PTB)	Marcio Costa	PTB	25,365	11.89%	Not elected
2018	State Elections of Amapá	PRB	Federal Deputy	Amapá da Gente (PRB, PTB, DC, PTC, PRP)	—N/a		16,519	5.16%	Elected
2022	State Elections of Amapá	Republicanos	Federal Deputy	—N/a			13,633	3.21%	Elected
2024	Municipal Election of Amapá	Republicanos	Mayor	Macapá pra Todos Nós (Republicanos, PL)	Coronel Adilton	PL	8,897	3.71%	Not elected
2026	State Elections of Amapá	UNIÃO	Federal Deputy	—N/a			25,501	5.54%	Elected
