= Vinícius Gurgel =

Brazilian politician (born 1978)

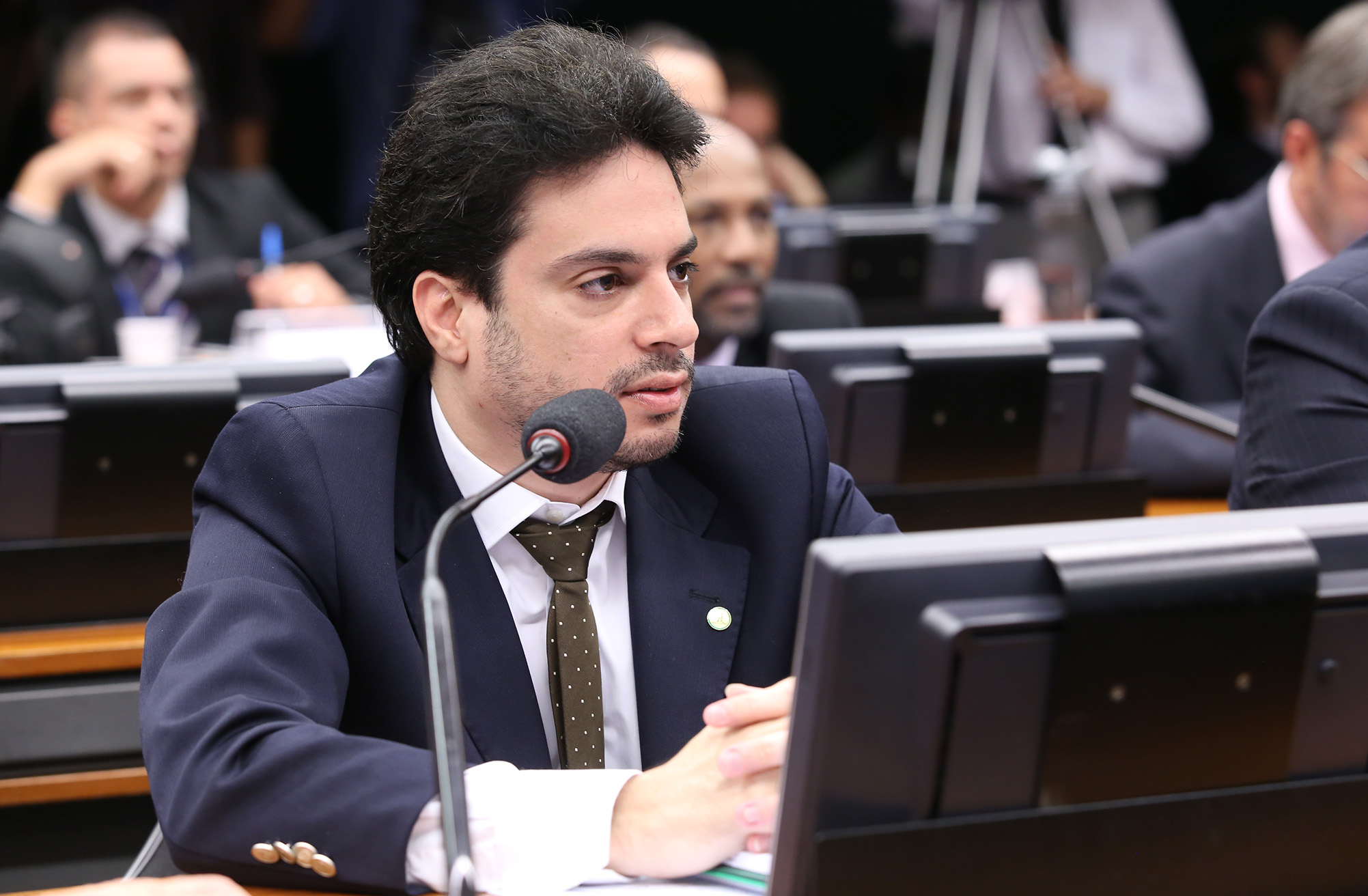
- Gurgel in 2015

Member of the Chamber of Deputies
- Incumbent
- Assumed office 1 February 2011
- Constituency: Amapá

Personal details
- Born: Vinícius de Azevedo Gurgel; 31 July 1978 (age 48) Macapá, Amapá, Brazil
- Party: PL (since 2011)
- Other political affiliations: PRTB (2009–2011)
- Spouse: Luciana Gurgel
- Parent: Telma Gurgel (mother)
- Relatives: Hildegard Gurgel (brother); Aline Gurgel (sister-in-law)

Vinícius de Azevedo Gurgel (born 31 July 1978) is a Brazilian politician serving as a member of the Chamber of Deputies since 2011.

He is the son of Telma Gurgel, the brother of Hildegard Gurgel, and the brother-in-law of Aline Gurgel, and is married to Luciana Gurgel.
