= Forlani =

Forlani is an Italian surname, which is a variant of Furlan and Forlán. Notable people with the surname include:

- Arnaldo Forlani (1925–2023), Italian politician and Prime Minister
- Claire Forlani (born 1971), English actress
- Kazimir Forlani (1834–1887), Croatian Catholic bishop
- Remo Forlani (1927–2009), French writer
- Richard Forlani Neely (1941–2020), former justice and chief justice of the West Virginia Supreme Court of Appeals from 1973 to 1995
- Simone Forlani (born 1974), Italian lightweight rower
