= Furnas do Bom Jesus State Park =

State park in São Paulo, Brazil

- Parque Estadual das Furnas do Bom Jesus
- IUCN category II (national park)
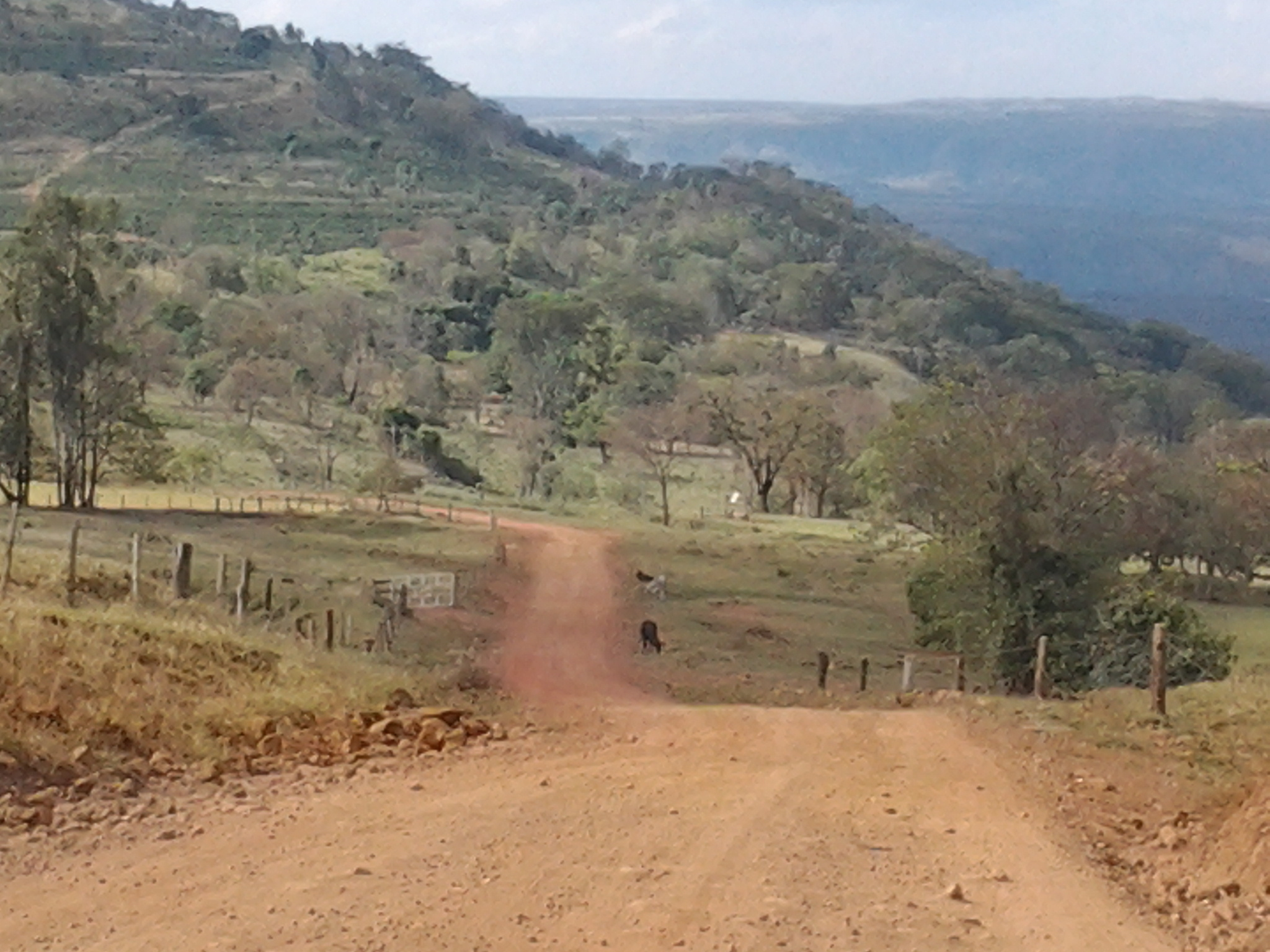
- Hills in the park

- Location within Brazil
- Nearest city: Pedregulho, São Paulo
- Coordinates: 20°13′54″S 47°26′29″W
- Area: 2,069 ha (7.99 sq mi)
- Designation: State park
- Created: 12 October 1989
- Administrator: Fundação Florestal - SP

The Furnas do Bom Jesus State Park (Portuguese: Parque Estadual das Furnas do Bom Jesus) is a state park in the state of São Paulo, Brazil. It protects an area of cerrado and Atlantic Forest with high biodiversity in and around a canyon.

== Location ==
The Furnas do Bom Jesus State Park is in the municipality of Pedregulho, São Paulo, 442 kilometres (275 mi) from the state capital of São Paulo. The municipality is in the northeast of the state in the Ribeirão Preto mesoregion. It has an area of 2,069 hectares (5,110 acres), and is in the hydrographic basin of the Córrego do Pedregulho. .The terrain consists of medium hills with flat tops and slopes with small canyons. The name Furnas do Bom Jesus means "Caves of the Good Jesus", after the Bom Jesus canyon which leads through the park. Altitudes range from 300 to 1,073 metres (984 to 3,520 ft).

== History ==
The Furnas do Bom Jesus State Park was created by state decree 30.591 of 12 October 1989. Decree 31.644 of 31 May 1990 declared the land as being of social interest for the purpose of expropriation. The park is a fully protected conservation unit with the objectives of preserving its ecosystems, geomorphological sites and natural landscapes, while supporting scientific research and public visits. Various universities use the park for scientific research, including the University of São Paulo.

== Environment ==
The Köppen climate classification is Cwb Tropical Altitude, hot and humid in summer, cold and dry in winter. Temperatures vary from 18 to 32 °C (64 to 90 °F) in the summer and 3 to 13 °C (37 to 55 °F) in the winter, with average annual temperature from 21 to 25 °C (70 to 77 °F). The park protects an area with great biodiversity of native flora and fauna, including some species threatened with extinction.

Vegetation includes fragments of cerrado and Atlantic Forest seasonal semi-deciduous forest. There are cerradões, cerrado and meadows in the interfluvial areas, continuous gallery forest in the valley bottoms, including seasonal semi-deciduous forest and seasonal alluvial semi-deciduous forest, and seasonal deciduous forest on the slopes and walls of the canyons, particularly in places where there is the least water in the dry season. The natural cerrado vegetation on the top of the chapadas and the gentler slopes was almost entirely replaced by coffee plantations and pasturage, and is now regenerating. The areas that are harder to access have been little changed, preserving remnants of the original forest.

There are marshes, flooded meadows, high meadows and remnants of Atlantic forest, but the most common forms are typical cerrado, cerradão and asveredas. There are many species of trees, grasses, bromeliads, orchids and other small plants. The cerrado has been drastically modified by humans. Notable species of flora include ipe (Tabebuia species), jacaranda (Jacaranda cuspidifolia), jequitibá (Cariniana estrellensis), açoita-cavalo (Luehea species) and peroba (Aspidosperma species).

Fauna includes species such as armadillo (Dasypus species), southern tamandua (Tamandua tetradactyla) and the threatened Ocelot (Leopardus pardalis) and cougar (Puma concolor).

== Visiting ==
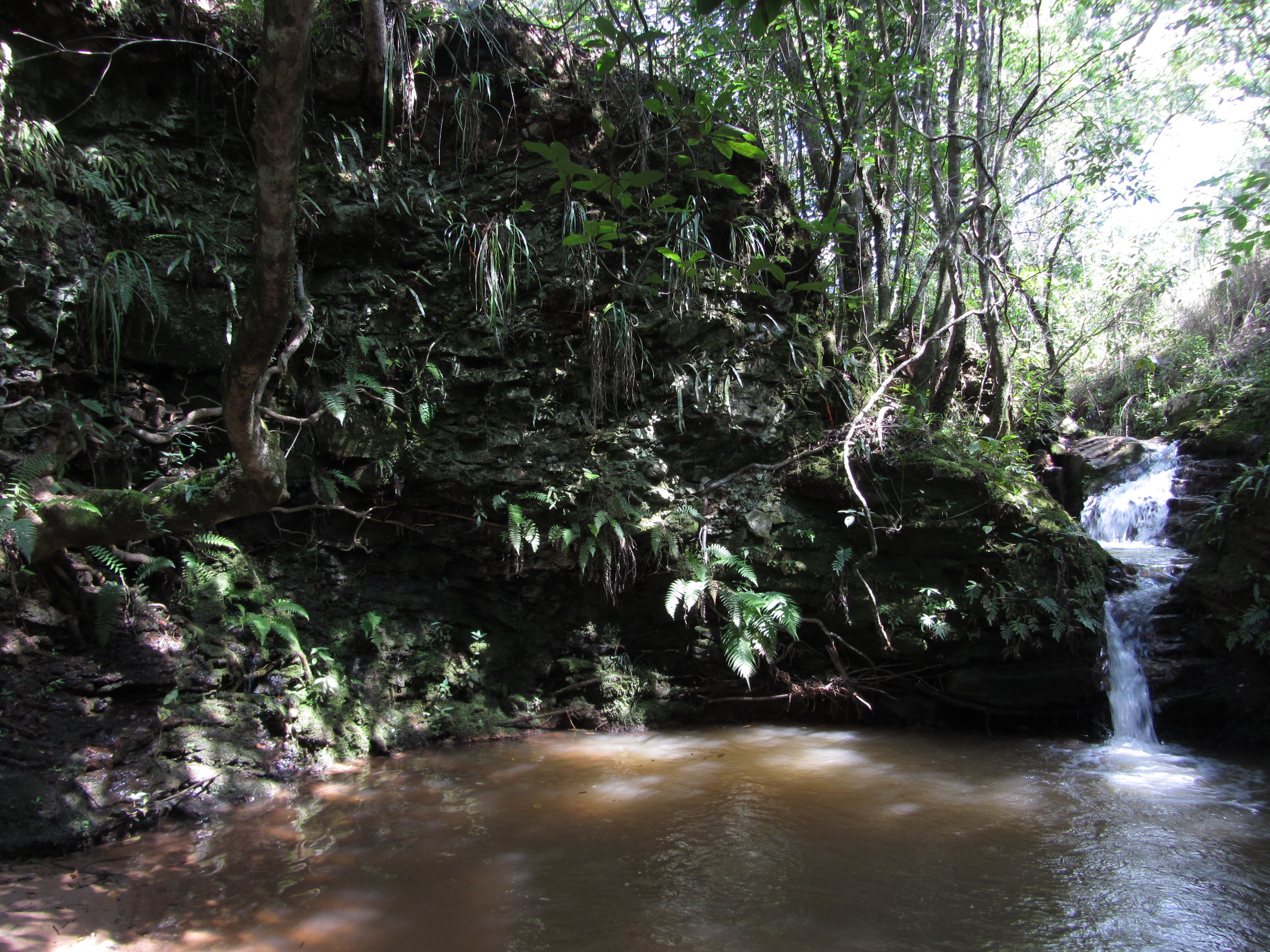
Small waterfall in the park

Visitors are attracted by the natural beauty of the forests and waterfalls. There are viewpoints in the Santa Luzia and Taquari centers. The highlight is the Cascata Grande, the largest waterfall in the park with a free fall of 132 metres (433 ft). The administrative headquarters of the park are in the Santa Luzia Center. There are several trails leading through the park:

Trail	Center	Length	Difficulty	Description
Lookout Trail	Santa Luzia	1,200 metres (3,900 ft)	Low	An interpretive trail with boards covering topics such as native flora and fauna, water, deforestation and pollution. Passes through the Environmental Experience Center and the lookout from which much of the canyon can be seen, crosses Pedregulho Creek and ends at the kiosks and children's playground.
Trail of the Apes	Santa Luzia	200 metres (660 ft)	Moderate	Starts 500 metres (1,600 ft) from the center, and mostly leads through Atlantic Forest remnants. There are benches at various points, and a waterfall at the end of the trail.
Malta Trail	Santa Luzia	1,400 metres (4,600 ft)	Moderate	Starts 500 metres (1,600 ft) from the center. There are two platforms where visitors can rest and view the landscape. Vegetation is cerrado in the higher parts and Atlantic Forest lower down, with large numbers of juçara palms. Fauna include ocelots, red deer, anteaters, capybaras, parrots and hawks. There is a narrow 70 metres (230 ft) waterfall.
Chalet Trail	Santa Luzia	450 metres (1,480 ft)	Moderate	Starts 1,300 metres (4,300 ft) from the administrative headquarters and leads through typical cerrado vegetation, through meadows with isolated trees and through meadows with rocky outcroppings. There is a lookout point giving a view of part of the canyon, and a waterfall about 70 metres (230 ft) high.
Wolf Trail	Chapadão	950 metres (3,120 ft)		Leads through the cerrado biome of the center, a natural habit where wolf packs occur, as well as jaguars, ocelots, wild cats, anteaters and other mammals, and a rich diversity of reptiles and amphibians. There is a stone landing with benches at the end from which the canyon can be viewed.
Big Cascade Trail	Cascata Grande	900 metres (3,000 ft)	Low	It has a deck from which the 140 metres (460 ft) waterfall of the Bom Jesus stream can be viewed, and another deck from which the canyon through which the Bom Jesus flows through can be viewed .

== Sources ==
- AraujoI, Cybele de Oliveira; Condez, Thais Helena; Sawaya, Ricardo Jannini (April–June 2009), "Anfíbios Anuros do Parque Estadual das Furnas do Bom Jesus, sudeste do Brasil, e suas relações com outras taxocenoses no Brasil", Biota Neotropica, 9 (2), Campinas, doi:10.1590/S1676-06032009000200007, ISSN 1676-0611
- Parque Estadual das Furnas do Bom Jesus (in Portuguese), Fundação Florestal - SP
- Parque Estadual das Furnas de Bom Jesus (in Portuguese), Via Rural, archived from the original on 2017-02-04
- Parque Estadual Furnas do Bom Jesus (in Portuguese), São Paulo State
- PES das Furnas do Bom Jesus (in Portuguese), ISA: Instituto Socioambiental
