= Lucas Barreto =

Brazilian politician (born 1964)

- Official portrait

Member of the Federal Senate
- Incumbent
- Assumed office 1 February 2019
- Constituency: Amapá

Personal details
- Born: 9 November 1964 (age 61)
- Party: Social Democratic Party (since 2019)

Luiz Cantuária Barreto (born 9 November 1964), better known as Lucas Barreto, is a Brazilian politician serving as a member of the Federal Senate since 2019. From 1991 to 2006, he was a member of the Legislative Assembly of the State of Amapá.
