= Luis Furlán =

Luis Furlán

Luis Roberto Furlán Collver (born in 1948, in Guatemala City) is a Guatemalan electrical engineer.

In 1992, Luis Furlán introduced the Internet to his country, and is thus regarded in Guatemalan media as the "Father of the Internet in Guatemala".

Luis Furlán is an electrical engineer and physicist by training.
