= Pedregulho =

- Municipality
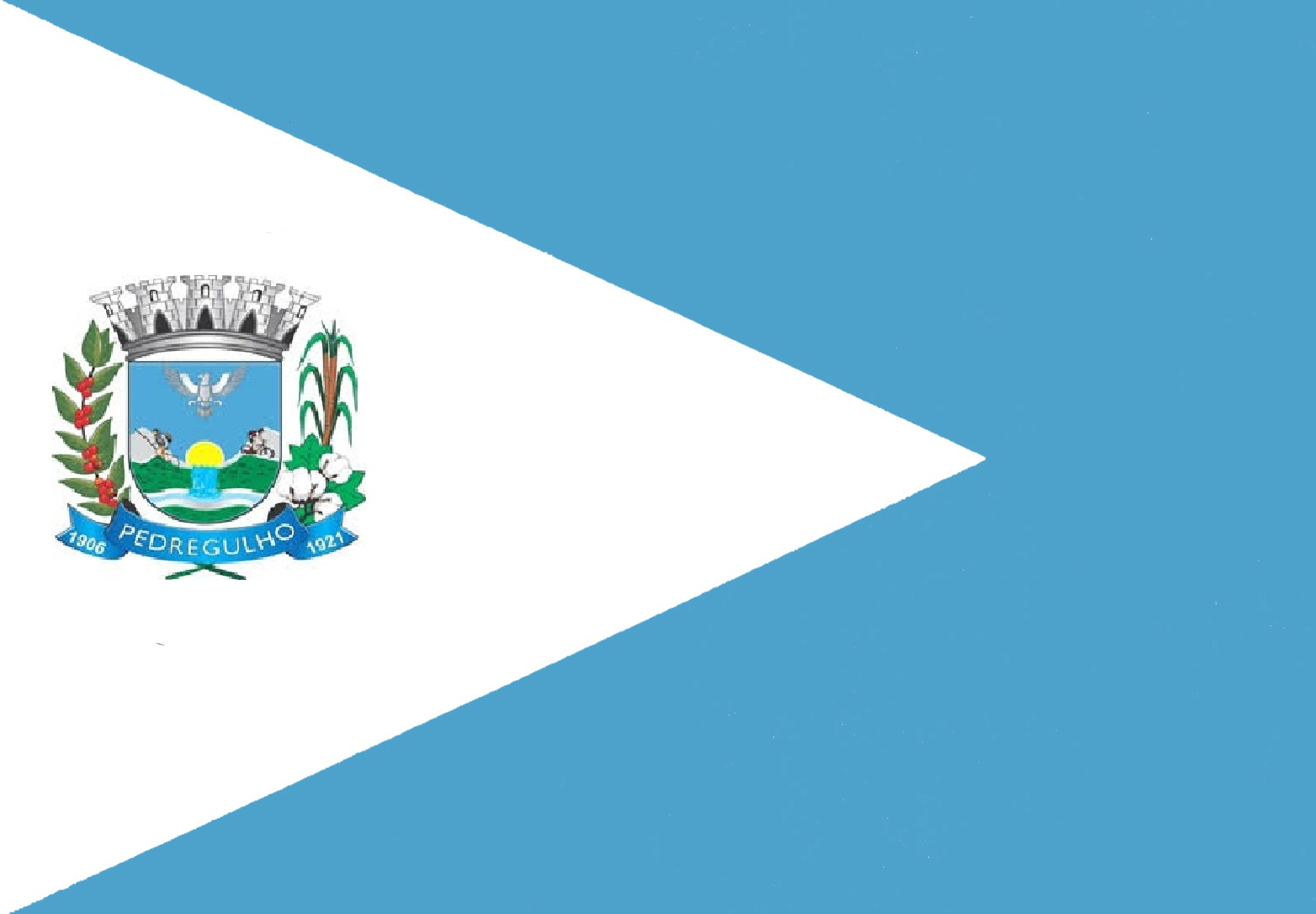
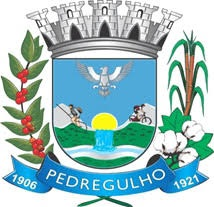
- Flag Coat of arms

- Location in São Paulo state

- Location in Brazil
- Coordinates: 20°15′25″S 47°28′36″W
- Country: Brazil
- Region: Southeast
- State: São Paulo

Area
  - Total: 713 km^{2} (275 sq mi)

Population (2020)
  - Total: 16,811
  - Density: 23.6/km^{2} (61.1/sq mi)
- Time zone: UTC−3 (BRT)

Pedregulho is a municipality in the state of São Paulo, Brazil. The elevation of Pedregulho is 1,035 metres (3,396 ft). The population is 16,811 (2020 est.) in an area of 713 km^{2}.

The municipality contains the 2,069-hectare (5,110-acre) Furnas do Bom Jesus State Park, created in 1989.

== Media ==
In telecommunications, the city was served by Telecomunicações de São Paulo. In July 1998, this company was acquired by Telefónica, which adopted the Vivo brand in 2012. The company is currently an operator of cell phones, fixed lines, internet (fiber optics/4G) and television (satellite and cable).

== See also ==
- List of municipalities in São Paulo
