= Alliny Serrão =

Brazilian politician (born 1985)

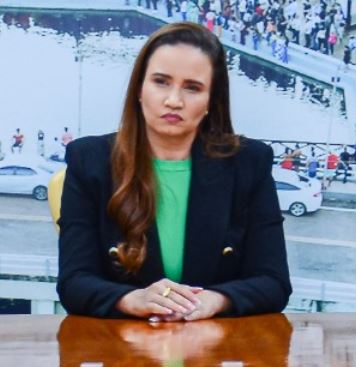
- Serrão in 2024

President of the Legislative Assembly of Amapá
- Incumbent
- Assumed office 2 February 2023
- Preceded by: Kaká Barbosa

Personal details
- Born: 11 February 1985 (age 41)
- Party: Brazil Union (since 2022)

Alliny Sousa da Rocha Serrão (born 11 February 1985) is a Brazilian politician. She has been a member of the Legislative Assembly of Amapá since 2019, and has served as president of the assembly since 2023. From 2013 to 2017, she was a municipal councillor of Laranjal do Jari.
