= João Capiberibe =

Brazilian politician

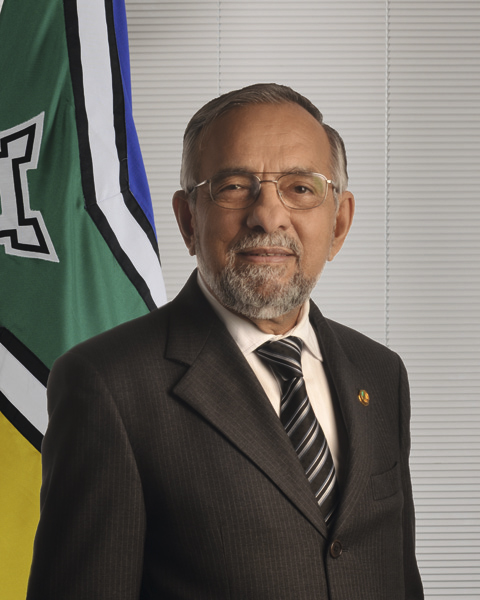

Senator from Amapá
- Incumbent
- Assumed office November 29, 2011
- In office October 28, 2005 – October 14, 2010
- In office February 1, 2003 – April 28, 2004

Governor of Amapá
- In office January 1, 1995 – April 1, 2002
- Vice Governor: Ildegardo Alencar (1995–1999); Dalva Figueiredo (1999–2002)
- Preceded by: Annibal Barcellos
- Succeeded by: Dalva Figueiredo

Personal details
- Born: João Alberto Rodrigues Capiberibe; May 6, 1947 (age 78) Afuá, PA, Brazil
- Party: PSB (Since 1988)
- Spouse: Janete Capiberibe (m. 1969)
- Children: Camilo Capiberibe
- Occupation: Politician
- Profession: Zootechnist

João Alberto Rodrigues Capiberibe (born May 6, 1947 in Afuá) is a Brazilian politician. He was a Brazilian senator from November 29, 2011 to February 1, 2019.

Capiberibe served as governor from January 1, 1995 to April 1, 2002. He resigned to passing government's range to vice governor, Dalva Figueiredo of the Workers' Party, to run to the senate.

== See also ==
- List of mayors of Macapá
