= Rayssa Furlan =

Brazilian politician (born 1987)

- Furlan in 2025

Member of the Senate
- Incumbent
- Assumed office 1 February 2027
- Constituency: Amapá

Personal details
- Born: 8 February 1987 (age 39)
- Party: Podemos
- Spouse: Antônio Furlan

Rayssa Cadena Furlan (born 8 February 1987) is a Brazilian politician who was elected member of the Senate in 2026. She is married to Antônio Furlan. From 2021 to 2026, she served as first lady of Macapá.
