= Sergio Furlan =

Italian sailor (born 1940)

Sergio Furlan (born 29 February 1940) is an Italian former sailor who competed in the 1964 Summer Olympics. Aged 24, he represented Italy in the Mixed Three Person Keelboat where his team placed 6th.
