= 16 de Abril =

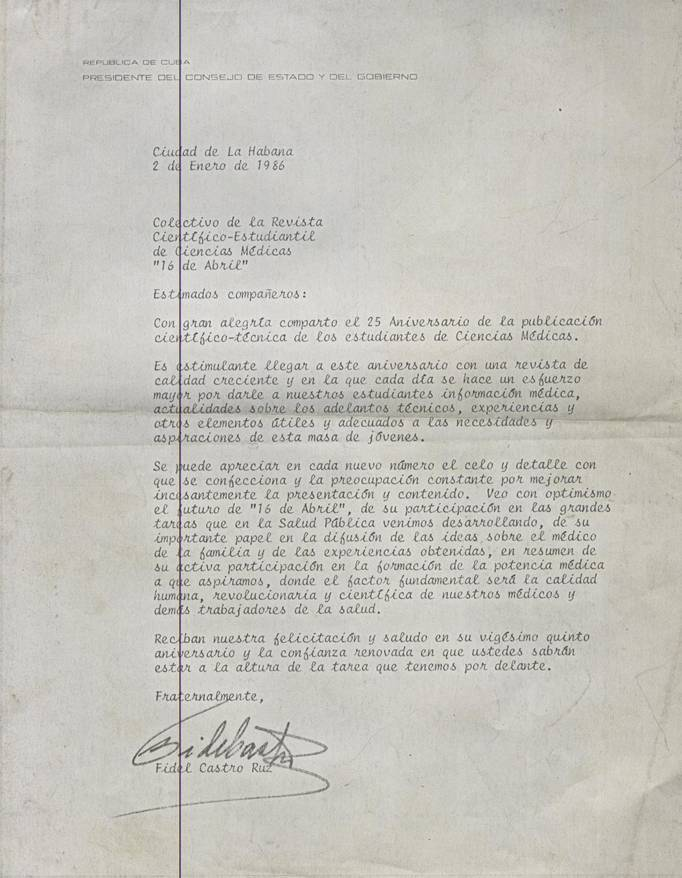
- Letter of congratulation from Fidel Castro on the 25th anniversary of 16 de Abril
- Editor and director: Kenia Alvarez
- Former editors: Rodolfo Soca Pasaron
- Categories: Science
- First issue: Summer 1961
- Country: Cuba
- Based in: Havana
- Language: Spanish
- Website: https://www.16deabril.sld.cu
- ISSN: 0138-645X

16 de Abril is the Cuban Journal of Medical Students. It was created in 1961 as a political magazine for medical students in the medicine school of University of Havana. According to some founders, the magazine was conceived during a public speech of the Cuban president Fidel Castro on April 16, 1961, and published for first time in the summer of the same year. Among the founders of the magazine are Julio Tejas, Daniel Inclan, and Jose Fernandez.

After 1964 the magazine changed its style adding more scientific content and gradually cutting of the political content. In 1984, under the guidance of former director Dr. Liliana Pereira, the magazine expanded its coverage to all the medical students in Cuba and it also experienced an economic boom.

During almost 40 years the magazines was distributed to medical students and professionals in Cuba. Under the guidance of former director, Dagoberto Semanat, the magazine introduced its first website, made by the Peruvian-Cuban Carlos Erick Oyola Valdizán. After the economical crisis in Cuba in the 90's, the Journal changed to a digital format. Due to the lack of economic resources and political problems, the journal lost its momentum.

Former director Rodolfo Soca Pasaron led an important movement to re-introduce the journal into the national scene. Under his direction and during the first years of the century, the journal became the reference institution for Scientific Research for medical students.

16 de Abril publishes original articles for Cuban medical students and has some control over scientific events. It is directed and edited by Kenia Alvarez.
