= Camilo Capiberibe =

Brazilian politician (born 1972)

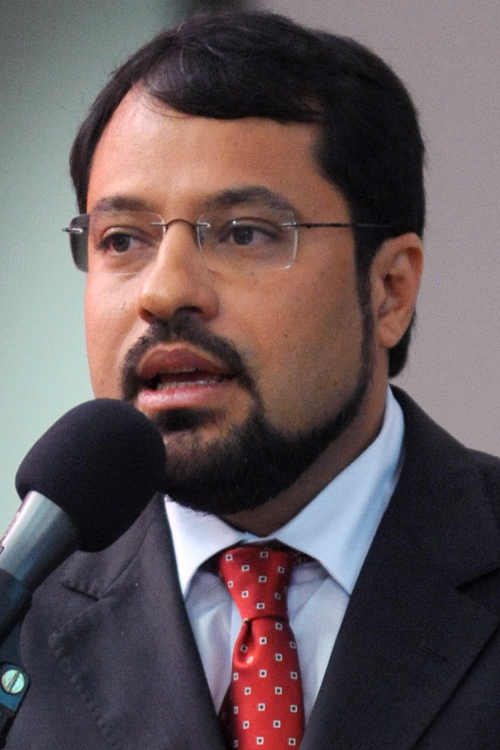

Governor of Amapá
- In office 1 January 2011 – 1 January 2015
- Vice Governor: Dora Nascimento
- Preceded by: Pedro Paulo Dias
- Succeeded by: Waldez Góes

Member of the Chamber of Deputies
- In office 1 February 2019 – 1 February 2023
- Constituency: Amapá

Member of the Legislative Assembly of Amapá
- In office 1 February 2007 – 1 January 2011
- Constituency: At-large

Personal details
- Born: Carlos Camilo Góes Capiberibe; 23 May 1972 (age 54) Santiago, Chile
- Party: PT (since 2026)
- Relatives: João Capiberibe (father)
- Education: Pontifical Catholic University of Campinas

Carlos Camilo Góes Capiberibe (born 23 May 1972) is a Brazilian politician. He was the Governor of the Brazilian state of Amapá from 2011 to 2015

== Personal life ==
Capiberibe is the son of zoologist João Capiberibe and teacher Janete Capiberibe. He is an alumnus of the Pontifical Catholic University of Campinas, and has a master's degree from Université de Montréal. Both his parents have ties to politics, with his mother also serving as federal deputy and his father being the past governor of Amapá.

His parents were involved in the socialist movement before his birth but fled to Chile after the 1964 Brazilian coup d'état, where Carlos and his twin sister Luciana was born. He also has a younger sister named Artionka who is an anthropologist. With the 1973 Chilean coup d'état and overthrow of Salvador Allende by Augusto Pinochet, his family fled again this time to Canada.

In his youth Capiberibe was part of several university student political groups, including the Aliança Nacional Libertadora (ANL) or National Liberating Alliance. After graduating from university he became the secretary of organization of the state executive of the Brazilian Socialist Party.

== Political career ==
In 2006 he was elected to the state legislature of Amapá with 5,213.

In 2010 Capiberibe ran for governor in the state of Amapá. In the first round he received 28% of the vote. In the second round, on 31 October 2010 he won more than 170,000 votes, the largest vote in state history for a gubernatorial candidate, and with 53.77% of the vote became governor.

In the 2018 Brazilian general election Capiberibe announced that he was running for the national chamber of federal deputies.

Political offices
Preceded by Pedro Paulo Dias	Governor of Amapá; 2011–2015	Succeeded by Waldez Góes
