= Clécio Luís =

Brazilian politician (born 1972)

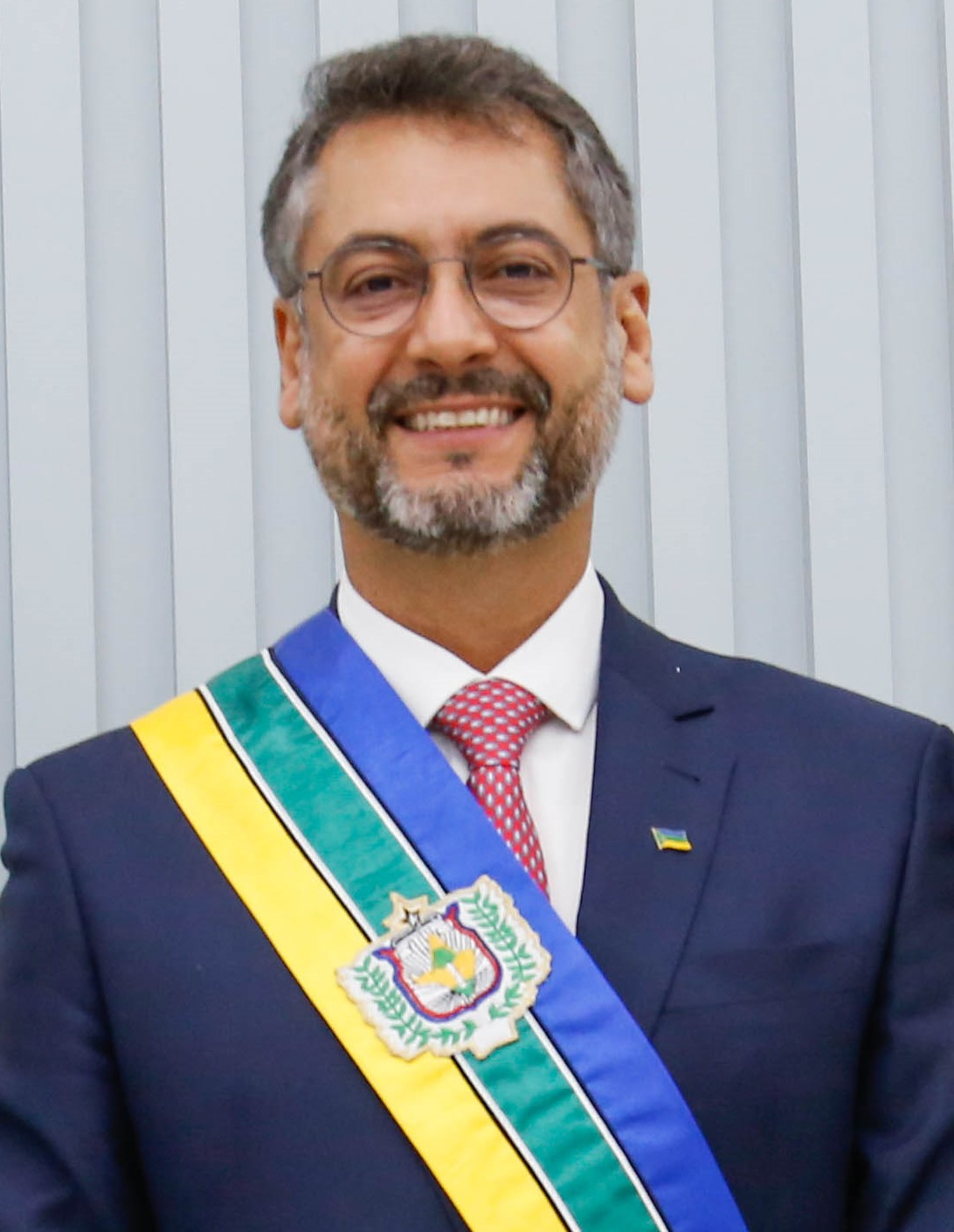
- Luís in 2023

Governor of Amapá
- Incumbent
- Assumed office 1 January 2023
- Vice Governor: Teles Junior
- Preceded by: Waldez Góes

Mayor of Macapá
- In office 1 January 2013 – 31 December 2020
- Preceded by: Roberto Góes
- Succeeded by: Antônio Furlan

Personal details
- Born: 8 April 1972 (age 54)
- Party: UNIÃO (since 2026)
- Other political affiliations: PT (1989–2005); PSOL (2005–2016); REDE (2016–2020); Solidarity (2022–2026)

Clécio Luís Vilhena Vieira (born 8 April 1972) is a Brazilian politician serving as governor of Amapá since 2023. From 2013 to 2020, he served as mayor of Macapá.
