= Antônio Furlan =

Brazilian politician (born 1973)

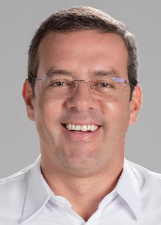
- Furlan in 2024

Governor-elect of Amapá
- Assuming office 6 January 2027
- Vice Governor: Luciana Gurgel (elect)
- Succeeding: Clécio Luís

Mayor of Macapá
- In office 1 January 2021 – 5 March 2026
- Deputy: Mônica Penha (2021–2025); Mário Neto (2025–2026)
- Preceded by: Clécio Luís
- Succeeded by: Pedro DaLua (acting)

Personal details
- Born: Antônio Paulo de Oliveira Furlan; 9 July 1973 (age 53)
- Party: PSD (since 2026)
- Other political affiliations: PTB (2009–2019); Cidadania (2019–2023); PODE (2023–2024); MDB (2024–2026)
- Spouse: Rayssa Furlan

Antônio Paulo de Oliveira Furlan (born 9 July 1973) is a Brazilian politician serving as mayor of Macapá since 2021. From 2015 to 2020, he was a member of the Legislative Assembly of Amapá.

Political offices
Preceded by Clécio Luís	Mayor of Macapá; 2021–2026	Succeeded by Pedro Dalua (acting)
Preceded by Clécio Luís	Governor of Amapá; Taking office 2027	Elect
