= Papaléo Paes =

Brazilian politician and physician (1952–2020)

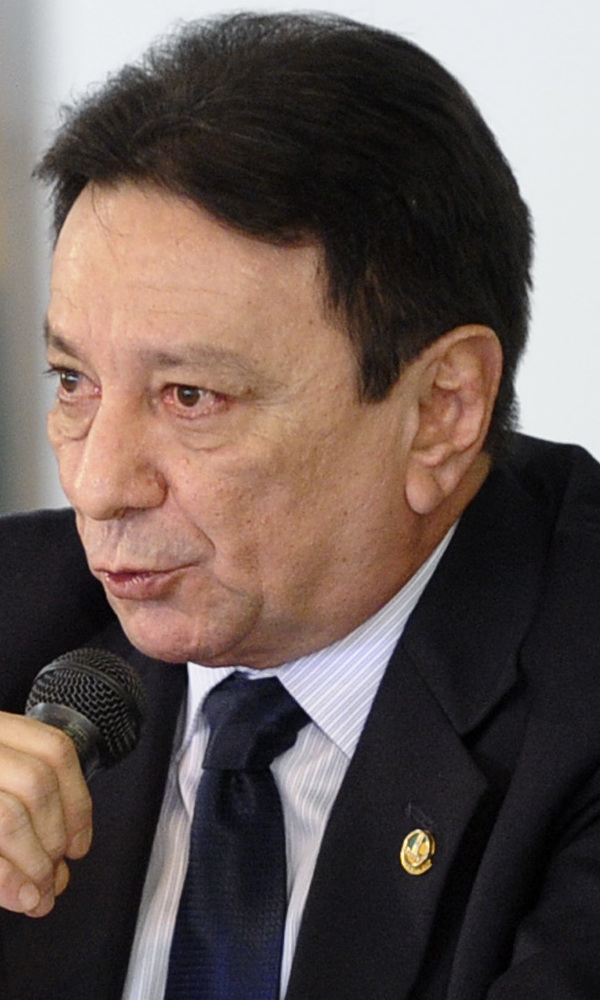

Vice governor of Amapá
- In office 2015–2018
- Governor: Waldez Góes
- Preceded by: Dora Nascimento
- Succeeded by: Jaime Nunes

Senator for Amapá
- In office 2003–2011

Mayor of Macapá
- In office 1993–1996
- Preceded by: João Capiberibe
- Succeeded by: Aníbal Barcelos

Health Secretary of Amapá
- In office 1992–1993
- Governor: Aníbal Barcelos

Personal details
- Born: August 27, 1952 Belém, Pará, Brazil
- Died: June 25, 2020 (aged 67) Macapá, Amapá, Brazil
- Party: Progressistas (PP)
- Other political affiliations: PRONA (1989–1991); PSDB (1991–1999 and 2005–2013); PTB (1999–2003); PMDB (2003–2005)
- Education: Federal University of Pará
- Profession: Politician, physician, cardiologist

João Bosco Papaléo Paes (27 August 1952 – 25 June 2020), better known simply as Papaléo Paes, was a Brazilian politician and physician from the state of Pará who represented the state of Amapá at national level.

== Career ==
Before pursuing a career in politics, Paes graduated as a Physician at the Federal University of Pará and later specialized in Cardiology in Rio de Janeiro.

He worked at the Hospital Geral de Macapá at a management level and in 1992 was appointed Health Secretary of Amapá.

In 1992, Paes was elected Mayor of Macapá and remained in charge between 1993 and 1996.

In 2000, he decided to run again at Macapá's mayoral election. This time however, he failed to secure enough votes to be elected.

In 2002, he was elected Senator representing the state of Amapá. His tenure lasted from 2003 to 2011.

In 2006, he ran at the Amapá state elections, but failed to secure enough votes to be elected Governor.

In 2014, Paes was elected Vice governor of Amapá. He kept his post from 2015 to 2018.

== Personal life and death ==
Paes was married to Josélia Martins Papaléo Paes and had two daughters, Juliana and Jacyra.

On 25 June 2020, Paes died in Macapá at the age of 67 from complications brought on by COVID-19 during the COVID-19 pandemic in Brazil.
