= List of governors of Amapá =

This is the list of governors of the Brazilian state of Amapá.

== Elected governors ==
Amapá has held direct elections for governor since 1990.

#	Name	Took office	Left office	Party	Notes	Photo
1	Annibal Barcellos	January 1, 1991	December 31, 1994	PTB	First elected governor of Amapá.	none available
2	João Capiberibe	January 1, 1995	December 31, 1998	PSB	First re-elected governor of Amapá. Resigned before the end of his second term to run for another office.	
2	João Capiberibe	January 1, 1999	April 1, 2002	PSB	First re-elected governor of Amapá. Resigned before the end of his second term to run for another office.	
3	Dalva de Souza Figueiredo	April 1, 2002	December 31, 2002	PT	Elected as lieutenant-governor, took the main office after her predecessor resigned.	none available
4	Waldez Góes	January 1, 2003	December 31, 2006	PDT	Resigned before the end of his second term to run for another office.	
4	Waldez Góes	January 1, 2007	April 4, 2010	PDT	Resigned before the end of his second term to run for another office.	
5	Pedro Paulo Dias de Carvalho	April 4, 2010	December 31, 2010	PP	Elected as lieutenant-governor, took the main office after his predecessor resigned.	
6	Camilo Capiberibe	January 1, 2011	December 31, 2014	PSB	Son of João Capiberibe, who was also governor of Amapá, was elected on the 2nd round in 2010	
7	Waldez Góes	January 1, 2015	December 31, 2018	PDT	Elected to a third term.	
7	Waldez Góes	January 1, 2019	December 31, 2022	PDT	Elected to a fourth term.	
8	Clécio Luís	January 1, 2023	Present	Solidarity	Elected on 1st round in 2022.	

== See also ==
- Politics of Amapá
