= Pontifical Catholic University of Campinas =

University in São Paulo, Brazil

- Pontifícia Universidade Católica de Campinas
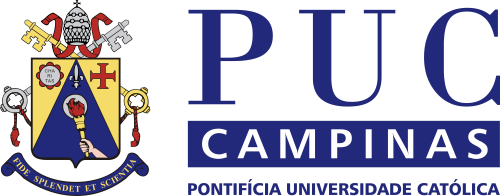
- Other name: PUC-Campinas
- Motto: Fide splendet et scientia
- Motto in English: May it shine with truth and knowledge
- Type: Private, non-profit
- Established: November 21, 1941
- Affiliations: Roman Catholic Church
- Chancellor: Angela de Mendonça Engelbrecht
- Rector: Germano Rigacci Júnior
- Vice rector: Eduard Prancic
- Faculty: 2,565
- Students: 19,689
- Location: Campinas, São Paulo, Brazil; 22.8346°S 47.0476°W
- Campus: Urban
- Website: www.puc-campinas.edu.br

The Pontifical Catholic University of Campinas (Portuguese: Pontifícia Universidade Católica de Campinas, PUC-Campinas) is a private and non-profit Catholic university, located in Campinas, the second largest city in the State of São Paulo. The university is maintained by the Catholic Archdiocese of Campinas.

== History ==
Founded in June 1941, with the first college teaching Philosophy, Science and Literature, it became a full university in 1955. The title of Pontifical University was granted by Pope Paul VI in 1972.

With three campuses in Campinas, the university has approximately 20,000 students enrolled in undergraduate and graduate programs. Undergraduate programs comprise business administration, system analysis, architecture, arts, accounting, biology, medicine, information science and library science, economics, theology, pharmacy, law, social sciences, literature, physical education, nursing, dentistry, physical therapy, speech therapy, nutrition science, engineering (civil, electrical, environmental, sanitary and computing), philosophy, geography, journalism, history, pedagogy, psychology, publicity, public relations, international relations, chemistry, social services, occupational therapy and tourism.

The schools are Centre for Economics and Business Administration (CEA), Centre for Mathematical, Environmental and Technology Sciences (CEATEC), Centre for Applied Social and Human Sciences (CCHSA), including the college of Law, and Centre for Language and Communication (CLC).

On the same campus is the Celso Pierro Hospital and Maternity (HMCP), which has 340 beds and 35 medical specialties. Every year, 450 thousand patients are treated by the Unified Health System (SUS). PUC-Campinas and the University of São Paulo are the best universities in Brazil when it comes to Health.

The Celso Pierro Hospital has 340 beds, being 240 for the covenant of the Unified Health System (SUS) and 100 for HMOs and private individuals distributed in inpatient units.

== See also ==
- Brazil University Rankings
- Universities and Higher Education in Brazil
