= Cambará =

Coordinates: 23.0458°S 50.0739°W

- Municipality
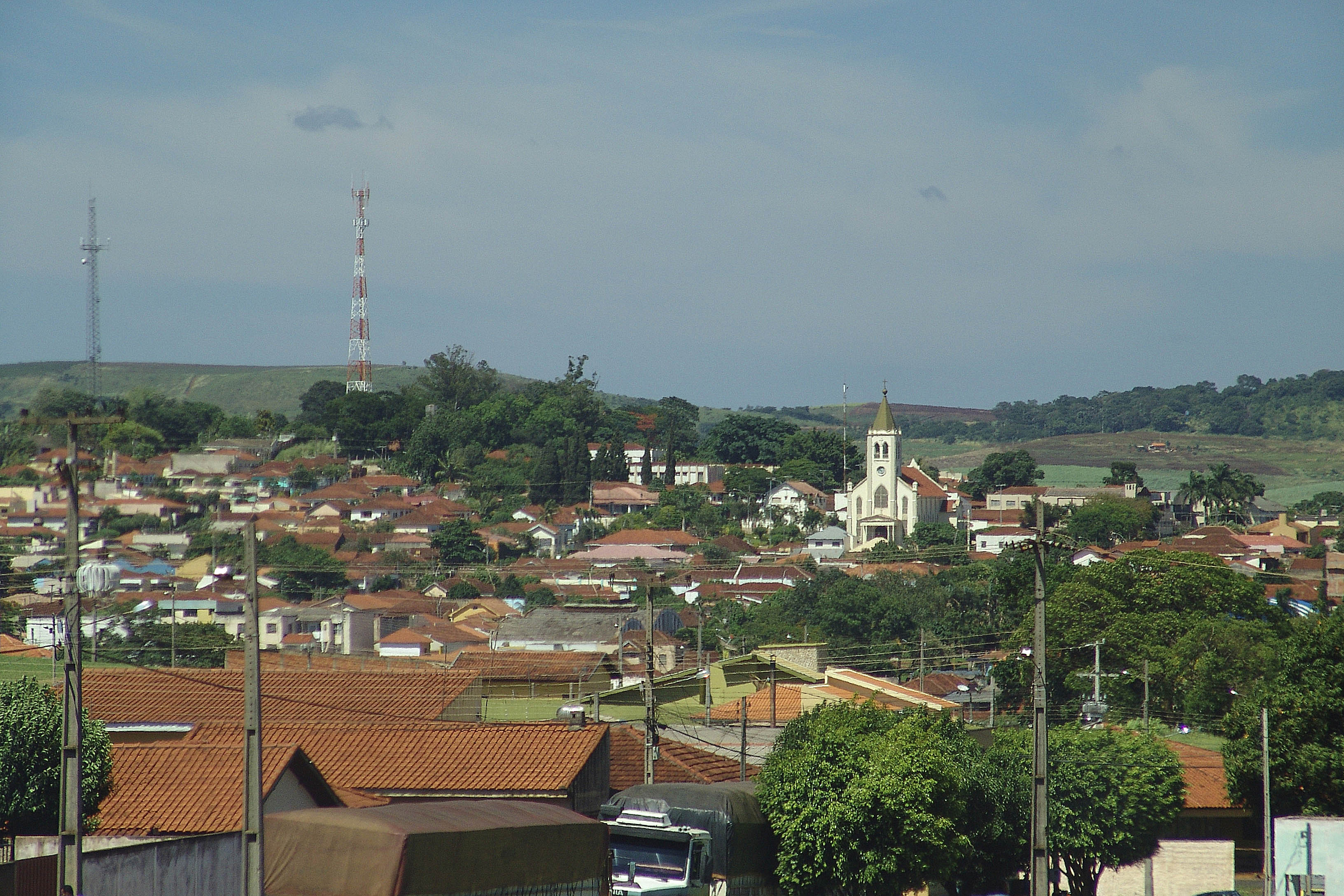

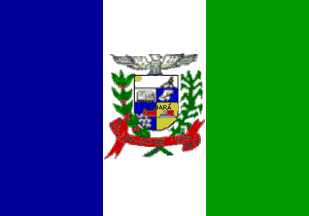
- Flag Coat of arms
- Interactive map of Cambará
- Country: Brazil
- Region: Southern
- State: Paraná
- Mesoregion: Norte Pioneiro Paranaense

Population (2020)
  - Total: 25,466
- Time zone: UTC−3 (BRT)

Cambará is a municipality in the state of Paraná in the Southern Region of Brazil.

== Climate ==
Climate data for Cambará, elevation 450 m (1,480 ft), (1976–2005 normals, extremes 1957–2010)
Month	Jan	Feb	Mar	Apr	May	Jun	Jul	Aug	Sep	Oct	Nov	Dec	Year
Record high °C (°F)	37.9 (100.2)	37.4 (99.3)	37.6 (99.7)	36.0 (96.8)	34.0 (93.2)	31.8 (89.2)	33.6 (92.5)	36.0 (96.8)	39.0 (102.2)	39.0 (102.2)	41.1 (106.0)	38.5 (101.3)	41.1 (106.0)
Mean daily maximum °C (°F)	30.8 (87.4)	31.0 (87.8)	30.6 (87.1)	29.0 (84.2)	26.0 (78.8)	24.9 (76.8)	25.3 (77.5)	27.5 (81.5)	28.3 (82.9)	29.7 (85.5)	30.4 (86.7)	30.5 (86.9)	28.7 (83.6)
Daily mean °C (°F)	24.3 (75.7)	24.2 (75.6)	23.6 (74.5)	21.5 (70.7)	18.3 (64.9)	16.8 (62.2)	16.6 (61.9)	18.7 (65.7)	20.4 (68.7)	22.3 (72.1)	23.4 (74.1)	24.0 (75.2)	21.2 (70.1)
Mean daily minimum °C (°F)	19.8 (67.6)	19.8 (67.6)	18.7 (65.7)	16.1 (61.0)	12.8 (55.0)	11.3 (52.3)	10.8 (51.4)	12.2 (54.0)	14.5 (58.1)	16.9 (62.4)	18.0 (64.4)	19.3 (66.7)	15.9 (60.5)
Record low °C (°F)	12.1 (53.8)	13.0 (55.4)	6.8 (44.2)	4.0 (39.2)	−1.0 (30.2)	−2.6 (27.3)	−3.7 (25.3)	−3.5 (25.7)	1.3 (34.3)	6.4 (43.5)	7.7 (45.9)	9.4 (48.9)	−3.7 (25.3)
Average precipitation mm (inches)	190.4 (7.50)	195.4 (7.69)	178.4 (7.02)	94.1 (3.70)	93.6 (3.69)	76.8 (3.02)	46.7 (1.84)	43.6 (1.72)	93.4 (3.68)	125.7 (4.95)	150.2 (5.91)	188.9 (7.44)	1,477.2 (58.16)
Average precipitation days (≥ 1.0 mm)	15	13	13	7	7	6	5	5	7	10	10	14	112
Average relative humidity (%)	84	84	84	84	83	83	81	76	81	82	80	81	82
Mean monthly sunshine hours	198.7	186.3	219.1	226.1	216.7	207.7	227.0	237.4	192.4	214.9	221.0	201.5	2,548.8
Source 1: Empresa Brasileira de Pesquisa Agropecuária (EMBRAPA)
Source 2: IDR-Paraná (precipitation days and sun 1957–2010)

== See also ==
- List of municipalities in Paraná
