= Teles Junior =

Brazilian politician (born 1983)

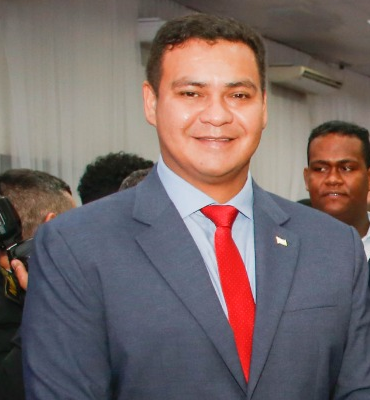

Vice Governor of Amapá
- Incumbent
- Assumed office 1 January 2023
- Governor: Clécio Luís
- Preceded by: Jaime Nunes

Personal details
- Born: 20 June 1983 (age 42)
- Party: Democratic Labour Party (since 2018)

Antônio Pinheiro Teles Júnior (born 20 June 1983) is a Brazilian politician serving as vice governor of Amapá since 2023. From 2015 to 2018, he served as secretary of planning of Amapá. From 2019 to 2021, he served as secretary of urban development of Amapá.
