= Ruy Novaes =

Brazilian politician

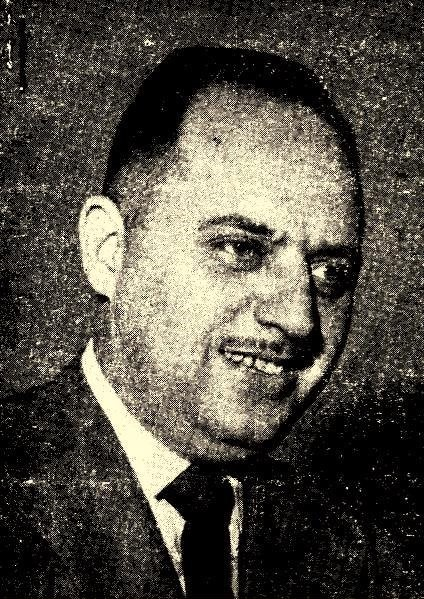
Ruy Hellmeister Novaes

Ruy Hellmeister Novais was a Brazilian politician from Campinas. He was twice elected mayor of the city, from 1956 to 1959 and from 1964 to 1969. During his second mandate he was noted for promoting a comprehensive modernization program of the city's infrastructure, including the modern municipal administration building.
