= Legislative Assembly of the State of Amapá =

Legislative Assembly of the State of Amapá Assembleia Legislativa do Estado do Amapá
- 9th Legislature

Type
- Type: Unicameral

Leadership
- President: Alliny Serrão, UNIÃO since 2 February 2023
- 1st VP: Jaime Perez, PRD
- 1st Secretary: Edna Auzier, PSD

Structure
- Political groups: PDT (3) Solidarity (3) UNIÃO (3) Brazil of Hope (2) (Note: PCdoB (1) PV (1)) MDB (2) PL (2) PSD (2) REDE (2) Cidadania (1) Podemos (1) PP (1) PRD (1) Republicans (1)

Elections
- Voting system: Proportional representation
- Last election: 2 October 2022
- Next election: 2026

Website
- www.al.ap.leg.br

The Legislative Assembly of the State of Amapá (Portuguese: Assembleia Legislativa do Amapá) is the legislative body of the government of the state of Amapá in Brazil.

It is composed of 24 state deputies. It is located in Macapá, Amapá.

== See also ==
- Politics of Amapá
