= 1999 in Brazil =

Events in the year 1999 in Brazil.

== Incumbents ==
=== Federal government ===
- President: Fernando Henrique Cardoso
- Vice President: Marco Maciel

=== Governors ===
- Acre:
  - Orleir Messias Cameli (until 1 January)
  - Jorge Viana (from 1 January)
- Alagoas:
  - Manoel Gomes de Barros (Mano) (until 1 January)
  - Ronaldo Lessa (from 1 January)
- Amapa: João Capiberibe
- Amazonas: Amazonino Mendes
- Bahia:
  - Paulo Souto (until 1 January)
  - César Borges (from 1 January)
- Ceará: Tasso Jereissati
- Espírito Santo:
  - Vitor Buaiz (until 1 January)
  - José Ignácio Ferreira (from 1 January)
- Goiás:
  - Helenês Cândido (until 1 January)
  - Marconi Perillo (from 1 January)
- Maranhão: Roseana Sarney
- Mato Grosso: Dante de Oliveira
- Mato Grosso do Sul: José Orcírio Miranda dos Santos (from 1 January)
- Minas Gerais:
  - Eduardo Brandão Azeredo (until 1 January)
  - Itamar Franco (from 1 January)
- Pará: Almir Gabriel
- Paraíba: José Maranhão
- Paraná: Jaime Lerner
- Pernambuco:
  - Miguel Arraes (until 1 January)
  - Jarbas Vasconcelos (from 1 January)
- Piauí: Mão Santa
- Rio de Janeiro:
  - Marcello Alencar (until 1 January)
  - Benedita da Silva (from 1 January)
- Rio Grande do Norte: Garibaldi Alves Filho
- Rio Grande do Sul:
  - Antônio Britto (until 1 January)
  - Olívio Dutra (from 1 January)
- Rondônia: José de Abreu Bianco
- Roraima: Neudo Ribeiro Campos
- Santa Catarina:
  - Paulo Afonso Vieira (until 1 January)
  - Esperidião Amin (from 1 January)
- São Paulo: Mário Covas
- Sergipe: Albano Franco
- Tocantins: José Wilson Siqueira Campos (from 1 January)

=== Vice governors ===
- Acre:
  - Labib Murad (until 1 January)
  - Edison Simão Cadaxo (from 1 January)
- Alagoas: Geraldo Costa Sampaio (from 1 January)
- Amapá:
  - Antônio Hildegardo Gomes de Alencar (until 1 January)
  - Maria Dalva de Souza Figueiredo (from 1 January)
- Amazonas: Samuel Assayag Hanan (from 1 January)
- Bahia:
  - César Borges (until 1 January)
  - Otto Alencar (from 1 January)
- Ceará:
  - Moroni Bing Torgan (until 1 January)
  - Benedito Clayton Veras Alcântara (from 1 January)
- Espírito Santo
  - José Renato Casagrande (until 1 January)
  - Celso José Vasconcelos (from 1 January)
- Goiás: Alcides Rodrigues Filho (from 1 January)
- Maranhão: José Reinaldo Carneiro Tavares
- Mato Grosso:
  - José Márcio Panoff de Lacerda (until 1 January)
  - José Rogério Sales (from 1 January)
- Mato Grosso do Sul:
  - Vacant (until 1 January)
  - Moacir Kohl (from 1 January)
- Minas Gerais:
  - Walfrido Silvino dos Mares Guia Neto (until 1 January)
  - Newton Cardoso (from 1 January)
- Pará:
  - Hélio Mota Gueiros Júnior (until 1 January)
  - Hildegardo de Figueiredo Nunes (from 1 January)
- Paraíba: Antônio Roberto de Sousa Paulino
- Paraná: Emília de Sales Belinati
- Pernambuco:
  - Jorge José Gomes (until 1 January)
  - José Mendonça Bezerra Filho (from 1 January)
- Piauí:
  - Osmar Antônio de Araújo (until 1 January)
  - Osmar Ribeiro de Almeida Júnior (from 1 January)
- Rio de Janeiro:
  - Luiz Paulo Correa da Rocha (until 1 January)
  - Benedita da Silva (from 1 January)
- Rio Grande do Norte: Fernando Freire
- Rio Grande do Sul:
  - Vicente Joaquim Bogo (until 1 January)
  - Miguel Soldatelli Rossetto (from 1 January)
- Rondônia:
  - Aparício Carvalho de Moraes (until 1 January)
  - Miguel de Souza (from 1 January)
- Roraima:
  - Airton Antonio Soligo (until 1 January)
  - Francisco Flamarion Portela (from 1 January)
- Santa Catarina:
  - José Augusto Hülse (until 1 January)
  - Paulo Roberto Bauer (from 1 January)
- São Paulo: Geraldo Alckmin
- Sergipe:
  - José Carlos Machado (until 1 January)
  - Benedito de Figueiredo (from 1 January)
- Tocantins:
  - Raimundo Nonato Pires dos Santos (until 1 January)
  - João Lisboa da Cruz (from 1 January)

== Events ==
=== January ===
- January 1: Fernando Henrique Cardoso begins his second term as president of Brazil.
- January 24: Central Station by Walter Salles, wins the Golden Globe Award for Best Foreign Language Film.

=== February ===
- February 1: Antônio Carlos Magalhães (PFL/BA) and Michel Temer (PMDB/SP) are re-elected, respectively, as presidents of the Federal Senate and the Chamber of Deputies.

=== March ===
- March 11: A blackout affects the Federal District, as well as ten states in the South, Southeast, and Central-West regions.
- March 21: After 94 days, the kidnapping of Wellington Camargo (brother of the country duo Zezé di Camargo & Luciano) ends. Camargo was found in a bush on the side of a road in Guapó and the kidnappers were arrested.
- March 22: The newspaper Agora São Paulo is launched to replace Folha da Tarde.

=== May ===
- May 10th: The television network Rede Manchete ceases broadcasting, due to a growing decrease in audience, excessive interest on the station's debt and that of the Bloch Group; management failures and salary arrears since the previous year. The network later becomes RedeTV!.

=== June ===
- June 6: In São José dos Campos, 345 prisoners escape from Putim prison through the front gate.

=== July ===
- July 18: Brazil defeats Uruguay 3-0, earning their sixth Copa América championship.
- July 26 - Truckers go on a national strike for four days in a row. Drivers claimed toll tariff reduction, tax exemption and retirement regulation.

=== September ===
- September 29: Francisco de Assis Pereira, "The Park Maniac", is sentenced to 121 years in prison for the death of ten women in the State Park, in São Paulo.

=== November ===
- November 3: Mateus da Costa Meira, a 24-year old medical student, kills 3 people in a theater with a submachine gun.

=== December ===
- December 11: Unsuccessful launch of VLS-1 V02 occurs.

== Births ==
=== January ===
- 14 January: Emerson Royal, footballer

=== March ===
- 27 May: Matheus Cunha, footballer

=== August ===
- 13 August: Giulia Be, singer
- 15 August: Paola Reis, BMX rider

=== September ===
- 13 September: Açucena, politician

=== October ===
- 8 October: Camila Rossi, rhythmic gymnast

=== December ===
- 28 December: Ary Borges, footballer

== Deaths ==
=== March ===
- 7 March: Antônio Houaiss, writer and lexicographer (born 1915)
- 12 March: Bidu Sayão, opera singer (born 1902)
- 24 March: Ladjane Bandeira, journalist and artist (born 1927)

=== April ===
- 1 April: Marcos Rey, writer (born 1925)

=== May ===
- 18 May: Dias Gomes, dramatist (born 1922)
- 22 May: Milton Banana, bossa nova and jazz drummer (born 1935)
- 29 May: João Carlos de Oliveira, athlete (born 1954)

=== June ===
- 12 June: Carlos Kroeber, actor (born 1934)
- 19 June: Heloísa Helena, actress (born 1917)

=== July ===
- 16 July: Franco Montoro, politician (born 1916)

=== August ===
- 27 August: Hélder Câmara, Catholic archbishop (born 1909)

=== October ===
- 8 October:
  - Manfredo Fest, bossa nova and jazz pianist (born 1936)
  - Zezé Macedo, comedian and actress (born 1916)
- 30 October: Nise da Silveira, psychiatrist and student of Carl Jung (born 1905)

=== November ===
- 19 November: Plínio Marcos, writer and actor (born 1935)
- 22 November: Flávio Costa, football player and coach (born 1906)

=== December ===
- 3 December: Edmond Safra, Lebanese-born banker (born 1932)
- 8 December: Toninho, footballer (born 1948)
- 24 December: João Figueiredo, 30th President of Brazil (born 1918)
- 29 December: José Cláudio dos Reis, sports administrator (born 1939)

== See also ==
- 1999 in Brazilian football
- 1999 in Brazilian television
