= 1995 in Brazil =

Events in the year 1995 in Brazil.

== Incumbents ==
=== Federal government ===
- President: Fernando Henrique Cardoso
- Vice President: Marco Maciel

=== Governors ===
- Acre: Orleir Messias Cameli (from 1 January)
- Alagoas:
  - Geraldo Bulhões (until 1 January)
  - Divaldo Suruagy (from 1 January)
- Amapa: João Capiberibe (from 1 January)
- Amazonas:
  - Gilberto Mestrinho (until 1 January)
  - Amazonino Mendes (from 1 January)
- Bahia: Paulo Souto (from 1 January)
- Ceará:
  - Francisco Aguiar (until 1 January)
  - Tasso Jereissati (from 1 January)
- Espírito Santo:
  - Albuíno Cunha de Azeredo (until 1 January)
  - Vitor Buaiz (from 1 January)
- Goiás:
  - Agenor Rezende (until 1 January)
  - Maguito Vilela (from 1 January)
- Maranhão:
  - José de Ribamar Fiquene (until 1 January)
  - Roseana Sarney (from 1 January)
- Mato Grosso: Dante de Oliveira
- Mato Grosso do Sul: Wilson Barbosa Martins (from 1 January)
- Minas Gerais:
  - Hélio Garcia (until 1 January)
  - Eduardo Brandão Azeredo (from 1 January)
- Pará:
  - Carlos Santos (until 1 January)
  - Almir Gabriel (from 1 January)
- Paraíba:
  - Cícero de Lucena (until 1 January)
  - Antônio Mariz (1 January-16 September)
  - José Maranhão (from 16 September)
- Paraná:
  - Mário Pereira (until 1 January)
  - Jaime Lerner (from 1 January)
- Pernambuco:
  - Joaquim Francisco Cavalcanti (until 1 January)
  - Miguel Arraes (from 1 January)
- Piauí:
  - Guilherme Melo (until 1 January)
  - Mão Santa (from 1 January)
- Rio de Janeiro:
  - Nilo Batista (until 1 January)
  - Marcello Alencar (from 1 January)
- Rio Grande do Norte:
  - Vivaldo Costa (until 1 January)
  - Garibaldi Alves Filho (from 1 January)
- Rio Grande do Sul:
  - Alceu de Deus Collares (until 1 January)
  - Antônio Britto (from 1 January)
- Rondônia:
  - Oswaldo Piana Filho (until 1 January)
  - Valdir Raupp de Mattos (from 1 January)
- Roraima:
  - Ottomar de Sousa Pinto (until 1 January)
  - Neudo Ribeiro Campos (from 1 January)
- Santa Catarina:
  - Antônio Carlos Konder Reis (until 1 January)
  - Paulo Afonso Vieira (from 1 January)
- São Paulo:
  - Luís Antônio Fleury Filho (until 1 January)
  - Mário Covas (from 1 January)
- Sergipe:
  - João Alves Filho (until 1 January)
  - Albano Franco (from 1 January)
- Tocantins: José Wilson Siqueira Campos (from 1 January)

=== Vice governors ===
- Acre: Labib Murad (from 1 January)
- Alagoas:
  - Francisco Roberto Holanda de Melo (until 1 January)
  - Manuel Gomes de Barros (from 1 January)
- Amapá:
  - Ronaldo Pinheiro Borges (until 1 January)
  - Antônio Hildegardo Gomes de Alencar (from 1 January)
- Amazonas:
  - Francisco Garcia Rodrigues (until 1 January)
  - Alfredo Pereira do Nascimento (from 1 January)
- Bahia:
  - Rosalvo Barbosa Romeo (until 1 January)
  - César Borges (from 1 January)
- Ceará:
  - Lúcio Gonçalo de Alcântara (until 1 January)
  - Moroni Bing Torgan (from 1 January)
- Espírito Santo:
  - Adelson Antônio Salvador (until 1 January)
  - José Renato Casagrande (from 1 January)
- Goiás: Naphtali Alves de Souza (from 1 January)
- Maranhão: José Reinaldo Carneiro Tavares (from 1 January)
- Mato Grosso:
  - Osvaldo Roberto Sobrinho (until 1 January)
  - José Márcio Panoff de Lacerda (from 1 January)
- Mato Grosso do Sul:
  - Ary Rigo (until 1 January)
  - Braz Melo (from 1 January)
- Minas Gerais:
  - Arlindo Porto Neto (until 1 January)
  - Walfrido Silvino dos Mares Guia Neto (from 1 January)
- Pará: Hélio Mota Gueiros Júnior (from 1 January)
- Paraíba:
  - José Maranhão (until 16 September),
  - Vacant thereafter (from 16 September)
- Paraná: Emília de Sales Belinati
- Pernambuco:
  - Carlos Roberto Guerra Fontes (until 1 January)
  - Jorge José Gomes (from 1 January)
- Piauí: Osmar Antônio de Araújo
- Rio de Janeiro: Luiz Paulo Corrêa da Rocha (from 1 January)
- Rio Grande do Norte:
  - Vacant (until 1 January)
  - Fernando Freire (from 1 January)
- Rio Grande do Sul:
  - João Gilberto Lucas Coelho (until 1 January)
  - Vicente Joaquim Bogo (from 1 January)
- Rondônia:
  - Assis Canuto (until 1 January)
  - Aparício Carvalho de Moraes (from 1 January)
- Roraima:
  - Antônio Airton Oliveira Dias (until 1 January)
  - Airton Antonio Soligo (from 1 January)
- Santa Catarina: José Augusto Hülse (from 1 January)
- São Paulo:
  - Aloysio Nunes (until 1 January)
  - Geraldo Alckmin (from 1 January)
- Sergipe:
  - José Carlos Mesquita Teixeira (until 1 January)
  - José Carlos Machado (from 1 January)
- Tocantins:
  - Paulo Sidnei Antunes (until 1 January)
  - Raimundo Nonato Pires dos Santos (from 1 January)

== Events ==
- Unknown Date
  - Surya Brasil cosmetics company is founded.

=== January ===
- January 1: Fernando Henrique Cardoso is inaugurated as the 34th President of Brazil.

=== May ===
- May 19: Bertioga becomes an independent municipality. Prior to that, it was part of Santos.

=== August ===
- August 9: An armed conflict between the Landless Workers' Movement and military police leaves ten dead in Corumbiara, Rondônia.

=== October ===
- October 12: The bishop of the Universal Church, Sérgio von Helder, kicks a statue of Our Lady of Aparecida, the country's patron saint; during two programs on Rede Record.

=== December ===
- December 21: The founding of the city of Pintópolis.

== Births ==
=== January ===
- January 5: Whindersson Nunes, media personality

=== February ===
- February 8: Ghilherme Lobo, actor
- February 9: Otávio, Footballer

=== April ===
- April 3: William, footballer
- April 4: Walace, footballer

=== June ===
- June 9: Tay Melo, professional wrestler and judoka

=== July ===
- July 22: Marília Mendonça, singer (died 2021)

=== November ===
- November 20: Christian Lindell, tennis player

== Deaths ==
=== February ===
- February 4: Aloísio de Oliveira, record producer, singer, actor and composer. (b. 1914)

=== April ===
- April 27: Raphael Rabello, guitarist and composer (b. 1962)

=== September ===
- September 4: Paulo Gracindo, actor (b. 1911)

== See also ==
- 1995 in Brazilian football
- 1995 in Brazilian television
