= 2026 Roraima gubernatorial special election =

Gubernatorial election held in Brazil

- 19 June 2026
- Turnout: 70.35% (first round)
- Gubernatorial election
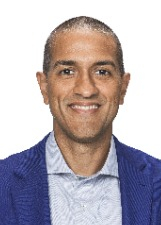

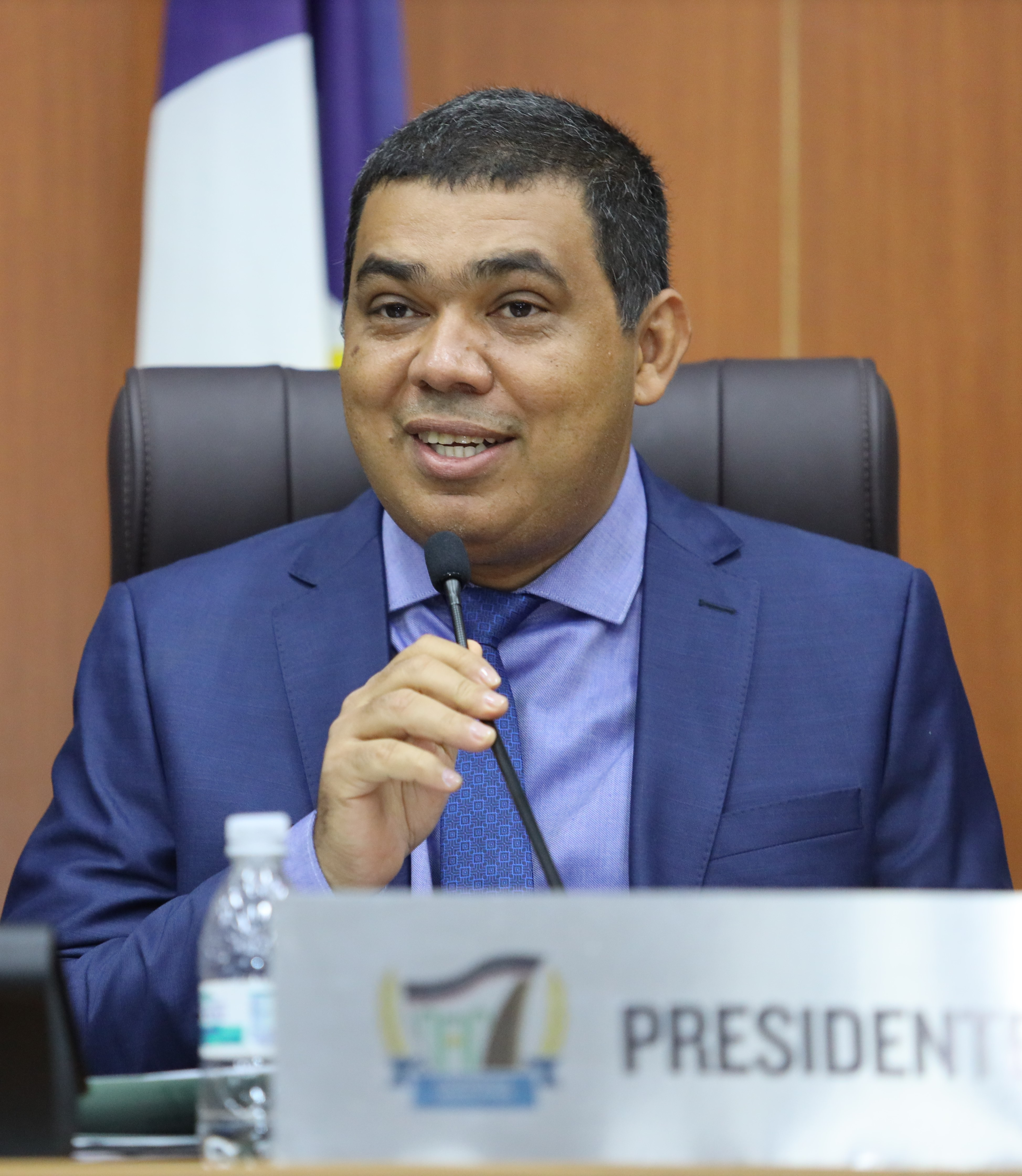
Candidate	Arthur Henrique	Soldado Sampaio
Party	PL	Republicanos
Alliance	Isolated Party	Roraima Moves Forward
Running mate	Subtenente Velton	Tayla Peres
Popular vote	160,004	93,897
Percentage	60.87%	35,72%
Governor before election
Soldado Sampaio
Republicanos
Elected Governor
Arthur Henrique (SJ)
PL

The 2026 Roraima gubernatorial special election (eleição suplementar para governador de Roraima em 2026) is a special election scheduled for 21 June 2026 to elect the governor and vice-governor of the Brazilian state of Roraima for a caretaker term ending on 5 January 2027. The election was called after the Superior Electoral Court (TSE) annulled the 2022 election of Antonio Denarium (Republicans) and his running mate Edilson Damião (União Brasil) for abuse of political and economic power.

Despite securing an absolute majority of the votes, Arthur Henrique (PL) was not declared elected because he ran sub judice due to a failure to meet the deadline for stepping down from his previous role to become eligible. Henrique won 60.87% of the valid votes—representing 160,004 voters—which exceeded the 50% threshold of the total vote; this result prevented the election of the runner-up, Soldado Sampaio, who could have been declared the winner had his opponent not secured an absolute majority. Consequently, the election outcome remains unresolved pending a ruling on Arthur's case.

== Background ==
On 30 April 2026, the TSE upheld earlier rulings by the Regional Electoral Court of Roraima (TRE-RR) that found Denarium and Damião guilty of abuse of political and economic power during the 2022 campaign, in particular through the electoral use of the social programs Cesta da Família and Morar Melhor. The court removed Damião from office, declared Denarium ineligible for eight years, and ordered a direct election to fill the vacancy.

Denarium had resigned on 27 March 2026 in order to run for the Federal Senate in the October 2026 general election, at which point Damião assumed the governorship. Following the TSE ruling, the president of the Legislative Assembly of Roraima, Soldado Sampaio (Republicans), took office as interim governor pending the supplementary election.

== Electoral schedule ==
The TRE-RR formalised the calendar through Resolution No. 584/2026, published on 2 May 2026. Key dates include:

- Party conventions: by 17 May 2026
- Candidate registration deadline: 20 May 2026, 19:00 BRT
- Start of electoral advertising: 21 May 2026
- Free radio and television broadcasts: from 3 June 2026
- Election day: 21 June 2026
- Possible second round: date to be set by the TSE

The campaign spending cap was set at R$3,557,761.23 for the first round and R$1,778,880.62 for any second round. The winning ticket will be inaugurated in July 2026 and serve until 5 January 2027, when the winner of the regular October 2026 general election takes office.

== Candidates ==
Despite the cassation, Edilson Damião announced a candidacy for both the supplementary election and the October general election, arguing that his political rights remained intact because the TSE found no personal participation by him in the offences attributed to Denarium.

Party	Candidate	Most relevant political office or occupation	Party	Running mate	Coalition	Electoral number	TV time per party/coalition	Refs.
Republicans	Soldado Sampaio	Acting Governor of Roraima (2026)	Republicans	Tayla Peres	Roraima Moves Forward: Republicans; PODE; PDT; MDB; PSD; Always Forward; PSDB; Citizenship; Act	10	4min and 37sec	
Workers' Party (PT)	Nelita Frank	Sociologist	Socialism and Liberty Party (PSOL)	Bartô Macuxi	Roraima of Hope: Brazil of Hope; Workers' Party (PT); Communist Party of Brazil (PCdoB); Green Party (PV); PSOL-REDE; Socialism and Liberty Party (PSOL); Sustainability Network (REDE)	13	2min and 41sec	

=== Impugnations ===
Arthur Henrique (PL) had his candidacy challenged by the TRE-RR on June 2 due to failure to meet the deadline for stepping down from his previous office to run for election. However, on the 17th, TSE Justice Antonio Carlos Ferreira allowed Arthur’s radio and television campaign to continue—and his name to remain on the ballot—pending a ruling on his case, though his votes must be counted as *sub judice*.

Party	Candidate	Most relevant political office or occupation	Party	Running mate	Coalition	Electoral number	TV time per party/coalition	Refs.
Liberal Party (PL)	Arthur Henrique	Mayor of Boa Vista (2024–2026)	Liberal Party (PL)	Subtenente Velton	—N/a	22	2min and 41sec	

=== Results ===
Candidate	Running mate	Party	Votes	%
Arthur Henrique	Subtenente Velton (PL)	Liberal Party	160,004	60.87
Soldado Sampaio	Tayla Peres (Republicans)	Republicans	93,897	35.72
Neilta Frank	Bartô Macuxi (PSOL)	Workers' Party	8,948	3.40
Total			262,849	100.00
Valid votes			262,849	97.15
Invalid votes			4,295	1.59
Blank votes			3,414	1.26
Total votes			270,558	100.00
Registered voters/turnout			384,582	70.35
Arthur Henrique's votes are *sub judice*.				

== See also ==
- 2026 Brazilian general election
