= 1996 in Brazil =

Events in the year 1996 in Brazil.

== Incumbents ==
=== Federal government ===
- President: Fernando Henrique Cardoso
- Vice President: Marco Maciel

=== Governors ===
- Acre: Orleir Messias Cameli
- Alagoas: Divaldo Suruagy
- Amapa: João Capiberibe
- Amazonas: Amazonino Mendes
- Bahia: Paulo Souto
- Ceará: Tasso Jereissati
- Espírito Santo: Vitor Buaiz
- Goiás: Maguito Vilela
- Maranhão: Roseana Sarney
- Mato Grosso: Dante de Oliveira
- Mato Grosso do Sul: Wilson Barbosa Martins
- Minas Gerais: Eduardo Brandão Azeredo
- Pará: Almir Gabriel
- Paraíba: José Maranhão
- Paraná: Jaime Lerner
- Pernambuco: Miguel Arraes
- Piauí: Mão Santa
- Rio de Janeiro: Marcello Alencar
- Rio Grande do Norte: Garibaldi Alves Filho
- Rio Grande do Sul: Antônio Britto
- Rondônia: Valdir Raupp de Mattos
- Roraima: Neudo Ribeiro Campos
- Santa Catarina: Paulo Afonso Vieira
- São Paulo: Mário Covas
- Sergipe: Albano Franco
- Tocantins: José Wilson Siqueira Campos

=== Vice governors ===
- Acre: Labib Murad
- Alagoas: Manuel Gomes de Barros
- Amapá: Antônio Hildegardo Gomes de Alencar
- Amazonas: Alfredo Pereira do Nascimento
- Bahia: César Borges
- Ceará: Moroni Bing Torgan
- Espírito Santo: José Renato Casagrande
- Goiás: Naphtali Alves de Souza
- Maranhão: José Reinaldo Carneiro Tavares
- Mato Grosso: José Márcio Panoff de Lacerda
- Mato Grosso do Sul:
  - Braz Melo (until 3 May)
  - Vacant (starting 3 May)
- Minas Gerais: Walfrido Silvino dos Mares Guia Neto
- Pará: Hélio Mota Gueiros Júnior
- Paraíba: vacant
- Paraná: Emília de Sales Belinati
- Pernambuco: Jorge José Gomes
- Piauí: Osmar Antônio de Araújo
- Rio de Janeiro: Luiz Paulo Correa da Rocha
- Rio Grande do Norte: Fernando Freire
- Rio Grande do Sul: Vicente Joaquim Bogo
- Rondônia: Aparício Carvalho de Moraes
- Roraima: Airton Antonio Soligo
- Santa Catarina: José Augusto Hülse
- São Paulo: Geraldo Alckmin
- Sergipe: José Carlos Machado
- Tocantins: Raimundo Nonato Pires dos Santos

== Events ==
=== January ===
- 8 January: President Fernando Henrique Cardoso issues Decree 1775, which creates a framework for the clear demarcation of indigenous territories. However, as part of the process, this opens indigenous territories to counterclaims by adjacent landowners.
- 20 January: Varginha UFO incident in Minas Gerais.

=== March ===
- 2 March: A Learjet 25 carrying the Brazilian satirical rock band Mamonas Assassinas attempts a go-around at São Paulo–Guarulhos International Airport in São Paulo, Brazil, but crashes in the Serra da Cantareira mountain range. All nine people on board are killed, including all five members of the band.

=== April ===
- 17 April: Nineteen landless farmers who were squatting at a private ranch are shot dead by military police.
- 20 April: Launch of the Fiat Palio, a car model that would become the country's sales leader.

=== June ===
- 23 June: Paulo César Farias and his girlfriend are found dead in their house on Guaxuma beach, in Maceió, Alagoas.

=== October ===
- 31 October: A fokker 100 jet, departing for Rio de Janeiro, crashes into houses in the Jabaquara neighborhood, south of São Paulo, leaving 99 dead.

=== November ===
- 25 November: Darci Alves Pereira, one of the murderers of rubber tapper leader Chico Mendes, is recaptured by the Federal Police in Guaíra, Paraná.

== Births ==
=== January ===
- January 11: Baco Exu do Blues, rapper
- January 19: Rodrigo Becão, footballer
- January 28: Kim Kataguiri, politician and co-founder of the Free Brazil Movement.

=== February ===
- February 8: Isadora Williams, figure skater

=== March ===
- March 22
  - Everton Soares, professional footballer
  - Yasmin Hachem, politician

=== May ===
- May 6: Valesca Machado, mixed martial artist

=== July ===
- July 9: Rafael Miguel, actor (d. 2019)

=== August ===
- August 12: Arthur Melo, professional footballer
- August 30: Gabriel Barbosa, professional footballer

=== December ===
- December 14: Raphinha, professional footballer

== Deaths ==
=== January ===
- 18 January: Alberto Ruschel, actor (b. 1918)

=== March ===
- 2 March: The whole band Mamonas Assassinas (form. 1989 as Utopia)

=== June ===
- 23 June: Paulo Cesar Farias, politician (b. 1945)

=== September ===
- September 12: Ernesto Geisel, 29th President of Brazil (b. 1907)

=== October ===
- October 11: Renato Russo, singer (b. 1960)

=== December ===
- December 16: Dondinho, professional footballer and father of Pelé (b. 1917)

== See also ==
- 1996 in Brazilian football
- 1996 in Brazilian television
