= 1997 in Brazil =

Events in the year 1997 in Brazil.

== Incumbents ==
=== Federal government ===
- President: Fernando Henrique Cardoso
- Vice President: Marco Maciel

=== Governors ===
- Acre: Orleir Messias Cameli
- Alagoas:
  - Divaldo Suruagy (till 17 July)
  - Manoel Gomes de Barros (Mano) (from 17 July)
- Amapa: João Capiberibe
- Amazonas: Amazonino Mendes
- Bahia: Paulo Souto
- Ceará: Tasso Jereissati
- Espírito Santo: Vitor Buaiz
- Goiás: Maguito Vilela
- Maranhão: Roseana Sarney
- Mato Grosso: Dante de Oliveira
- Mato Grosso do Sul: Wilson Barbosa Martins
- Minas Gerais: Eduardo Brandão Azeredo
- Pará: Almir Gabriel
- Paraíba: José Maranhão
- Paraná: Jaime Lerner
- Pernambuco: Miguel Arraes
- Piauí: Mão Santa
- Rio de Janeiro: Marcello Alencar
- Rio Grande do Norte: Garibaldi Alves Filho
- Rio Grande do Sul: Antônio Britto
- Rondônia: Valdir Raupp de Mattos
- Roraima: Neudo Ribeiro Campos
- Santa Catarina: Paulo Afonso Vieira
- São Paulo: Mário Covas
- Sergipe: Albano Franco
- Tocantins: José Wilson Siqueira Campos

=== Vice governors ===
- Acre: Labib Murad
- Alagoas:
  - Manuel Gomes de Barros (until 17 July)
  - Vacant (starting 17 July)
- Amapá: Antônio Hildegardo Gomes de Alencar
- Amazonas:
  - Alfredo Pereira do Nascimento (until 17 July)
  - Vacant (starting 17 July)
- Bahia: César Borges
- Ceará: Moroni Bing Torgan
- Espírito Santo: José Renato Casagrande
- Goiás: Naphtali Alves de Souza
- Maranhão: José Reinaldo Carneiro Tavares
- Mato Grosso: José Márcio Panoff de Lacerda
- Mato Grosso do Sul: Vacant
- Minas Gerais: Walfrido Silvino dos Mares Guia Neto
- Pará: Hélio Mota Gueiros Júnior
- Paraíba: Vacant
- Paraná: Emília de Sales Belinati
- Pernambuco: Jorge José Gomes
- Piauí: Osmar Antônio de Araújo
- Rio de Janeiro: Luiz Paulo Correa da Rocha
- Rio Grande do Norte: Fernando Freire
- Rio Grande do Sul: Vicente Joaquim Bogo
- Rondônia: Aparício Carvalho de Moraes
- Roraima: Airton Antonio Soligo
- Santa Catarina: José Augusto Hülse
- São Paulo: Geraldo Alckmin
- Sergipe: José Carlos Machado
- Tocantins: Raimundo Nonato Pires dos Santos

== Events ==
=== January ===
- January 25: Guilherme de Pádua is sentenced to 19 years in prison for the 1992 murder of actress Daniella Perez.

=== March ===
- March 31: A Jornal Nacional report on TV Globo, shows images of military police officers from São Paulo caught attacking residents of Favela Naval, in Diadema, during a blitz they carried out there. Mario José Josino died from a gunshot to the back of the head.

=== April ===
- April 5: The program Planeta Xuxa premiers on TV Globo.
- April 20: Galdino Jesus dos Santos, a Pataxó native, is murdered by five students from Brasília after celebrating Indigenous Peoples Day.

=== May ===
- May 6: The company Vale do Rio Doce is privatized and sold to Consórcio Brasil, led by CSN, for R$3.3 billion.

=== June ===
- June 29: Brazil defeats Bolivia 3-1, to win their fifth Copa America trophy.

=== October ===
- October 2: Pope John Paul II visits Rio de Janeiro to participate in the 2nd World Meeting with Families.

=== December ===
- December 21: Brazil defeats Australia 6-0 to win the 1997 FIFA Confederations Cup.

== Births ==
=== January ===
- January 20: Rayane Soares da Silva, Paralympic athlete

=== February ===
- February 26: Malcom, professional footballer

=== March ===
- March 3: David Neres, professional footballer
- March 10: Gabi Nunes, professional footballer
- March 23: Thiago Maia, professional footballer

=== April ===
- April 3: Gabriel Jesus, professional footballer

=== May ===
- May 10: Richarlison, professional footballer

=== August ===
- August 9: Luisa Stefani, professional tennis player
- August 27: Lucas Paquetá, professional footballer

=== November ===
- November 16: Bruno Guimarães, professional footballer

=== December ===
- December 21: Pedro Sampaio, music and producer

== Deaths ==
=== February ===
- February 2: Chico Science, singer and composer (b. 1966)
- February 17: Darcy Ribeiro, anthropologist and politician (b. 1922)

=== April ===
- April 11: Castor de Andrade, mobster (b. 1926)

=== May ===
- May 2: Paulo Freire, philosopher (b. 1921)

=== August ===
- August 9: Herbert de Souza, activist and sociologist (b. 1935)

== See also ==
- 1997 in Brazilian football
- 1997 in Brazilian television
