= Ailton Krenak =

Writer, journalist, philosopher, and Indigenous rights activist from Brazil

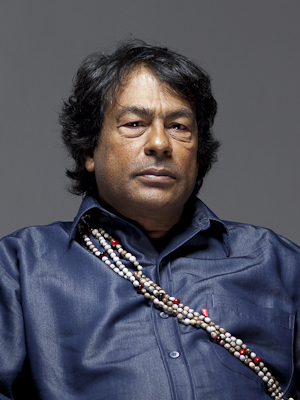
- Born: 29 September 1953 (age 73); Itabirinha, Minas Gerais, Brazil
- Education: BA in Philosophy (Universidade Federal de Juiz de Fora)
- Occupations: Writer, philosopher, journalist, environmentalist and Indigenous activist
- Title: Doctor (honorary)
- Honours: Order of Cultural Merit (2008)

Ailton Krenak (born 29 September 1953) is an Indigenous writer, philosopher, journalist, environmentalist, and activist of the Krenak people.

He became widely known after his protest at the Brazilian Constituent Assembly on 4 September 1987, when he painted his face with black jenipapo dye while delivering a speech against the violation of Indigenous peoples rights. He participated in the drafting of the Brazilian Constitution of 1988 (known as the "Citizen Constitution") as a representative of Indigenous peoples.

Krenak is the author of Ideas to Postpone the End of the World (2020), Life is not useful (2023), and Ancestral Future (2024), among other books, essays and interviews. His ideas on predatory human activity against the planet, non-anthropocentric humanity, the institution of dreaming, and the relevance of orality as a way to reconnect with community and the planet, developed in books such as Life is Not Useful, have been very influential to environmentalism and modern thought in general, an influence that served as ground for his induction as the first indigenous member of the Brazilian Academy of Letters in 2024.

== Biography ==
Ailton Alves Lacerda Krenak was born on 29 September 1953, in Itabirinha de Mantena, Minas Gerais. He was raised in the Doce River valley region of Brazil until he was 17 years-old, a territory of the Krenak people which has been severely impacted by legal and illegal activities of mining, logging and construction companies.

He has founded and participated in several Indigenous rights organisations, such as the União dos Povos Indígenas (Union of Indigenous Peoples), the Aliança dos Povos da Floresta (Alliance of Forest-dwelling Peoples), the Núcleo de Cultura Indígena (Nucleus of Indigenous Culture), among others. In 2000, he appeared on TV Escola's documentary film Índios no Brasil (Indigenous Peoples in Brazil). From 2003 to 2010, Krenak was special aide for Indigenous affairs to the governor of Minas Gerais. In 2016, he was awarded an honorary doctorate by the Federal University of Juiz de Fora, where he teaches culture, history and traditional knowledge of indigenous peoples.

Krenak was the recipient of the 2022 Prince Claus Fund Impact Awards, along with María Medrano, Argentina; Luis Manuel Otero Alcántara, Cuba; May al-Ibrashy, Egypt; Hassan Darsi, Morocco and Alain Gomis, Senegal.

On 4 October 2023, he was elected to the Brazilian Academy of Letters, being the first Indigenous Brazilian to join the institution.

== Books ==
Krenak is considered one of the foremost thinkers in Brazilian contemporaneity. His books include Ideas to Postpone the End of the World (2020), Life is not useful (2023), and Ancestral Future (2024), among other works, essays and interviews.

=== Ideas to Postpone the End of the World ===
Ideas to Postpone the End of the World (2020) is an adaptation of lectures and interviews given by Ailton Krenak between 2017 and 2020.

==== Publishing and translations ====
The book was originally published in 2019 by Brazilian publishing house Companhia das Letras under the title Ideias para adiar o fim do mundo. Written in Brazilian Portuguese, the first edition included a revised version of two lectures and one interview that took place in Lisbon between 2017 and 2019. It comprised three texts: "Ideias para adiar o fim do mundo" ["Ideas to postpone the end of the world"], "Do sonho e da terra" ["Of dreams and the earth"], and "A humanidade que pensamos ser" ["The humanity we think we are"].

The English version, published in Canada and the United States in 2020 by House of Anansi Press Inc, includes the three texts "Ideas to Postpone the End of the World", "Of Dreams and the Earth", "The Humanity We Think We Are", as well as an additional, introductory text, titled "Tomorrow Is Not For Sale" ["O amanhã não está à venda"], which appeared in Krenak's book O amanhã não está à venda (2020).

Ideas to Postpone the End of the World has also been translated and published in Italian, French, Spanish,German, Swedish, Dutch, Czech, and Japanese.

==== Background and overview ====
The book critiques the nature-culture binary characteristic of Western thought, which posits a hierarchichal asymmetry between humans and non-humans. Within this binary, humanity is separate and distanced from nature's living and non-living organisms such as rivers, forests, and landscapes, with humans standing at the top of the hierarchy, and non-humans standing at the bottom.

According to Krenak, the title of the book constitutes a provocation which occurred to him when he received a call, while doing gardening activities, from the University of Brasília with an invitation to present a lecture on sustainable development. Having accepted the invitation, he was asked to provide the lecture's title, to which he spontaneously replied: "Ideas to Postpone the End of the World". To his surprise, the organizers kept it as the official title. About three months later, he received a follow-up call inquiring whether he had arranged his travel to Brasília, as his lecture on postponing the end of the world was scheduled for the following day.

Given the rainy weather at the time of the event, he assumed it would be sparsely attended. Upon arriving at the venue, however, Krenak encountered a full auditorium, consisting not only of the Master's students at the Center of Sustainable Development who were supposed to be his main attendees, but also of people from various parts of the university community, drawn by the possibility of hearing his strategies to avert global catastrophe. This introduction set the stage for his critical assessment of the myth of sustainability, an idea advanced by corporations to justify the assault on and disruption of Indigenous peoples' lands and conceptions of nature.

The book argues that there is a complete incompatibility between corporate practices and sustainable actions, with the latter being appropriated by the former for their marketing value. Currently, as Krenak contends, not even Indigenous communities are capable of being sustainable any longer, because the alienation humans have suffered from Earth as a living organism has made it impossible for any community to survive "in a way that is fully integrated with the land." Paraphrasing Uruguayan ex-President José Mujica, Krenak notes that the modern dissociation between humans and ecology has transformed people into consumers, rather than citizens, leading to the establishment of a "zombie humanity" devoid of joy, pleasure and fruition in life.

As part of a larger process initiated with European colonialism, this exploitative logic ends up suppressing and denying the diversity and plurality of life, existence, and ways of being in the world, in a manner that is deeply antagonistic to Indigenous cosmovisions, which see humans and non-humans as mutually constitutive.

==== Introduction: "Tomorrow Is Not For Sale" ====
In the introduction to Ideas to Postpone the End of the World, Krenak challenges the prevailing notions of progress and development that underpin modern civilization. Titled "Tomorrow Is Not for Sale", the text critiques the unsustainable exploitation of natural resources and the disconnection of humanity from the natural world, presenting a broader critique of anthropocentrism. Krenak underscores the urgency of rethinking our relationship with the planet, emphasizing Indigenous perspectives that prioritize harmony with nature over profit-driven ideologies.

He argues that the dominant worldview treats nature as a commodity, leading to ecological destruction and societal alienation. Krenak calls for a collective reimagining of futures that honor the interconnectedness of all living beings, instead of perpetuating harmful cycles of consumption and environmental degradation.

==== "Ideas to Postpone the End of the World" ====
In the first chapter of the eponymous book, Krenak presents a philosophical and poetic critique of modern humanity's detachment from the environment and its role in driving ecological collapse. Drawing on his experiences as an Indigenous leader and on the worldviews of the Krenak people, he highlights how the pursuit of material progress has eroded the spiritual and cultural connections between humans and nature.

To "postpone the end of the world", Krenak writes, society must embrace alternative ways of living that respect the earth's limits and that celebrate its diversity. This includes learning from Indigenous cosmologies, which view humans as part of an interconnected web of life (and not as the masters of the planet). He challenges the anthropocentric assumption that humanity can endlessly exploit the planet without consequences, calling for a radical shift toward sustainability and coexistence through the imagination of futures grounded in balance, community, and reverence for the natural world.

==== "Of Dreams and the Earth" ====
The second chapter of the book explores the relationship between human imagination, dreams, and the natural world. The text presents a reflection on how modern society's fixation on productivity and consumerism has diminished humanity's ability to dream collectively and maintain a meaningful connection with the Earth. For Krenak, dreams are not merely personal fantasies, but vital sources of knowledge and guidance that can inspire ways of living in harmony with the environment.

Drawing on Indigenous knowledge, he emphasizes that the earth is a living entity deeply intertwined with human existence. Krenak argues that neglecting this bond means severing an essential part of our humanity, and that revitalizing our capacity to dream is integral to resisting environmental destruction and envisioning alternative futures. The chapter posits how, for Krenak, dreaming consists in a powerful a tool for ecological and cultural renewal.

==== "The Humanity We Think We Are" ====
In the final chapter of the book, Krenak critiques the self-image humanity has constructed of itself, and the consequences this image has generated for the planet. He questions the assumption that humans are superior to other forms of life, arguing that this belief has fostered a destructive anthropocentrism. By placing themselves at the center of the world, humans have created systems of domination over nature and other species, leading to ecological crises and alienation from the spiritual and material worlds.

Krenak argues for the need to reconsider what it means to be human, in a way that recognizes interdependence and the shared vulnerability of all life on earth. The chapter proposes a vision of humanity that is humble, interconnected, and aligned with the rhythms of nature, calling for a more inclusive and sustainable understanding of existence. Ultimately, Krenak argues for a rethinking of the notion of humanity that is not based on "a single type of existence", but rather recognizes "nature as an immense multitude of forms, each and every piece of ourselves included, for we, too, are part of the whole: 70 percent water, and a host of other minerals".

== Philosophy ==
According to Krenak, human beings have dissociated themselves from the earth, which is being "devoured" by corporations that embody a European concept of humanity. This humanity is immured in artificial spaces and "excludes a variety of sub-humanities" which tend to latch onto the earth. He believes that the question whether there is a single humanity should remain open; however, Krenak does not feel like he is a member of this "select club". He believes COVID-19 discriminates against humans, due to the way human societies work. "It does not kill birds, bears, or any other beings, just humans", he says. That would be a consequence of how we came to think that the earth is a 'thing' and that we are distinct from it. "The type of zombie humanity we are invited to be a part of does not tolerate this much pleasure [of small constellations of people who dance, sing and make it rain], so much fruition of life. So, they preach the end of the world in the hopes of making us let go of our dreams." 'It is an absurd rationalisation of thought.'

He pleaded for the government of Jair Bolsonaro to be internationally condemned for failing to cut back on mining in Indigenous territories in the Amazon as well as in other places in which 'the ecology plays a regulating role of planetary climate.'

As to permanent human agglomerations, Krenak states: "The idea that we can think about life based on cities has been called into question. I do not venture to say we will abandon cities. But I recognise an opportunity to re-evaluate our dependency on an old model of settlement...what we see is a host of neglected human beings, without ever being able to collect on that promise [of urban spaces that cater to a person's every need]" And, as regards the challenges posed by COVID-19: "The big investors, the billionaires, they're not the agents of change [rather, the new generations are]...whoever has sensibility doesn't have to be in a position of power to bring about change." He defines spirituality as the "interdependence between all things living".

== Life is Not Useful ==
In Life is Not Useful, Krenak proposes that the anthropocentrism characteristic of Western thought has led to an artificial and erroneous separation between humanity and nature (or the nature/culture divide, as Nogueira, Pinto and Moreira point out). Human beings live under the illusion of total dominion over nature. For Krenak, the COVID-19 pandemic is positive proof of the error of these ideas: "We humans are not all-powerful -the Earth declares it". Against this anthropocentric perspective, Krenak postulates a broader notion of humanity that encompasses not only people, but also non-human entities such as trees, rivers, rocks, and animals. According to Krenak, there is a relationship of organic continuity between nature and human beings. Both humanity and non-human organic entities are an extension of the planet and in this sense are kin. When Krenak asserts that Earth is the mother of all organic life, he stresses how his words are not poetry but factual.

On the other hand, the erroneous idea that human beings are the masters of nature is, for Krenak, at the core of the culture of predation and consumerism that characterizes modernity. People are posited as "the plague that has come to devour the world". Capitalism, through the indiscriminate devastation of the planet, has led to an exorbitant accumulation of wealth by a minority that considers nature as an inexhaustible source of resources that will never run out and whose predatory action will not end until the planet becomes uninhabitable. Krenak observes that there is a consumerist obsession in modern society that responds to the capitalist logic of mass production. The pace of production and consumption is unsustainable and will inevitably end up devastating the planet. A predatory logic leads people to believe that humanity can colonize other planets when Earth's resources are exhausted, instead of changing their habits to preserve Earth.

In this context, Krenak defends what he calls the institution of dreaming. Dreaming involves the reestablishment of crucial connections -to possible and radically altered futures, to community and ancestors, to the planet- for the sustenance of life on Earth. First, dreaming allows us to imagine alternative logics and scenarios to those imposed by capitalism. Dreaming, Krenak writes, also reconnects the individual to the collective, in the sense that dreams can be narrated to those people who are closest to us. Thirdly, dreams can link different temporalities: they can connect the dreamer with their ancestors, or, as in the case of the shaman who confided in Krenak a vision of the devastation of the planet during his youth, they can be premonitory and announce the future. Finally, dreaming can lead to a reestablishment of the bond with the planet, in a dynamic that Krenak calls "the cosmic sense of life". According to Natalia Brizuela, dreaming is an inherent part of the cosmic sense of life and through it a broader sense of humanity can be imagined. Furthermore, as Tamara de Oliveira Rodriguez points out, for Krenak dreaming allows the possibility of a shared future where the tradition and the memory of ancestors can live on despite the hurdles and threats of modern life.

Orality is crucial to both the institution of dreaming and to Krenak's philosophy in general. Life is Not Useful, as well as others of his publications, are the result of conversations, public talks, debates, and other conversational encounters that were later transcribed and brought to print. Orality is central to Krenak because it is dialogic in nature and thus involves listening. According to Brizuela, dialogue, as an act of sharing, listening, and exchanging knowledge and affect, are crucial to Krenak's thought. Listening can also involve ancestors and connect with ancestral memory, and in this sense, as Ubiritane de Morais Rodrigues points out, it is part of a broader action of resistance in the struggle for the continuation of life on earth. Listening, moreover, pertains to other members of the human community, but also to those entities that are traditionally considered non-human. Krenak states that the climate crisis can be attested only by listening to the rivers, mountains and forests and that he "could hear the rivers speaking, sometimes angry, sometimes outraged".

By defending that life is not useful, Krenak denounces a utilitarian life whose sole purpose is money and consumerism. According to this author, life serves no such purpose. On the contrary, life is an all-encompassing vital experience similar to dancing. Krenak observes that capitalism reproduces itself by spreading its ideology through education. An educational system that molds young minds into social actors who contribute to the depredation of the planet is for Krenak a "factory of insanity" His critique of education and his ideas on utilitarianism, a broader conception of humanity, and the need to reconnect to ancestor memory and the planet have been read as an anti-colonial gesture.

Academic offices
Preceded by José Murilo de Carvalho	7th academic of the 5th chair of the Brazilian Academy of Letters; 2023–present	Incumbent
