= 2014 Roraima gubernatorial election =

- October 5, 2014
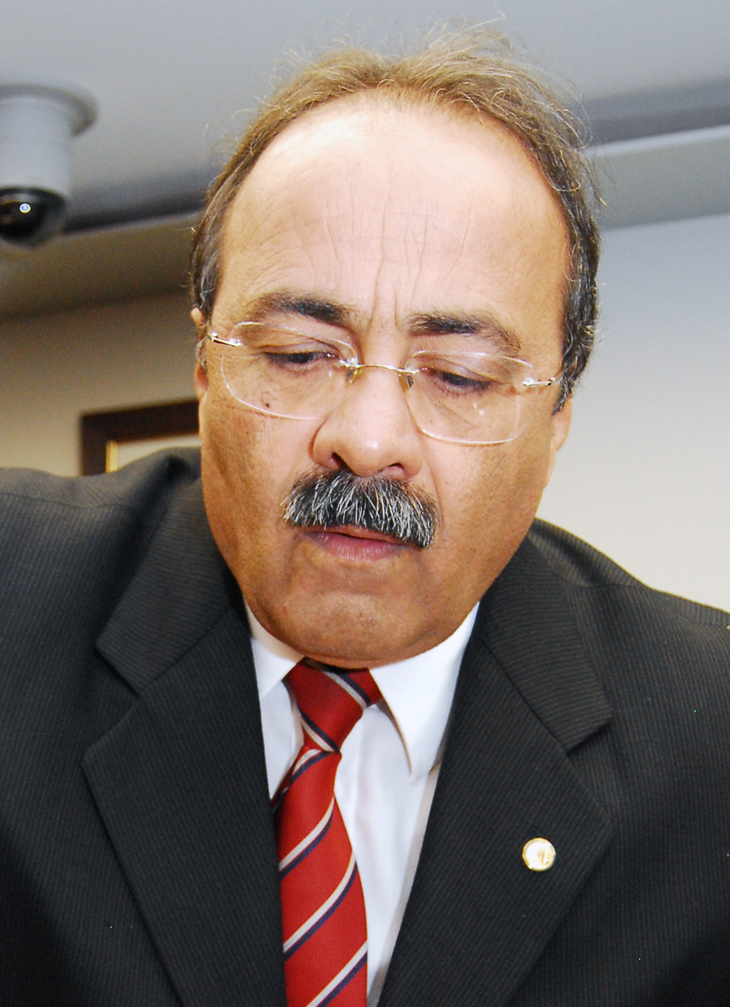

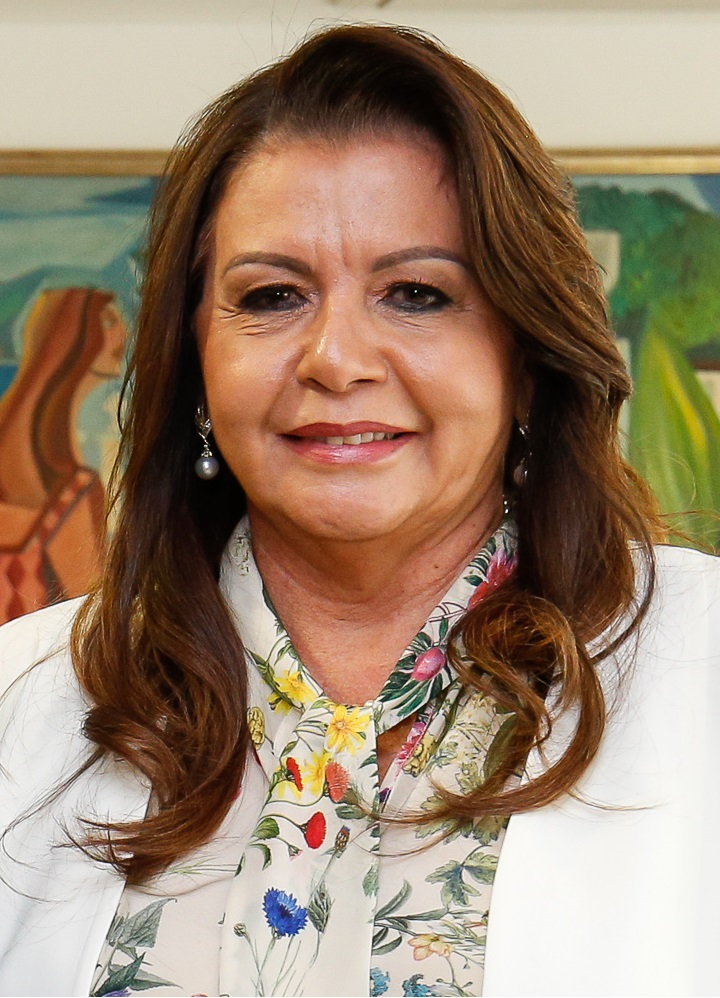

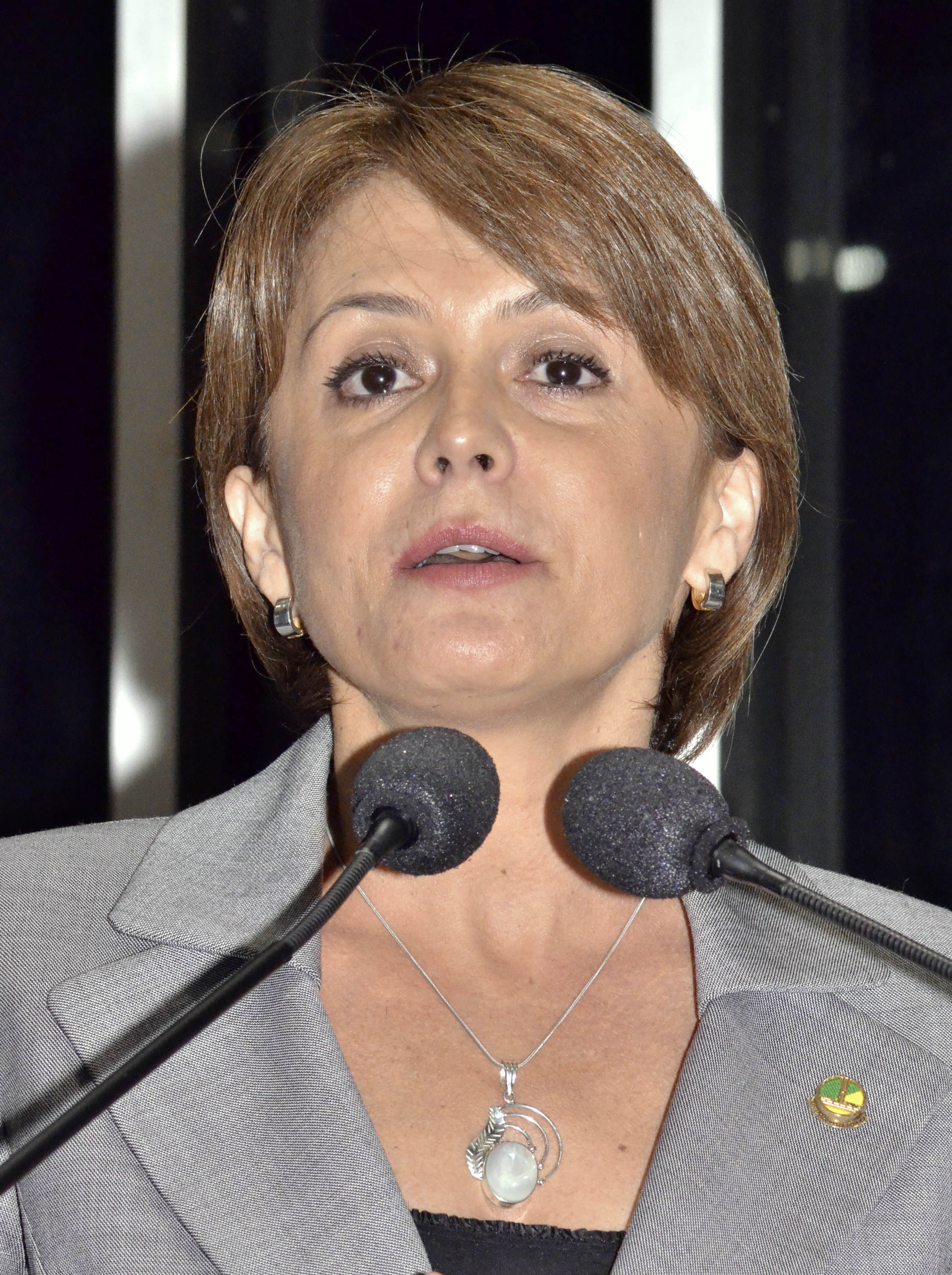
| Nominee | Chico Rodrigues | Suely Campos | Ângela Portela |
| Party | PSB | PP | PT |
| Running mate | Rodrigo Jucá | Paulo Quartiero | Alexandre Henklain |
Governor before election
Chico Rodrigues
PSB
Elected Governor
Suely Campos
PP

The Roraima gubernatorial election was held on 5 October 2014 to elect the next governor of the state of Roraima, Brazil. Governor Chico Rodrigues ran for his first full term after assuming the Governorship in April 2014.
