= Tayla Peres =

Brazilian politician (born 1991)

Member of the Legislative Assembly of Roraima
- Incumbent
- Assumed office 1 January 2019

Personal details
- Born: 13 February 1991 (age 35)
- Party: Republicans (since 2026)

Tayla Ribeiro Peres da Silva (born 13 February 1991) is a Brazilian politician serving as a member of the Legislative Assembly of Roraima since 2019. From 2017 to 2018, she was a municipal councillor of Boa Vista. In the 2026 gubernatorial special election, she was a candidate for vice governor of Roraima.
