= Lucas Souza =

Lucas Souza may refer to:

- Lucas Souza (footballer, born 1990), full name Lucas Vieira de Souza, Brazilian football midfielder
- Lucas Souza (footballer, born 1998), full name Lucas do Carmo Souza, Brazilian football central defender
- Lucas Souza (politician) (born 1997), Brazilian politician
