= Venezuelan Brazilians =

Venezuelan Brazilians Venezuelano-brasileiros Venezolano brasileños
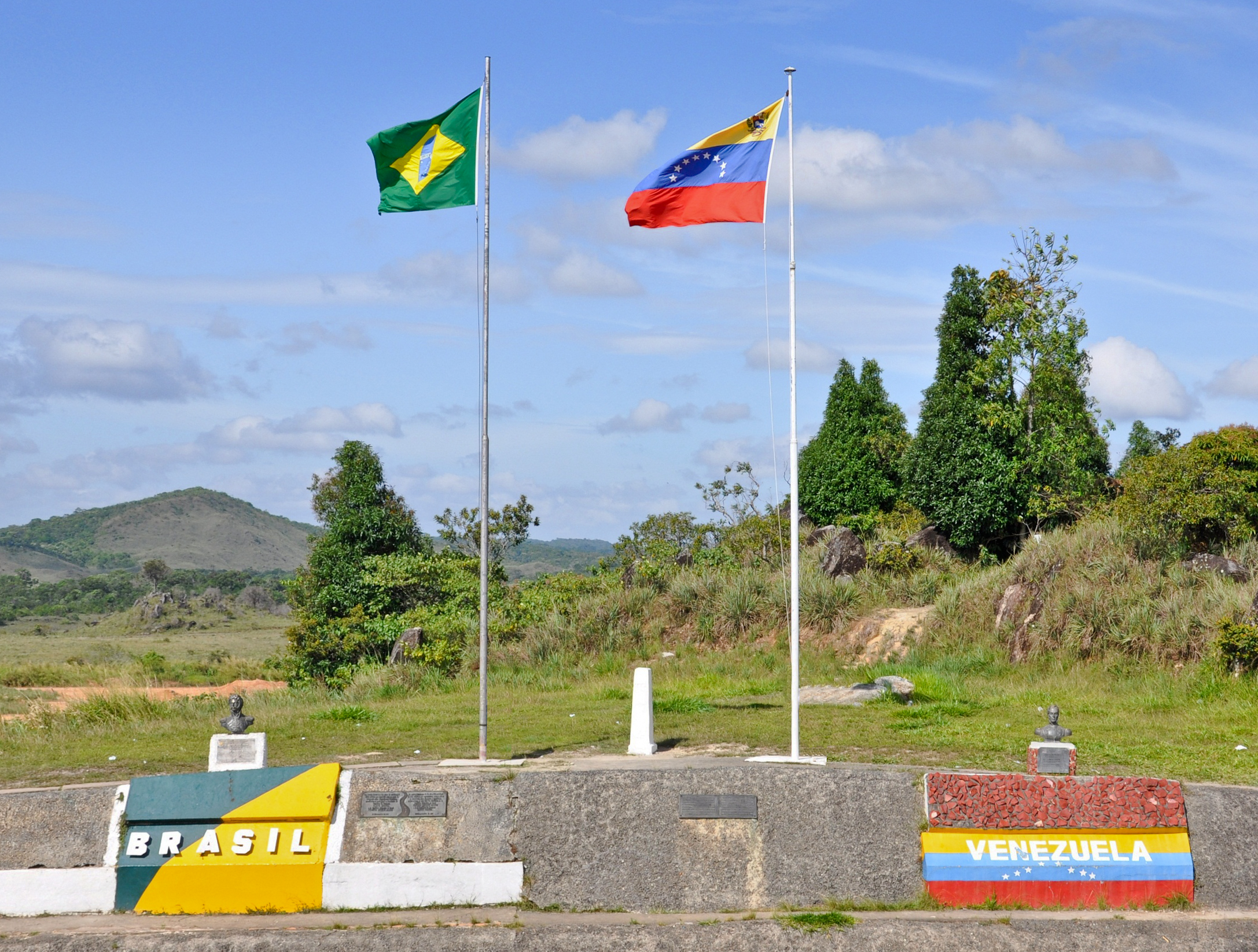
- Pacaraima in the northern state of Roraima has served as a major point of entry for Venezuelan refugees coming into Brazil.
- (Brazil) (Venezuela)

Total population
- 626,885

Regions with significant populations
- Brazil: Mainly Northern Region; Southeastern; Central-West

Languages
- Spanish · Portuguese; Minority: Warao

Religion
- Mostly Roman Catholicism and Folk religions.

Related ethnic groups
- Venezuelans other Brazilian, Hispanic and Hispanophone people

Venezuelan Brazilians are individuals of full, partial, or predominantly Venezuelan ancestry, or a Venezuelan-born person residing in Brazil. Until the early 2010s, the immigration of this group was little expressive compared to the immigration of other South American peoples such as Argentines, Bolivians or Paraguayans. However, the crisis in Venezuela and the subsequent refugee crisis has led to Brazil becoming home to a large number of Venezuelan refugees, most of whom enter the border through the northern state of Roraima. By the beginning of the 2020, more than 200,000 Venezuelans have migrated to the country looking for refuge.

Mass migration from Venezuela has proven challenging for authorities in Roraima, with informal estimates from 2019 suggesting that Venezuelan refugees constitute a fifth of the state's total population.

Testimony of a Venezuelan immigrant about her first days in São Paulo, March 2017 (in Spanish, with English subtitles)

== Anti-migrant sentiment ==
Backlash against Venezuelan migrants in Roraima has led to numerous violent attacks on refugees by Brazilians, with groups such as the Patriotas de Roraima ("Patriots of Roraima") forming to oppose further migration.

The Venezuelan refugee crisis has had dramatic effects on the politics of Roraima, with the issue of accommodating refugees becoming a top issue in state politics. In 2018, right-wing businessman Antonio Denarium, an ally of Jair Bolsonaro, successfully ran for Governor of Roraima. In office, he has advocated for the federal government to close the border with Venezuela. During the 2020 Brazilian municipal elections, some right-wing candidates in the state capital city of Boa Vista employed anti-Venezuelan sentiment.

== Migration of Warao people ==
A notable number of Venezuelans who emigrate to Brazil are of the Warao ethnicity. Most of them, when migrating, settle in the state of Roraima, which borders Venezuela.

=== Espírito Santo ===
On August 16, 2022, about 25 Warao from Teixeira de Freitas, Bahia, (Note: Before arriving in Vitória, expected to be their last stop, the group crossed the Venezuelan border in the city of Pacaraima, Roraima, passing through cities such as Boa Vista, Manaus, Belém and Jequié, the latter already in Bahia.) were dropped off by a city bus in an area close to the Vitória bus station, Espírito Santo, during the night, thus generating a debate about whose care responsibility and whether it would be legal to "transfer the problem to another city". On the same day, they were sent to a temporary shelter at Centro Pop, with another 21 expected to arrive.

Even with the secretary of Welfare of Teixeira de Freitas, Marcelo Teixeira, denying the accusations of negligence, saying that "dignity for these people was not lacking" and that the initiative to move to the capital was from the indigenous themselves, he was criticized in his social networks. Vitoria claimed that it had not been previously informed of the arrival of the Venezuelans, so that "if it had known, it would have prepared a more dignified reception". The secretary, in turn, said that he did not do it because he understood that it should be done to FUNAI. Neither the Secretariat of Justice, Human Rights and Social Development of Bahia nor the state government itself were communicated.

== See also ==
- Brazil–Venezuela relations
- Venezuelan refugee crisis
- Venezuelan protests (2014–present)
- Anti-Venezuelan sentiment
- Immigration from other South American countries to Brazil
- List of diasporas
