= Arthur Henrique (politician) =

Brazilian politician (born 1981)

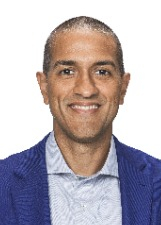
- Henrique in 2024

Governor-elect of Roraima
- Assuming office 6 January 2027
- Vice Governor: Haroldo Cathedral (elect)
- Succeeding: Francisco Sampaio

Mayor of Boa Vista
- In office 1 January 2021 – 2 April 2026
- Vice Mayor: Cássio Gomes (2021–2024); Marcelo Zeitoune (2024–2026)
- Preceded by: Teresa Surita
- Succeeded by: Marcelo Zeitoune

Vice Mayor of Boa Vista
- In office 1 January 2017 – 1 January 2021
- Mayor: Teresa Surita
- Preceded by: Marcelo Moreira
- Succeeded by: Cássio Gomes

Personal details
- Born: Arthur Henrique Brandão Machado; 19 August 1981 (age 45) Boa Vista, Roraima, Brazil
- Party: PL (since 2025)
- Other political affiliations: PSD (2016–2019); MDB (2019–2025)

Arthur Henrique Brandão Machado (born 19 August 1981) is a Brazilian politician who was elected governor of Roraima in 2026. From 2021 to 2026, he served as mayor of Boa Vista.

Political offices
Preceded by Marcelo Moreira	Vice Mayor of Boa Vista; 2017–2021	Succeeded by Cássio Gomes
Preceded by Teresa Surita	Mayor of Boa Vista; 2021–2026	Succeeded by Marcelo Zeitoune
Preceded by Francisco Sampaio	Governor of Roraima; Taking office 2027	Elect
