= May al-Ibrashy =

Egyptian architectural engineer

- Born: 1970 (age 55–56)
- Occupation: Architectural Engineer
- Board member of: Founder & Chair of Megawra-Built Environment Collective

May al-Ibrashy is an Egyptian architectural engineer, the co-founder and principal of Megawra and chair of Megawra-Built environment collective (BEC). Al-Ibrashy works on community engagement projects through heritage conservation, rehabilitation, preservation, and re-signification centered in Cairo's marginalized communities.

== Education ==
Al-Ibrashy was born in Cairo in 1970. She obtained a degree in architectural engineering from Ain Shams University in Cairo. She continued her education to complete a master's in the history of Islamic Art, architecture, and archaeology from the University of London, School of Oriental and African Studies (SOAS) followed by a PhD in archaeology, also at SOAS. Her thesis, The Southern Cemetery of Cairo from the 14th century to the present: an urban history of a living cemetery, focused on themes which have subsequently formed the basis of her career.

== Career ==
Al-Ibrashy began her career working as an architect and a professor prior to co-founding Megawra, an Egyptian non-governmental organization architectural practice in 2011. Alongside her work for Megawra, she continues to work as a lecturer in architecture at the American University in Cairo and at Cairo University, as well as a professor of Practice in Islamic Architecture at SOAS. In 2012, Megawra partnered with the Built Environment Collective (BEC), an engineering and design consultancy. The combined group, Megawra-BEC, works as an architectural firm and non-governmental organization with a focus on sustainable and socially-responsible heritage restoration across Cairo. In the same year, al-Ibrashy began the Athar Lina (Heritage is Ours!) initiative, in partnership with the Egyptian Ministry of Tourism and Antiquities. al-Ibrashy's fieldwork engages with the communities in the Al-Khalifa district in Sayeda Zeinab, Al Hattaba district, and Al-Imam Al-Shafii district through participatory conservation initiatives, with the aim of encouraging the marginalized communities’ sense of ownership of their historic environments. A specific focus of al-Ibrashy's work is with children and young people in Cairo's economically deprived neighborhoods, and she has worked in the Northern Cemetery in Cairo. Al-Ibrashy has lectured widely, both in Egypt and abroad.

== Publications ==
=== Books ===
- Citizen Participation in Historic Cairo, The Ford Foundation (2020)
- Conservation and Management Plan Al-Khalifa Street Area, ISBN 978-977-90-8236-3, The Ford Foundation (2020)
- معايير التصميم في القاهرة التاريخية - Historic Cairo Intervention Toolkit, ISBN 978-977-90-8235-6 (2020)
- خطة الحفاظ والإدارة - منطقة شارع الخليفة, The Ford Foundation (2020)

=== Papers ===
- Closing Keynote Speech-May al-Ibrashy-Heritage as a driver for development: Athar Lina Initiative in Historic Cairo, AUC Knowledge Foundation (2020)
- The cultural heritage of Egypt's cities (2021)
- Heritage in the Street: Megawra | BEC’s Athar Lina Initiative in Historic Cairo, ISSN 2206-9658, City Space Architecture (2021)
- Design with the Senses and for the Senses: An Alternative Teaching Model for Design Studio, International Journal of Architectural Research (2010)
- The history of the Southern Cemetery of Cairo from the 14th century to the present : an urban study of a living cemetery (2005)

=== Editorial contribution ===
- Funambulist Magazine, Cairo: Hope is the thing with feathers (2020)

== Awards ==
- 2022 Prince Claus Impact Award Recipient:

al-Ibrashy was the recipient of the 2022 Prince Claus Fund Impact Awards, along with María Medrano, Argentina; Luis Manuel Otero Alcántara, Cuba; Ailton Alves Lacerda Krenak, Brazil; Hassan Darsi, Morocco and Alain Gomis, Senegal.

- 2023 ArchDaily Diversity in Architecture DIVIA Award:

al-Ibrashy was one of the five finalists for the 2023 ArchDaily Diversity in Architecture Award.
