= Teresa Surita =

Brazilian politician

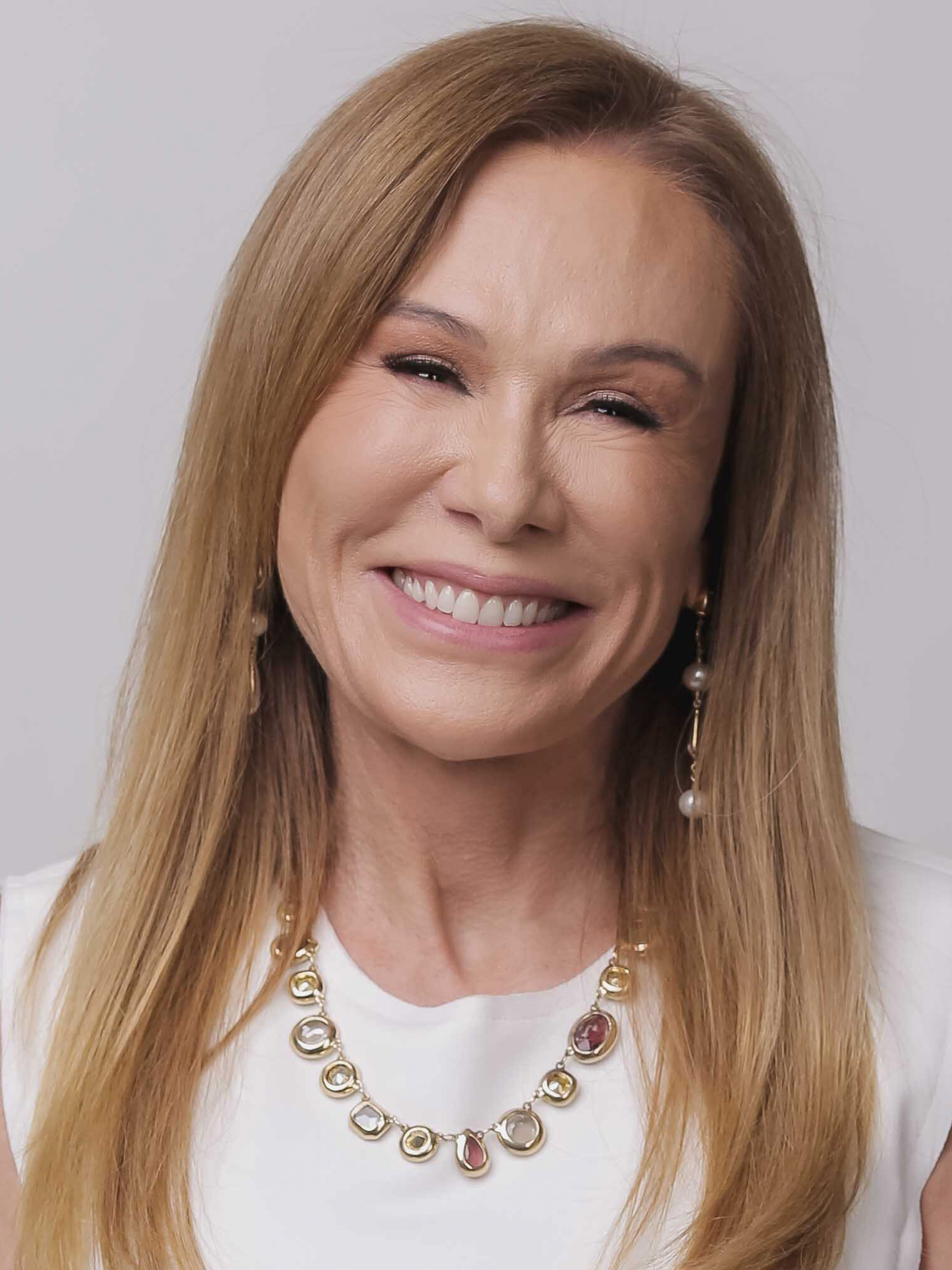

Senator-elect for Roraima
- Assuming office 1 February 2027

Mayor of Boa Vista
- In office 1 January 2013 – 1 January 2021
- Vice Mayor: Arthur Henrique
- Preceded by: Iradilson Sampaio
- Succeeded by: Arthur Henrique
- In office 1 January 2001 – 31 March 2006
- Vice Mayor: Iradilson Sampaio
- Preceded by: Ottomar Pinto
- Succeeded by: Iradilson Sampaio
- In office 1 January 1993 – 1 January 1997
- Preceded by: Barac da Silva Bento
- Succeeded by: Ottomar Pinto

Member of the Chamber of Deputies
- In office 1 February 2011 – 1 January 2013
- Constituency: Roraima
- In office 1 February 1991 – 1 January 1993
- Constituency: Roraima

First Lady of Roraima
- In role 15 September 1988 – 2 April 1990
- Governor: Romero Jucá
- Succeeded by: Marluce Pinto

Personal details
- Born: 14 August 1956 (age 70) São Manuel, São Paulo, Brazil
- Party: MDB (2006–present)
- Other political affiliations: PDS (1990–1993); PPR (1993–1995); PSDB (1995–2003); PPS (2003–2006)
- Spouse(s): Romero Jucá (divorced) Marcelo Guimarães
- Relatives: Emílio Surita (brother)
- Education: Anhembi Morumbi University

Maria Teresa Saenz Surita Guimarães (born 14 August 1956) is a Brazilian politician and a member of the Brazilian Democratic Movement. She is the mayor of Boa Vista, Roraima, and a former Federal Deputy from 1990 to 1992 and from 2011 to 2012. Surita is dedicated to issues of social policy and human rights of children and adolescents.

== Early life and education ==
Surita was born on 14 August 1956 in the Brazilian state of São Manuel, in São Paulo. Surita holds a bachelor's degree in tourism from Anhembi Morumbi University. She also served as national secretary of urban policies of the Ministry of Cities from 2009 to 2010, in the cabinet of President Luiz Inácio Lula da Silva.

== Federal Deputy ==
As a member of the 54ª Legislature of the Chamber of Deputies, Teresa Surita was:

- Vice Leader of the Brazilian Democratic Movement Party - PMDB
- First Vice President of the Special Committee of the National Education Plan
- Vice President of the Parliamentary Joint Committee on Human Rights of the Child and Adolescent
- Member of the Commission of Social Security and Family
- Member of the Board of Advanced Studies and Technology Assessment
- Rapporteur of the Special Commission for the examination of Bill 7.672/2010 for child education without the use of corporal punishment. Substitute report substitute passed in the House of Representatives, known as "Anti-Spanking Law"
- Holder of the Special Committee to examine the Bill 7.420/2006 (The Educational Accountability Act)
- Holder of the Special Committee to examine the PL 8.035/2010 - National Education Plan 2011/2015
- Holder of the Special Committee to examine the PL 1.610/1996 - Exploration of Mineral Resources on Indigenous Lands
- Alternate member of the Commission on Human Rights and Minorities
- Alternate member of the Urban Development Commission
- Councillor of Board of Directors of the Congressional Joint Municipal and Support for Mayors and Vice Mayors of Brazil
- Member of the Young Brazilian Parliament
- Member of the Parliamentary Commission of Inquiry into Human Trafficking in Brazil
- Member of the Parliamentary Commission of Inquiry into the Sexual Exploitation of Children and Adolescents
- 2nd vice-president of the Special Committee for consideration of the PEC111/2011 on the workers of the former Territories

== Articles ==
- Atenção às terras raras. O Globo, 24/04/2012. (in Portuguese)
- Terras-raras: dormindo em berço esplêndido. Correio Braziliense, 28/03/2012. (in Portuguese)
- Crianças e adolescentes, sujeitos de direitos. Folha de S.Paulo, 13/12/2011. (in Portuguese)
- Acabar com a cultura da violência. Antes tarde do que nunca. Correio Braziliense, 02/11/2011. (in Portuguese)
- Um basta à violência. Correio Braziliense, 10/09/2011. (in Portuguese)
- Copa do Mundo e salvaguardas sociais. Correio Braziliense, 17/08/2011. (in Portuguese)
- Salto de paraquedas na Barra do Vento. Blog Teresa Surita, 25/08/2010. (in Portuguese)
- Política com o coração. Blog Teresa Surita, 04/08/2010. (in Portuguese)
- Vencendo desafios: mergulhando em cavernas. Blog Teresa Surita, 11/07/2010. (in Portuguese)
- É possível recuperar jovens em situação de risco. Blog Teresa Surita, 03/05/2010. (in Portuguese)
- As muitas vítimas da violência juvenil. Blog Teresa Surita, 30/05/2010. (in Portuguese)
- Mutirão contra a violência. Folha de Boa Vista, 25/03/2010. (in Portuguese)
- Um pouco da minha história. Blog Teresa Surita, 22/03/2010. (in Portuguese)

== See also ==
- List of mayors of Boa Vista, Roraima

Honorary titles
| First | First Lady of Roraima; 1988–1990 | Succeeded by Marluce Pinto |
Political offices
| Preceded by Barac da Silva Bento | Mayor of Boa Vista; 1993–1997 | Succeeded by Ottomar Pinto |
| Preceded by Ottomar Pinto | Mayor of Boa Vista; 2001–2006 | Succeeded by Iradilson Sampaio |
| Preceded by Iradilson Sampaio | Mayor of Boa Vista; 2013–2021 | Succeeded by Arthur Henrique |
