= List of mayors of Boa Vista, Roraima =

The following is a list of mayors of the city of Boa Vista, in Roraima state, Brazil.

- João Capistrano da Silva Mota, 1890–1895, 1921–1922, 1930–1935, 1942
- Alfredo Venâncio de Sousa Cruz, 1895–1899
- José Maria Medeiros, 1899–1902
- Joaquim Rodrigues Araújo, 1902–1904
- Raimundo Nava Rodrigues, 1904–1908
- Antônio Gomes Pereira Batista, 1908–1913
- Raimundo Ferreira Catanhede, 1913–1917
- Bento Ferreira Marques Brasil, 1917–1921
- José Joaquim de Sousa Júnior, 1922–1924
- Manuel Lopes de Magalhães, 1924
- Arthur José Araújo, 1924
- Luís Gomes do Vale Quadros, 1924–1926
- Vítor da Silva Mota, 1926–1930
- João Santos, 1935–1937
- Jaime Brasil, 1937–1939
- Ataliba Barroso, 1939–1941
- João Alves de Sousa, 1941–1942
- Sérgio Pessoa, 1942
- Manoel Correia, 1942
- Edson Marques de Araújo, 1942–1943
- Aloísio Brasil, 1943
- Adolfo Brasil, 1943–1944
- Júlio Bezerra, 1944
- Temístocles Henrique Trigueiro, 1944
- Mário Homem de Mello, 1944–1945
- Cândido Pena da Rocha, 1945–1946
- Pandiá Batista Pires, 1946–1947
- Antônio Augusto Martins, 1947–1949
- Joaquim Pinto Souto Maior, 1949–1951
- Mozart Cavalcanti, 1951, 1969–1972
- Aristóteles de Lima Carneiro, 1951–1952
- Estácio Pereira de Melo, 1952–1953
- Carlos Palma Lima, 1953–1955
- Orlando Mota de Oliveira, 1955
- Aquilino da Mota Duarte, 1955–1959
- Newton Tavares, 1959–1961
- Bernardino Dias de Sousa Cruz, 1961
- Francisco de Assis Andrade, 1961–1963
- Raimundo Marques, 1963–1964
- Olavo Brasil, 1964–1967
- Armênio Santos, 1967–1969
- Antônio Maciel da Silveira, 1972
- Francisco Zangerolame, 1972–1973
- Aristóteles de Lima Carneiro, 1973
- João de Assis Aragão, 1973
- João Danilo Souto Maior Nogueira, 1973
- Rufino Carneiro, 1973–1974
- Júlio Martins, 1974–1978
- Luís Aimberê Soares de Freitas, 1978–1979
- João Danilo Souto Maior Nogueira, 1979–1981
- Rodolfo Hissa Abrahim, 1981–1982
- Alcides Rodrigues dos Santos, 1982–1983
- Miguel Guerra Balvé, 1983
- João Danilo Souto Maior Nogueira, 1983
- José Hamilton Gondim, 1983
- Luís Renato Maciel de Melo, 1983–1984
- Almir Queirós, 1984–1986
- Sílvio de Castro Leite, 1986–1987
- Robério Araújo, 1987–1988
- José Maria Gomes Carneiro, 1988–1989
- Barac Bento, 1989–1992
- Teresa Surita, 1993–1996, 2001–2006
- Ottomar Pinto, 1997–2000
- Iradilson Sampaio, 2006–2012
- Teresa Surita, 2013–2021
- Arthur Henrique, 2021–2025
- Marcelo Zeitoune, 2025–present

== See also ==
- Boa Vista, Roraima municipal election, 2016
- List of mayors of largest cities in Brazil (in Portuguese)
- List of mayors of capitals of Brazil (in Portuguese)
