= Iradilson Sampaio =

Brazilian politician (born 1952)

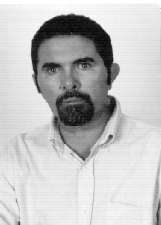

6th Mayor of Boa Vista
- In office 31 March 2006 – 31 December 2012
- Preceded by: Teresa Surita
- Succeeded by: Teresa Surita

Personal details
- Born: Iradilson Sampaio de Souza; 8 May 1952 (age 74) São José do Egito, Pernambuco, Brazil
- Party: PSB
- Spouse: Sandra Sampaio
- Education: Federal Rural University of Pernambuco

Iradilson Sampaio de Souza (born 8 May 1952) is a Brazilian veterinarian and politician. He was the mayor of the city of Boa Vista, in the state of Roraima, from 2006 to 2012. He had previously been the vice-mayor of Boa Vista mayor Teresa Surita, as well as a state deputy in Roraima. He is a member of the Brazilian Socialist Party (PSB).

== Biography ==
Sampaio was born on 8 May 1952 in São José do Egito, Pernambuco. He is a veterinarian, graduating from the Federal Rural University of Pernambuco. He moved to Roraima in 1976, when he was approved for public tender with the Associação de Crédito e Assistência Rural de Roraima (Acar-RR). He was first elected as a first substitute for Boa Vista's city council, implementing and coordinating the Centro Regional Sul (CRA/Sul) plan. He was elected to be state deputy three times. He was initially elected as vice-mayor for Surita, but later left the position. He would eventually return to office and became the city's mayor in 2006 after Surita resigned her seat to run for senator that year.

In 2016, Sampaio was arrested in the town of Cantá after driving into a car while drunk and threatening police officers, including pointing a gun at one of the officers. He was previously jailed in 2013 for administrative impropriety, in which he reached a settlement with the courts.
