= Victor Fontana =

Brazilian politician

Vice Governor of Santa Catarina
- In office March 15, 1983 – March 15, 1987
- Governor: Esperidião Amin
- Preceded by: Henrique Córdova
- Succeeded by: Casildo Maldaner

Personal details
- Born: July 16, 1916 Santa Maria, Rio Grande do Sul, Brazil
- Died: December 5, 2017 (aged 101) São Paulo, São Paulo state

Victor Fontana (July 16, 1916 – December 5, 2017) was a Brazilian chemical engineer, businessman and politician. He served as the Vice Governor of the state of Santa Catarina from 1983 until 1987 during the administration of then-Governor Esperidião Amin.

Fontana was born in Santa Maria, Rio Grande do Sul, in 1916. He received a degree in chemical engineering from the Federal University of Rio Grande do Sul in 1947.

He served his first non-consecutive term in the federal Chamber of Deputies' 46th Legislature from 1979 until 1983, representing Santa Catarina. Fontana then served as the state's Vice Governor, under Governor Esperidião Amin, from 1983 to 1987. He then returned to the Chamber of Deputies for a second term from 1987 to 1991 during the sitting of the 48th Legislature. Additionally, Fontana served as the Santa Catarina state Secretary of Agriculture and President of Celesc later in his career, as well as the President of the Bank of Santa Catarina State from 1999 until 2000.

Victor Fontana died at the Hospital Moriah in São Paulo on December 5, 2017, at the age of 101 following a two-week hospitalization for pneumonia.
