= Suely Campos =

Brazilian businesswoman and politician

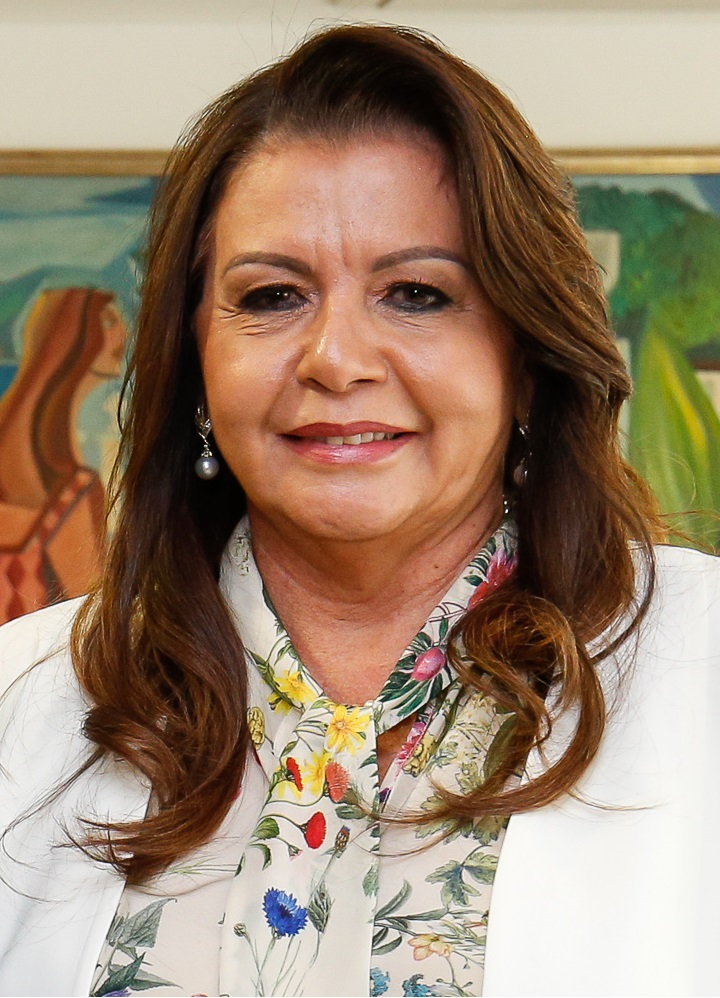

Governor of Roraima
- In office January 1, 2015 – December 10, 2018
- Preceded by: Chico Rodrigues
- Succeeded by: Antonio Denarium

Member of Chamber Of Deputies from Roraima
- In office February 1, 2003 – January 31, 2007

Personal details
- Born: March 14, 1953 (age 73) Amajari, Brazil
- Party: Progressive Party
- Profession: Businesswoman

Maria Suely Silva Campos (born March 14, 1953) is a Brazilian businesswoman and politician. She was governor of the State of Roraima between the years 2015 and 2018. She is affiliated with the Progressive Party (Brazil).

She replaced her husband and candidate Neudo Ribeiro Campos in the race for the governorship of the state of Roraima in provincial elections in 2014. She received the first placement in the first round and won the election in the second round against the incumbent governor Chico Rodrigues.
