= José de Anchieta Júnior =

Brazilian politician (1965–2018)

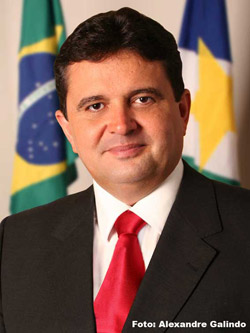

Governor of Roraima
- In office December 11, 2007 – April 4, 2014
- Preceded by: Ottomar Pinto
- Succeeded by: Chico Rodrigues

Personal details
- Born: March 11, 1965 Jaguaribe, Ceará
- Died: 6 December 2018 (aged 53)
- Party: Brazilian Social Democracy Party

José de Anchieta Júnior (11 March 1965 – 6 December 2018) was a Brazilian politician and member of the Brazilian Social Democracy Party (PSDB). He served as the Governor of the northern Brazilian state of Roraima from the death of his predecessor, the late Governor Ottomar Pinto, in December 2007 to April 2014.

== Biography ==
Anchieta was originally elected as the Vice Governor of Roraima. Roraima Governor Ottomar Pinto died in office on December 11, 2007, and Anchieta was sworn in as his successor. Anchieta was elected to a full term in 2010.

Anchieta was married to deputy Shéridan Oliveira.

He died on December 6, 2018, a victim of a heart attack. He was buried in Ceará.
