= Duda Ramos =

Brazilian politician (born 1974)

- Official portrait, 2023

Member of the Chamber of Deputies
- Incumbent
- Assumed office 1 February 2023
- Constituency: Roraima

Personal details
- Born: Duda Brito Ramos; 19 May 1974 (age 52) Benjamin Constant, Amazonas, Brazil
- Party: PODE (2026–present)
- Other political affiliations: PTB (2007–2009); PR (2009–2011); PSDB (2011–2022); MDB (2022–2026)
- Spouse: Shéridan Oliveira (m. 2022)

Duda Brito Ramos (born 19 May 1974) is a Brazilian politician serving as a member of the Chamber of Deputies since 2023. He has been married to Shéridan Oliveira since 2022.
