= Shéridan Oliveira =

Brazilian politician and psychologist

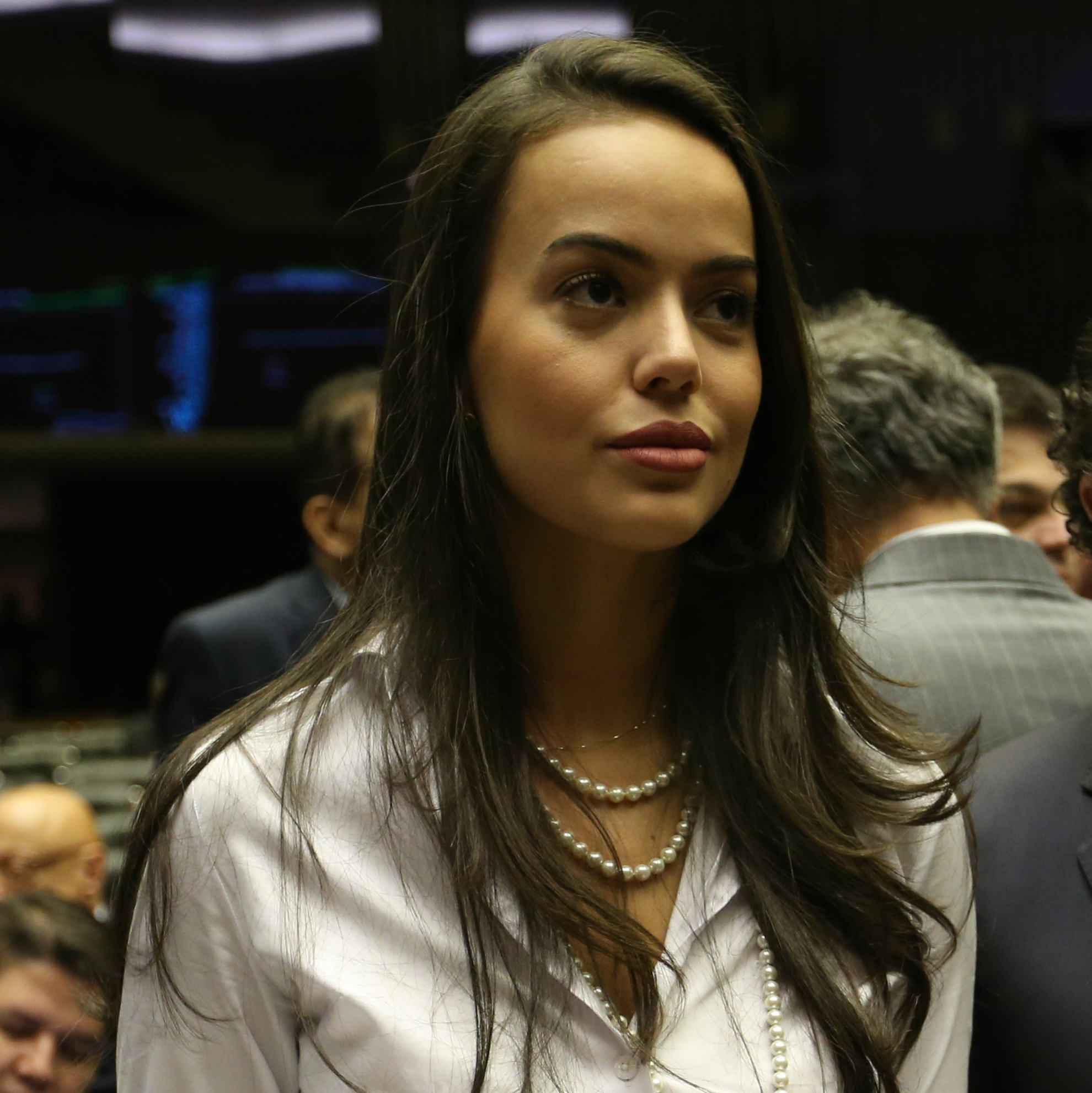

Federal Deputy for Roraima
- In office 1 February 2015 – 31 January 2023

First Lady of Roraima
- In office 11 December 2007 – 4 April 2014
- Governor: José de Anchieta Júnior
- Preceded by: Marluce Pinto
- Succeeded by: Selma Rodrigues

Personal details
- Born: April 11, 1984 (age 42) Boa Vista, Roraima, Brazil
- Party: PSDB (2009–2023)
- Spouse(s): José de Anchieta Júnior (m. 2004; div. 2015) Duda Ramos (m. 2022)

Shéridan Esterfany Oliveira de Anchieta (born April 11, 1984) is a Brazilian politician and psychologist. Shéridan was the wife of the former governor of Roraima, José de Anchieta Júnior and served as Secretary of Human Promotion and Development in his government. In 2014, she was elected federal deputy with the highest vote of her state.
