= Lucas Souza (politician) =

Brazilian politician (born 1997)

Member of the Legislative Assembly of Roraima
- Incumbent
- Assumed office 1 January 2023

Personal details
- Born: 3 May 1997 (age 29)
- Party: Brazil Union
- Relatives: Antonio Denarium (uncle)

Lucas de Souza Gonçalves (born 3 May 1997) is a Brazilian politician serving as a member of the Legislative Assembly of Roraima since 2023. He has served as chairman of the Culture and Youth Committee since 2025. He is the nephew of Antonio Denarium.
