= Esperidião Amin =

Brazilian politician (born 1947)

- Official portrait

Senator for Santa Catarina
- Incumbent
- Assumed office 1 February 2019
- In office 1 February 1991 – 1 January 1999

Federal Deputy from Santa Catarina
- In office 1 February 2011 – 1 February 2019

42nd Governor of Santa Catarina
- In office 1 January 1999 – 1 January 2003
- Vice Governor: Paulo Bauer
- Preceded by: Paulo Afonso
- Succeeded by: Luiz Henrique da Silveira
- In office 15 March 1983 – 15 March 1987
- Vice Governor: Victor Fontana
- Preceded by: Henrique Córdova
- Succeeded by: Pedro Ivo Campos

Mayor of Florianópolis
- In office 1 January 1989 – 1 April 1990
- Vice Mayor: Bulcão Viana
- Preceded by: Edison Andrino
- Succeeded by: Bulcão Viana
- In office 1 January 1975 – 1 January 1977
- Appointed by: Antônio Carlos Konder
- Preceded by: Dib Cherem
- Succeeded by: Nagib Jabor

Personal details
- Born: 21 December 1947 (age 78) Florianópolis, Santa Catarina, Brazil
- Party: PP (Since 2003)
- Other political affiliations: PPB (1995−2003); PPR (1993−1995); PDS (1980−1993); ARENA (1975−1980)
- Spouse: Ângela Heinzen (m. 1979)
- Children: 3

Esperidião Amin Helou Filho (December 21, 1947) is a Brazilian politician. Born to a family of businessmen and politicians of Lebanese origin, he was twice elected governor of the state of Santa Catarina and twice mayor of the city of Florianópolis, its capital. He was Senator of the Republic between 1991 and 1999 and national president of the Progressive Party. In 1994, he ran for President of Brazil, but was not elected. He is married to Angela Amin, a federal congresswoman in the National Congress of Brazil and twice mayor of Florianópolis.

Amin studied Business Administration and Law at Universidade Federal de Santa Catarina (UFSC). He completed his master's degree in management and is a professor in the areas of business, economics, law and planning at UFSC.

== Honours ==
- Order of the Rising Sun, Gold Rays and Neck Ribbon (2023)

== See also ==
- List of mayors of Florianópolis

Federal Senate
| Caucus created | Leader of United for Brazil Caucus; 2019−present | Incumbent |
Political offices
| Preceded by Henrique Córdova | Governor of Santa Catarina; 1983−1987; 1999−2003 | Succeeded by Pedro Ivo Campos |
| Preceded by Paulo Afonso | Governor of Santa Catarina; 1983−1987; 1999−2003 | Succeeded by Luiz Henrique da Silveira |
| Preceded by Dib Cherem | Mayor of Florianópolis; 1975−1977; 1989−1990 | Succeeded by Nagib Jabor |
| Preceded by Edison Andrino | Mayor of Florianópolis; 1975−1977; 1989−1990 | Succeeded by Bulcão Viana |
