= List of mayors of Florianópolis =

Mayor of Florianópolis
- Prefeito de Florianópolis
- Incumbent; Topázio Neto since 31 March 2022
- Term length: Four years, renewable once
- Inaugural holder: Eliseu Guilherme da Silva
- Formation: 15 November 1889; 136 years ago
- Deputy: Maryanne Mattos

The following is a list of mayors of the city of Florianópolis, in the state of Santa Catarina, Brazil.

- Eliseu Guilherme da Silva, 1889-1890
- João Francisco Régis Júnior, 1890
- João Martins Barbosa, 1890
- Gustavo Richard, 1890
- Emílio Blum, 1890–1891, 1899–1900, 1901
- Francisco da Silva Ramos, 1891, 1892
- Raulino Horn, 1891, 1899, 1900-1901
- Antônio Pereira da Silva e Oliveira, 1891, 1893–1894, 1902–1906, 1906–1907, 1907-1911
- João Custódio Fonseca, 1891
- Martinho José Callado e Silva, 1892
- Germano Wendhausen, 1893, 1906
- Henrique Monteiro de Abreu, 1894-1898
- Sebastião Catão Callado, 1899
- Emílio Blum, 1899–1900, 1901
- Francisco Campos da Fonseca Lobo, 1901-1902
- João Pedro de Oliveira Carvalho, 1906, 1919-1920
- Eduardo Otto Horn, 1907
- José Bueno Vilela, 1911
- Gustavo Lebon Régis, 1911-1912
- Dorval Melquíades de Sousa, 1912, 1913, 1914–1915, 1917–1918, 1933-1935
- Henrique Rupp Júnior, 1912-1913
- João da Silva Ramos, 1914, 1915–1917, 1918
- Abelardo Venceslau da Luz, 1922–1923, 1923-1924
- Antônio Mâncio da Costa, 1923
- André Wendhausen Júnior, 1924
- Fúlvio Aducci, 1924-1926
- Heitor Blum, 1926-1930
- José da Costa Moellmann, 1930-1933
- João Batista da Costa Ferreira, 1933
- Aristides Batista Ramos, 1935
- Olívio Januário de Amorim, 1935-1937
- Mauro Ramos, 1937–1938, 1938-1941
- Osvaldo Rodrigues Cabral, 1938
- Celso Fausto de Sousa, 1941
- Rogério Vieira, 1941-1945
- Pedro Lopes Vieira, 1945-1947
- Adalberto Tolentino de Carvalho, 1947-1951
- Paulo de Tarso, 1951-1954
- Osmar Cunha, 1954-1959
- Dib Cherem, 1959, 1975
- Osvaldo Machado, 1959–1961, 1962-1964
- Waldemar Vieira, 1961-1962
- Dakir Polidoro, 1964
- Paulo Gonçalves Weber Vieira da Rosa, 1964-1966
- Acácio Garibaldi Santiago, 1966-1970
- Nagib Jabor, 1970, 1978-1979
- Ari Oliveira, 1970-1973
- Nilton Severo da Costa, 1973-1975
- Waldemar Joaquim da Silva Filho Caruso, 1975
- Esperidião Amin, 1975–1978, 1989-1990
- Francisco de Assis Cordeiro, 1979-1983

Name	Portrait	Political party	Term of office	Info
Cláudio Ávila da Silva		PDS	1983-1984	
Alcino Vieira		PDS	1984-1985	
Aloísio Piazza		PMDB	1985	
Edison Andrino		PMDB	1986-1988	
Esperidião Amin		PDS	1989-1990	
Henrique Bulcão Viana		PFL	1990-1992	
Sérgio Grando		PPS	1993-1996	
Ângela Amin		PP	1997-2004	
Dário Berger		PMDB	2005-2012	
Cesar Souza Jr		PSD	2013-2016	
Gean Loureiro		UBR	2017-2022	
Topazio Silveira Neto		PSD	2022-present	

== See also ==
- Elections in Florianópolis (in Portuguese)
- Florianópolis history
- History of Florianópolis
- Santa Catarina history (state)
- History of Santa Catarina (state)
- List of mayors of largest cities in Brazil (in Portuguese)
- List of mayors of capitals of Brazil (in Portuguese)
