= Ítalo Otávio =

Brazilian politician (born 1986)

Member-elect of the Chamber of Deputies
- Assuming office 1 February 2027
- Constituency: Roraima

Member of the Municipal Chamber of Boa Vista
- Incumbent
- Assumed office 1 January 2017
- Constituency: At-large

Personal details
- Born: Ítalo Otávio Teixeira Pinto; 13 July 1986 (age 40) Belo Horizonte, Minas Gerais, Brazil
- Party: Republicanos
- Relatives: Ottomar Pinto (great-uncle)

Ítalo Otávio Teixeira Pinto (born 13 July 1986) is a Brazilian politician who was elected member of the Chamber of Deputies in 2026. He has been a municipal councillor of Boa Vista since 2017. He is the great-nephew of Ottomar Pinto.
