= Antonio Denarium =

Brazilian politician (born 1964)

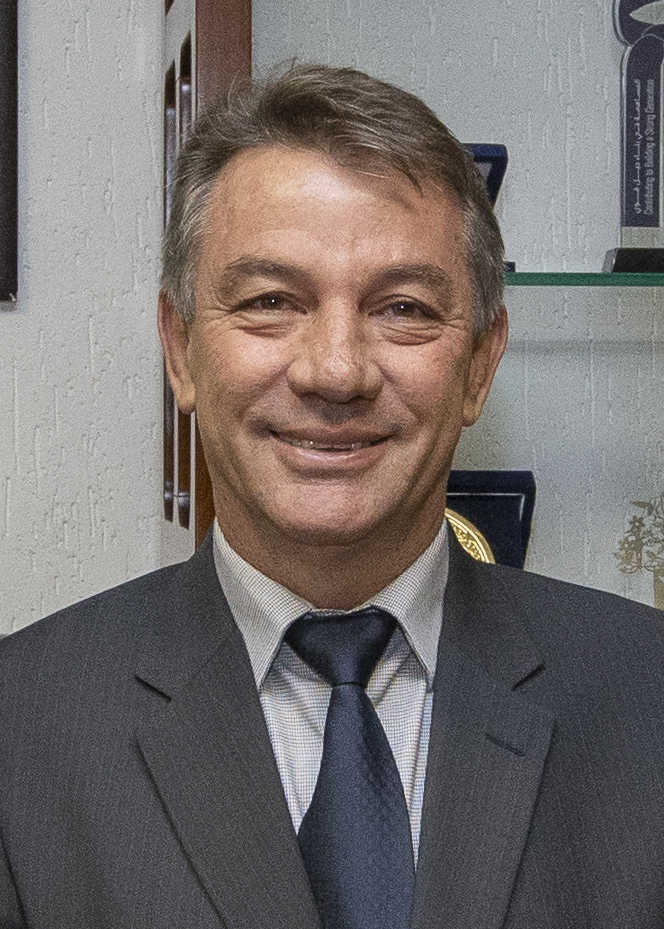

10th Governor of Roraima
- In office 1 January 2019 – 17 March 2026
- Vice Governor: Frutuoso Lins (2019-2022); Edilson Damião (2023-2026)
- Preceded by: Suely Campos
- Succeeded by: Edilson Damião (acting)

Personal details
- Born: Antonio Oliverio Garcia de Almeida; 3 March 1964 (age 62) Anápolis, Goiás
- Party: PPS (2010-2018); PSL (2018-2020); PP (2021-Present)
- Spouse: Simone Denarium
- Children: 3
- Relatives: Lucas Souza (nephew)

Antonio Oliverio García de Almeida (born 3 March 1964) is a Brazilian politician who served as governor of the state of Roraima from 2019 to 2026. He is member of the Progressive Party. A nationalist who opposes immigration, Denarium has advocated for closing Brazil's border with Venezuela in response to the Venezuelan refugee crisis. The inflow of migrants means that Roraima has a disproportionately higher Venezuelan Brazilian population compared to the rest of Brazil.

Denarium divested himself from PSL on 28 June 2020. On August 14, 2023, Denarium was revoked by the Brazilian Election Justice of Roraima for irregular distribution of food baskets during the 2022 elections.
