= Surya Brasil =

Surya Brasil is a privately held company based in Brazil (with offices in São Paulo, New York City and India) that sells natural cosmetics.

== Introduction ==
Surya Brasil was founded in 1995 in Brazil by Clelia Cecilia Angelon and began distributing product in the United States in 1997.

== Awards ==
The company's Henna Brasil Cream has won the Better Nutrition Best of Natural Beauty Award for 2009 and 2010.
