= Yasmin Hachem =

Brazilian politician (born 1996)

Member of the Legislative Assembly of Paraná
- Incumbent
- Assumed office 1 February 2027

Personal details
- Born: 22 March 1996 (age 30)
- Party: Workers' Party

Yasmin Victoria Souza Hachem (born 22 March 1996) is a Brazilian politician who was elected member of the Legislative Assembly of Paraná in 2026. She has been a municipal councillor of Foz do Iguaçu since 2021.
