= Putim prison =

Prison in São José dos Campos, Brazil

Putim prison is a prison in São José dos Campos, Brazil.

== Escapes ==
On June 6, 1999, 345 out of 456 prisoners escaped from Putim prison, a record for the Brazilian prison system. Another breakout took place at the jail last Christmas. This latest escape was the eighth in the brief history of the prison, which opened in 1995. Putim is not underequipped; it has a closed-circuit television and radio system in addition to electronic locks and alarms. São Paulo's secretary of Public Security, Marco Antônio Petrelluzzi, declared: "This was worse than just poor management. I am convinced that there was criminal participation. We believe that people inside the prison were bribed to allow the jail break.

The Putim episode is just part of frightening statistics showing that in São Paulo alone 1,245 wardens were recently indicted during a 17-month period for assisting or looking the other way during jailbreaks. Escapes from prisons across the country have become increasingly common. One week after the Putim breakout 63 more inmates escaped from prison at the Sumaré First Police District in São Paulo. This time four armed men broke into the prison, which held 76 inmates, even though it was built for a maximum capacity of 24 prisoners. Thirteen inmates elected to remain in jail The fugitives stole four cars that were parked close to the police station.

== Prison system ==
The precarious situation of the Brazilian prison system was criticized in the report Brazil Behind Bars released in 1998 by the Human Rights Watch NGO (non-governmental organization). According to James Cavallaro, the organization's director in Brazil, the Putim breakout reflects a prison system incapable of giving adequate treatment to prisoners and guaranteeing prison security: "Inmates" living conditions in Brazil are the worst, and security is lacking. Because of this, escapes and rebellions may become bigger and more frequent. An inmate can do whatever he wants, since it is very easy to take a warden as hostage."
