= Chico Rodrigues =

Brazilian politician (born 1951)

- Official portrait

Senator for Roraima
- Incumbent
- Assumed office 1 February 2019

Governor of Roraima
- In office 4 April 2014 – 1 December 2015
- Preceded by: José de Anchieta Júnior
- Succeeded by: Suely Campos

Vice Governor of Roraima
- In office 1 January 2011 – 4 April 2014
- Governor: José de Anchieta Júnior
- Preceded by: José de Anchieta Júnior
- Succeeded by: Paulo Quartiero

Member of the Chamber of Deputies
- In office 1 February 1991 – 1 January 2011
- Constituency: Roraima

Member of the Municipal Chamber of Boa Vista
- In office 1 January 1989 – 1 January 1991
- Constituency: At-large

Personal details
- Born: 23 April 1951 (age 75) Recife, Pernambuco, Brazil
- Party: PSB (2023–present; 2012–15)
- Other political affiliations: PMDB (1987–89); PTB (1989–95; 1997–99); PPB (1995–97); PFL (1997; 1999–2007); DEM (2007–12; 2017–22); PSDB (2015–16); PRP (2016–17); UNIÃO (2022–23)
- Profession: Agronomic engineer

Francisco de Assis Rodrigues (born 23 April 1951) better known as Chico Rodrigues, is a federal senator of Brazil representing the state of Roraima. Although born in Pernambuco, he has spent his political career representing Roraima, and was previously governor from April 2014 to December 2014, vice-governor from 2011 to 2014, and also served in the chamber of deputies from 1991 to 2011.

== Personal life ==
Rodrigues was born to Sebastião Rodrigues Silva and Eugênia Andrade Silva. He is married to Selma Rodrigues. Rodrigues is an alumnus of the Federal Rural University of Pernambuco. Before becoming a politician he worked as an engineer.

== Political career ==
Rodrigues served in the federal chamber of deputies for 20 years, from 1991 to 2011. From 2007 onwards he was the vice leader for the Democrats in the lower house.

Rodrigues was appointed vie-governor of Roraima under José de Anchieta Júnior, and was governor in a care tacker role until he was impeached from office for violating the state's campaign and finance laws. The ruling was considered somewhat controversial as it was Júnior who had broken these laws while he was governor and Rodrigues was vice-governor, but as Júnior was no longer in office, Rodrigues received the punishment instead.

In September 2015 Rodrigues joined the Brazilian Social Democracy Party. Shortly before the 2018 elections Rodrigues re-aligned himself with the Democrats. In the 2018 Brazilian general election he was elected to the federal senate with 111,318 votes, or 22.75%.

In October 2019, following an all-expenses-paid trip to China, Rodrigues announced his strong support for Huawei to build Brazil's 5G network.

A number of Brazilian news outlets reported on 15 October 2020 that Rodrigues was accused of stealing money which was intended to help the people of Roraima due to the economic woes resulting from the COVID-19 pandemic. The Federal Police in Brazil reported that they found R$30.000 in his underwear and more than R$100.000 in his house.
