= Edilson Damião =

Brazilian politician (born 1977)

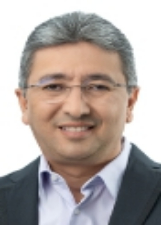
- Damião in 2022

Governor of Roraima
- In office 27 March 2026 – 30 April 2026
- Preceded by: Antonio Denarium
- Succeeded by: Soldado Sampaio (acting)

Vice Governor of Roraima
- In office 1 January 2023 – 27 March 2026
- Governor: Antonio Denarium
- Preceded by: Frutuoso Lins
- Succeeded by: None

Personal details
- Born: 13 December 1977 (age 48)
- Party: Republicans (since 2022)

Edilson Damião Lima (born 13 December 1977) is a Brazilian politician who served as vice governor of Roraima from 2023 to 2026. He has served as secretary of infrastructure of Roraima since 2023, having previously served from 2019 to 2022. He briefly served as governor of Roraima between March and April 2026, until his mandate was revoked by the Superior Electoral Court (TSE).
