= TV Escola =

Brazilian public broadcasting television network

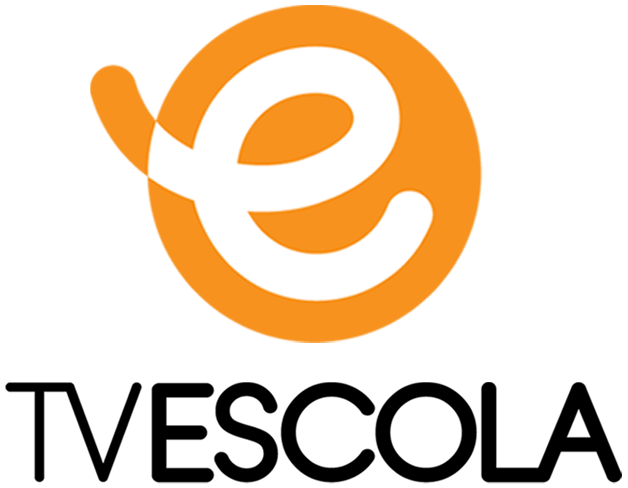
- Type: Broadcast television network
- Country: Brazil
- Availability: National
- Founded: June 2, 1995 by Ministry of Education
- Headquarters: Brasília
- Owner: Roquette Pinto Foundation
- Launch date: March 4, 1996
- Dissolved: April 26, 2022
- Picture format: 480i (SDTV); 1080i (HDTV)
- Official website: tvescola.mec.gov.br
- Replaced by: Canal Educação; Canal Libras

TV Escola (transl. School TV) is a Brazilian public broadcasting television network created by Ministry of Education of Brazil in 1995. First broadcast in 1996 in a nationwide transmission, it airs exclusively educational programs.

== History ==
The project "TV Escola" was legally approved on June 2, 1995, as part of Strategic Planning of Ministry of Education of Brazil. It was launched by minister Paulo Renato Souza through the Secretariat for Development, Innovation and Educational Evaluation (SEDIAE) on an experimental basis on September 4, 1995, in two schools of Teresina, Piauí. Its first nationwide broadcast occurred on March 4, 1996. On May 27, 1996, the Ministry of Education of Brazil extinguished SEDIAE and created the Secretariat for Distance Education (SEED) to assign TV Escola. Aimed to teachers, it was created to support them as an educational tool, and both to supplement their own training, and for use in their teaching practices. The oldest of two Federal programs created to support technological innovation in Brazil, TV Escola also distributes television sets, videocassette recorders, and satellite dishes to schools.

On December 15, 2003, the then-Minister of Education, Cristovam Buarque, launched the project "TV Escola Interativa" in a partnership with Universidade Mackenzie. The project initially occurred in seven states of Brazil—Acre, Ceará, Espírito Santo, Goiás, Maranhão, Mato Grosso do Sul, and Rio Grande do Sul, distributing in three schools of each state a multimedia kit. The kit allowed to record seven days of programing in CD-ROMs, and to contact TV Escola through telephone and e-mail, allowing the viewer to send suggestions and participate in distance education courses.

== Programming ==
TV Escola's programming is available through satellite television—which includes analog and digital television—, cable television, its official website, and applications for devices with iOS and Android system. It consists of twenty-four hours of educational TV series, cartoons and documentaries divided into five streams; three of them are aimed to teachers of children education, elementary education, and high school, respectively. The other two are "Salto para o Futuro" (lit. "Leap to the Future")—programs used as a support for teacher training courses and college courses—and "Escola Aberta" ("Open School"), which broadcast programs linking school and community. There is also schedules for teaching English, Spanish and French.
