= Açucena (politician) =

Brazilian politician (born 1999)

Member of the Legislative Assembly of Espírito Santo
- Incumbent
- Assumed office 1 February 2027

Personal details
- Born: 13 September 1999 (age 27)
- Party: Workers' Party

Ilona Açucena Chaves Gonçalves (born 13 September 1999), known mononymously as Açucena, is a Brazilian politician who was elected member of the Legislative Assembly of Espírito Santo in 2026. She has been a municipal councillor of Cariacica since 2025.
