= Soldado Sampaio =

Brazilian politician (born 1976)

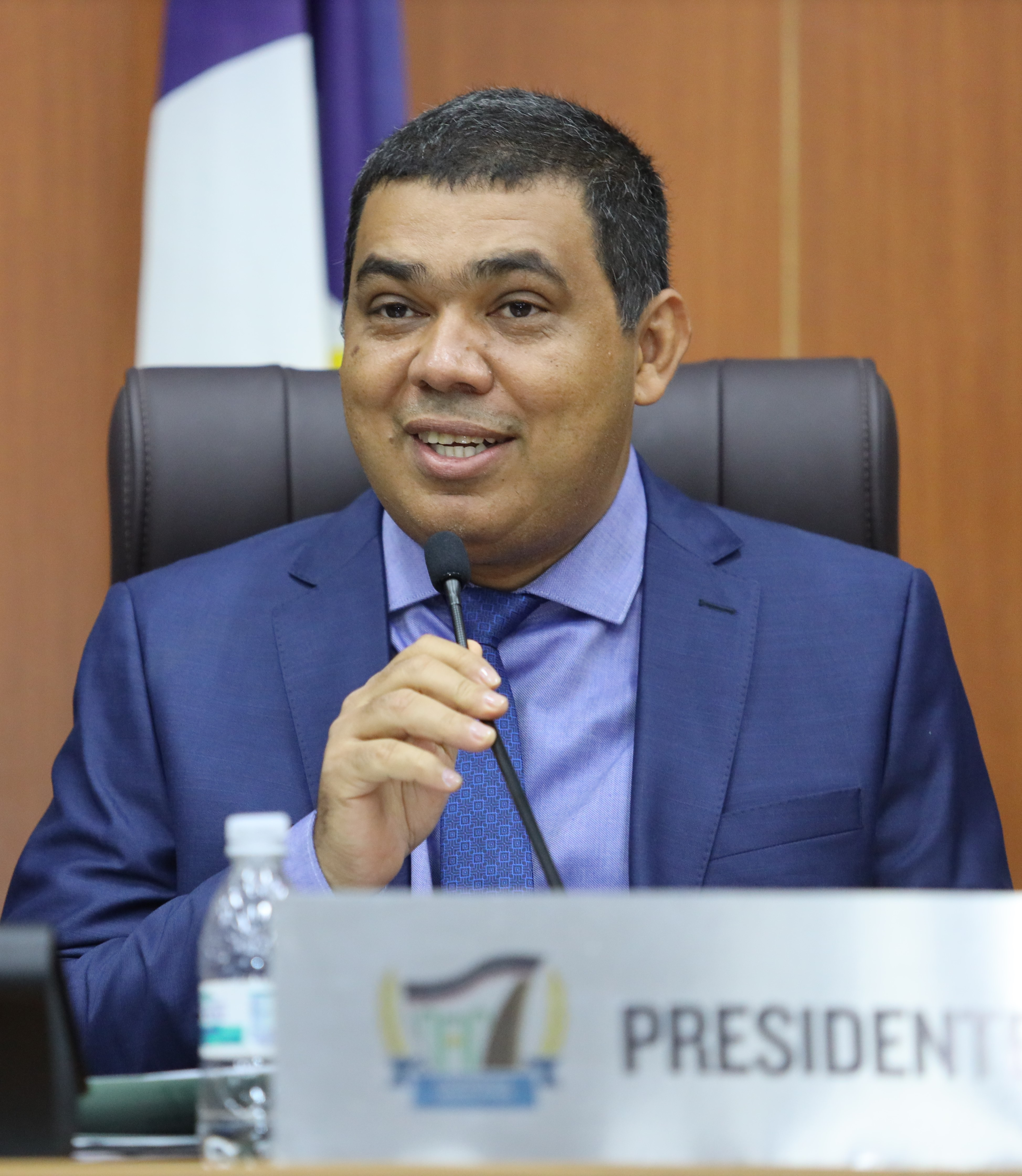
- Sampaio in 2024

Governor of Roraima
- Acting
- Assumed office 30 April 2026
- Preceded by: Edilson Damião

Personal details
- Born: 12 May 1976 (age 50)
- Party: Republicans (since 2022)

Francisco dos Santos Sampaio (born 12 May 1976), better known as Soldado Sampaio, is a Brazilian politician serving as acting governor of Roraima since 2026. From 2011 to 2026, he was a member of the Legislative Assembly of Roraima. From 2021 to 2026, he served as president of the Assembly.
