= Ottomar Pinto =

Brazilian politician

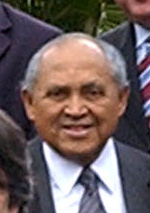

2nd and 5th Governor of Roraima
- In office March 15, 1991 - January 1, 1995; November 10, 2004 – December 11, 2007
- Preceded by: Romero Jucá Filho (1991); Francisco Flamarion Portela (2004)
- Succeeded by: Neudo Ribeiro Campos (1995); José de Anchieta Júnior (2007)

Personal details
- Born: January 19, 1931 Petrolina, Pernambuco, Brazil
- Died: December 11, 2007 (aged 76) Brasília, Brazil
- Party: Brazilian Social Democracy Party
- Spouse: Marluce Pinto
- Relatives: Ítalo Otávio (great-nephew)

Ottomar de Sousa Pinto (January 19, 1931 – December 11, 2007) was a Brazilian politician, who was Governor of the state of Roraima from November 2004 until his death in December 2007. He was a member of the Brazilian Social Democracy Party.

== Education and aeronautics work ==
He was born in Petrolina, Pernambuco. He was a brigadier in the Brazilian Air Force.

He studied in Petrolina and Recife before entering the aeronautic school at Campos dos Afonsos in Rio de Janeiro. He completed the course for a military staff in 1973 and became a colonel. During his military career, he realized six superior level courses, in civil engineering, electrical engineering, medicine, law, accounting, and economics. He completed two master's courses in the United States, and took courses for an MBA from the Universidade Federal do Rio de Janeiro (UFRJ), and law at the Fundação Getúlio Vargas (FGV), also in Rio.

Pinto undertook activities related to the construction, reform, and enlargement of some of the most important airports in Brazil. He led the Comissão de Aeroportos da Região Amazônica (Comara).

He died in Brasília.

== Politics ==
In 1979 he was appointed as governor of the then-federal territory of Roraima, which he served until 1983. This term was marked principally with involvement in encouraging settlement and socio-economic development, with an aim towards transforming the territory into a state. In 1985 he ran unsuccessfully for mayor of Boa Vista, before becoming a federal deputy from 1986 to 1990, jointly with his wife, Marluce Pinto.

When Roraima did become a state, he became its first elected governor in 1991, serving until 1995. Afterwards, he served as mayor of Boa Vista from 1996 to 2000. He entered the gubernatorial election in 2002, which he led in the first round, but lost to Flamarion Portela in the second round. In November 2004, however, the Supreme Electoral Court relieved Portela of his duties amid corruption scandals, and made Pinto governor. He won a bid for reelection in 2006, where he received 62.40% of valid votes, or 116,542, over Romero Jucá (PMDB) with 30,64%.

His widow, Marluce Pinto, is a member of the Senate of Brazil. Two of his daughters are also politicians, Otília Pinto is mayor of Rorainópolis and Marília Pinto is a state deputy.

== See also ==
- List of mayors of Boa Vista, Roraima

== Notes ==
| Preceded by Fernando Ramos Pereira | Governor of the Federal Territory of Roraima; 1979 - 1983 | Succeeded by Vicente de Magalhães Morais |
| Preceded by Romero Jucá | Governor of Roraima; 1991 - 1995 | Succeeded by Neudo Ribeiro Campos |
| Preceded by Francisco Flamarion Portela | Governor of Roraima; 2004 - 2007 | Succeeded by José de Anchieta Júnior |
