= Hassan Darsi =

Moroccan artist

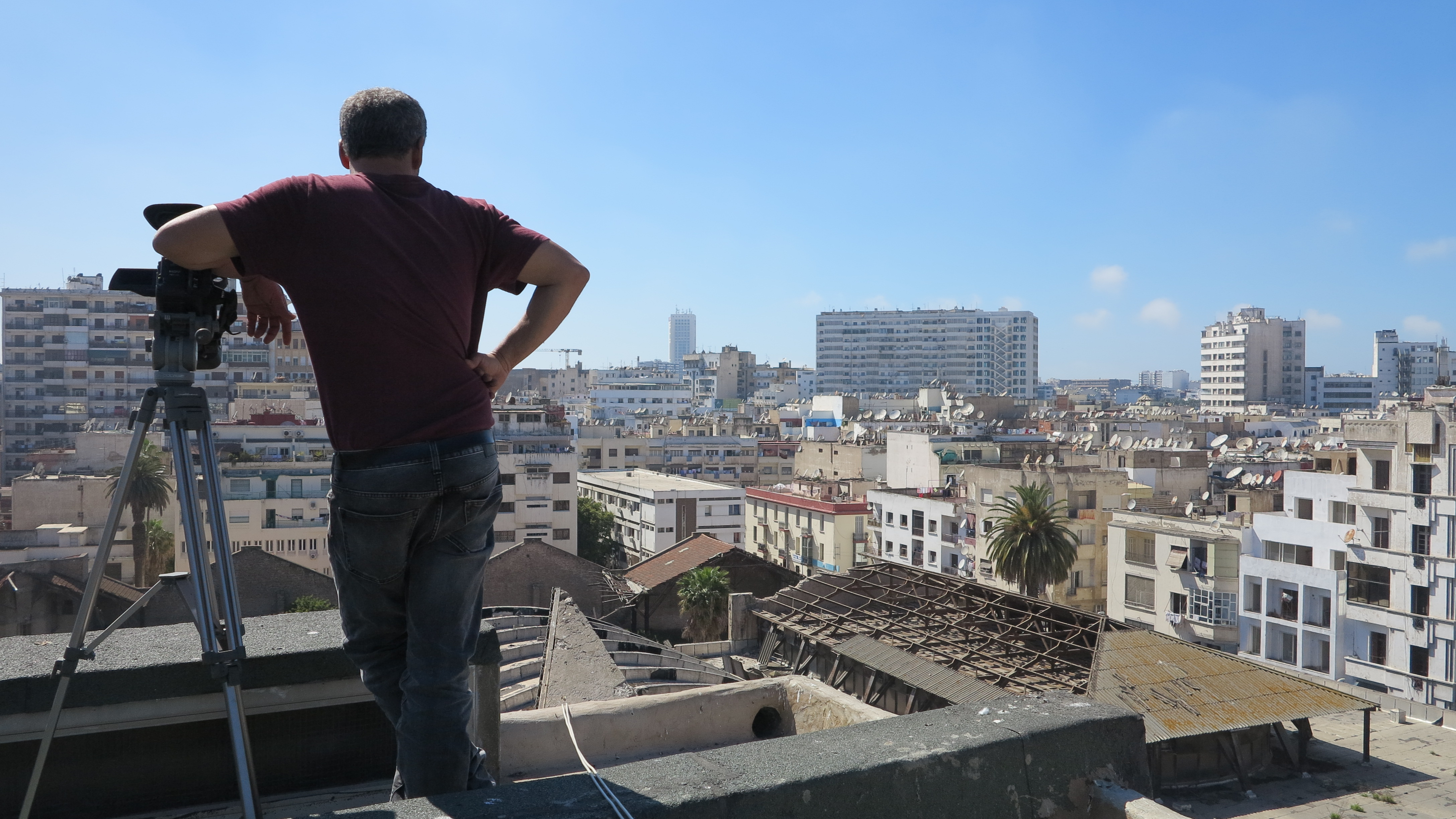
- Born: 1961 (age 64–65); Casablanca, Morocco

Hassan Darsi (born 1961) is a Moroccan artist.

== Biography ==
Hassan Darsi was born in 1961 in Casablanca. He was educated at Plastic and Visual Arts School in Mons in Belgium. After receiving his degree, he returned to his native Morocco, where he became an artist. His art works and practices reflect the Moroccan style of the time that opens to the contemporary art style.

Darsi's artistic method contrasts with the Moroccan art market, where in many art galleries the work retains an essentially commercial orientation, looking to meet the expectations of customers who are more interested in the object of decoration rather than contemporary art. In 2000 and 2010, he participated in a renewal of Moroccan artistic creation in Casablanca that included the participation Mohamed El Baz and the FJ gallery of Fatma Jelal. In 2014, one of his works (The model project) was presented during the exhibition Une histoire, Art, Architecture, Design, From the 1980s to the present day, which was an international collection constituting a counter-history of art.

His arts are a work in movement, reliant to a process obeying both constraints of presentation, space, circumstances, and the evolutions of the project itself in a creative process. His most ambitious work in this regards is probably Le Projet de la Maquette, a detailed model of the Parc de l'Hermitage in Casablanca in the state of decomposition in the 2000s.

One of his art projects known as the “scaling up” (Dixit Hassan Darsi) embraces both the needs of the design and the sometimes-radical positions taken by Hassan in contexts of resistance. A "scaling" which makes it possible to make visible what is no longer seen or not, whether it takes place through miniaturization. The "scaling up" art project is a process of reflection too (you have to find the right scale for everything ...), which leads Hassan to move to the field of art where it is not expected, in general.

His “political model project”, was another artistic design that neglected the next elections in Morocco. This design reflected his feelings on how he escapes personally from what is seen in the reality. To what some call "the creative moment", Hassan seems to confront an artistic method that seeks above all creative situations.

== Bibliography ==
- Jacques Denis and Jamal Boushaba, " «Three questions to ... Jamal Boushaba » ", Ulysse, April 27, 2010
- Mohamed Rachdi, Hassan Darsi. Action and work in project, Casablanca, Éditions Le Fennec, coll. "Abstrakt",2011, 208 p.
- Philippe Dagen, " At the Center Pompidou, a counter-history of art ", Le Monde, July 17, 2014
- Florence Renault, An implementation of the surface ... and vice versa, Casablanca, Ed. Galerie atelier 21, 2009.

== Work ==
Since 1999, Darsi's work has focused on the practice of gilding; as part of his art works, he has covered in gold an art gallery in Casablanca as well as concrete slabs in the porst of Guía de Isora on Tenerife and Marseille. In the mid-2000s, he has worked on themes surrounding city architecture. He has been the recipient of a Soros Arts Fellowship.

== Exhibitions ==
- Autrement dit, Comptoire des Mines, Marrakesh, 2024
- Portraits de familles, L'appartement 22, Rabat, 2004
- Lisiere et debordement, Villa des Arts, Casablanca, 2009
- Traversia, CAAM, Centro d'arte moderno, Las Palmas, Grand Canaria, 2008
