= Federal Rural University of Pernambuco =

Public university in Recife, Pernambuco, Brazil

- Universidade Federal Rural de Pernambuco
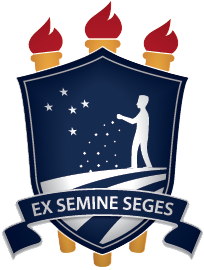
- Other names: UFRPE
- Motto: Ex semine seges
- Motto in English: From a seed, a field
- Location: Recife, Pernambuco, Brazil; 8.01°S 34.95°W

The Federal Rural University of Pernambuco (Portuguese: Universidade Federal Rural de Pernambuco, UFRPE) is a public university in Recife, Pernambuco, Brazil. Specializing in courses in agricultural sciences and other courses relating to rural development, the university also conducts research in these areas. However, in recent years the university has also added a variety of courses focused less on rural topics.

The main campus is in the state capital of Recife, while smaller campuses are in Serra Talhada, Belo Jardim, and Cabo de Santo Agostinho. The former campus at Garanhuns was split in 2018 into the separate Universidade Federal do Agreste de Pernambuco. UFRPE was ranked by Folha de São Paulo as 64th nationally in 2019.

== Library ==
The Central Library UFRPE emerged in 1914 as "book depository" Courses of Colleges of Agriculture and Veterinary Medicine "São Bento", originally in Olinda, PE. In 1938 with the change of these courses to Dois Irmãos, in Recife, the collection was transferred, occupying an area of 229 m^{2} on the ground floor of the central building of UFRPE until 1976 when the building was constructed with 1026 m^{2}. Its facilities were expanded in 2000 m^{2} over from 1980 with the construction of an annex, composed of three floors, then going to occupy physical area of 3026 m^{2}.

From 1947 to 1955 the Library was named "Library of the Rural University of Pernambuco (B-UFRPE)." Federalized, the University through Decree No. 2,524 of 04/07/1955 combined with Law No. 2,920 of 10.13.1956, joined the federal system of education as an teaching institution and library, to be called "University Library Federal Rural de Pernambuco (B-UFRPE)". That same year saw the start of the technical handling collections.

From the Decree No. 93 of 03/11/1975, the library was renamed to the Central Library of the Federal Rural University of Pernambuco (BC-UFRPE). In 1978, the Senior Management of UFRPE paying posthumous tribute to one of the masters of this house, he named Professor Mário de Andrade Lima Coelho. Historically, however, the tradition of many years, the Library until today is better known as the Central Library of the Federal Rural University of Pernambuco (BC-UFRPE).

== See also ==
- List of federal universities of Brazil
