= Legislative Assembly of Roraima =

Coordinates: 2°49′18″N 60°40′17″W

Legislative Assembly of Roraima Assembleia Legislativa de Roraima
- 9th legislature

Type
- Type: Unicameral

Leadership
- President: Soldado Sampaio, Republicans since 28 February 2022
- 1st VP: Jorge Everton, UNIÃO
- 1st Secretary: Renato Silva, Podemos

Structure
- Seats: 24 deputies
- Political groups: MDB (2) Cidadania (1) PSD (1) Democrat (2) (Note: Formerly the Brazilian Woman's Party (PMB). Not to be confused with the now-dissolved Democrats (DEM). On 2 December 2025, the TSE approved a name change.) UNIÃO (3) PP (3) PODE (4) Republicans (4) PL (2) PRTB (2)

Elections
- Voting system: Proportional representation
- Last election: 2 October 2022
- Next election: 2026

Meeting place
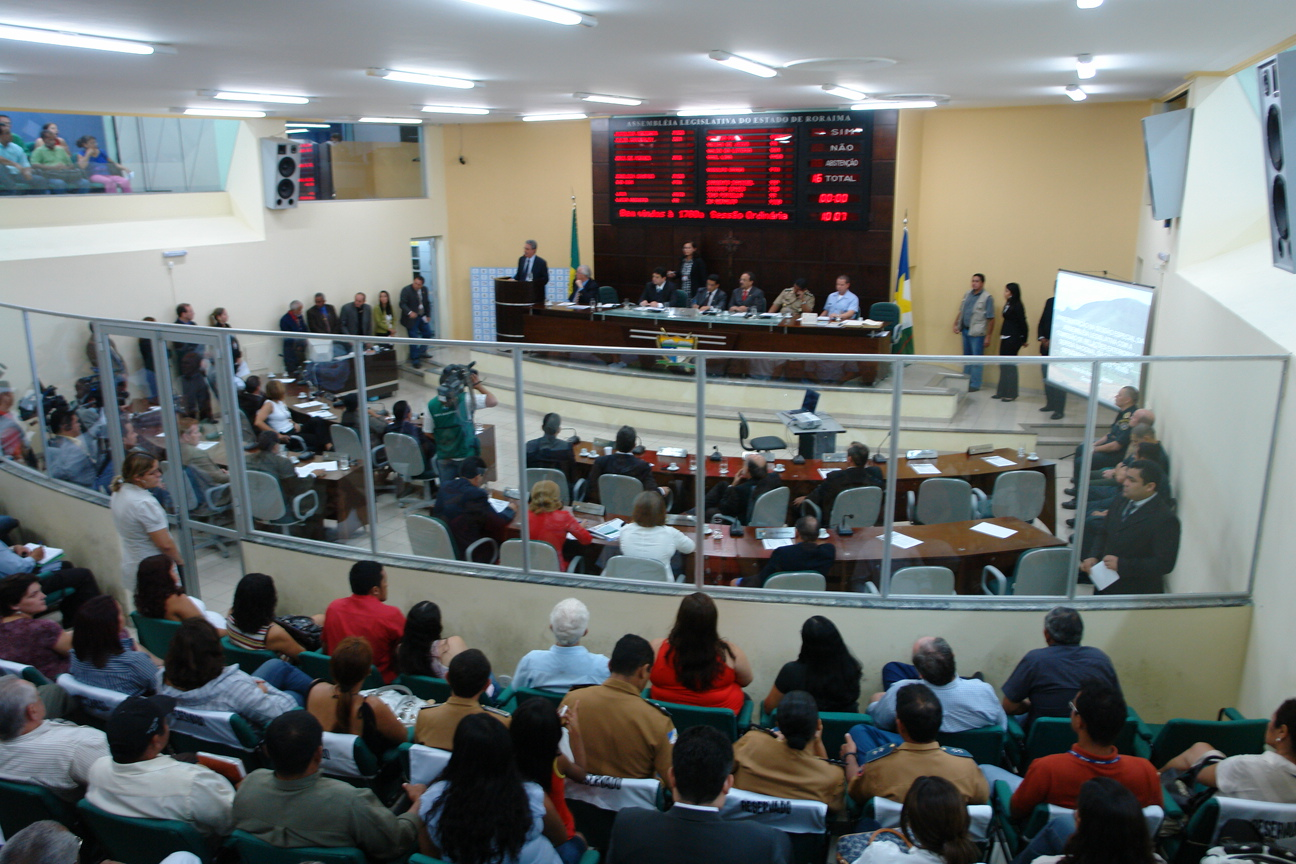
- Boa Vista

Website
- www.al.rr.leg.br

The Legislative Assembly of Roraima (Portuguese: Assembleia Legislativa de Roraima) is the unicameral legislature of Roraima state in Brazil. It has 24 state deputies elected by proportional representation.

The first legislature began on January 1, 1991 and since then has 24 members.
