= Albano Franco =

Brazilian jurist and politician

His Excellency Albano do Prado Pimentel Franco
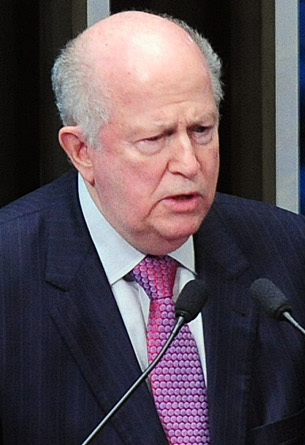

Personal details
- Born: 22 November 1940 Aracaju, Sergipe
- Party: Workers' Party
- Education: Universidade Federal de Sergipe BA (Brazil)
- Profession: lawyer politician

Albano do Prado Pimentel Franco (born August 22, 1940) is a Brazilian politician and jurist For Sergipe, he was governor and senator, both for two terms, as well as federal and state deputy
