= Neudo Ribeiro Campos =

Brazilian engineer and politician

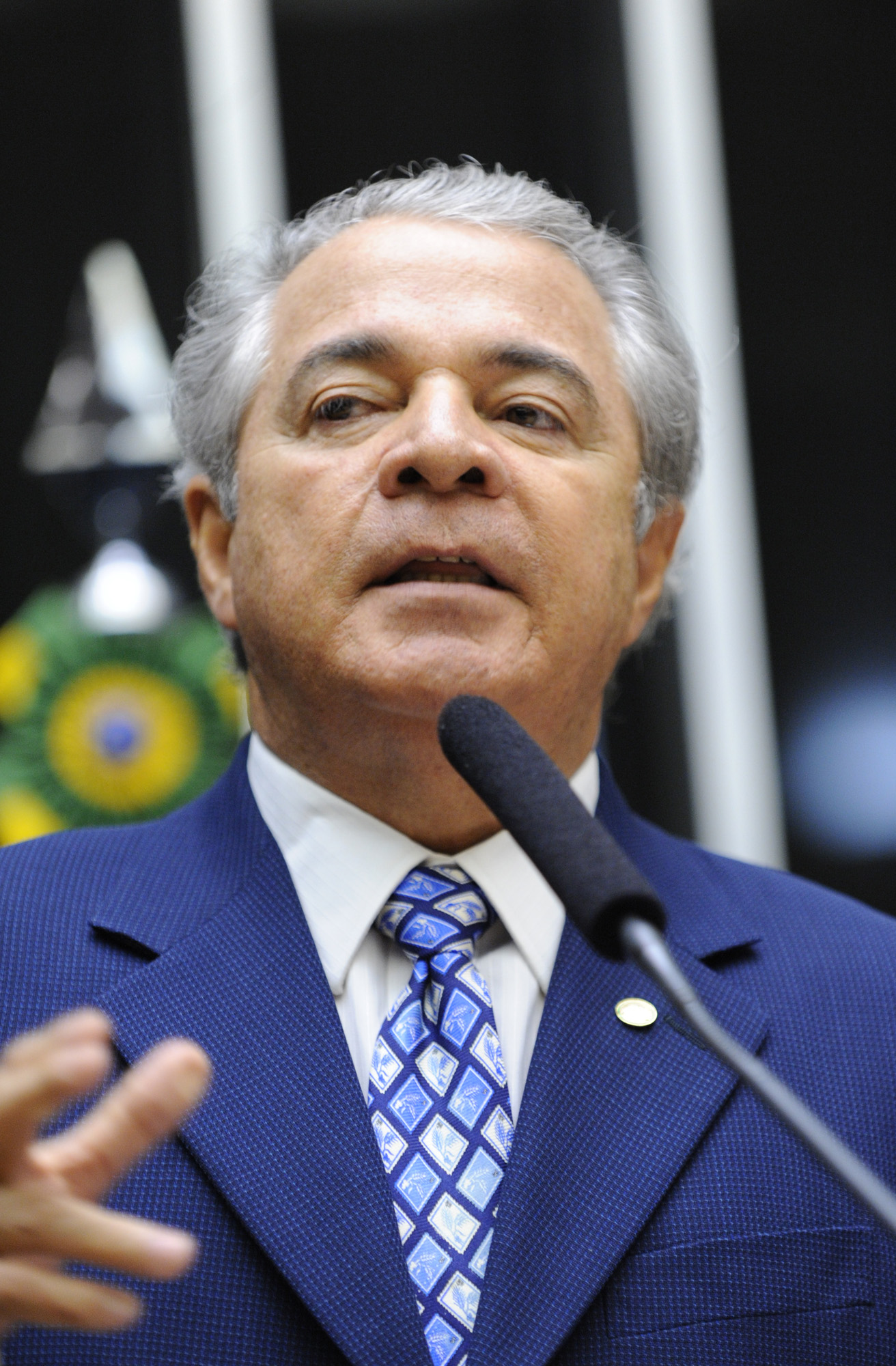

Governor of Roraima
- In office January 1, 1995 – April 6, 2002
- Preceded by: Ottomar Pinto
- Succeeded by: Francisco Flamarion Portela

Personal details
- Born: September 1, 1946 (age 79) Boa Vista, Roraima, Brazil
- Party: Progressive Party
- Profession: Engineer

Neudo Ribeiro Campos (born September 1, 1946) is a Brazilian engineer and politician. He was governor of Roraima from 1995 to 2002. He is affiliated with the Progressive Party (Brazil). Elected federal deputy for the PP in 2006, he resigned in August 2010 in a ploy to send the first instance the final judgment of a criminal case known as the "locust scandal".
