= Paulo Afonso Vieira =

Brazilian federal deputy

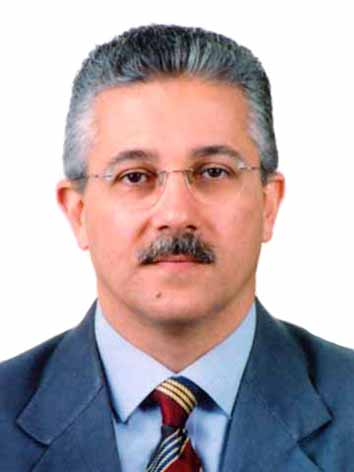
Paulo Afonso

Paulo Afonso Evangelista Vieira, better known as Paulo Afonso, is a federal deputy and member of the PMDB of Santa Catarina. He was the governor of the state of Santa Catarina from 1995 to 1999, succeeding Antônio Carlos Konder Reis and being succeeded by Esperidião Amin Helou Filho.
