= List of governors of Roraima =

#	Name	Took office	Left office	Party	Notes	Photo
1	Romero Jucá	September 15, 1988	March 15, 1991	PMDB	First appointed governor.	
2	Rubens Vilar	December 31, 1990	March 14, 1991	PSC	Senator for Alagoas	
3	Ottomar de Sousa Pinto	March 15, 1991	January 1, 1995	PTB	First term.	
4	Neudo Ribeiro Campos	January 1, 1995	April 6, 2002	PPB	First re-elected governor of Roraima. Resigned to run for another office.	
5	Francisco Flamarion Portela	April 6, 2002	November 10, 2004	PSL	Elected as lieutenant-governor, took the main office after the governor's resignation. Re-elected in 2002 and impeached in 2004.	none available
6	Ottomar de Sousa Pinto	November 10, 2004	December 11, 2007	PSDB	Second term. Died in office.	
7	José de Anchieta Júnior	December 14, 2007	April 4, 2014	PSDB	Elected as lieutenant-governor, took the main office after his predecessor's death.	
8	Chico Rodrigues	April 4, 2014	December 1, 2014	PSB	Impeached in December 1, 2014.	
9	Suely Campos	January 1, 2015	December 10, 2018 December 31, 2018	PP	First female governor of Romaima Far from the position of governor, due to a federal intervention decreed by the then President Michel Temer, on December 10, 2018.	
–	Antonio Denarium	December 10, 2018	December 31, 2018	PSL		
10	Antonio Denarium	January 1, 2019	March 17, 2026	PSL		
–	Edilson Damião	March 17, 2026	April 30, 2026	Republicans		
–	Soldado Sampaio	April 30, 2026	present	Republicans		
