= 1890 in Brazil =

Events in the year 1890 in Brazil.

== Incumbents ==
=== Federal government ===
- President: Marshal Deodoro da Fonseca (de facto)
- Vice-President: none

=== Governors ===
- Alagoas:
  - until 25 October: Pedro Paulino de Fonseca
  - 25 October-18 December: Roberto Calheiros de Meio
  - starting 18 December: Manuel de Araujo Gois
- Amazonas:
  - until 4 January: Government Junta
  - 4 January-2 November: Augusto Ximeno de Villeroy
  - starting 2 November: Eduardo Gonçalves Ribeiro
- Bahia: Manuel Vitorino then Hermes Ernesto da Fonseca then Virgílio Clímaco Damásio then José Gonçalves da Silva
- Ceará: Luís Antônio Ferraz
- Goiás: Rodolfo Gustavo da Paixão
- Maranhão:
- Mato Grosso: Antônio Maria Coelho
- Minas Gerais:
  - until 10 February: Cesário Alvim
  - 10 February-20 July: João Pinheiro da Silva
  - 20 July-23 July: Domingos José da Rocha
  - starting 23 July: Chrispim Jacques Bias Fortes
- Pará: Justo Chermont
- Paraíba: Venâncio Neiva
- Paraná: José Marques Guimarães then Uladislau Herculano de Freitas then Américo Lobo Leite Pereira then Joaquim Monteiro de Carvalho e Silva then Serzedelo Correia then Joaquim Monteiro de Carvalho e Silva then José Cerqueira de Aguiar Lima
- Pernambuco:
  - until 25 April: José Simeão de Oliveira
  - 25 April-21 June: Albino Gonçalves Meira
  - 21 June-4 August: Ambrósio Machado da Cunha Cavalcanti
  - 4 August-23 October: Henrique Pereira de Lucena
  - starting 23 October: José Antônio Correia da Silva
- Piauí:
  - until 4 June: Gregório Taumaturgo de Azevedo
  - 4 June-23 August: Joaquim Nogueira Paranaguá
  - 23 August-19 October: Gabino Besouro
  - 19 October-27 November: João da Cruz e Santos
  - starting 27 November: Álvaro Moreira de Barros Oliveira Lima
- Rio Grande do Norte:
  - until 8 February: Adolfo Afonso da Silva Gordo
  - 8 February-10 March: Jerome Américo Raposo Chamber
  - 10 March-19 September: Joaquim Xavier da Silveira Júnior
  - 19 September-8 November: Pedro de Albuquerque Maranhão
  - 8 November-7 December: John Gomes Ribeiro
  - starting 7 December Castro and Manuel do Nascimento Silva
- Rio Grande do Sul:
  - until 11 February: José Antônio Correia da Câmara and Visconde de Pelotas
  - 11 February-6 May: Júlio Anacleto Falcão da Frota
  - 6 May-13 May: Francisco da Silva Tavares
  - 13 May-24 May: Carlos Machado de Bittencourt
  - starting 24 May: Cândido José da Costa
- Santa Catarina: Lauro Müller (until 29 June), Gustavo Richard (starting 29 June)
- São Paulo: Prudente de Morais (until 18 October), Jorge Tibiriçá Piratininga (starting 18 October)
- Sergipe: Felisbelo Firmo de Oliveira Freire (until 17 August), vacant thereafter

=== Vice governors ===
- Rio de Janeiro: Manuel Torres (starting 9 January)
- Rio Grande do Norte: Pedro Maranhão
- São Paulo: Francisco Glicério and Luís Pereira Barreto (starting 22 January)

== Events ==
- 6 January – A state funeral is held for the former Empress Teresa Cristina of Brazil, in Lisbon. A mass is attended by members of several European royal families.
- 25 January – A territorial dispute between Argentina and Brazil over the eastern sector of Misiones ("Questão Palmas") is resolved by the signing of the Treaty of Montevideo by Quintino Bocaiuva, the minister of external affairs.
- 20 March – The battle cruiser Almirante Tamandaré is launched at Rio de Janeiro Dockyards.
- 22 March – The Imperial Order of the Rose is abolished by the interim government.
- October – Jorge Tibiriçá Piratininga becomes governor of the State of São Paulo, succeeding Prudente de Morais.

== Births ==
- 9 February – Carolina Nabuco, writer and translator (d. 1981)
- 6 June – Leo Vaz, writer, teacher and journalist (d. 1973)
- 1 July – Júlio Marcondes Salgado, general (d. 1932)
- 16 July – Carlos Carmelo Vasconcellos Motta, cardinal (d. 1982)
- 8 November – Astrojildo Pereira, Communist politician (d. 1965)
- 29 December – João Ghelfi, painter (d. 1925)

== Deaths ==
- 1 November – Júlio Ribeiro, naturalist novelist, philologist, journalist and grammarian (b. 1845; tuberculosis)
- 27 November – França Júnior, playwright, journalist and painter (b. 1838)
