= 1898 in Brazil =

Events in the year 1898 in Brazil.

== Incumbents ==
=== Federal government ===
- President:
  - Prudente de Morais (until 14 November)
  - Manuel Ferraz de Campos Sales (starting 15 November)
- Vice-President:
  - Manuel Vitorino, (until 14 November)
  - Francisco de Assis Rosa e Silva (starting 15 November)

=== Governors ===
- Alagoas: Manuel Jose Duarte
- Amazonas: Fileto Pires Ferreira (until 4 April), José Cardoso Ramalho Júnior (starting 4 April)
- Bahia: Luís Viana
- Ceará: Antônio Nogueira Accioli
- Goiás:
  - until July 9: Francisco Leopoldo Rodrigues Jardim
  - July 9 - November 1: Bernardo Albernaz
  - from November 1: Urbano Coelho de Gouveia
- Maranhão:
  - until 1 March: Alfredo Martins
  - 1 March - 11 August: José de Magalhães Braga
  - from 11 August: João Gualberto Torreão da Costa
- Mato Grosso: Manuel José Murtinho, then Antônio Correia da Costa
- Minas Gerais:
  - until 7 September: Bias Fortes
  - from 7 September: Silviano Brandão
- Pará: Pais de Carvalho
- Paraíba: Antônio Alfredo Mello
- Paraná: Santos Andrade
- Pernambuco: Joaquim Correia de Araújo
- Piauí: Raimundo Artur de Vasconcelos
- Rio Grande do Norte: Joaquim Ferreira Chaves
- Rio Grande do Sul:
  - until 25 January: Júlio de Castilhos
  - from 25 January: Antônio Augusto Borges de Medeiros
- Santa Catarina: Hercílio Luz (until 28 September), Philip Schmidt (starting 28 September)
- São Paulo: Francis of Assisi Peixoto Gomide (until 10 November), Fernando Prestes de Albuquerque (starting 10 November)
- Sergipe:

=== Vice governors ===
- List of Vice Governors of Rio Grande do Norte: Meira and Sá
- List of Vice Governors of São Paulo: Peixoto Gomide

== Events ==
- 1 March - In the presidential election, Manuel Ferraz de Campos Sales of the Republican Party of São Paulo, is successful, with 90.9% of the vote, replacing incumbent president Prudente de Morais who, because of ill-health, had already delegated most of his presidential duties to Vice President Manuel Vitorino.

== Births ==
- 3 January - Luís Carlos Prestes, politician (died 1990)
- 14 January - Juarez Távora (died 1975)
- 14 February - Angela Bambace, labor union organizer (died 1975)
- 6 March - Eugênia Álvaro Moreyra, journalist, actress and theater director (died 1948)
- 4 October - João Fahrion, painter, engraver, draughtsman and illustrator (died 1970)
- 28 November - Tyrteu Rocha Vianna, avant-garde poet (died 1963)
- 30 December - Luís da Câmara Cascudo, anthropologist, folklorist, journalist, historian, lawyer, and lexicographer (died 1986)

== Deaths ==
- 27 March - Princess Francisca of Brazil, the Princess of Joinville, daughter of Emperor Dom Pedro I of Brazil (born 1824)
- 9 April - André Rebouças, military engineer, abolitionist and inventor (born 1838)
