= 1925 in Brazil =

Events in the year 1925 in Brazil.

== Incumbents ==
=== Federal government ===
- President: Artur Bernardes
- Vice President: Estácio de Albuquerque Coimbra

=== Governors ===
- Alagoas: Pedro da Costa Rego
- Amazonas: Alfredo Sá
- Bahia: Góis Calmon
- Ceará: José Moreira da Rocha
- Goiás:
  - till 14 July: Miguel da Rocha Lima
  - from 14 July: Brasil Caiado
- Maranhão: Godofredo Mendes Viana
- Mato Grosso: Estêvão Alves Correia
- Minas Gerais: Fernando de Mello Viana
- Pará:
  - till 1 February: Antônio Emiliano de Sousa
  - from 1 February: Dionísio Bentes
- Paraíba: João Suassuna
- Paraná: Caetano Munhoz da Rocha
- Pernambuco: Sérgio Teixeira Lins de Barros Loreto
- Piauí: Matias Olímpio de Melo
- Rio Grande do Norte: José Augusto Bezerra de Medeiros
- Rio Grande do Sul: Antônio Augusto Borges de Medeiros
- Santa Catarina:
- São Paulo:
- Sergipe:

=== Vice governors ===
- Rio Grande do Norte:
- São Paulo:

== Events ==
- 12 April - The Coluna Prestes movement is launched at a meeting in Foz do Iguaçu.
- 29 May - British explorer Percy Fawcett sent a last telegram to his wife, before he disappears in the Amazon.

== Arts and culture ==
=== Films ===
- Aitaré da Praia, directed by Gentil Roiz and starring José Amaro
- Quando Elas Querem, directed by Eugenio Centenaro Kerrigan and starring Luiz de Barros
- La Mujer de medianoche, directed by Carlo Campogalliani and starring Paulo Benedetti

== Births ==
- 23 October: Cardinal José Freire Falcão (died 2021)

== Deaths ==
=== May ===
- 28 May: João Pinheiro Chagas, journalist and politician, Prime Minister of Portugal (born 1863)

=== August ===
- 28 August: João Ghelfi, painter (born 1890)

=== December ===
- 8 December: Mário de Alencar, poet, short story writer, journalist, lawyer and novelist (born 1872)

== See also ==
- 1925 in Brazilian football
