= Angela Bambace =

Angela Bambace (February 14, 1898 – April 3, 1975) was an Italo-Brazilian-American labor union organizer for the International Ladies Garment Workers Union for over fifty years.

== Life and career ==
Angela Bambace was born in Santos, Brazil, to Giuseppina Calabrese and Antonio Bambace, immigrants from Leonforte, Sicily and Cannitello, Calabria, respectively, who had settled in Santos, Brazil. The family migrated to New York City in 1901 and settled in East Harlem. As a teenager, Angela and her sister Marie followed their mother into garment work, like most Italian immigrant women in New York City. Together, they attended meetings held by anarchists, socialists, and members of the Industrial Workers of the World and the International Ladies' Garment Workers Union in their neighborhood. Angela became a union member, organizer, staff member, and officer of the ILGWU from 1917 to 1972.

Bambace first became a member of the Italian Waist and Dressmakers' Local 89 in 1917 and served as a key organizer in the dressmakers' strike of 1919. In the 1920s, she lived with her mother, sister, and brother-in-law—the Sicilian anarchist, journalist, and labor organizer Nino Capraro—Nino and Marie's two daughters Athena and Clytia, and Angela's two sons Philip and Oscar, in a two-family home in Flushing, New York. Angela lost custody of her sons to her first husband, Romolo Camponeschi, a waiter from Rome, in 1927, due to her labor activism. But she remained very close to both sons and their children throughout her life. In the late 1920s, she met and fell in love with Luigi Quintiliano, an Italian immigrant anarchist and tailor by trade who served as secretary to the Italian Committee for Political Victims and played an active role in the Sacco and Vanzetti defense. The two would remain together for their entire lives.

In the early 1930s, the ILGWU sent Bambace to organize garment workers in Baltimore. This temporary position became permanent in 1936, and by 1942, she was appointed the manager of the newly created Maryland-Virginia district of the ILGWU. She maintained that role after the district was reorganized as the Upper South Department. In 1956, she became the first Italian American woman elected vice-president of the ILGWU and a member of the General Executive Board.

Before joining the ILGWU, Bambace worked as an organizer for the Amalgamated Clothing Workers of America. Throughout her life, she was involved in a variety of organizations, including Americans for Democratic Action, Baltimore Community Action Commission, United Nations Association, Southern Conference Education Fund, Maryland Commission on the Status of Women, and the Jewish Labor Committee.

Bambace retired from the ILGWU in 1972 and died from cancer in Baltimore, Maryland, in 1975.

== Sources ==
- ILGWU. Communications Department biography files. 5780/177. Kheel Center for Labor-Management Documentation and Archives, Cornell University.
- Guglielmo, Jennifer. Living the Revolution: Italian Women's Resistance and Radicalism in New York City, 1880-1945. Chapel Hill: University of North Carolina Press, 2010.
- Scarpaci, Jean (Vincenza). "Angela Bambace and the International Ladies' Garment Workers' Union: The Search for an Elusive Activist." In Pane e Lavoro: The Italian American Working Class. Ed. George E. Pozzetta. Staten Island: American Italian Historical Association, 1978.
- United Press International (April 5, 1975) "Angela Bambace, 77, Officer of I.L.G.W.U. 16 years, Dies" The New York Times
