= José Gonçalves da Silva =

Brazilian politician

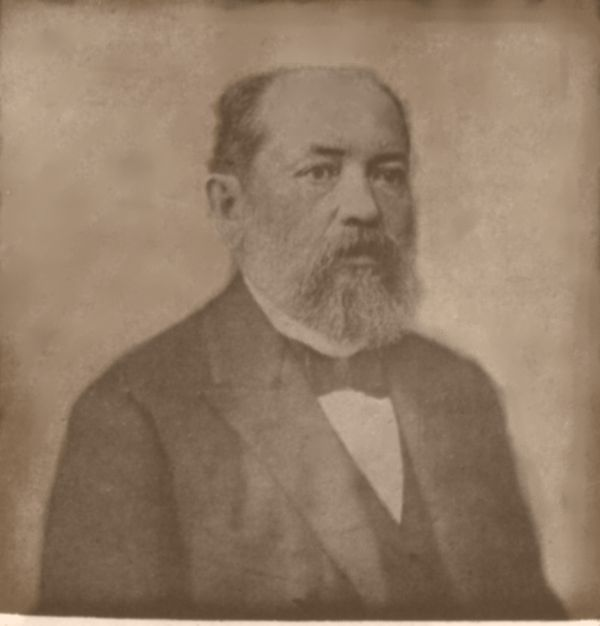
- José Gonçalves da Silva

5th Governor of Bahia
- In office 1890–1890
- Preceded by: Virgílio Clímaco Damásio
- Succeeded by: Tude Soares Neiva

Personal details
- Born: December 22, 1838 Mata de São João, Bahia, Brazil
- Died: May 15, 1911 (aged 72) Senhor do Bonfim, Bahia, Brazil

José Gonçalves da Silva (December 22, 1838 – August 15, 1911) was a Brazilian politician who served as the governor of Bahia in 1890.

== History ==
=== Biography ===
Gonçalves Silva completed his first studies in Salvador at Colégio Pereira. In 1854, he enrolled at the Law School of Recife where he remained until the third year, completing the course in São Paulo, in 1859.

Public life began when he returned to Bahia and settled in Vila nova da Rainha, affiliated with the conservative party. Living in Senhor do Bonfim, José Gonçalves exercised, already in the Empire, reasonable political leadership, which grew, with the Proclamation of the Republic, a form of government that accepted and declared in a letter to his friend and fellow struggler, Baron jeremoabo: Did you find my telegram of accession to the Republic enthusiastic? And, in fact, I joined with enthusiasm; was completely disgusted by the politics of the Monarchy and the old parties. You don't evaluate what the liberals were up to against me. If it were not for the advent of the Republic, which defeated them, I would have, though old and tired, to sustain struggles equal to that of 1863.

Still in the imperial period, he was provincial deputy (1868) and general deputy (current federal deputy) (1869-1872). In the Republic, he held the position of state senator, concomitantly with that of governor, acting in the Federalist Republican Party, which he presided over, until he was removed by Luís Viana, as a result of his deposition.

=== Government of Bahia ===
A troubled political moment occurred with the government of José Gonçalves. Appointed to the post by President Deodoro da Fonseca, replacing his brother who became ill, he took over on November 16, 1890, with the main task of managing the administration while forming the state Constituent Assembly.

As governor, he presided over the solemnity of the installation of the Faculty of Law of Bahia, now a member of the Federal University of Bahia.

This, chaired by councillor Luís Viana, was composed of a senate and a state chamber. The new Magna Carta was drawn up, it was up to the same Assembly to elect the new governor on July 2 (the state's maximum date) of 1891.

By a large majority of the collegiate, José Gonçalves remains in his post. On November 3 of the same year occurs the Coup d'état promoted by Marshal Deodoro, against which the Democratic Republicans are emerging throughout the country. However, it was not the case of the Governor of Bahia: José Gonçalves, contrary to the opinion of everyone in the state, sends a message of support for the closing of the Congress that had then been rehearsed.

An uprising was formed at The Square of Piety, that was led by the tribune César Zama. The people rose and surrounded the governor in his residence, some militiamen took part in the uprising - but not the entire the military. Shots were fired, and some people died, but José Gonçalves refused to give in.

Urged by General Tude Soares Neiva, commander of the 13th Military District, however, he had no alternative; he resigned his post in order to avoid a major disaster.
