= Granfonte =

Coordinates: 37°38′02″N 14°23′14″E

- vintiquattrucannola (24 spouts)
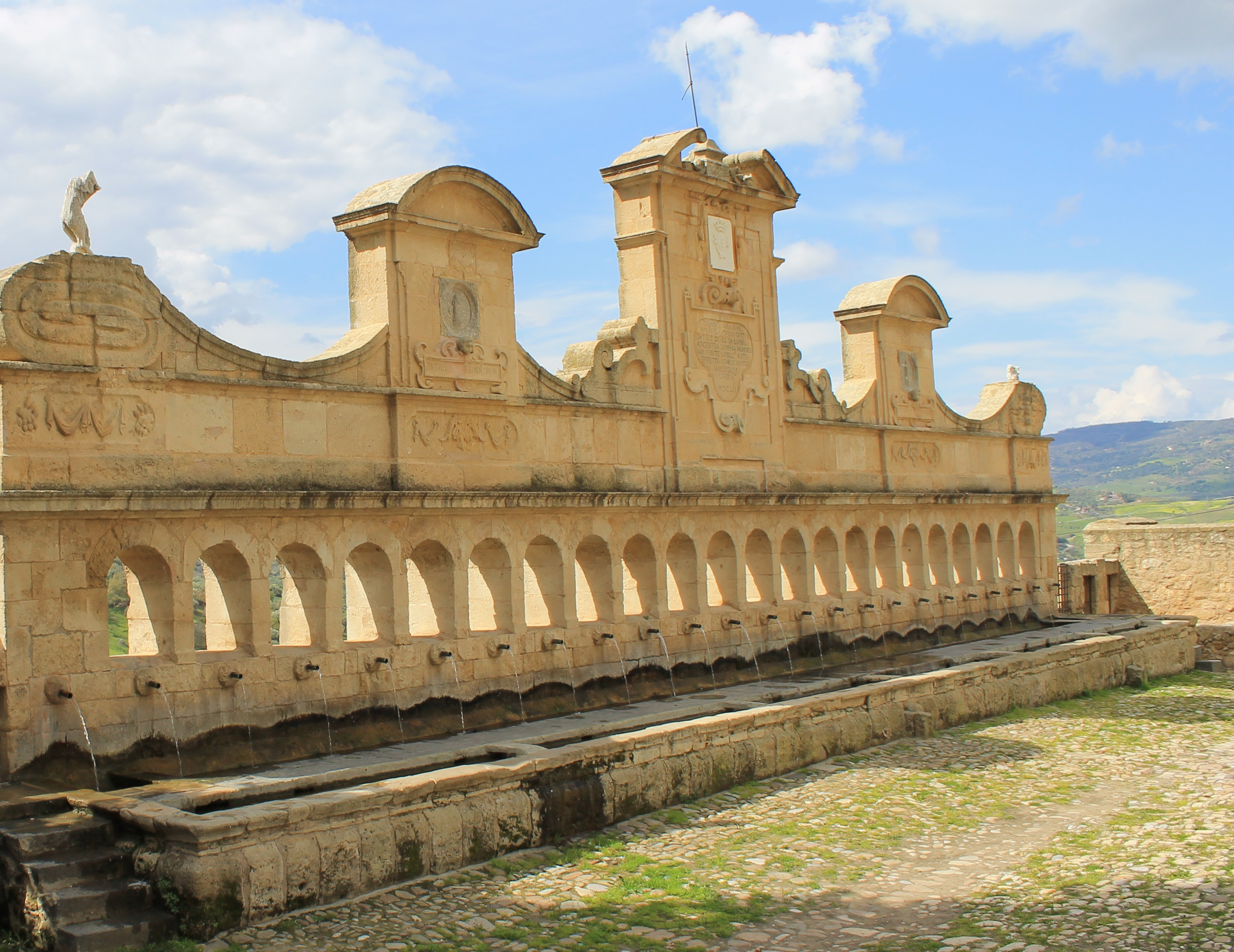
- monumental fountain Granfonte in Leonforte, Sicily
- Location: Leonforte – Sicily - Italy
- Designer: Mariano Smiriglio architect’s artistic school from Palermo
- Type: monumental fountain
- Material: sandstone blocks
- Length: from 3 to 1 meters
- Width: 24,60 meters
- Height: 8,65 meter
- Opening date: 1651

The Granfonte is a monumental public fountain built in Renaissance-Baroque style, located at the homonymous street in the municipality of Leonforte, in the region of Sicily, Italy. The elongated fountain extends for 24 meters, consists of 24 bronze spouts where it still gushes fresh spring water.

== History ==
It was completed in 1651 by Prince Nicolò Placido Branciforti, founder of the town of Leonforte. It was sited at the usual meeting-place for the town, and with its twenty-four spouts, provided ample and easy access. The work refers to various embodiments of the Flemish artists, at the time very widespread in Sicily, and is attributable to style and morphology to the Mariano Smiriglio architect’s artistic school from Palermo.

It is said that the Prince wanted to build it on the ruins of an old Moorish fountain, with a design similar to that of an existing fountain at that time in Amsterdam.

This monumental fountain was built with bearing walls of sandstone blocks from square cut and worked with sculptures in the round, low and high relief, engravings and decorations; twenty-four bronze spouts sorted pour water in the rectangular tank.

In the facade are visible twenty-two niches bottomless rectangular with round arches; central tower and two side with frames, ornaments and inscriptions, connected by spirals stone; two lions rampant on the side towers.
