= 1838 in Brazil =

Events in the year 1838 in Brazil.

== Incumbents ==
- Monarch: Pedro II

== Events ==
=== January ===
- 2 January: The National Public Archives is established in Rio de Janeiro.

=== February ===
- 28 February: The Provincial Assembly is installed in Pará.

=== March ===
- 16 March: End of the Sabinada.

=== October ===
- 2 October: The Brazilian Historical and Geographical Institute is founded in Rio de Janeiro.

=== December ===
- 13 December: The beginning of the Balaiada; a rebellion that took place in Maranhão.

== Births ==
- January 13 - André Rebouças, military engineer, abolitionist and inventor (d. 1898)
- March 18 - França Júnior, playwright, journalist and painter (d. 1890)

== Deaths ==
- April 6 - José Bonifácio de Andrada e Silva, statesman and mineralist
