= Pedro Paulino de Fonseca =

Brazilian soldier and politician (1829 – 1902)

Pedro Paulino da Fonseca (born in Alagoas on June 6, 1829 – November 16, 1902) was a Brazilian soldier and politician.

Brazilian Constitution of 1891, signature of Pedro Paulino da Fonseca. National Archive Collection

== Biography ==
He was the son of Manoel Mendes da Fonseca (1785–1859) and Rosa Maria Paulina Barros Cavalcanti (1802–1873). They had nine children. Among his famous brothers are Manuel Deodoro da Fonseca and Severiano Martins da Fonseca, the Baron of Alagoas.

He was governor of Alagoas from December 2, 1889, to October 25, 1890, and from June 12 to 14, 1891, and a senator from 1890 to 1891.
