= Hermes Ernesto da Fonseca =

Brazilian politician

Marshal Hermes Ernesto da Fonseca
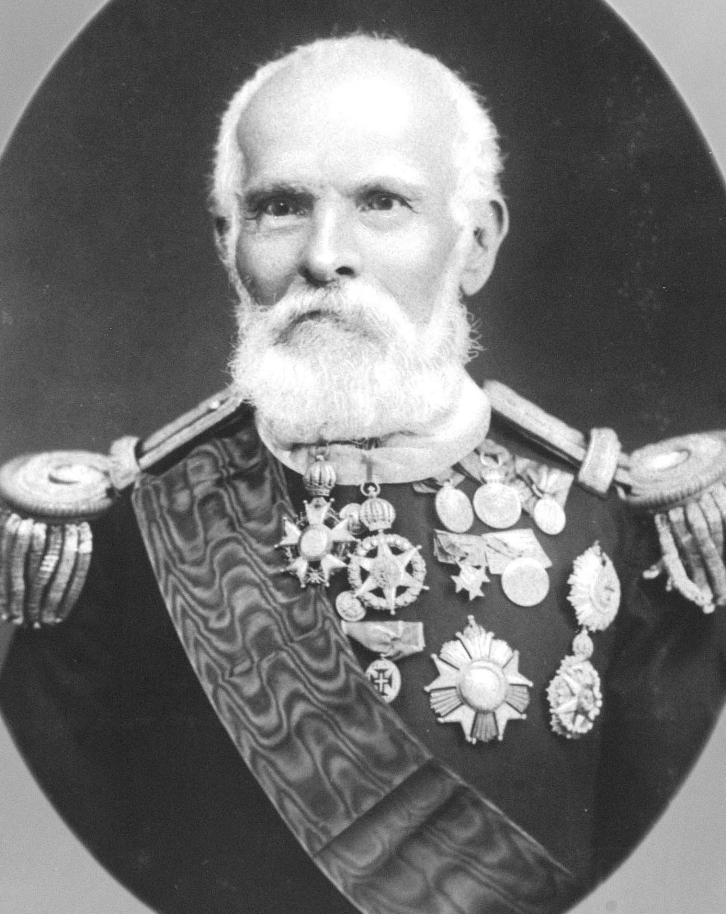
- Hermes Ernesto da Fonseca

Justice of the Superior Military Court
- In office 8 March 1890 – 8 January 1891
- Nominated by: Deodoro da Fonseca
- Preceded by: Aires Antônio de Morais Âncora
- Succeeded by: Floriano Peixoto

President of Bahia
- In office 26 April 1890 – 14 September 1890
- Preceded by: Manuel Vitorino
- Succeeded by: Virgílio Damásio

President of Mato Grosso
- In office 5 July 1875 – 2 March 1878
- Preceded by: Baron of Diamantino
- Succeeded by: Baron of Aguapeí

Personal details
- Born: 11 September 1824 Alagoas da Lagoa do Sul, Alagoas, Brazil
- Died: 7 February 1891 (aged 66) Rio de Janeiro, Neutral Municipality, Brazil
- Spouse: Rita Rodrigues Barbosa
- Children: 8, including Hermes
- Profession: Military

Hermes Ernesto da Fonseca (2 September 1824 – 7 February 1891) was a Brazilian military officer and politician.

== Biography ==
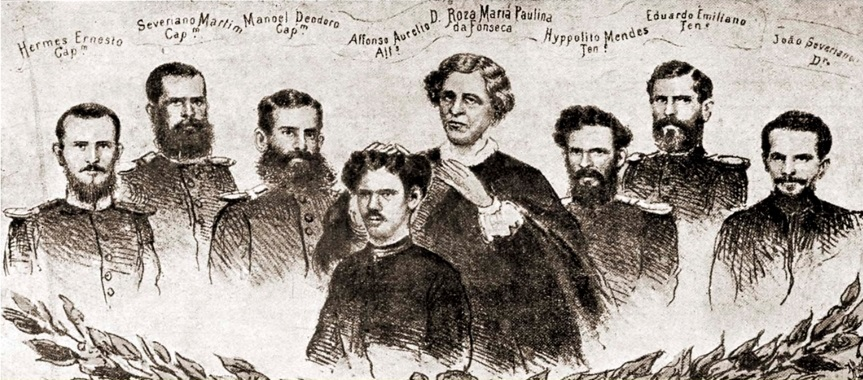
Rosa da Fonseca and her seven sons in 1865. Hermes is the first from left to right.

The eldest son of Manuel Mendes da Fonseca (1785–1859) and Rosa Maria Paulina da Fonseca (1802–1873), he was the brother of Marshal Deodoro da Fonseca and father of the future president of the Brazilian republic, named after him, Hermes Rodrigues da Fonseca. He was also the brother of Severiano Martins da Fonseca, the Baron of Alagoas.

From a military family, he pursued a career as his father and six brothers, serving in the Paraguayan War.

After the Proclamation of the Republic he occupied the command of the army troops in Salvador. Although brother of the new president, it took him along to join the new regime, only accepting it after news of the departure of the Brazilian imperial family to Europe.

He was an amateur musician, having composed sacred and military songs (such as Polca do Regimento and mazurca Icamacuá). He was married to Rita Rodrigues Barbosa da Fonseca and is buried in the Caju Cemetery.

=== President of the Province of Mato Grosso ===
He was president of the province of Mato Grosso from 5 July 1875, to 2 March 1878, appointed by imperial letter of 1 May 1875.

== Governor of Bahia ==
Bahia was one of the last states to join the new regime, succeeding several intervenors who, due to the unstable climate, did not last in the post. Appointed by brother President Hermes da Fonseca, he took over from Manuel Vitorino, who was indisposing with the federal government, staying only five months ahead of the post, stepping down for health reasons, passing the post to the vice-president, Virgílio Clímaco Damásio.

He ruled Bahia from 26 April to 14 September 1890, a period in which he sought to calm tempers and consolidate the institutions of the new regime. He revoked several acts of his predecessor, including educational reform.
