= 1872 in Brazil =

Events in the year 1872 in Brazil.

== Incumbents ==
- Monarch: Pedro II
- Prime Minister: Viscount of Rio Branco

== Events ==
- January 9 - In the aftermath of the Paraguayan War, the new government of Paraguay makes peace with Brazil, granting reparations and territorial concessions.
- Brazil held its first nationwide census in 1872, having a recorded population of 10 million.

== Births ==
- August 5 - Oswaldo Cruz; bacteriologist, epidemiologist, and public health official (d. 1917)
