= Fortaleza de Santa Cruz da Barra =

Fort in Rio de Janeiro, Brazil

- Niterói, Rio de Janeiro in Brazil
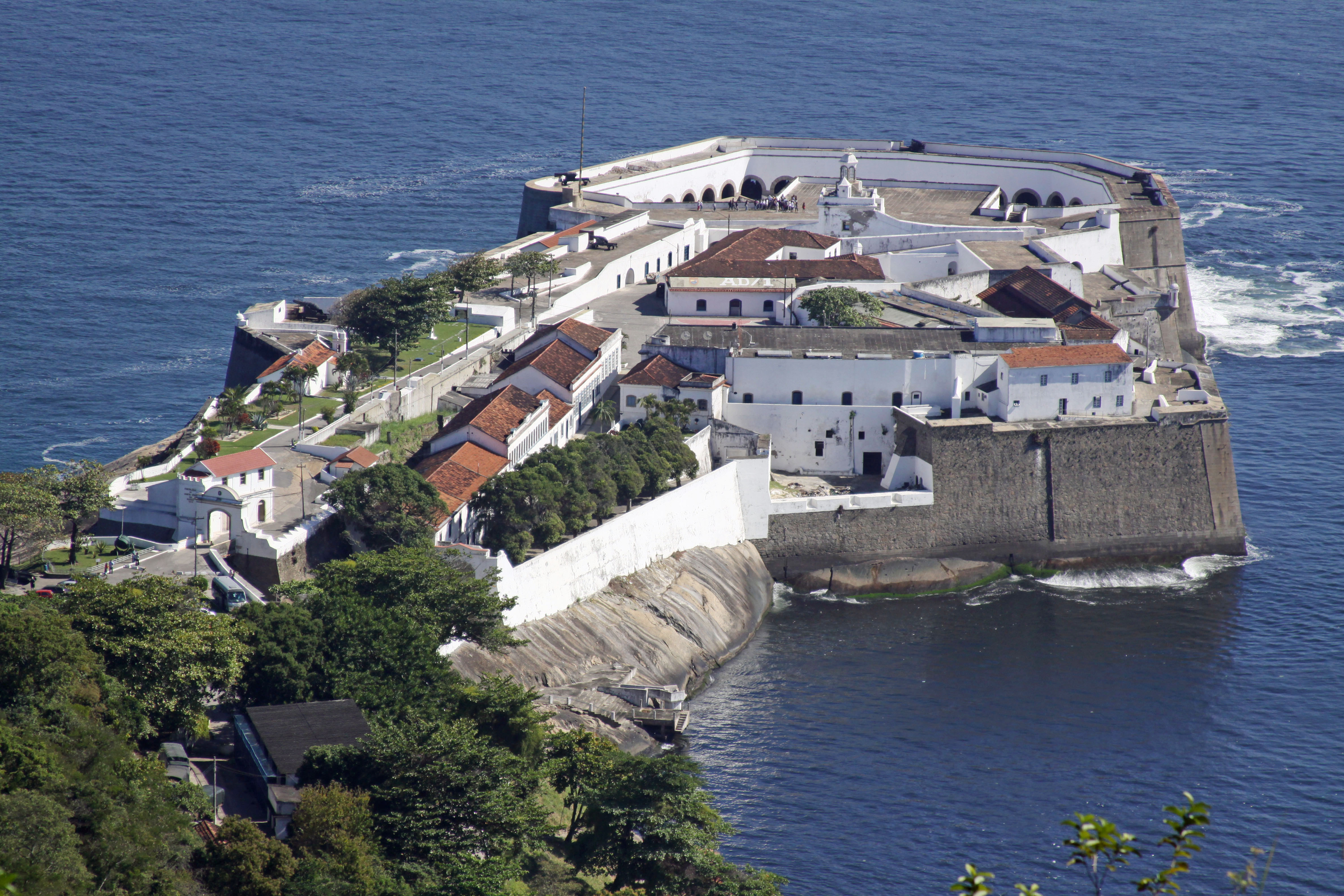
- View of Fortaleza de Santa Cruz from above

Site information
- Type: Fort
- Open to the public: Yes
- Condition: Good

Location
- Location of Fortaleza de Santa Cruz da Barra in Brazil
- Coordinates: 22.951111°S 43.113611°W

Fortaleza de Santa Cruz da Barra is a fort located in Niterói, Rio de Janeiro in Brazil.

== See also ==
- Military history of Brazil
