= Luís Pereira Barreto =

Brazilian scientist (1840–1923)

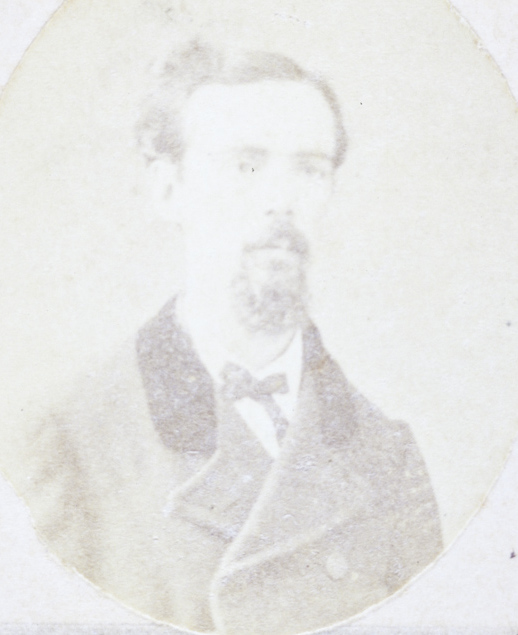
- Born: 11 January, 1840; Resende, Rio de Janeiro, Brazil
- Died: January 11, 1923; São Paulo, Brazil
- Citizenship: Brazilian
- Education: University of Brussels
- Known for: His studies on guaraná fruit; Having pioneered agronomy in Brazil, particularly in coffee and grape cultivation

Luís Pereira Barreto (January 11, 1840 – January 11, 1923) was a Brazilian physician, botanist, agronomist, and politician. He is best known for his studies on guarana fruit, which allowed him to synthesize a guarana syrup.

He served as vice-governor of São Paulo from 1890 to 1891.

== Works ==
- Teoria das Gastralgias e das Nevroses em Geral
- As Três Filosofias
- Filosofia Metafísica
- Positivismo e Teologia
- Soluções Positivas da Política Brasileira
- La viticulture à Saint Paul
- A Vinha e a Civilização
- O Século XX sob o ponto de vista Brasileiro
- Il Processo Longaretti e la difesa del Dr. L. P. Barreto
- A Arte de Fabricar o Vinho
