= Tyrteu Rocha Vianna =

Tyrteu Rocha Vianna (November 28, 1898 – September 21, 1963) was a Brazilian poet avant-garde and pioneer amateur radio, and large landowner of Rio Grande do Sul, southern Brazil.

He was born in São Francisco de Assis, Rio Grande do Sul, a small isolated town where he lived most of his life; despite this, has been regarded by critics as one of the most gifted or the most modernist poet of the early twentieth century in Rio Grande do Sul.

Had influence of Futurism mostly, but also the Manifesto Antropófago and Cubism. Has just published a book, and was author that has been little known and little appreciated by his countrymen and contemporaries. He died in Alegrete, aged 64.
