= Virgílio Clímaco Damásio =

Brazilian politician

Virgílio Damásio
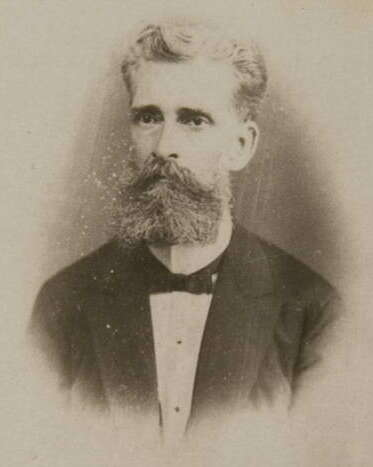
- Portrait of Virgílio Clímaco Damásio

Senator for Bahia
- In office November 15, 1890 – December 31, 1908
- Preceded by: Seat established by Decree No. 510 of 1890
- Succeeded by: José Marcelino

President of Bahia
- In office September 15, 1890 – November 14, 1890
- Preceded by: Hermes Ernesto da Fonseca
- Succeeded by: José Gonçalves
- In office November 18, 1889 – November 23, 1889
- Preceded by: Almeida Couto
- Succeeded by: Manuel Vitorino

Personal details
- Born: January 21, 1838 Itaparica, Bahia, Brazil
- Died: November 21, 1913 (aged 75) Salvador, Bahia, Brazil
- Spouse: Ana Virgínia de Seixas
- Parents: Francisco Borja Damásio (father); Maria Amália Clímaco de Sousa (mother)
- Education: Faculty of Medicine of Bahia
- Profession: Physician

1891 Brazilian Constitution, Virgílio Clímaco Damásio's signature page (eleventh signature). National Archive Collection

Virgílio Clímaco Damásio (January 21, 1838 – November 21, 1913) was a Brazilian physician and politician. He was governor of Bahia on two occasions.

== Biography ==
He was born in the parish of Itaparica, son of Francisco Borja Damásio and Maria Amália Clímaco de Sousa. He studied medicine at the Faculty of Medicine of Bahia, graduating in 1859.

He began his political life at the age of 28, running for the Provincial Assembly, already a defender of the Republic. He was vice president of the Republican Party of Bahia, when it was founded in 1889. After his terms as governor, he was a senator.

Professor at the Faculty of Medicine of Bahia, he was a member of the educational commissions of the wide-ranging reform of teaching, designed by Manuel Vitorino, whose proposals, which were too revolutionary for current conservatism, would cause the governor's removal.

== Government of Bahia ==
In the troubled period that followed the Proclamation of the Republic, Bahia experienced moments when changes in the regime seemed to lead to a confrontation between the diverse and confused currents that manifested themselves – first against the new order and then, before its inevitability, favorable.

Despite this, there was no continuity solution among those who ruled the state at the time: it was up to the Legislative Assembly, still elected in the empire, by its president Augusto Guimarães, to take over the provisional government.

The head of the medical school, Manuel Vitorino, had been appointed to the highest position in the state. However, refusing to take office in a barracks, he ceased to assume the government, for a period of thirteen days – a time when the position was occupied by Virgílio Damásio who, for all intents and purposes, became the first governor of Bahia in the republican period.

Damásio, along with other Republicans, had celebrated the proclamation on the afternoon of November 16, 1889, in a concentration in front of the São Pedro Fort. At night, an unusual confrontation had threatened the Republicans who were celebrating: the group was severely attacked by black adherents of the monarchy, defenders of Princess Isabel, members of a militia called " Black Guard " ... With police intervention, the order was made in the city.

Finally assuming Manuel Victorino, he was unable to remain in office and Marshal Hermes da Fonseca took over. Already old and in fragile health, the marshal was charge of the position for five months. He passed the position back to the vice governor during his governor ship, Virgílio Damásio.

Damásio took office on September 14, 1890, until November 15 of the same year.

He was elected a senator on 10 November 1890, and took office on 15 November.
