= Leonforte =

Leonforte Liunforti (Sicilian)
- Comune
- Comune di Leonforte
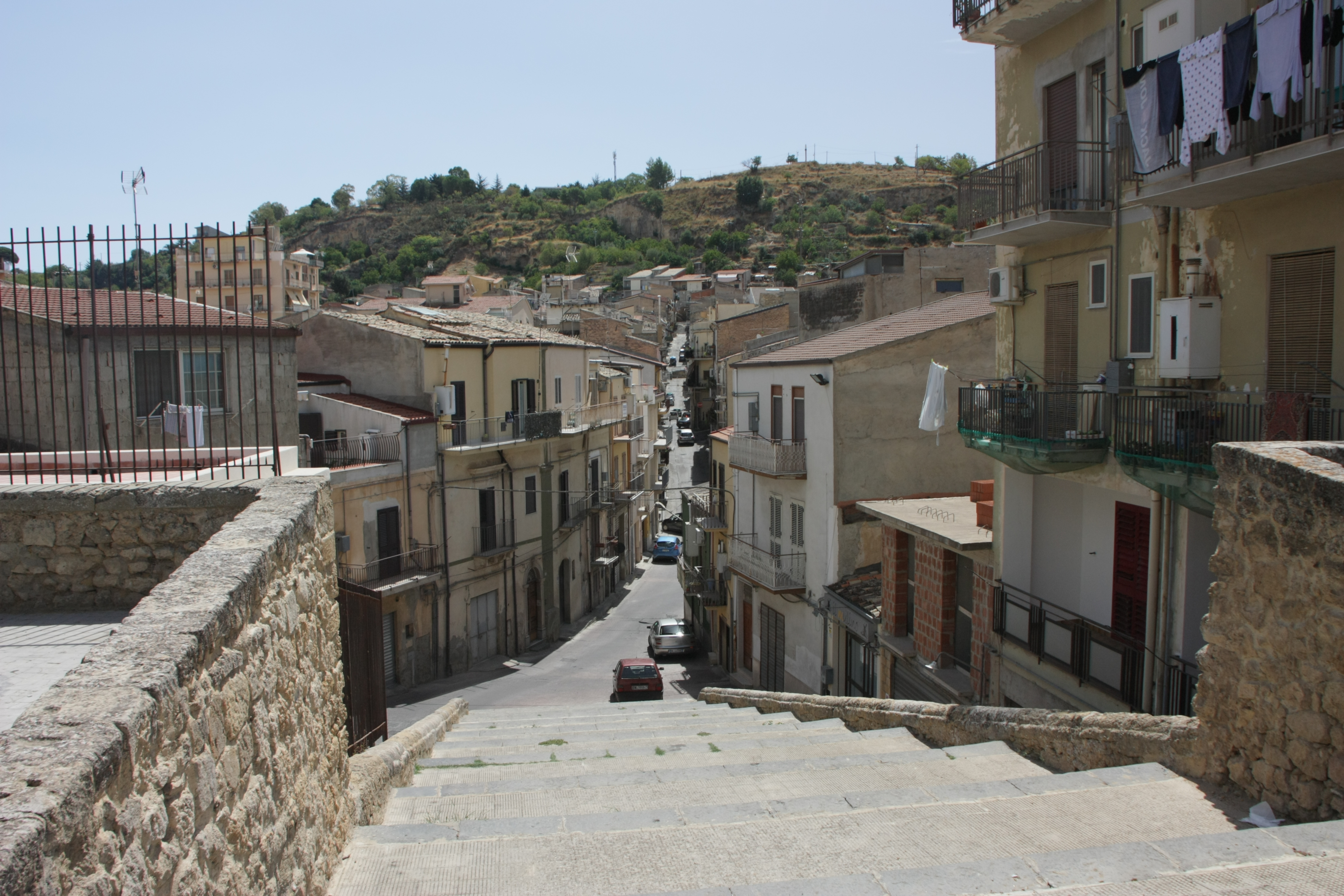
- Granfonte

- Location within Italy Location within Sicily
- Coordinates: 37°38′30″N 14°23′45″E
- Country: Italy
- Region: Sicily
- Province: Enna (EN)

Government
  - Mayor: Piero Livolsi

Area
  - Total: 84.39 km^{2} (32.58 sq mi)
- Elevation: 603 m (1,978 ft)

Population (2026)
  - Total: 12,023
  - Density: 142.5/km^{2} (369.0/sq mi)
- Demonym: Leonfortesi
- Time zone: UTC+1 (CET)
  - Summer (DST): UTC+2 (CEST)
- Postal code: 94013
- Dialing code: 0935
- Patron saint: Madonna del Carmelo
- Saint day: August 16
- Website: Official website

Leonforte (Sicilian: Liunforti) is a town and comune (municipality) in the Province of Enna in the autonomous island region of Sicily in Italy. The town is situated 22 kilometres (14 mi) from Enna, in the centre of the Erean Mountains at 600 metres above sea level. It has 12,023 inhabitants.

== History ==
The ancient settlement of Tabas or Tavaca stood in the approximate location of Leonforte. During the Byzantine period of Sicily, and later under the Muslim Emirate of Sicily, a castle was built with a farmhouse in its vicinity. Irrigation systems were introduced and many mills took advantage of the abundance of water. In 1610 Nicolò Placido Branciforti founded a city, naming it Leonforte in tribute to his family's coat of arms; a lion holding a banner with the motto in fortitudine bracchii tui.

== Demographics ==
As of 2026, the population is 12,023, of which 48.4% are male, and 51.6% are female. Minors make up 15.7% of the population, and seniors make up 24.0%.

Historical population

Year	Pop.	±%
1861	12,234	—
1871	12,065	−1.4%
1881	16,037	+32.9%
1901	21,236	+32.4%
1911	20,605	−3.0%
1921	24,382	+18.3%
1931	19,408	−20.4%
1936	16,144	−16.8%

Year	Pop.	±%
1951	18,391	+13.9%
1961	17,927	−2.5%
1971	16,364	−8.7%
1981	15,808	−3.4%
1991	15,147	−4.2%
2001	14,145	−6.6%
2011	13,878	−1.9%
2021	12,513	−9.8%

Source: ISTAT

=== Immigration ===
As of 2025, immigrants make up 4.2% of the total population. The 5 largest foreign countries of birth are Germany, Switzerland, Romania, Argentina, and Belgium.

== Main sights ==
- Chiesa Madre (mother church)
- Capuchin church and convent (mausoleum that houses the sarcophagus of Princess Caterina Branciforte, who died in 1634, and a painting by Pietro Novelli, depicting The Election of Matthias to the Apostolate
- Church of Madonna del Carmelo
- Granfonte (Fountain)
- Palazzo Branciforti
- Castello di Tavi

== Economy ==
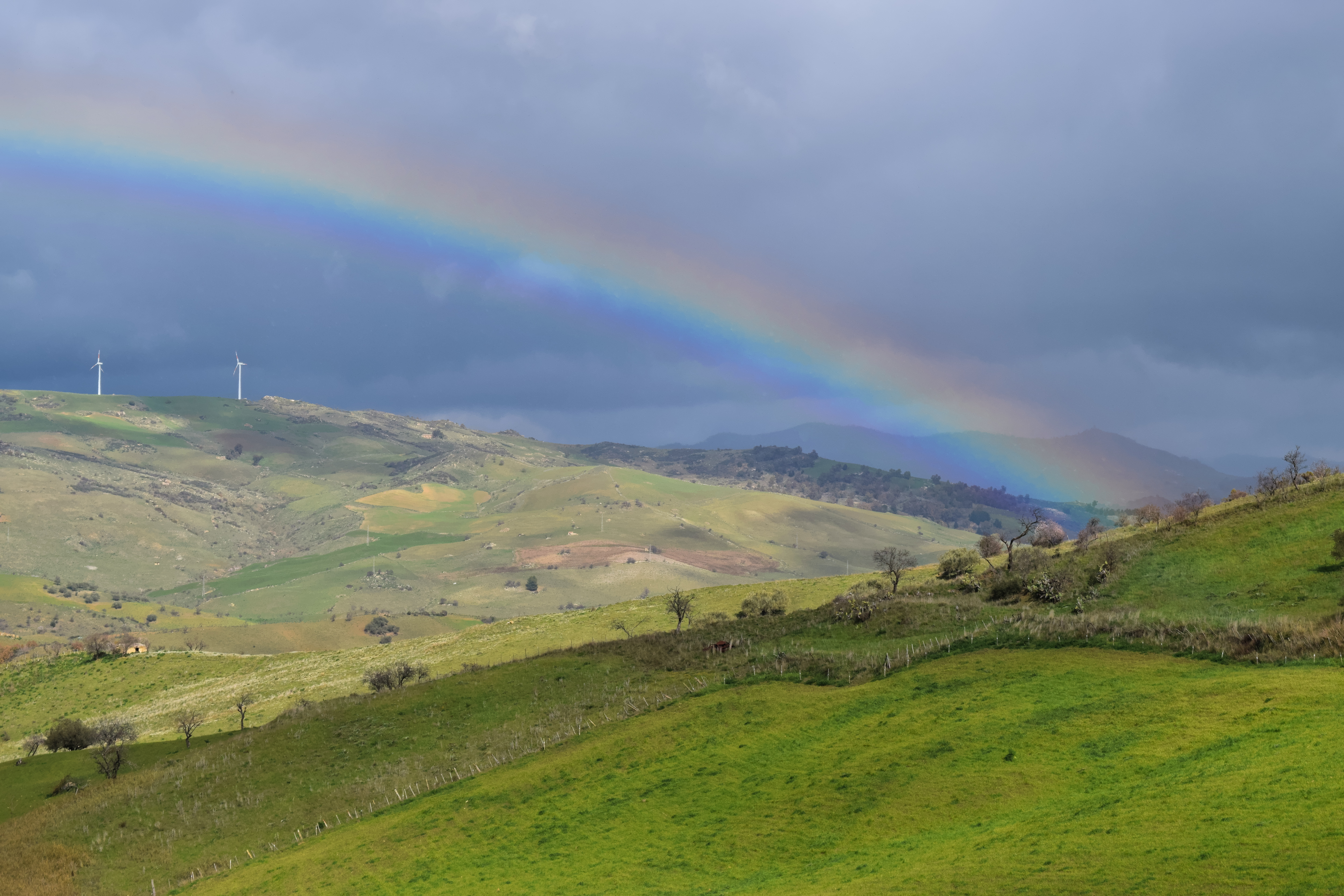
Agricultural field in rural Leonforte.

The economy is largely based on agriculture. In the past century Leonforte has always had an agricultural economy with many labourers. This has made the town a stronghold for the political left. There are a few industries located within an industrial zone. Another important activity is construction work. Leonforte has one of the highest unemployment rates of the province, at 22%. Leonforte is adjacent to the road Strada Statale 121 that connects Enna, Palermo, Nissoria, and Paternò. The train station is located 10 km from the centre of Leonforte.

== Sources ==
- Giovanni Mazzola, Notizie Storiche sulla vetusta Tavaca e sulla Moderna Leonforte, Tipografia Editrice del Lavoro, 1924
- Domenico Ligresti, Leonforte: un paese nuovo, in «Archivio Storico per la Sicilia Orientale» a. LXXIV, 1978, I pp. 89–118
