= Aitaré da Praia =

1925 film

- Directed by: Gentil Roiz; Ary Severo (co-director)
- Written by: Luís Maranhão (story); Tito Severo
- Produced by: Joaquim Tavares
- Starring: Ary Severo; Almery Steves; Rilda Fernandes
- Cinematography: Edson Chagas
- Release date: 1925
- Running time: 62 minutes
- Country: Brazil
- Language: Silent

Aitaré da Praia

Aitaré da Praia ("Aitaré of the Beach") is a 1925 Brazilian silent film directed by Gentil Roiz in the city of Recife. The romantic drama is also known as Raft of Death.

== Synopsis ==
A young man called Aitaré falls in love with a girl named Cora. One day during a raft trip, Aitaré saves the life of a rich Colonel (Felipe Rosa) and his daughter. Cora is disturbed by her enthusiasm and after some misunderstandings she decides to end their relationship when they return to the city. Five years later Aitaré will understand Cora's reasons.

== Cast ==
- José Amaro
- Antonio Campos
- Mario Cardoso
- Queiroz Coutinho
- Amália de Souza
- Valderez de Souza
- Rilda Fernandes
- Claudio José
- Mario Lima
- Luiz Marques
- Pedro Neves
- Ary Severo
- Tito Severo
- J. Soares (as Jota Soares)
- Almery Steves
- Rosa Temporal
