= Manuel Vitorino =

Vice President of Brazil from 1894 to 1898

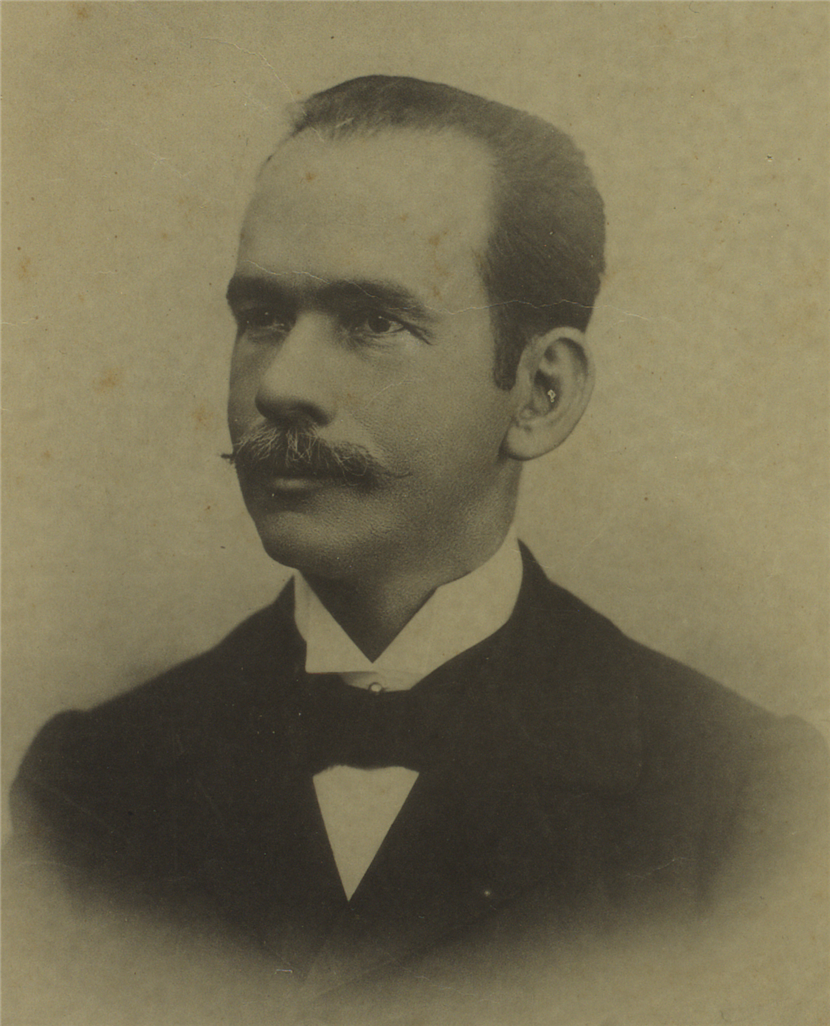

2nd Vice President of Brazil
- In office 15 November 1894 – 15 November 1898
- President: Prudente de Morais
- Preceded by: Floriano Peixoto
- Succeeded by: Rosa e Silva

Acting President of Brazil
- In office 10 November 1896 – 3 March 1897
- Vice President: Himself
- Preceded by: Prudente de Morais
- Succeeded by: Prudente de Morais

Senator for Bahia
- In office 25 August 1892 – 14 November 1894
- Preceded by: José Antônio Saraiva
- Succeeded by: Severino Vieira

Governor of Bahia
- In office 23 November 1889 – 25 April 1890
- Preceded by: Virgílio Damásio
- Succeeded by: Hermes Ernesto da Fonseca

Personal details
- Born: 30 January 1853
- Died: 9 November 1902 (aged 49)
- Party: Liberal (1876–1889); PRF (1889–1902)
- Spouse: Maria Amélia da Silva Lima (m. 1881)
- Children: 8
- Parents: Vitorino José Pereira (father); Carolina Maria Franco (mother)
- Education: Faculty of Medicine of Bahia

Manuel Vitorino Pereira (30 January 1853 – 9 November 1902) was Governor of Bahia from 1889 to 1890 and the vice president of Brazil, serving under President Prudente de Morais from 1894 to 1898. He also served as the President of the Senate from 1895 to 1898, and as Acting President of Brazil for 3 months.

Vitorino was born in Salvador, Bahia. He was a writer and a physician before entering politics. His political career was ruined when he was implicated in the attempted assassination of Prudente de Morais. After he resigned from politics, he became a journalist and frequently wrote criticism of president Campos Sales, who succeeded Prudente de Morais.

| Preceded by Floriano Peixoto | Vice President of Brazil; 1894–1898 | Succeeded by Rosa e Silva |
| Preceded by Prudente de Morais | Acting President of Brazil; 1896–1897 | Succeeded by Prudente de Morais |
