= João Ghelfi =

Brazilian painter (1890–1925)

- Born: December 29, 1890; Curitiba, Brazil
- Died: 28 August 1925 (aged 34)

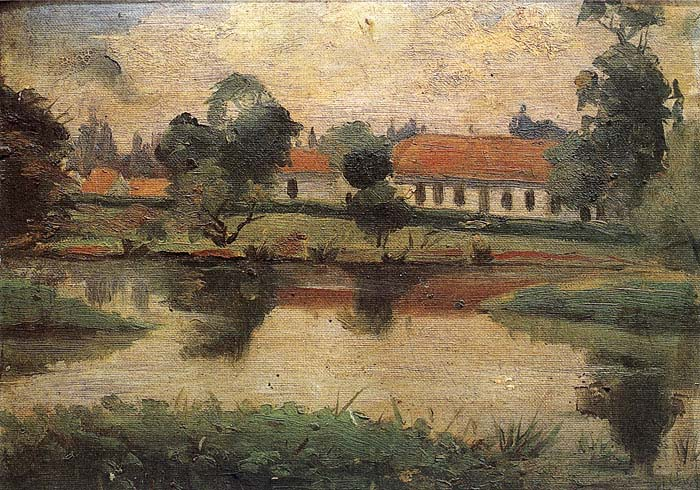
"Passeio Público" (Public Park)

João Ghelfi (December 29, 1890 – August 28, 1925) was a Brazilian painter.

João Ghelfi was born in Curitiba on December 29, 1890. He belonged to the first group of Paranaense painters taught by master Alfredo Andersen. Together with Gustavo Kopp and others, he shook Curitiba's placid life of the 1920s with his dissipated and irreverent life.

He went to Paris on his own for six months, studying and attending painting classes. After returning to Curitiba, he transformed his studio into a meeting place for artists and writers. There, according to Lange de Morretes, Ghelfi imagined a Paranaense architectonic style, developed later on by Turin and Lange as part of the Paranista Movement proposals.

His premature demise, in his home town of Curitiba, aged 34, and the possible destruction of part of his paintings explain the small number of works left by Ghelfi, in spite of which he has an outstanding place in the Paranaense art history. Many of the portraits he made are lost, but caused admiration among critics, specially because of Freyesleben's comments about the "square men and women" that Ghelfi had painted after his return from Europe, which seems to justify his enrollment in cubism. "Passeio Público" (Public Park) is particularly meaningful as an example of his aesthetic options and as a document of one of the most traditional Curitiba recesses, also painted by Andersen. This painting reveals how he could integrate the whole and how he treated colours and luminosity.
