= Deodoro da Fonseca =

President of Brazil from 1889 to 1891

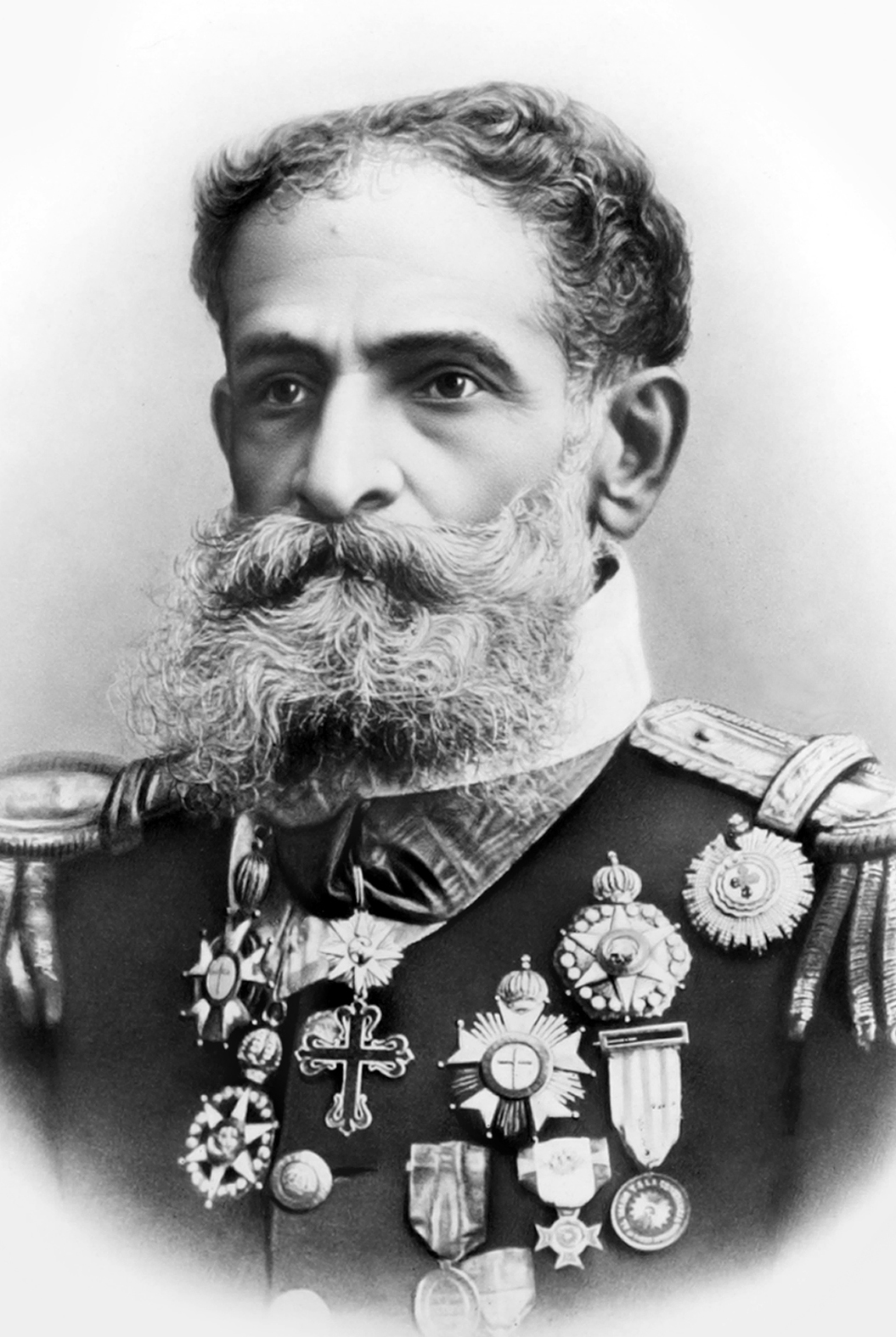
- Official portrait, 1889

1st President of Brazil
- In office 25 February 1891 – 23 November 1891
- Vice President: Floriano Peixoto
- Preceded by: Pedro II (Emperor)
- Succeeded by: Floriano Peixoto

President of the Military Club
- In office 26 June 1887 – 15 November 1889
- Preceded by: Office established
- Succeeded by: Benjamin Constant

President of Rio Grande do Sul
- In office 8 May 1886 – 9 November 1886
- Preceded by: Baron of Lucena
- Succeeded by: Miguel Calmon

Personal details
- Born: 5 August 1827 Alagoas da Lagoa do Sul, Alagoas, Empire of Brazil
- Died: 23 August 1892 (aged 65) Rio de Janeiro, Federal District, Brazil
- Party: Independent
- Spouse: Mariana Meireles (m. 1860)
- Relations: Hermes da Fonseca (nephew); Hermes Ernesto da Fonseca (brother); Rufino Galvão (cousin)
- Parent(s): Manuel Mendes da Fonseca Galvão (father); Rosa Maria Paulina de Barros Cavalcanti (mother)
- Education: Military School of Rio de Janeiro

Military service
- Allegiance: Empire of Brazil; Brazil
- Branch/service: Brazilian Army
- Years of service: 1843–1892
- Rank: Generalíssimo (Army); Almirantíssimo (Navy)
- Commands: See list: 1st Foot Artillery Battalion; 24th Volunteer Corps of the Fatherland; 1st Mounted Artillery Regiment; Command of Arms of Bahia; Command of Arms of Rio Grande do Sul; Army Quartermaster; Command of Arms of Mato Grosso
- Battles/wars: See list: Praieira Revolt; Uruguayan War; Paraguayan War; Battle of Estero Bellaco; Battle of Tuyutí; Battle of Potrero Obella; Battle of Taji; Siege of Humaitá; Battle of Angostura; Battle of Piribebuy; Brazilian Naval Revolts
- Awards: Order of the Southern Cross

Manuel Deodoro da Fonseca (Note: Portuguese pronunciation: [mɐnuˈɛw deoˈdɔɾu da fõˈsekɐ]) (5 August 1827 – 23 August 1892) was a Brazilian military officer and politician who served as the first president of Brazil after leading the coup d'état that deposed Emperor Pedro II and established the First Brazilian Republic on 15 November 1889. Following the coup, Fonseca served as head of the provisional government and was subsequently elected in 1891 by the Constituent Congress as Brazil's first constitutional president. Fonseca resigned from office on 23 November 1891 under great political pressure after dissolving the National Congress on 3 November, being succeeded by vice president Floriano Peixoto. He died less than a year later.

Born in Alagoas in a military family, Fonseca studied artillery at the Military School of Rio de Janeiro between 1843 and 1847, and later took part in several military campaigns during the Brazilian Empire, most notably the Praieira Revolt, the Uruguayan War, and the Paraguayan War, becoming a national figure. In 1885, he became vice-president of the province of Rio Grande do Sul; the following year, upon the resignation of the incumbent president, the Baron of Lucena, Fonseca became president of Rio Grande do Sul. Due to his involvement in what became known as the "Military Question"—clashes between the armed forces and the imperial government—he returned to Rio de Janeiro. Appointed to the military command of the province of Mato Grosso in 1888, he resigned from office the following year following the appointment of the Empire's final ministerial cabinet, led by Prime Minister Afonso Celso, the Viscount of Ouro Preto. Amidst various crises plaguing the Brazilian monarchy, Fonseca led the coup d'état that deposed the Empire and proclaimed the republic in the country.

With the change in the system of government, Fonseca assumed command of the country as head of the Provisional Government of the Republic. The initial changes under his administration included the creation of the Brazilian Penal Code, the reform of the Brazilian Commercial Code, and measures that formalized the separation of Church and State—such as the establishment of civil marriage and the secularization of cemeteries. On the economic front, the country experienced the so-called "Encilhamento" crisis, a massive speculative bubble and high inflation, which stemmed from the economic policies of his Minister of Finance, Ruy Barbosa. In 1891, the nation's first republican constitution was enacted, and Fonseca was elected president through indirect vote. His constitutional government was marked by intense political tension between his own centralizing tendencies and the federalist inclinations held by civil society and segments of the military—a conflict that ultimately led to the dissolution of the National Congress on 3 November. Faced with the threat of the First Naval Revolt, Fonseca resigned from the presidency on 23 November 1891. He died the following year, on 23 August, after suffering a severe bout of dyspnea.

== Early life, 1827–1843 ==
=== Birth and family ===
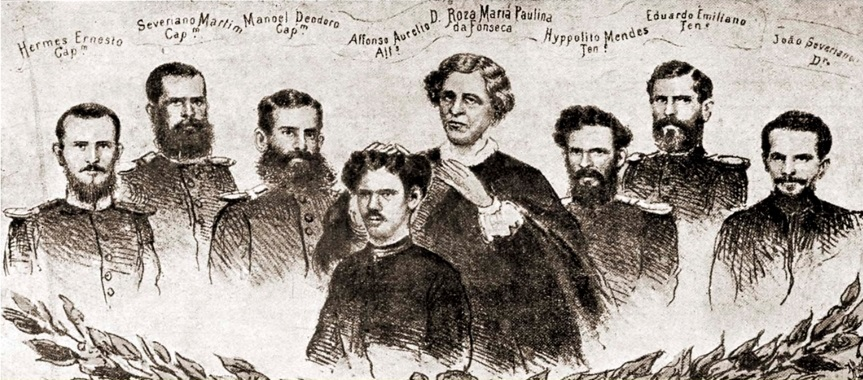
The matriarch Rosa da Fonseca and her seven sons, Semana Illustrada, 1865

Fonseca was born on 5 August 1827 in the city of Alagoas in the Empire of Brazil. He was the son of Lieutenant Colonel Manuel Mendes da Fonseca and his wife, Rosa Maria Paulina da Fonseca. Simmons notes that the origin of the Fonseca family could be traced back to Dutch Brazil.

Mendes Fonseca was a military officer in charge of the province of Alagoas in 1831. His career was turbulent, repeatedly resulting in him losing and regaining the trust of the government over the course of eight years. In 1839, he participated in a failed provincial revolt opposing the elevation of Maceió to the provincial capital of Alagoas. He was arrested on 20 December 1839 and was held in confinement at the Fortress of Villegaignon until 9 April 1840. Fortunately for him, the rebellion did not leave a high death toll, and politicians successfully lobbied for a more lenient sentencing. His trial was to be held in Rio de Janeiro but it was later determined that it would be held in Alagoas. There, he was acquitted and exonerated of all criminal records. He was elected to public office thereafter. His military career ended in 1846, and he retired to private life, dying in 1859.

Júnior believes that the 1839 revolt was a traumatizing event for young Deodoro, influencing his later indecision in the days leading up to the Proclamation of the Republic.

== Early military career, 1843–1858 ==
The Military School of Rio de Janeiro, 1856 drawing by Pieter Godfried Bertichen

In 1843, Deodoro entered the Military School of Rio de Janeiro when he was 16, following in the footsteps of his seven siblings who had distinguished themselves in military service. On 18 April 1845, he attained the status of first class cadet, and in 1847 he completed his military studies. In the subsequent years, he was posted to Pernambuco.

There, he participated in the quelling of the Praieira revolt (1848–1849) His unit, rather than launching an attack against the rebel forces, waited for the rebels to move south. Their predictions were proven correct when rebellion leader Pedro Ivo launched an attack down Recife from the north on 2 February 1849. He was eventually overwhelmed by imperial forces, and was forced to retreat further into the interior as his forces were continually pursued. Following this, Deodoro participated in two more battles against the rebels before the uprising was entirely crushed. His bravery was greatly commended by his senior commandants. Later that year he also led military forces which repressed an uprising in Rio Formoso. For all these actions he was promoted to a first lieutenant of artillery on 30 April 1852.

However, for various actions of insubordination, he was imprisoned several times between 1852 and 1853, which led to him being transferred to a unit in Rio de Janeiro in 1854. There, he served in the Fortaleza de Santa Cruz for several months. Later, he was designated as adjutant and secretary of the Engineer Battalion in 1855. On 2 December 1856, he was promoted to captain and posted to Sao Paulo where he served as a subordinate to the Minister of War. In 1858, he returned to Rio de Janeiro, and was given command of a batch of students in military school who were training to be part of the Engineer Battalion.

== Interlude, 1858–1864 ==
In 1860, Deodoro was transferred to Mato Grosso, where he served as the governor's (Antônio Pedro de Alencastro) aide-de-camp. When he arrived in Cuiabá, he met Mariana Cecília de Sousa Meireles, who became his wife. She was one year older than him at the time. Shortly after they met, the two married on 16 April.

In 1862, however, the couple separated as Deodoro had to return to Rio de Janeiro that year. After taking sick leave for a few months in early 1863 due to an enduring case of Bronchitis, Deodoro was appointed as instructor to the national guards of the Fortaleza de Santa Cruz. In 1864, he was assigned to an expeditionary force headed towards Río de la Plata, where Uruguayan local leaders had been causing disturbances on the border.

== Paraguayan War, 1864–1870 ==
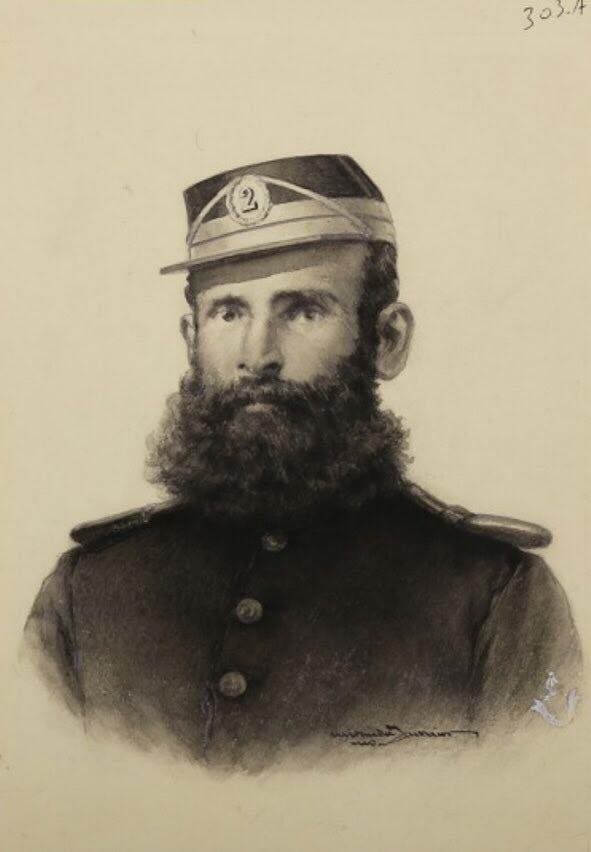
Fonseca as an officer in the Paraguayan War, c. 1870

In 1864, Brazilian troops militarily intervened in the Uruguayan political crisis. Paraguay's dictator, Fransisco Antonio Lopez, was alarmed by this as he perceived it as a sign that Brazil was aiming to resolve border problems through military force. Concerned that his country would be next, he declared war on Brazil.

== Later career, 1870–1889 ==
As governor of Rio Grande do Sul, Fonseca was courted by republican intellectuals such as Benjamin Constant and Ruy Barbosa in the café society of São Paulo. In 1886, alerted that the imperial government was ordering the arrest of prominent republicans, Fonseca went to Rio de Janeiro and assumed leadership of the army faction that supported the abolition of slavery in Brazil.

Emperor Pedro II had advocated the abolition of slavery for decades, freeing his own slaves in 1840, but he believed slavery should be done away with slowly to avoid damaging the Brazilian economy. The government, nominally headed by his daughter, Isabel, Princess Imperial of Brazil, abolished slavery entirely in 1888, during her third regency while her father was away from the country. Enraged oligarchs played a role in the subsequent coup d'état. Fonseca's prestige placed him at the head of the military coup that deposed the emperor on 15 November 1889, and he was briefly the head of the provisional government that called a Constituent Congress to draft a new constitution for a republic. Soon, however, he was in conflict with the civilian republican leaders. His election as president on 25 February 1891, by a narrow plurality, was backed with military pressure on Congress.

== Leader of the provisional government, 1889–1891 ==
=== Internal politics ===
The 1st Deodoro cabinet
| Office | Name | Term |
| Minister of War | Benjamin Constant | 1889 – 1890 |
| Floriano Peixoto | 1890 – 1891 |
| Navy | Eduardo Wandenkolk | 1889 – 1891 |
| Foreign Affairs | Quintino Bocaiuva | 1889 – 1891 |
| Domestic Affairs | Aristides Lobo | 1889 – 1890 |
| Cesário Alvim | 1890 – 1891 |
| Finance | Rui Barbosa | 1889 – 1891 |
| Agriculture | Demetrio Ribeiro | 1889 – 1890 |
| Francisco Glicério | 1890 – 1891 |
| Justice | Campos Sales | 1889 – 1891 |

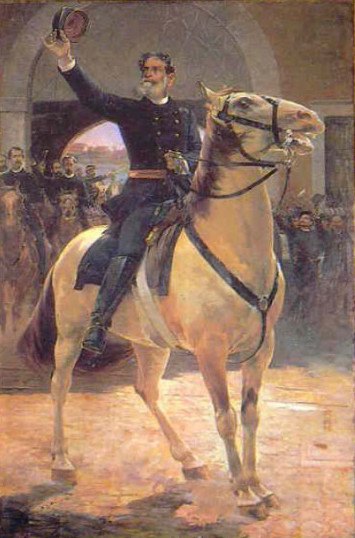
Portrait of General Deodoro da Fonseca (or Proclamation of the Brazilian Republic), 1892 painting by Henrique Bernardelli

From 1889 to 1891, Deodoro led a provisional government. His first cabinet was stuffed with high-ranking republican politicians, who had lofty aspirations but were inexperienced in official service. Some, like Rui Barbosa understood the theoretical workings of the republican system in the United States. Excluding Quintino Bocaiuva, nobody was acquainted with the practical workings of a republican system in the Americas.

Cognizant of the fact that he lacked administrative skill, Deodoro gave his ministers free rein over their respective ministries within the first month of the republic. This was taken further when a Council of Ministers was created by Deodoro and his contemporaries, which would take on an executive function for the following six months.

A sense of sceptical incertitude remained after the 15 November coup, caused by fears that a counter revolution would be launched. Deodoro's oldest brother, Hermes Ernesto da Fonseca was believed to be a potential future conspirator as he had protested against the coup and advised Pedro II to gather a resistance force.

On 17 November, the imperial senate was dissolved through military force, following an aborted meeting held on the previous day where they had discussed rumors of their imprisonment.

The governmental transition went smoothly within its first month. The proclamation of the republic was endorsed by the legislature while many provincial governors ceded control to republican forces. Though many of the empire's politicians were removed, a small number of them thrived under the new regime.

The government became alarmed at the possibility of monarchist conspiracies following a series of minor uprisings. In November, a revolt occurred in Desterro and another took place when sailors disembarked the cruiser Niterói and opened hostilities on land. On December 18, a revolt involving the raising of the imperial flag occurred in Rio de Janeiro, which was quickly repressed by military forces. In the aftermath, ten soldiers were nearly given the death penalty, though their sentence was later commuted to life imprisonment. Additionally, Pedro II had refused a donation of 5000 Reis granted to him by the government, which had been intended to help him acclimate to his new life in Europe. The administration was uneased by this, believing his action could stoke monarchist morale as they could perceive it as a signal that he was still in opposition to the republic. Distressed by these events, the government declared a state of siege in the country. Properties of the royal family were sold and personal enemies of Deodoro were exiled, while Monarchists were arrested on grounds of breeding unrest.

=== Altering of national symbols ===
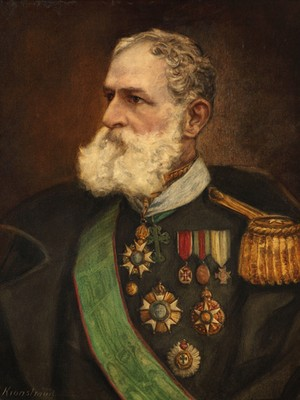
Marshal Fonseca wearing imperial orders and decorations as he appeared c. 1889, painting by Bror Kronstrand

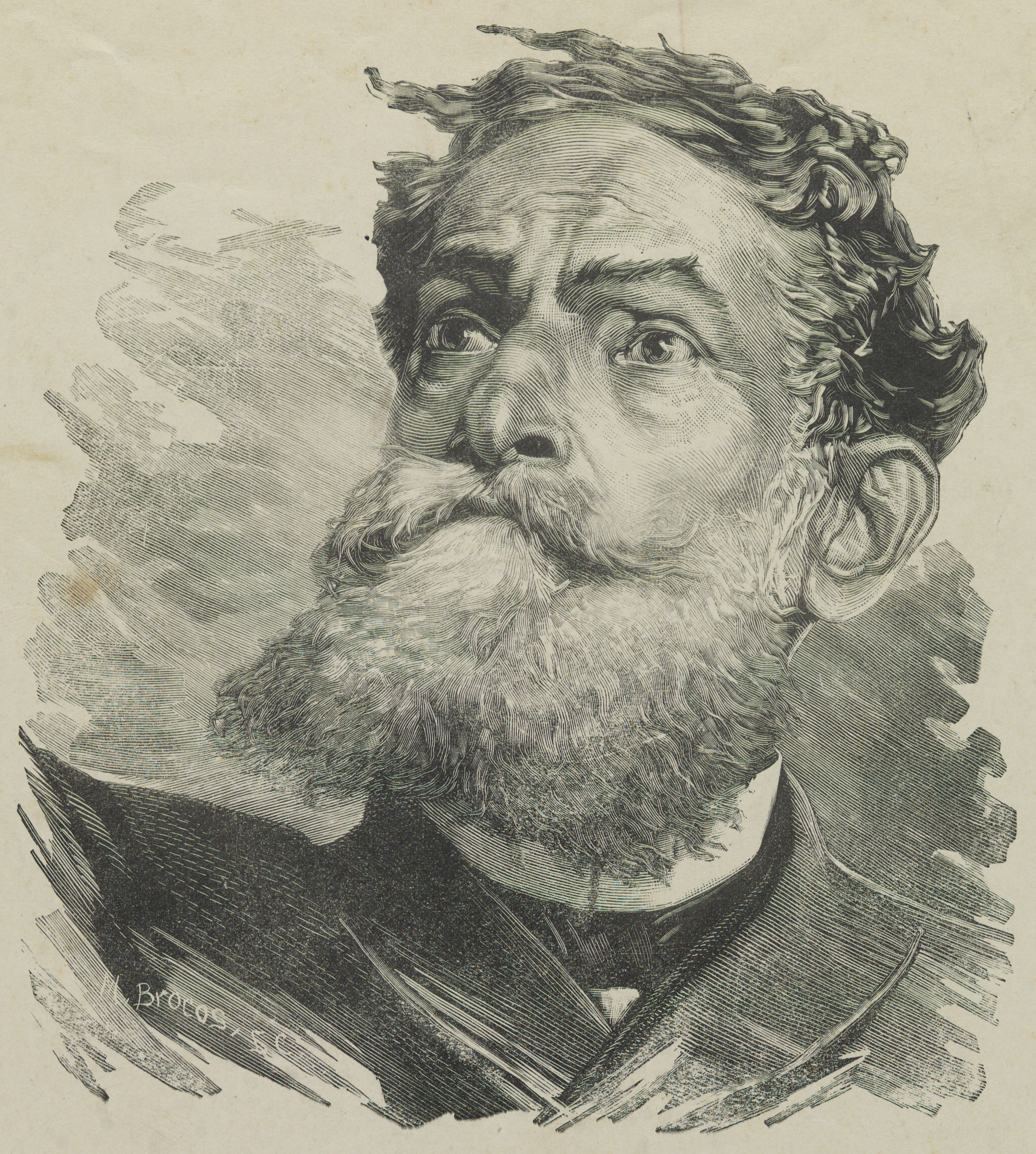
Marechal Deodoro da Fonseca engraved by Modesto Brocos (1890)

To signal the permanence of the new establishment, imperial symbols were hastily removed. Banknote images were changed from portraits of Pedro II and of monarchist symbols to those of the young republic. Newborns were named after the founders of the United States. The title of Rio de Janeiro was changed via decree from "The Court" to the "Federal Capital". The title "Pedro II" was banned from being used in any name of a property.

=== Actions of the government ===
The government passed many reforms through executive decree, which drew widespread criticism. The first decree, passed on 16 November established federalism as the mode of government. Following this, other decrees were passed which:

- Expanded the electorate to include all literate males
- Legalised civil marriage
- Separated church and state
- Gave greater power to the government in administrating states
- Dissolved provincial assemblies
- Made amendments to the civil code

The government promoted the assumption of administrative offices by military men through a decree given on 21 November, which allowed officers to remain on a status of continuous duty (and thus receive promotions) while occupying offices. Later decrees also allowed them to receive an office salary which was greatly increased over time.

Known as the "great naturalisation", on 14 December, all foreign nationals were decreed to be given Brazilian citizenship (unless they refused it).

On 31 December, Ruy Barbosa and Benjamin Constant were appointed as the nation's vice-chiefs.

=== Press censorship ===
On December 23, martial law was declared. On the same day, executive decrees were put into place which created a military tribunal to judge civilians accused of promoting subversive activities. The law informally illegalised any discussion of political affairs in the press. This was done in response to the 18 December revolt (though no monarchist conspiracy had been discovered).

Any newspaper deemed to be spreading "false news and alarming reports" would be ordered to cease its publications. The decision to stifle press freedom garnered Deodoro animosity from Brazil's literate population in light of how press freedom had been a regular civil liberty during the Empire. The Tribuna Liberal, the single opposition newspaper in Rio de Janeiro was forced to close down. Other periodicals continually pushed against these restrictions, leading to the arrests of their editors.

Deodoro believed that press criticism damaged the ability of his government to act unrestricted. The republican Governor of Maranhao, Pedro Tavares, was arrested after he chastised the government following a session of the Council of Ministers in which Deodoro admonished the Minister of War, Benjamin Constant, for insufficiently dealing with the press and proclaimed the army in an incompetent state. On 31 March 1890, a formal decree on press censorship was instituted by Campos Sales, named "the corking decree", which aimed to end the criticism the government had been receiving from the press. But denunciation of the administration continued.

=== Ministerial in-fighting ===
In early 1890, two ministers, Demetrio Ribeiro and Aristides Lobo resigned from Deodoro's ministry, both due to council infighting. The former resigned after Rui Barbosa, Deodoro's Minister of Finance attempted to force the passing of a bill by threatening his resignation if it failed to pass; while the latter followed suit following a disagreement with Deodoro over some suggested appointees to the cabinet. On February 8, Benjamin Constant proposed to the council that Deodoro assume dictatorial powers and that council members be reassigned as secretaries. His proposition was rebuked.

As the press continued to criticise Deodoro and his government, the former became increasingly vexed at his situation. He even offered to resign in a letter sent to Rui Barbosa on 6 May (though Barbosa was able to persuade him otherwise):

The high office with which I have been invested is impossible for me considering that I do not have the patience of Job, nor desire the martyrdom of Jesus Christ. I consider myself without sufficient stamina to continue in such an office. [...] I am returning to my quarters, where I will be found, when, in matters dealing with my profession, there is need of an old soldier.

Simmons believes that Deodoro perhaps reached a breaking point following a controversy in which his Foreign Affairs Minister, Bocaiuva, threatened to resign. This had came about when Deodoro attempted to crack down on robbery and brawlers, which had been prevalent social issues of the empire. Many of these people had connections with members of prominent military and political groups. The bandit Jose Elysio dos Reis, for example, was the son (Note: Simmons attests that Elysio was the brother of the Count, though other sources support Bello.) of Count Mattosinhos, proprietor of the newspaper Paiz. Bocaiuva served as the newspaper's editor, and on the count's request, gave a guarantee that Elysio would not be imprisoned. But Deodoro refused to bestow a special status on Elysio and imprisoned him. As such, Bocaiuva threatened to resign if he was not freed on 10 April, while Campos Sales threatened his resignation if so. Deodoro insisted that the latter continue to serve and that he would give a warning to Elysio's family, but remained firm on not awarding any privileges to the bandit.

Benjamin Constant was sacked as Minister of War (in favour of Floriano Peixoto) and transferred to the Ministry of Public Instructions, Mails, and Telegraph, created mainly as a way to remove Constant from his position. This was because of his disregard for instilling discipline in the army, a product of the military youth's sway on him. He also failed to exert control over the military. It was rumoured that his secretary, Lauro Sodré, was the de facto Minister of War, while Constant was minister in name only. This state of affairs had annoyed both Deodoro and Constant, leading to feelings of hatred between the both of them.

On 27 September 1890, a meeting was held in the Council of Ministers, wherein Deodoro's nomination for treasurer of Rio's de Janeiro's postal system went unaddressed by Benjamin Constant. Constant had assigned someone to the post already, and threatened to resign if he was removed. Constant then charged that Deodoro had made a squabble over the issue. Deodoro became furious and challenged Constant to a duel to resolve the dispute, nearly attacking him. Two ministers intervened and they were brought to separate rooms. Deodoro and Constant both had heart attacks, with the latter being said to have never healed from its consequences. In spite of immense attempts to repress the incident, the press caught wind of it and spread the story quickly, resulting in a dampening of national morale.

=== A Tribuna incident ===
Emboldened by the popularity of government-critical articles in foreign newspapers, the Tribuna Liberal reopened its publications as A Tribuna on 1 July 1890 as a transcription of the Revista de Portugal. (Note: Also referred to as La Tribuna.)

The Revista de Portugal contained scathing articles written by the monarchist Eduardo Prado, which were then transcribed in A Tribuna. A particular article of his, titled "Practices and Theories of the Republican Dictatorship of Brazil" asserted that:

Mr. Deodoro, a valiant military man, was nothing more than a battalion commander in Paraguay, and in that capacity, was wounded, as happened to hundreds of other officers. It was a third role. He never commanded Brazilian forces on the field of battle, never directed any combat.

The statement aroused the anger of nationalist sectors of the military, and on 28 November 1890, its headquarters were raided by a group of 40 soldiers. Several people were injured, including one who was killed after he could not flee the building in time. Subsequently, the republican ministry threatened resignation if the perpetrators were not apprehended and if promises of civil liberties were not more vigorously enforced, though they retained their positions after Deodoro threatened his resignation.

=== Establishment of the Constituent Assembly ===
Charged with the writing of a new constitution, a constituent assembly was elected on 15 September 1890. Its president was Prudente de Morais. The selection process was tightly controlled by the government, leading a quarter of the total nominees being government candidates. Though no other topics of discussion were permitted in the assembly, a lengthy campaign spearheaded by César Zama persuaded it to pass a motion indicting the perpetrators of the La Tribuna attack following its formation.

=== 1891 Constitution ===
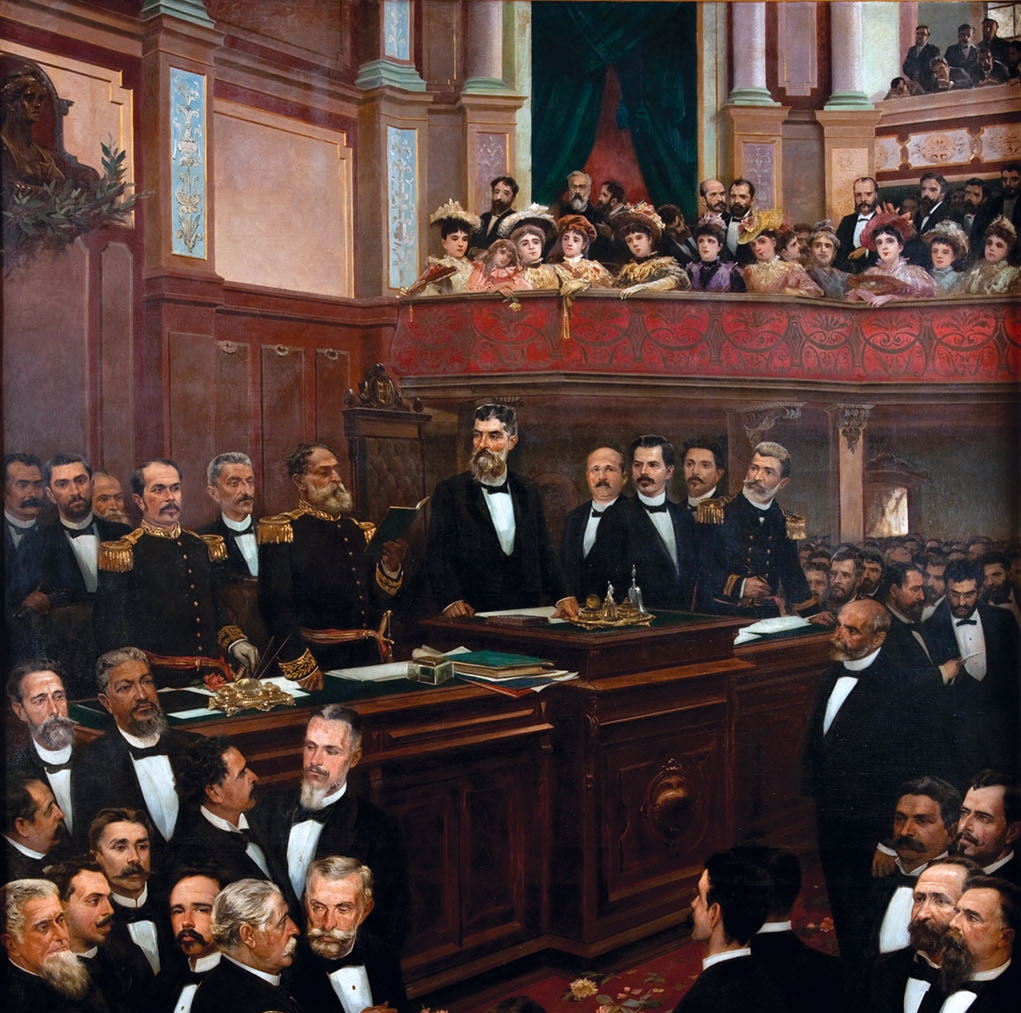
Aurélio de Figueiredo, Oath of the Constitution, c. 1891

On 3 December 1889, a committee consisting of 5 jurists was appointed to chart an early draft of the constitution. It sent out three drafts, which were eventually merged into one. Rui Barbosa, its editor, not only changed its style but changed some of its contents as well. Deodoro was initially dissatisfied with it, being opposed to the separation of the executive and legislative branches, the constriction of his power, and desiring the ability to dissolve congress as president.

On 24 February 1891, the constitution was completed. It was based on the Constitution of the United States and was heavily influenced by the Argentine Constitution as well as the Swiss constitution to a small extent. As such, it adopted ideas of political liberalism and federalism. The latter being agreed upon without much opposition from centralists. Like its predecessor, the 1824 Brazilian constitution, it was inspired by ideas of political and economical individualism.

The early draft aimed to keep a sense of nationalism that would still be in line with federalist ideas. However, a tide of ultra-federalism soon gained traction in the assembly that promoted ideas more extreme than those of the American and Argentine constitution. Though proponents mainly came from Rio Grande do Sul, they also came from other states. Suggestions made by this group of delegates included disallowing the organisation of a national army and allowing states to have their own navies. In response, Rui Barbosa organised a resistance. Ultimately, states were given the ability to create their own governmental organisations subject to the constitutional tenets of the country. They were also given the ability to enact wide-ranging taxes including export duties. The ambiguous wording of the constitution on this issue was the result of a compromise between the initial draft prepared by the committee (which favoured centralisation), and the one prepared by the constituent assembly (which favoured federalism). Worries and reluctance over constitutionalising federal intervention in states also culminated in an unclear phrasing which would spawn wide-ranging interpretations. Centralisation of all law, which had been proposed in a draft prepared by the committee, was struck off in the final constitution; adjective law (administration of law) was decentralised while substantive law (legal code) remained centralised.

The Positivist Apostolate, which had had little influence in the setting up of the provisional government, was more influential in the constituent assembly, especially to the delegates of Rio Grande do Sul. They advocated amendments in line with a republican, ultra-federalist dictatorship. Excluding an amendment on mortmain which prohibited the establishment of titles and decorations and an amendment which allowed states to create municipios, most of their proposals were refused.

The constituent assembly refused to reorganise federal territory (as proposed by the committee), causing some states to be more powerful than others as some had very little resources to maintain a degree of sovereignty from the federation.

In the final draft, the nation's governmental system was described as a federal republic. Its executives were to be a president and a vice-president who would be elected for four-year terms by the people by absolute majority vote. Cabinet members and secretaries were to be appointed by the president. The legislative department included a Senate and a House of Deputies. Three senators from each state were elected by the people to serve 9-year terms terms of nine years while deputies were elected to serve 3-year terms. State representation in the house of deputies was based on population of the states. In the judicial sphere a system of federal courts would be established. The Supreme Court was to have fifteen judges, and such subordinate courts were to be created by the legislature. Voting rights were extended to all literate males 21 and above. Freedom of religion and a bill of rights akin to that of the United States were also provided.

Though Bello states that the constitution had "intentional over-statements", he considered it "a victory for good sense and fairness". Nevertheless, he believed its ambiguities caused major issues in the First Brazilian Republic.

=== The Lucena cabinet ===
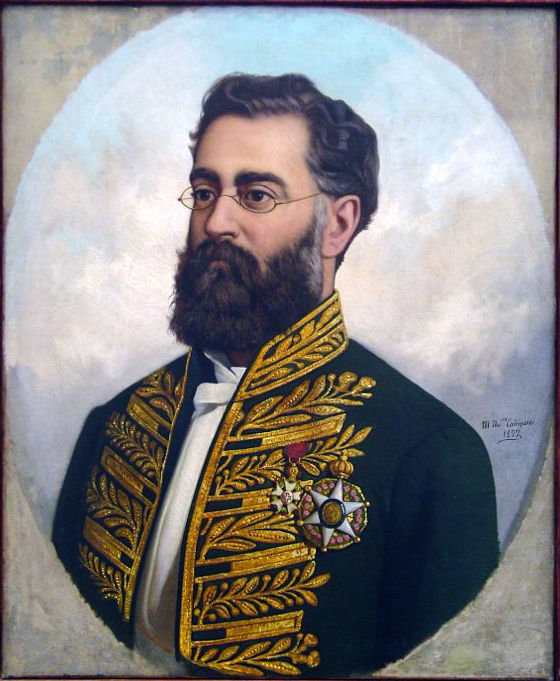
Henrique Pereira de Lucena, known as the Baron of Lucena. He was de facto head of Fonseca's second cabinet.

On 17 January 1891, the final meeting of the Council of Ministers was held, in which cabinet debated over Deodoro having granted rights to a personal friend for the construction of a port in Torres. This decision was opposed by the minister of the interior, Cesario Alvim; who believed the measure was ill-timed. Deodoro's cabinet agreed with Alvim, upsetting Deodoro as he believed they were being hypocritical as they frequently gave hundreds of contracts to personal friends. In response, Deodoro refused to approve any administrative acts until his was accepted.

With the constitution done and having gotten through its first reading, the ministry wrote a letter of resignation to on 20 January which was accepted by Deodoro the next day; he had initially called on his friend, the Baron of Lucena, to convince the cabinet to stay; but when Lucena travelled to Sao Cristóvão and found that the ministers had left, Deodoro decided to assemble a new ministry which was chaired by Lucena. Lucena exerted great influence over Deodoro, but was an incredibly unpopular figure among his supporters. His presence stoked further opposition to the Deodoro government. The cabinet members Lucena chose were mostly former monarchists from the North-east. The conservative nature of the new cabinet raised tensions between the government and the constituent assembly. Republicans disliked it as its members had no track record of commitment to republicanism and had no involvement in the Proclamation of the Republic. Demétrio Ribeiro led a movement in the assembly attacking the cabinet for its lack of experienced ministers.

The new ministry was submissive to Deodoro, being nicknamed the "ministry of courtiers". As a prerequisite for joining the ministry, all of its members were required to approve of Deodoro granting construction rights for the Torres port. Junior considered the ministry full of "weak-wills" while stating that Deodoro "needed people to advise him and [...] oppose his personal whims", something he "would not find" among the members of his ministry.

=== 1891 presidential election ===
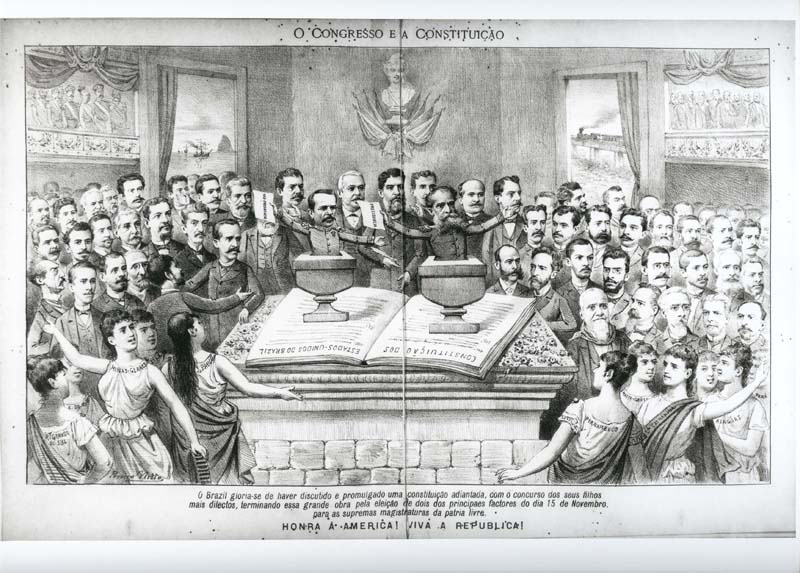
Allegorical political cartoon by Angelo Agostini on the 1891 presidential election

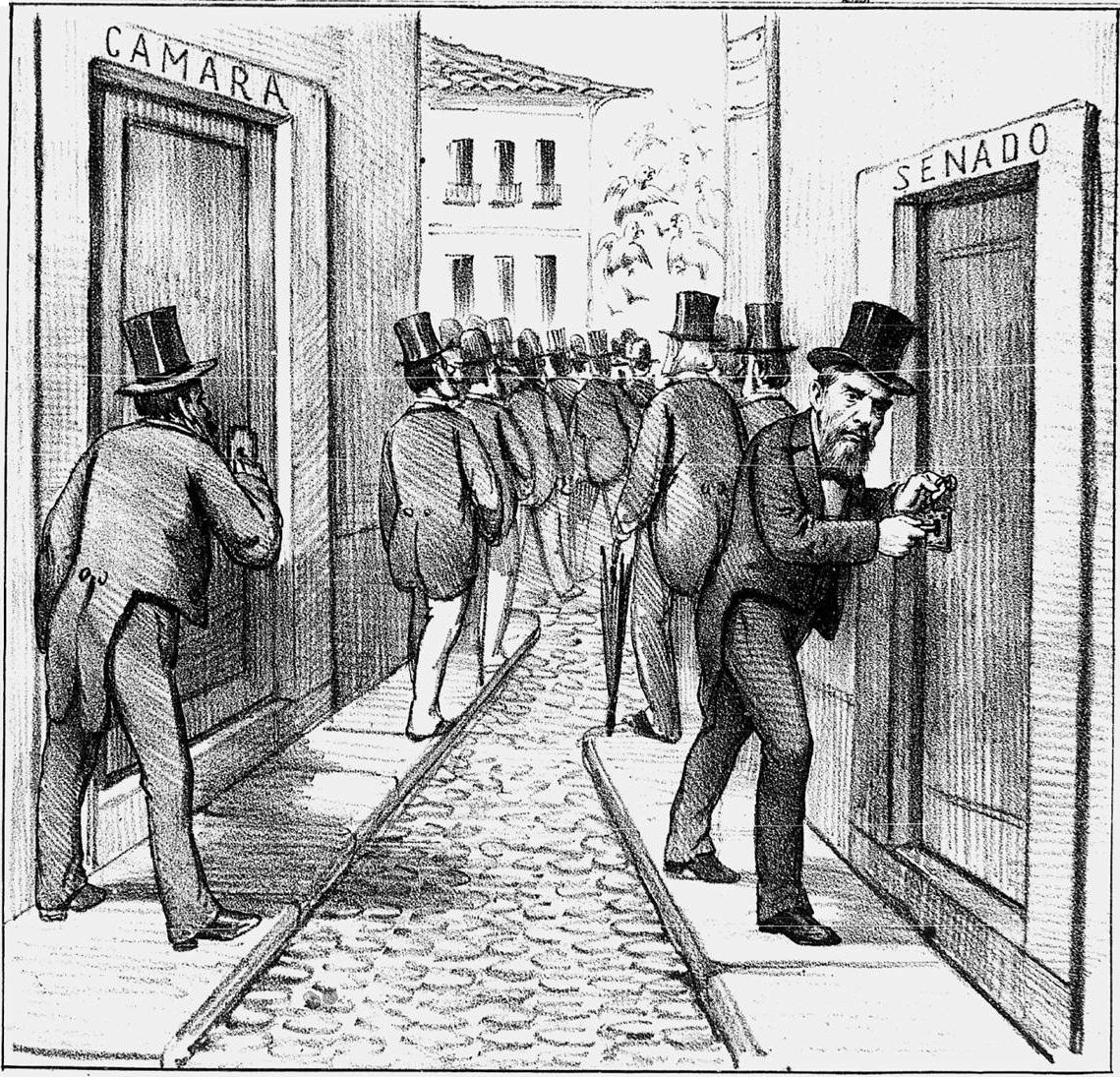
Fechamento do Congresso (the dissolution of Congress) by Angelo Agostini (1892)

The resignation of Deodoro's ministry re-invigorated the movement against Deodoro being elected president. A group of military delegates, in collaboration with civilian politicians, at first nominated Floriano Peixoto as a presidential candidate, believing he would counter Deodoro as a military man himself. Rumours were also circulating that Peixoto was unreservedly with the opposition despite his formal denials. But opinion polls indicated that only a small number of officers supported Peixoto and that the majority of the military liked Deodoro better.

The final suggestion for Deodoro's opposition was a nomination of Prudente de Morais as presidential candidate and Peixoto as a vice-presidential candidate, with Moraes' candidacy having been put forward by the expanding civilian faction in January and early February 1891. This faction was led by Demétrio Ribeiro, General José Simeão and Custódio de Melo. Melo was the leader of a group of naval officers envious of the spoils the army had gotten from the 15 November coup; parts of the navy were dissatisfied with the army-dominated administration.

Deodoro's supporters, which were naturally from the strong-government faction, chose Admiral Eduardo Wandenkolk as vice-presidential candidate, to procure support from the navy. Though Wandenkolk was initially able to get an endorsement of the Deodoro—Wandenkolk ticket from the Naval Club, this had been through a meeting in which a minority of its members had been present. The Naval Club rescinded the endorsement following another meeting.

Fearing a military reprisal were Morais to win, Campos Sales attempted to convince a group of his friends to make a public endorsement of Deodoro's candidacy. He argued that any major rupture would have severe repercussions for the republic. Glicério and others agreed with Sales and plans were made to nominate Morais for vice-president. But as Morais could not withdraw as presidential candidate by this time, the meeting resulted in no change.

On 24 February, the constitution of Brazil was officially promulgated. On the same day, the Constituent Assembly received information that if Deodoro was not elected, the military would force the assembly to dissolve. Deodoro was in favour of the plan. Various commanders of the Rio de Janeiro garrison moved into positions nearby the assembly. Deodoro's opposition, though fiercely determined, had little hope of organising a successful resistance without military support.

Campos Sales, Floriano Peixoto and José Simeao, and members of the opposition privately discussed arrangements for the defence of the assembly were troops to invade. Prudente did not attend, but delegated Manuel Luís da Rocha Osório as his stand-in. It was agreed that were Prudente to win, he would be sworn in as president immediately and his government established within the assembly building. Floriano, Morais, and Simeao, would gather troops loyal to them to guard the assembly, while Melo could activate the navy to guarantee Prudente's prompt inauguration. Months later, Floriano would claim in a meeting with Campos Sales that following an important meeting of military officers, the army had decided it could accept him as president if Deodoro were not elected.

Nevertheless, military pressure likely played a key role in Deodoro's electoral victory on 25 February. Deodoro received 129 votes against 97 for Morais. For the vice-presidency, Floriano was elected, with 153 votes against 32 for Wandenkolk. Some of Floriano's support had come from army elements who favoured him over a member of the navy.

=== Economy ===
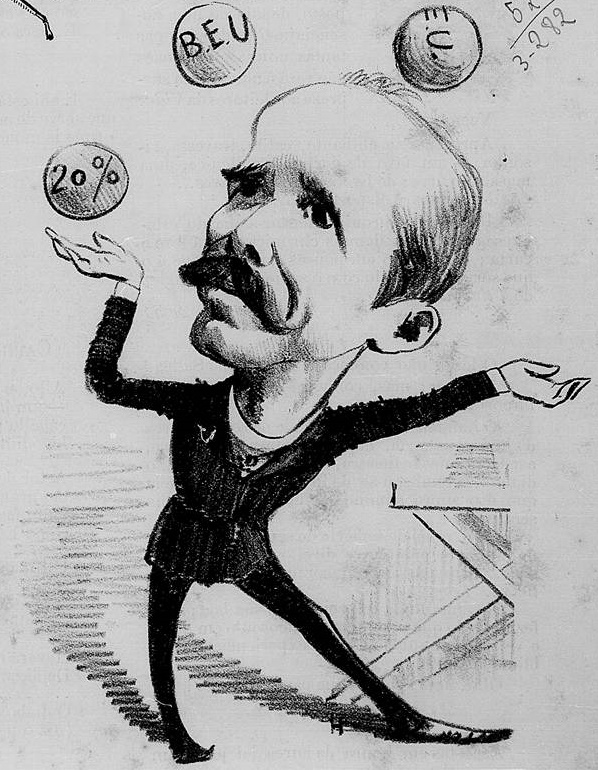
Satiric cartoon depicting Rui Barbosa, then Minister of Finance, attempting to balance Brazil's economy

Upon his appointment as finance minister, Rui Barbosa faced a challenging economic situation as the November 15 coup had shaken the confidence of foreign bankers and merchants. Until elections were held and a legitimate government came to power, the Rothchilds, Brazil's main financiers, refused to hand out loans. Foreign merchants and wealthy Brazilians sent large quantities money out of the country in fear of political and economic unrest.

On January 17, 1890, Rui Barbosa decreed a financial reform which allowed certain preferred banks lacking in assets to triple the value of their loans, along with allowing various business concerns to greatly increase their capitalisation. In addition, banks would pay their interest fees in yearly installments, with each year seeing a reduction in the interest rates. A ten percent tax on gross profits was also instituted. to subside the public debt. Other measures of the decree included the substitution of gold with government bonds as bank notes needed to be produced. This began an economic crisis referred to as the encilhamento.

With questionable companies being incorporated daily and assured interest payments by the government, speculation rose massively. The tide of inflation that had originated from the administration of the Viscount of Ouro Preto heightened. The crisis was further exacerbated by Rui Barbosa's successor, the magistrate Alencar Araripe, as he aimed to remold his predecessor's policies. He was easily controlled by market speculators and dubious figures who came mainly from urban areas. The country's currency exchange rate continuously dropped. Banks issued currency without printing paper bills; using the treasury's supply and placing their own imprints on them. The number of bankruptcies increased rapidly. Public trust was greatly shaken. This predicament did not improve when Lucena took over as finance minister. The government's unclear grasp of the situation could be seen in the main fiscal happenings of the Lucena cabinet's tenure, which were the merging of the Banco do Brasil and the Banco dos Estados Unidos do Brasil (both struggling); the re-organisation of the Banco do Republica with allowance to issue up to 600000 contos; and the failure of the General Railroad Company with liabilities exceeding 300000 contos.

== Presidency (1891) ==
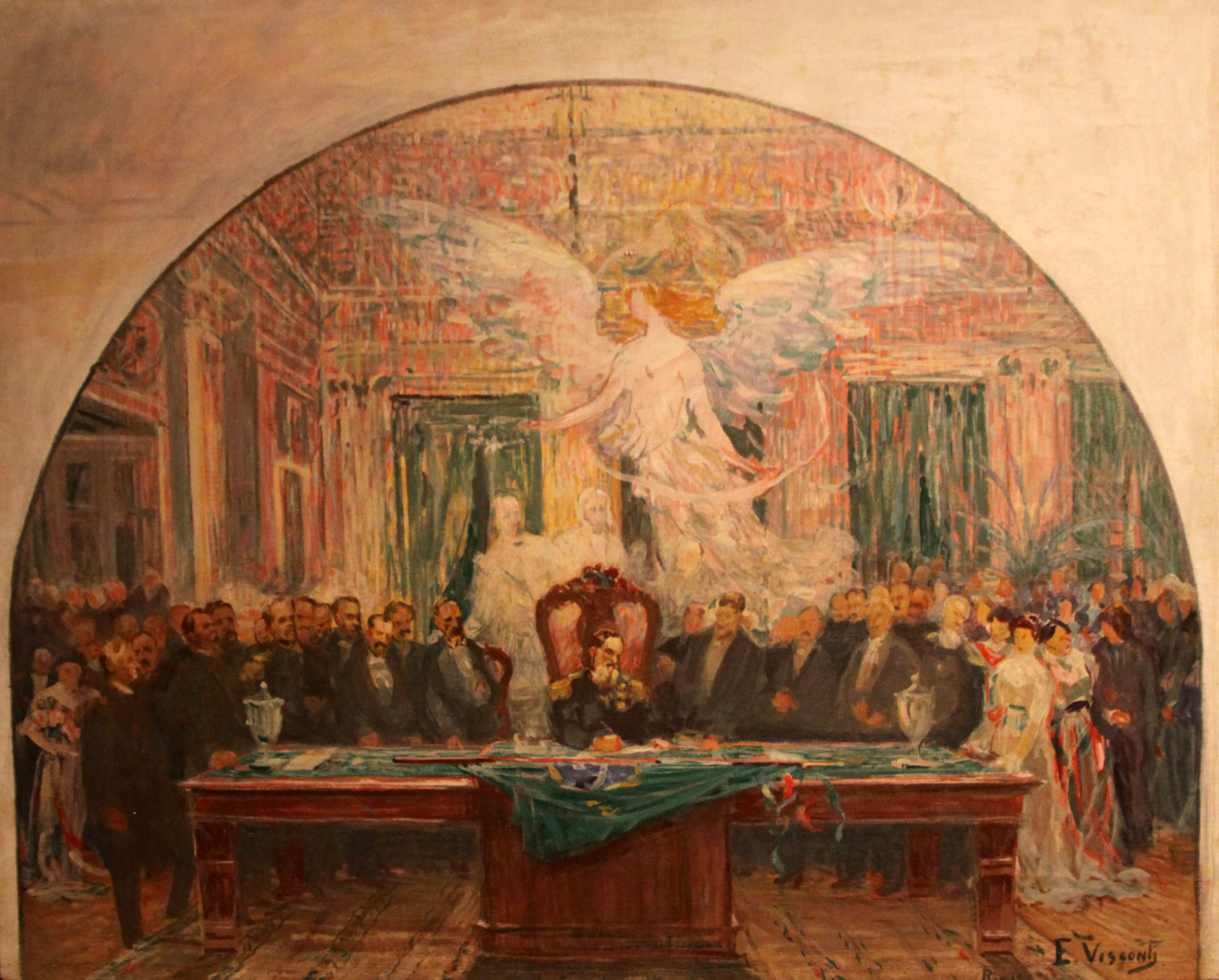
Inauguration of Deodoro da Fonseca, by Eliseu Visconti

The provisional government exercised dictatorial powers for a year, and on 25th February 1891 Fonseca was elected president of the republic. He was, however, no politician, and possessed indeed little ability beyond the art of acquiring popularity. His tenure of office was short. In May he became involved in an altercation with congress, and in November pronounced its dissolution, a measure beyond his constitutional power. After a few days of arbitrary rule insurrection broke out in Rio Grande do Sul, and before the close of November Fonseca, finding himself forsaken, resigned his office. From that time he lived in retirement.

== Death ==
Equestrian monument and tomb of Deodoro da Fonseca in Rio de Janeiro

He died in Rio de Janeiro on 23 August 1892. He was stricken with perilous bouts of dyspnea, popularly referred to as "shortness of breath", and was buried in a family grave in the Caju Cemetery. However, in 1937, his remains were unearthed and transferred to a monument in Praça Paris, Rio de Janeiro.

== In popular culture ==
Fonseca has been portrayed twice by Brazilian actor and voice actor Castro Gonzaga in the miniseries Abolição (1988) and República (1989) respectively.

== See also ==
- List of presidents of Brazil

== Bibliography ==
=== Biographies ===
- Amaral, Marcio Tavares de (2003) [1976]. Marechal Deodoro [Marshal Deodoro] (in Brazilian Portuguese). Editora Três.
- Fonseca, Walter (1982). Fonseca, uma família e uma história [Fonseca, a family and a history] (in Brazilian Portuguese). Editora Obelisco.
- Lemos, Renato. "FONSECA, Deodoro da" (PDF). FGV CPDOC. pp. 1–26. Archived from the original (PDF) on 6 December 2025.
- Simmons, Charles Willis (1966). Marshal Deodoro and the fall of Dom Pedro II. Durham, N.C.: Duke University Press. LCCN 66028493. OCLC 964150. OL 5996264M.
- Silva, Hélio (2004) [1983]. Deodoro, proclamação da República, 1889-1894 [Deodoro, Proclamation of the Republic, 1889–1894] (in Brazilian Portuguese) (2 ed.). Grupo de Comunicação Três.
- Júnior, Raimundo Magalhães (1957). Deodoro, a espada contra o Império [Deodoro, the sword against the Empire] (in Brazilian Portuguese). Vol. 1. Companhia Editora Nacional.
- Júnior, Raimundo Magalhães (1957). Deodoro, a espada contra o Império [Deodoro, the sword against the Empire] (in Brazilian Portuguese). Vol. 2. Companhia Editora Nacional.

=== General histories ===
- Bello, José Maria (1964) [1959]. A History of Modern Brazil (4 ed.).
- Carone, Edgard (1983) [1975]. A República Velha: II, Evolução política, 1889-1930 [The Old Republic: II, Political Evolution, 1889–1930] (in Brazilian Portuguese) (4 ed.). Difusão Editorial SA.
- Hill, Lawrence (1947). Brazil. University of California Press.
- Schwarcz, Lilia Moritz; Starling, Heloisa M. (2017). Brazil: A Biography. Penguin Books, Limited. ISBN 978-1-84614-793-7.

=== Presidential studies ===
- Guimarães, Bruna Viera (2007). Deodoro da Fonseca – A propaganda política do primeiro presidente do Brasil [Deodoro da Fonseca – The political propaganda of Brazil's first president] (Thesis). Universidade Metodista de São Paulo.
- Hayes, Robert A. (1977). "The Tragedy of Marshal Deodoro da Fonseca: A Military Class Perspective". Luso-Brazilian Review. 14 (2). University of Wisconsin Press: 211–224. ISSN 0024-7413.

=== Specialised studies ===
- Hahner, June Edith (1966). Civilian-military relations in Brazil, 1889-1898. Cornell University.
- Ribeiro, Filipe Nicoletti (2021). "The rule of force: militarism and the militarization of politics in the early Brazilian Republic (1889-1890)". BRASILIANA: Journal for Brazilian Studies. 10 (2): 158–181. ISSN 2245-4373.
- Schulz, John (2008). The financial crisis of abolition. New Haven: Yale University Press. ISBN 978-0-300-13419-3.

Political offices
| Preceded by Baron of Lucena | President of the Rio Grande do Sul Province; 1886 | Succeeded by Miguel Calmon du Pin |
| New office | President of Brazil; 1889–1891 | Succeeded by Floriano Peixoto |
Civic offices
| New office | President of the Military Club; 1887–1889 | Succeeded by Benjamin Constant |
Honorary titles
| Preceded by Pedro II of Brazil | President of the Supreme Military and Justice Council; 1889–1891 | Succeeded by Floriano Peixoto |
