= List of governors of Bahia =

Flag of Bahia

Below is a list of governors of the Brazilian state of Bahia.

Order	Name	Term begins	Terms ends	Comments and observations
52rd	Jerônimo Rodrigues	January 1, 2023		
51st	Rui Costa	January 1, 2015	December 31, 2022	
50th	Jaques Wagner	January 1, 2007	January 1, 2015	
49th	Paulo Souto	January 1, 2003	January 1, 2007	
48th	Otto Alencar	April 5, 2002	January 1, 2003	
47th	César Borges	January 1, 1999	April 5, 2002	(Resigned)
46th	Paulo Souto	January 1, 1995	January 1, 1999	
45th	Antônio Imbassahy	1994	1995	President of the Assembly
44th	Ruy Trindade	1994	1994	President of the Court of Justice
43rd	Antônio Carlos Magalhães	1991	1994	
42nd	Nilo Moraes Coelho	1989	1991	Lieutenant governor
41st	Waldir Pires	1987	1989	Resigned
40th	João Durval Carneiro	1983	1987	
39th	Antônio Carlos Magalhães	1979	1983	
38th	Roberto Santos	1975	1979	
37th	Antônio Carlos Magalhães	1971	1975	
36th	Luís Viana Filho	1967	1971	
35th	Lomanto Júnior	1963	1967	
34th	Juracy Magalhães	1959	1963	
33rd	Antônio Balbino	1955	1959	
32nd	Régis Pacheco	1951	1955	João de Lima Teixeira / Augusto Públio Pereira*
31st	Otávio Mangabeira	1947	1951	
30th	Cândido Caldas	1946	1947	
29th	Guilherme Carneiro da Rocha Marback	1946	1946	
28th	João Vicente Bulcão Viana	1945	1946	
27th	Renato Onofre Pinto Aleixo	1942	1945	Interim governor
26th	Landulfo Alves	1938	1942	Interim governor
25th	Antônio Fernandes Dantas	1937	1938	Interim governor
24th	Juracy Magalhães	1931	1937	Interim governor
23rd	Raimundo Rodrigues Barbosa	1931	1931	Interim governor
22nd	Artur Neiva	1931	1931	Interim governor
21st	Leopoldo Afrânio Bastos do Amaral	1930	1931	
20th	Frederico Augusto Rodrigues da Costa	1930	1930	Wencesláo Guimarães / Custódio Reis Príncipe Júnior*
19th	Vital Soares	1928	1930	
18th	Góis Calmon	1924	1928	
17th	José Joaquim Seabra	1920	1924	
16th	Antônio Ferrão Muniz de Aragão	1916	1920	
15th	José Joaquim Seabra	1912	1916	
14th	Bráulio Xavier	1912	1912	President of the Court of Justice
13th	Aurélio Rodrigues Viana	1911	1912	
12th	João Ferreira de Araújo Pinho	1908	1911	
11th	José Marcelino de Sousa	1904	1908	José Cupertino de Lacerda*
10th	Severino Vieira	1900	1904	
9th	Luís Viana	1896	1900	
8th	Rodrigues Lima	1892	1896	1st governor elected
7th	Leal Ferreira	1891	1892	
6th	Tude Soares Neiva	1891	1891	Interim
5th	José Gonçalves da Silva	1890	1891	Deposed
4th	Virgílio Clímaco Damásio	1890	1890	Lieutenant governor
3rd	Hermes Ernesto da Fonseca	1890	1890	
2nd	Manuel Vitorino Pereira	1889	1890	
1st	Virgílio Clímaco Damásio	1889	1889	Temporary

(*)Signifiies substitutes that legally occupied the office of governor.

== See also ==
- List of mayors of Salvador, Bahia
