= 1920 in Brazil =

Events in the year 1920 in Brazil.

== Incumbents ==
=== Federal government ===
- President: Epitácio Pessoa
- Vice President: Delfim Moreira (until 1 July); vacant (1 July to 10 November); Francisco Álvaro Bueno de Paiva (from 10 November)

=== Governors ===
- Alagoas: José Fernandes de Barros Lima
- Amazonas: Pedro de Alcântara Bacelar
- Bahia: Antônio Ferrão Muniz de Aragão, then José Joaquim Seabra
- Ceará:
  - till 12 July: João Tomé de Sabóia e Silva
  - from 12 12 July: Justiniano de Serpa
- Goiás: João Alves de Castro
- Maranhão: Urbano Santos
- Mato Grosso: Francisco de Aquino Correia
- Minas Gerais: Artur Bernardes
- Pará: Lauro Sodré
- Paraíba:
  - till 22 October: Francisco Camilo de Holanda
  - from 22 October: Sólon Barbosa de Lucena
- Paraná:
  - Afonso Camargo
  - Caetano Munhoz da Rocha
- Pernambuco:
  - till 28 October: José Rufino Bezerra Cavalcanti
  - from 28 October: Otávio Hamilton Tavares Barreto
- Piauí:
  - till 1 July: Eurípedes Clementino de Aguiar
  - from 1 July: João Luís Ferreira
- Rio Grande do Norte: Joaquim Ferreira Chaves
- Rio Grande do Sul: Antônio Augusto Borges de Medeiros
- Santa Catarina:
- São Paulo:
- Sergipe:

=== Vice governors ===
- Rio Grande do Norte:
- São Paulo:

== Events ==
- 20 April - Opening ceremony of the 1920 Summer Olympics in Antwerp, at which Brazil competes for the first time. Sport shooter Guilherme Paraense is the first Brazilian to win a gold medal.

== Arts and culture ==
=== Books ===
- Monteiro Lobato writes the first of his Sítio do Picapau Amarelo novel series.

=== Films ===
- Coração de Gaúcho, directed by and starring Luiz de Barros
- O Crime de Cravinhos, directed by Arturo Carrari and starring Rodolfo Arena.
- O Garimpeiro, directed by and starring Vittorio Capellaro

== Births ==
- 9 January - João Cabral de Melo Neto, poet and diplomat (died 1999)
- 21 April - Anselmo Duarte, actor, screenwriter and film director (died 2009)
- 26 July - Celso Furtado (died 2004)

== Deaths ==
- 26 March - Prince Luís, claimant to the Brazilian throne (born 1878; rheumatism)
- 1 July - Delfim Moreira, politician (born 1868)
- 16 October - Alberto Nepomuceno, conductor and composer (born 1864)

== See also ==
- 1920 in Brazilian football
