= 1927 in Brazil =

Events in the year 1927 in Brazil.

== Incumbents ==
=== Federal government ===
- President: Washington Luís
- Vice President: Fernando de Melo Viana

=== Governors ===
- Alagoas: Pedro da Costa Rego
- Amazonas: Ifigênio Ferreira de Sales
- Bahia: Góis Calmon
- Ceará: José Moreira da Rocha
- Goiás: Brasil Caiado
- Maranhão: José Magalhães de Almeida
- Mato Grosso: Mário Correia da Costa
- Minas Gerais: Antônio Carlos Ribeiro de Andrada
- Pará: Dionísio Bentes
- Paraíba: João Suassuna
- Paraná: Caetano Munhoz da Rocha
- Pernambuco: Estácio Coimbra
- Piauí: Matias Olímpio de Melo
- Rio Grande do Norte: José Augusto Bezerra de Medeiros
- Rio Grande do Sul: Antônio Augusto Borges de Medeiros
- Santa Catarina:
- São Paulo:
- Sergipe:

=== Vice governors ===
- Rio Grande do Norte:
- São Paulo:

== Events ==
- 11 June - The Brazilian submarine Humaytá is launched at the Odero-Terni-Orlando shipyard at La Spezia, Italy.
- date unknown - The Brazilian Chess Championship is held for the first time, in Rio de Janeiro.
- 25 October - Rio Grande do Norte becomes the first Brazilian state to legalize female suffrage.

== Arts and culture ==
=== Books ===
- Oswald de Andrade - Estrela de absinto

=== Films ===
- Rien que les heures, directed by Alberto Cavalcanti on location in France

== Births ==
=== March ===
- 3 March - Teixeirinha, musician (died 1985)
- 23 March - Osvaldo Lacerda, composer (died 2011)

=== June ===
- 5 June — Ladjane Bandeira, journalist and artist (died 1999)
- 16 June - Ariano Suassuna, playwright, author (died 2014)

=== August ===
- 13 August - Péricles Azambuja, historian, writer and journalist (died 2012)

=== September ===
- 4 September - Antônio Carlos Magalhães, diplomat and politician (died 2007)
- 13 September - Laura Cardoso, Brazilian actress
- 29 September -
  - Cid Moreira, Brazilian journalist and TV presenter
  - Adhemar da Silva, athlete (died 2001)

=== November ===
- 14 November - Fernando Torres, actor (died 2008)

== Deaths ==
- February - Paulo do Rio Branco, French-born rugby player, son of José Paranhos, Baron of Rio Branco (born 1876)
- 27 April - Carlos de Campos, politician and incumbent president of the state of São Paulo (born 1866)
- 12 July - José Augusto do Amaral, Brazilian serial killer (born 1871)

== See also ==
- 1927 in Brazilian football
