= 1915 in Brazil =

Events in the year 1915 in Brazil.

== Incumbents ==
=== Federal government ===
- President: Venceslau Brás
- Vice President: Urbano Santos da Costa Araújo

=== Governors ===
- Alagoas: Clodoaldo da Fonseca (until 12 June); João Batista Accioli Jr. (from 12 June)
- Amazonas: Jônatas de Freitas Pedrosa
- Bahia: José Joaquim Seabra
- Ceará: Benjamin Liberato Barroso
- Goiás: Joaquim Augusto da Costa Marques, then Caetano Manuel de Faria e Albuquerque
  - until June 30: Salatiel Simões de Lima
  - from June 30: Joaquim Rufino Ramos Jubé
- Maranhão: Herculano Nina Parga
- Mato Grosso:
- Minas Gerais: Delfim Moreira
- Pará: Enéas Martins
- Paraíba:
  - until 24 July: João Castro Pinto
  - from 24 July: Antônio da Silva Pessoa
- Paraná: Carlos Cavalcanti de Albuquerque
- Pernambuco:
  - until 18 December: Emídio Dantas Barreto
  - from 18 December: Manuel Antônio Pereira Borba
- Piauí: Miguel de Paiva Rosa
- Rio Grande do Norte: Joaquim Ferreira Chaves
- Rio Grande do Sul: Antônio Augusto Borges de Medeiros
- Santa Catarina:
- São Paulo:
- Sergipe:

=== Vice governors ===
- Rio Grande do Norte:
- São Paulo:

== Events ==
- 6 August - Brazilian-born Bernardino Luís Machado Guimarães becomes President of Portugal.

== Culture and the arts ==
- 29 January - Heitor Villa-Lobos gives the first in a series of chamber concerts; one of the new works he introduces during this year is his Cello Concerto no 1.

== Births ==
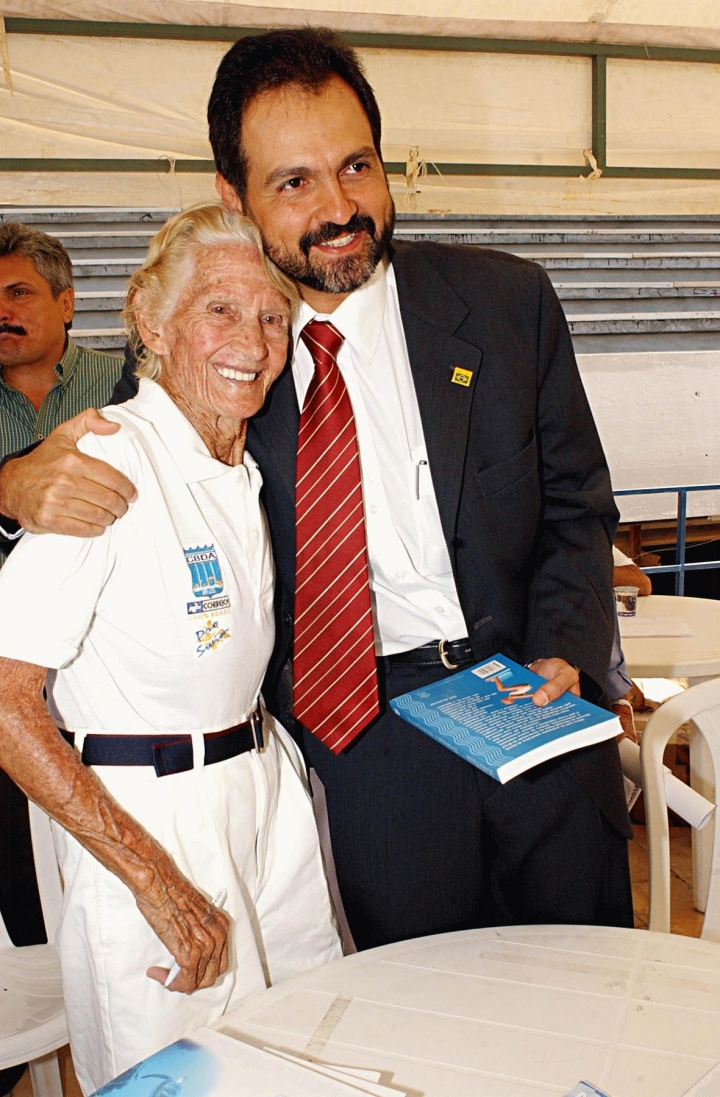
Maria Lenk (born 1915) with then-Brazilian Minister of Sports Agnelo Queiroz

- 5 January - Humberto Teixeira, musician (died 1979)
- 15 January - Maria Lenk, swimmer (died 2007)
- 20 April - Aurora Miranda, entertainer (died 2005)
- 18 July - Carequinha, clown and actor (died 2006)
- 18 October - Grande Otelo, Afro-Brazilian scholar, artist, and politician, real name Bernardes de Souza Prata (died 1993)

== Deaths ==
- 18 January - Bernardino José de Campos Júnior, politician, second and sixth governor of the State of São Paulo (born 1841)
- 2 February - João Cardoso de Meneses e Sousa, Baron of Paranapiacaba, poet, translator, journalist, lawyer and politician (born 1827)
- 27 November - Orville Adalbert Derby, American geologist who became a Brazilian citizen (born 1851; suicide)

== See also ==
- 1915 in Brazilian football
