= 1901 in Brazil =

Events in the year 1901 in Brazil.

== Incumbents ==
=== Federal government ===
- President: Manuel Ferraz de Campos Sales
- Vice President: Francisco de Assis Rosa e Silva

=== Governors ===
- Alagoas: Euclides Vieira Malta
- Amazonas: Silvério José Néri
- Bahia: Severino Vieira
- Ceará: Pedro Augusto Borges
- Goiás:
  - until June 10: Urbano Coelho de Gouveia
  - June 10 - August 12: Bernardo Albernaz
  - from August 12: José Xavier de Almeida
- Maranhão: João Gualberto Torreão da Costa
- Mato Grosso: Antônio Pedro Alves de Barros
- Minas Gerais: Silviano Brandão
- Pará:
  - until February 1: Pais de Carvalho
  - from February 1: Augusto Montenegro
- Paraíba: José Peregrino de Araújo
- Paraná: Francisco Xavier da Silva
- Pernambuco: Antônio Gonçalves Ferreira
- Piauí: Arlindo Francisco Nogueira
- Rio Grande do Norte: Alberto Maranhão
- Rio Grande do Sul: Antônio Augusto Borges de Medeiros
- Santa Catarina:
- São Paulo:
- Sergipe:

=== Vice governors ===
- Rio Grande do Norte:
- São Paulo:

== Events ==
- 23 February - The Instituto Butantan is launched by biomedical scientist Vital Brazil.
- 24 February - The Expointer agricultural show is launched in Porto Alegre.
- 5 June - The Correio da Manhã newspaper is published for the first time.
- 19 October - Aviator Alberto Santos-Dumont wins the Deutsch de la Meurthe prize with a flight that rounds the Eiffel Tower,

== Births ==
- 22 April - Adhemar de Barros, politician (died 1969)
- 25 May - Antônio Castilho de Alcântara Machado, journalist, politician and writer (died 1935)
- 11 June - José Maria Alkmin, politician (died 1974)
- August 1 - Pedro Aleixo, Vice President 1967–1969, de jure President Aug-Oct 1969 (died 1975)
- 9 September - Agostinho Fortes Filho, footballer (died 1966)

== Deaths ==
- 13 March - Princess Januária of Brazil (born 1822)
- 15 December - Elias Álvares Lobo, composer (born 1834)
