= 1889 in Brazil =

Events in the year 1889 in Brazil.

== Incumbents ==
=== Federal Government ===
- Monarch: Pedro II (until 15 November)
- President: Marshal Deodoro da Fonseca (de facto, from 15 November)
- Vice-President: none
- Prime Minister:
  - João Alfredo Correia de Oliveira (until 7 June)
  - Afonso Celso, Viscount of Ouro Preto (from 7 June to 15 November)
  - none (from 15 November)

=== Governors ===
- Alagoas: Government Junta (18 November-21), Tiburcio Valerio de Araujo (21 November-2 December), Pedro Paulino da Fonseca (starting 2 December)
- Amazonas: Government Junta (starting 21 November)
- Bahia: Virginio Climaco Damasio then Manuel Vitorino Pereira
- Ceará: Luis Antonio Ferraz (starting 16 November)
- Goiás: Government Junta (starting 7 December)
- Maranhão:
- Mato Grosso: Antonio Maria Coelho
- Minas Gerais: Antonio Olinto dos Santos Pires
- Pará: Justo Chermont (starting 17 December)
- Paraíba: Venancio Neiva (starting 17 November)
- Paraná: Francisco José Cardoso Júnior then José Marques Guimarães
- Pernambuco: José Cerqueira de Aguiar Lima (16 November-12 December), José Simeão de Oliveira (starting 12 December)
- Piauí: Gregório Taumaturgo de Azevedo (starting 26 December)
- Rio Grande do Norte: Pedro de Albuquerque Maranhão (17 November-6 December), Adolfo Afonso da Silva Gordo (starting 6 December)
- Rio Grande do Sul: Government Junta (starting 17 November)
- Santa Catarina: Lauro Müller (starting 2 December)
- São Paulo: Government Junta (starting 14 December)
- Sergipe: Junta Governativa Sergipana (starting 14 November), Felisbelo Firmo de Oliveira Freire (starting 2 December)

=== Vice governors ===
- Rio Grande do Norte: No vice governor
- São Paulo: No vice governor

== Events ==
=== May ===
- 3 May – The Cabinet of João Alfredo Correia de Oliveira loses a vote of no confidence.

=== June ===
- 7 June – Afonso Celso de Assis Figuereido, Viscount of Ouro Preto, is appointed to replace Correia de Oliveira as prime minister.

=== July ===
- July – Emperor Dom Pedro II travels to Minas Gerais, demonstrating both that he is still actively engaged in government and the depth of support for the monarchy in the province.

=== November ===
- 11 November – Republicans meet at the home of Rui Barbosa to plan a coup. The chief organizers are Benjamin Constant, Marshal Deodoro da Fonseca, Quintino Bocaiuva and Aristides Lobo.
- 15 November – A coup d'état institutes the First Brazilian Republic.
- 17 November – Emperor Dom Pedro II and his family are sent into exile in Europe.
- 19 November – A new national flag, devised by Raimundo Teixeira Mendes, is adopted by the republic.
- 20 November – Argentina becomes the first nation to recognize the new government of Deodoro da Fonseca.

=== December ===
- 24 December – The former royal family receive official notice that they will never be allowed to return to Brazil.

== Arts and culture ==
=== Books ===
- Osório Duque-Estrada – A Aristocracia do Espírito

== Births ==
- 2 December – Anita Malfatti, artist (d. 1964)
- unknown date – José Maria de Santo Agostinho, mystic (d. 1912)

== Deaths ==
- 29 March – Teófilo Dias, poet, journalist and lawyer (b. 1854)
- 26 June – Tobias Barreto, poet, philosopher, jurist and critic (b. 1839)
- 28 June – Francisco Otaviano, poet, lawyer, diplomat, journalist and politician (b. 1825)
- 21 October – Irineu Evangelista de Sousa, Viscount of Mauá, entrepreneur, industrialist, banker and politician (b. 1813)
- 28 December – Empress Teresa Cristina, wife of Emperor Dom Pedro II (b. 1822)
