= 1921 in Brazil =

Events in the year 1921 in Brazil.

== Incumbents ==
=== Federal government ===
- President: Epitácio Pessoa
- Vice President: Francisco Álvaro Bueno de Paiva

=== Governors ===
- Alagoas:
  - till 1 March: José Fernandes de Barros Lima
  - 1 March-12 June: Manuel Capitolino da Rocha Carvalho
  - from 12 June: José Fernandes de Barros Lima
- Amazonas: César do Rego Monteiro
- Bahia: José Joaquim Seabra
- Ceará: Justiniano de Serpa
- Goiás:
  - till 14 July: João Alves de Castro
  - from 14 July: Eugênio Rodrigues Jardim
- Maranhão: Urbano Santos
- Mato Grosso: Francisco de Aquino Correia
- Minas Gerais: Artur Bernardes
- Pará:
  - till 1 February: Lauro Sodré
  - from 1 February Antônio Emiliano de Sousa
- Paraíba: Sólon Barbosa de Lucena
- Paraná: Caetano Munhoz da Rocha
- Pernambuco:
  - till 3 June: Otávio Hamilton Tavares Barreto
  - from 3 June: Severino Marques de Queirós Pinheiro
- Piauí: João Luís Ferreira
- Rio Grande do Norte: Antonio José de Melo e Sousa
- Rio Grande do Sul: Antônio Augusto Borges de Medeiros
- Santa Catarina:
- São Paulo:
- Sergipe:

=== Vice governors ===
- Rio Grande do Norte:
- São Paulo:

== Events ==
- 2 January – The Association football club Cruzeiro Esporte Clube, from Belo Horizonte, is founded as the multi-sports club Palestra Italia by Italian expatriates in Brazil.
- February – Antoun Saadeh arrives in Brazil with his father, a prominent Arabic-language journalist.
- 22 May – The Estádio Antônio R. Guimarães is opened at Santa Bárbara d'Oeste.
- October - The government implements a new policy in defense of coffee, for the third time in the history of the Republic.
- date unknown – The Correio da Manhã publishes letters supposedly sent by Artur Bernardes and Raul Soares de Moura, containing insults towards the Armed Forces and Marshal Hermes da Fonseca.

== Arts and culture ==
=== Films ===
- Um Crime no Parque Paulista, directed by Arturo Carrari and starring Nicola Tartaglione
- Carlitinhos and Perversidade, short films directed by José Medina

== Births ==
- 13 April – Dona Ivone Lara, singer (died 2018)
- 12 May – Ruth de Souza, actress (died 2019)
- 5 June – Zuzu Angel, fashion designer and political campaigner (died 1976)
- 19 September – Paulo Freire, philosopher (died 1997)
- 26 September - Carlos Zéfiro, artist (died 1992)

== Deaths ==
- 28 January – Luis Soares Horta Barbosa, Deputy Grand Master of Brazil's Freemasons.
- 26 March – Leonel Martiniano de Alencar, Baron of Alencar, lawyer and diplomat (born 1832)
- 14 November – Isabel, Princess Imperial of Brazil, nicknamed "the Redemptress", heiress presumptive to the throne of the Empire of Brazil (born 1846)

== See also ==
- 1921 in Brazilian football
