= 1914 in Brazil =

Events in the year 1914 in Brazil.

== Incumbents ==
=== Federal government ===
- President: Marshal Hermes da Fonseca (until 14 November); Venceslau Brás (from 15 November)
- Vice President: Venceslau Brás (until 14 November); Urbano Santos da Costa Araújo (from 15 November)

=== Governors ===
- Alagoas: Clodoaldo da Fonseca
- Amazonas: Jônatas de Freitas Pedrosa
- Bahia: José Joaquim Seabra
- Ceará:
  - till 14 March: Marcos Franco Rabelo
  - 15 March - 14 June: Fernando Setembrino de Carvalho
  - from 14 June: Benjamin Liberato Barroso
- Goiás:
  - until 6 July: Olegário Herculano da Silva Pinto
  - from 6 July: Salatiel Simões de Lima
- Maranhão:
  - till 1 March: Luís Antônio Domingues da Silva
  - 1 March - 26 April: Afonso Gifwning de Matos
  - from 26 April: Herculano Nina Parga
- Mato Grosso: Joaquim Augusto da Costa Marques
- Minas Gerais:
  - till 7 September: Júlio Bueno Brandão
  - from 7 September: Delfim Moreira
- Pará: Enéas Martins
- Paraíba: João Castro Pinto
- Paraná: Carlos Cavalcanti de Albuquerque
- Pernambuco: Emídio Dantas Barreto
- Piaui: Miguel de Paiva Rosa
- Rio Grande do Norte: Joaquim Ferreira Chaves
- Rio Grande do Sul: Antônio Augusto Borges de Medeiros
- Santa Catarina:
- São Paulo:
- Sergipe:

=== Vice governors ===
- Rio Grande do Norte:
- São Paulo:

== Events ==
- 1 January at 12:00 a.m. Local Mean Time States and territories now observe the four standard time zones, moving clocks forward or backward by a few minutes and seconds according to the then civil time by law since 18 June, 1913.
- 1 March - In the presidential election, incumbent Vice-President Venceslau Brás, of the Mineiro Republican Party, receives 91.6% of the vote.
- 20 May - Brazil participates in the Niagara Falls peace conference, in at attempt to avoid war between the United States and Mexico.
- 8 June - The Brazilian Football Confederation is founded, with Álvaro Zamith as its first president. The Brazilian Olympic Committee is founded on the same day.
- 14 September - The British Royal Navy auxiliary cruiser HMS Carmania fought the German SMS Cap Trafalgar off Trindade in the Battle of Trindade. Carmania sank Cap Trafalgar, but sustained severe damage herself.
- 15 November - Venceslau Brás is sworn in as Brazil's ninth president.

== Births ==
- 14 March - Abdias do Nascimento, Afro-Brazilian scholar, artist, and politician (died 2011)
- 18 May - Cacilda Borges Barbosa, pianist, conductor and composer (died 2010)
- 26 May - Sister Dulce, Catholic Franciscan Sister (died 1992)
- 29 May - José Eugênio Corrêa, Bishop of Caratinga 1957-1978 (died 2010)
- 6 July - Otto Bumbel, football player and manager (died 1992)
- 14 July - Marcelo Damy, physicist (died 2009)

== Deaths ==
- 18 June - Sílvio Romero, Condorist" poet, essayist, literary critic, professor and journalist (born 1851)
- 12 November - Augusto dos Anjos, poet and academic (born 1884;pneumonia)

== See also ==
- 1914 in Brazilian football
