= 1899 in Brazil =

Events in the year 1899 in Brazil.

== Incumbents ==
=== Federal government ===
- President: Manuel Ferraz de Campos Sales
- Vice President: Francisco de Assis Rosa e Silva

=== Governors ===
- List of governors of Alagoas: Manuel Jose Duarte (until 17 June), Francisco Manuel dos Santos (starting 17 June)
- Amazonas: José Cardoso Ramalho Júnior
- Bahia: Luís Viana
- Ceará: Antônio Nogueira Accioli
- List of governors of Goiás: Urbano Coelho de Gouveia
- Maranhão: João Gualberto Torreão da Costa
- Mato Grosso: Antônio Cesário de Figueiredo (until 4 July); João Pedro Xavier Câmara; Antônio Leite de Figueiredo; Antônio Pedro Alves de Barros (from 15 August)
- Minas Gerais: Silviano Brandão
- List of governors of Pará: Pais de Carvalho
- List of governors of Paraíba: Antônio Alfredo Mello
- Paraná: Santos Andrade; then José Bernardino Bormann; then Santos Andrade
- List of governors of Pernambuco: Joaquim Correia de Araújo (until 4 April); Sigismundo Antônio Gonçalves (from 4 April)
- List of governors of Piauí: Raimundo Artur de Vasconcelos
- Rio Grande do Norte: Joaquim Ferreira Chaves
- Rio Grande do Sul: Antônio Augusto Borges de Medeiros
- List of governors of Santa Catarina:
- Lista de Governadores de São Paulo:
- List of governors of Sergipe:

=== Vice governors ===
- List of vice governors of Rio Grande do Norte:
- List of vice governors of São Paulo:

== Events ==
=== January ===
- 2 January: Bolivia sets up a customs office in Puerto Alonso, leading to the Brazilian settlers there to declare the Republic of Acre in a revolt against Bolivian authorities.

=== May ===
- 13 May: Esporte Clube Vitória is founded in Salvador, Bahia.

=== July ===
- 14 July: Luis Gálvez Rodríguez de Arias proclaims the First Republic of Acre, breaching the terms of the Treaty of Ayacucho between Brazil and Bolivia.
- 16 July: Roberto Landell de Moura performs the first public demonstration of his Wave Transmitter.

=== August ===
- 26 August: Campo Grande, the current capital of the state of Mato Grosso do Sul, is founded.

== Literature ==
- Joaquim Maria Machado de Assis - Dom Casmurro

== Births ==
- 1 January - Nonô (footballer) (died 1931)
- 3 February - Café Filho, politician (died 1970)
- 16 June - Dante Milano, modernist poet (died 1991)
- 19 June - Antonio dos Reis Carneiro, basketball administrator (date of death unknown)
- 3 October - Artur da Costa e Silva, President 1967-1969 (died 1969)
- 23 November - Manuel dos Reis Machado, master practitioner of capoeira (died 1974)

== Deaths ==
- 25 January - Alfredo Maria Adriano d'Escragnolle Taunay, Viscount of Taunay, writer, musician, professor, military engineer, historian and politician (born 1843)
- 13 November - Almeida Júnior, painter (born 1850; murdered)
