= 1888 in Brazil =

Events in the year 1888 in Brazil.

== Incumbents ==
- Monarch: Pedro II
- Prime Minister: João Alfredo Correia de Oliveira

== Events ==
- May 7 – The bill to abolish slavery is presented in the Brazilian Chamber of Deputies.
- May 13 – Princess Isabel signs the Lei Áurea (Golden Law), which abolishes slavery in Brazil.

== Births ==
- September 3 – Nereu Ramos, 20th president of Brazil (died 1958)
- December 29 – Gustavo Barroso, lawyer and politician (died 1957)

== Deaths ==
- January 17 – Robert Reid Kalley, Scottish missionary who introduced Presbyterian to Brazil (born 1809)
- August 18 – Franklin Távora, lawyer and politician (born 1842)
