= 1866 in Brazil =

Events in the year 1866 in Brazil.

== Incumbents ==
- Monarch: Pedro II
- Prime Minister:
  - Marquis of Olinda (until 3 August)
  - Zacarias de Góis e Vasconcelos (starting 3 August)

== Events ==
- April 16 - Paraguayan War: Brazilian troops, under Marshal Manuel Luís Osório, cross the Rio Paraguay and stop at Fort Itapirú.
- May 2 - Battle of Estero Bellaco An alliance between the Republic of Argentina, the Empire of Brazil and the Oriental Republic of Uruguay defeats the forces of the Paraguayan government of Marshal Francisco Solano López.
- May 24 - First Battle of Tuyutí: Paraguayan troops make a surprise attack on allied forces in a swampy area of savannah. The result is a massive defeat for Paraguay.
- September 1–3 - Battle of Curuzú: Brazil's battleships Bahia, Barroso, Lima Barros, Rio de Janeiro and Tamandaré go into action against Paraguay. Rio de Janeiro is sunk the following day by mines, but the Curuzu Fort is successfully taken.
- September 22 - Battle of Curupayty: The joint force of the Imperial (Brazilian), Argentine and Uruguayan armies attacks Paraguayan fortified trenches on Curupaity. The Imperial fleet consists of five ironclads, 2 vessels bombers, 3 flat bombers and 6 gunboats led by Admiral Joaquim Marques Lisboa, Marquis of Tamandaré.

== Arts and culture ==
=== Books ===
- José de Alencar - As minas de prata (part 2).

=== Music ===
- Arthur Napoleão dos Santos - O remorso vivo (opera).

== Births ==
- January 20 - Euclides da Cunha, journalist, sociologist and engineer (died 1909).
- May 19 - Prince Peter of Saxe-Coburg and Gotha, son of Princess Leopoldina of Brazil (died 1934).
- August 6 - Carlos de Campos, politician and President of the State of São Paulo 1924-1927 (died 1927).
- November 4 - Malvina Tavares, anarchist, poet, and educator (died 1939).

== Deaths ==
- July 2 - Antônio de Sousa Neto, abolitionist politician (born 1801).
- July 15 - Paulino Soares de Sousa, 1st Viscount of Uruguai, politician and diplomat (born 1808).
