= 1913 in Brazil =

Events in the year 1913 in Brazil.

== Incumbents ==
=== Federal government ===
- President: Marshal Hermes da Fonseca
- Vice President: Venceslau Brás

=== Governors ===
- Alagoas: Clodoaldo da Fonseca
- Amazonas: Jônatas de Freitas Pedrosa
- Bahia: José Joaquim Seabra
- Ceará: Marcos Franco Rabelo
- Goiás:
  - until June 10: Herculano de Sousa Lobo
  - June 10 - July 31: Joaquim Rufino Ramos Jubé
  - From July 31: Olegário Herculano da Silva Pinto
- Maranhão: Luís Antônio Domingues da Silva
- Mato Grosso: Joaquim Augusto da Costa Marques
- Minas Gerais: Júlio Bueno Brandão
- Pará:
  - until February 1: João Antônio Luís Coelho
  - from February 1: Enéas Martins
- Paraíba: João Castro Pinto
- Paraná: Carlos Cavalcanti de Albuquerque
- Pernambuco: Emídio Dantas Barreto
- Piaui: Miguel de Paiva Rosa
- Rio Grande do Norte: Alberto Maranhão
- Rio Grande do Sul:
  - until 25 January: Carlos Barbosa Gonçalves
  - from 25 January: Antônio Augusto Borges de Medeiros
- Santa Catarina:
- São Paulo: Rodrigues Alves
- Sergipe:

=== Vice governors ===
- Rio Grande do Norte:
- São Paulo:

== Events ==
- 24 January - Borges de Medeiros begins his second term as President of Rio Grande do Sul, taking over from Carlos Barbosa Gonçalves.
- 11 July - Brazil's foreign minister, Lauro Müller, entertains US dignitaries on board the battleship Minas Geraes during his visit to New York.
- 12 December - Roosevelt–Rondon Scientific Expedition: Following a speaking tour in Brazil and Argentina, former US President Theodore Roosevelt meets up with Cândido Rondon to embark on a joint exploration of the "River of Doubt".

== Births ==
- 12 January - Rubem Braga, writer
- 19 February (in Eu, France) - Prince Pedro Gastão of Orléans-Braganza, claimant to the Brazilian throne (died 2007)
- 1 October - Hélio Gracie, martial artist, founder of Brazilian Jiu-Jitsu (died 2009)
- 20 October - Cecilia Miranda de Carvalho, singer (died 2011)
- 12 November - Teleco, footballer (died 2000)

== Deaths ==
- 21 January - Aluísio Azevedo, novelist, caricaturist, diplomat, playwright and short story writer (born 1857)
- 11 August - Brasílio Itiberê da Cunha, composer, lawyer and diplomat (born 1846)

== See also ==
- 1913 in Brazilian football
