= 1909 in Brazil =

Events of the year 1909 in the Brazil.

== Incumbents ==
=== Federal government ===
- President: Afonso Pena (until 14 June); Nilo Peçanha (starting 14 June)
- Vice President: Nilo Peçanha (until 14 June); vacant (starting 14 June)

=== Governors ===
- Alagoas:
  - till 3 March: Euclid Vieira Malta
  - 3 March-12 June: José Miguel de Vasconcelos
  - from 12 June: Euclid Vieira Malta
- Amazonas: Antônio Clemente Ribeiro Bittencourt
- Bahia: João Ferreira de Araújo Pinho
- Ceará: Antônio Nogueira Accioli
- Goiás:
  - until March 11: Miguel da Rocha Lima
  - March 11 - May 1: Francisco Bertoldo de Sousa
  - May 1 - July 24: José da Silva Batista
  - From July 24: Urbano Coelho de Gouveia
- Maranhão:
  - until February 25: Arthur Collares
  - February 25 - June 29: Mariano Martins Lisboa Neto
  - from June 29: Américo Vespúcio dos Reis
- Mato Grosso: Pedro Celestino Corrêa da Costa
- Minas Gerais:
  - until 3 April: Júlio Bueno Brandão
  - from 3 April: Venceslau Brás
- Pará:
  - until 1 February: Augusto Montenegro
  - from 1 February: João Antônio Luís Coelho
- Paraíba: João Lopes Machado
- Paraná: Francisco Xavier da Silva
- Pernambuco: Herculano Bandeira de Melo
- Piauí:
  - until 5 December: Anísio Auto de Abreu
  - from 5 December: Manuel Raimundo da Paz
- Rio Grande do Norte: Alberto Maranhão
- Rio Grande do Sul: Carlos Barbosa Gonçalves
- Santa Catarina:
- São Paulo:
- Sergipe:

=== Vice governors ===
- Rio Grande do Norte:
- São Paulo:

== Events ==
=== January ===
- 17 January: The Federal University of Amazonas is founded.
- 20 January: Brazil's new cruiser, Bahia, is launched.

=== April ===
- 14 April: Physician Carlos Chagas discovers a tropical parasitic disease caused by the flagellated cinetoplastid protozoan Trypanosoma cruzi, in the mining town of Lassance.
- 19 April: Brazil's new battleship, São Paulo, is launched at Barrow-in-Furness, UK, by Regis de Oliveira, the wife of Brazil's minister to Great Britain.

=== May ===
- 17 May: The football club Paulista Futebol Clube is founded.

=== September ===
- 8 September: The Velarde-Río Branco treaty between Brazil and Peru is signed, establishing borders south of the Yavarí.
- 19 September: The country's first automobile race is held at the São Gonçalo circuit in Rio de Janeiro.

== Births ==
=== February ===
- 7 February - Hélder Câmara, Catholic archbishop (died 1999)
- 21 February - Mário Wallace Simonsen, businessman (died 1965)

=== August ===
- 4 August - Roberto Burle Marx, landscape architect (died 1994)

=== September ===
- 13 September - Prince Pedro Henrique of Orléans-Braganza, claimant to the abolished imperial throne of Brazil (in France; died 1981).
- 26 September - Geraldo de Proença Sigaud, Archbishop of Diamantina 1960-1980 (died 1999)

=== November ===
- 21 November - Octacílio Pinheiro Guerra, footballer (died 1967)

== Deaths ==
- 6 March - João Barbosa Rodrigues, botanist and engineer (born 1842)
- 14 June - Afonso Pena, lawyer and politician, President of Brazil (born 1847)
- 15 August - Euclides da Cunha, journalist, sociologist and engineer (born 1866)
- 27 November - Prince Luigi, Count of Roccaguglielma, son of Princess Januária of Brazil (born 1845)

== See also ==
- 1909 in Brazilian football
