= 1916 in Brazil =

Events in the year 1916 in Brazil.

== Incumbents ==
=== Federal government ===
- President: Venceslau Brás
- Vice President: Urbano Santos da Costa Araújo

=== Governors ===
- Alagoas: João Batista Accioli Jr.
- Amazonas: Jônatas de Freitas Pedrosa
- Bahia: José Joaquim Seabra, then Antônio Ferrão Muniz de Aragão
- Ceará:
  - till 12 July: Benjamin Liberato Barroso
  - from 12 July: João Tomé de Sabóia e Silva
- Goiás:
  - till 6 May: Joaquim Rufino Ramos Jubé
  - 6 May - October 13: Salatiel Simões de Lima
  - from October 13: Aprígio José de Sousa
- Maranhão: Herculano Nina Parga
- Mato Grosso: Caetano Manuel de Faria e Albuquerque
- Minas Gerais: Delfim Moreira
- Pará: Enéas Martins
- Paraíba:
  - till 1 July: Antônio da Silva Pessoa
  - 1 July - 22 October: Sólon Barbosa de Lucena
  - from 22 October: Francisco Camilo de Holanda
- Paraná:
  - Carlos Cavalcanti de Albuquerque
  - Afonso Camargo
- Pernambuco: Manuel Antônio Pereira Borba
- Piauí:
  - till 1 July: Miguel de Paiva Rosa
  - from 1 July: Eurípedes Clementino de Aguiar
- Rio Grande do Norte: Joaquim Ferreira Chaves
- Rio Grande do Sul: Antônio Augusto Borges de Medeiros
- Santa Catarina:
- São Paulo: Rodrigues Alves (until 1 May); Altino Arantes Marques (from 1 May)
- Sergipe:

=== Vice governors ===
- Rio Grande do Norte:
- São Paulo:

== Events ==
- 5 March - The liner Príncipe de Asturias runs aground in fog on the shoals out of Ponta do Boi, in the island of Sao Sebastião, while trying to approach the port of Santos. At least 445 people out of the 588 aboard are killed.
- 3 May - Brazilian merchant ship Rio Branco is sunk by a German submarine. Because the ship is in restricted waters and registered under the British flag, and most of its crew is Norwegian, it is not considered an illegal attack by the Brazilian government, despite public protests.
- August
  - Brazilian Naval Aviation is established, in preparation for the country's participation in the First World War.
  - The capture of rebel leader Deodato Manuel Ramos ("Adeodato") marks the effective end of the Contestado War.

== Births ==
- 5 April - Carmen Silva, actress (died 2008)
- 30 April - Armando Círio, Archbishop of Cascavel 1979-1995 (died 2014)
- 14 July - Franco Montoro, lawyer and politician (died 1999)
- 16 July - Victor Fontana, engineer, businessman and politician (died 2017)
- 22 July - Gino Bianco, Italian-born racing driver (died 1984)
- 6 October - Ulysses Guimarães, politician (died 1992)
- 19 December - Manoel de Barros, poet (died 2014)

== Deaths ==
- 24 August - João Zeferino da Costa, artist (born 1840)

== See also ==
- 1916 in Brazilian football
