= 1907 in Brazil =

Events in the year 1907 in Brazil.

== Incumbents ==
=== Federal government ===
- President: Afonso Pena
- Vice President: Nilo Peçanha

=== Governors ===
- Alagoas: Euclid Vieira Malta
- Amazonas: Antônio Constantino Néri
- Bahia: José Marcelino de Sousa
- Ceará: Antônio Nogueira Accioli
- Goiás: Miguel da Rocha Lima
- Maranhão: Benedito Pereira Leite
- Mato Grosso: Pedro Leite Osório, then Generoso Pais Leme de Sousa Ponce
- Minas Gerais: João Pinheiro da Silva
- Pará: Augusto Montenegro
- Paraíba: Valfredo Leal
- Paraná: João Cândido Ferreira, Joaquim Monteiro de Carvalho e Silva
- Pernambuco: Sigismundo Antônio Gonçalves
- Piauí: Álvaro de Assis Osório Mendes (until 5 December); Areolino Antônio de Abreu (from 5 December)
- Rio Grande do Norte: Manuel Moreira Dias (until 23 February); Antonio José de Melo e Sousa (from 23 February)
- Rio Grande do Sul: Antônio Augusto Borges de Medeiros
- Santa Catarina:
- São Paulo:
- Sergipe:

=== Vice governors ===
- Rio Grande do Norte:
- São Paulo:

== Events ==
- 7 January - Three new battleships on which construction work is in progress are scrapped as a result of changes to the Brazilian government's requirements.
- 20 February - The Brazilian government approves the design for its new battleships.
- 20 April - Brazil annexed land in the East from Colombia through the Vásquez Cobo–Martins treaty.
- 30 April - The keel of Brazil's latest dreadnought battleship "São Paulo" is laid down at the Vickers shipyard, Barrow-in-Furness, UK.
- date unknown
  - Construction of the Madeira-Mamoré Railroad begins, linking the cities of Porto Velho and Guajará-Mirim.
  - The first Brazilian diplomats are officially accredited by the government of Costa Rica.

== Arts and culture ==
- Olavo Bilac is elected the "Prince of Brazilian Poets" by the magazine Fon-Fon.

== Births ==
- 29 January - Clóvis Graciano, artist (died 1988)
- 9 February - Victor Civita, Italian-Brazilian journalist and publisher, in New York, USA (died 1990)
- 29 March - Braguinha, composer (died 2006)
- 4 April - Otávio Fantoni, soccer player (died 1935)
- 18 April - Manoel de Castro Villas Bôas, entrepreneur, writer and journalist (d. 1979)
- 22 May - Luiz Gervazoni, footballer (died 1963)
- 12 June - José Reis, scientist and journalist (died 2002)
- 3 August - Ernesto Geisel, military leader and politician (died 1996)
- 15 December - Oscar Niemeyer, architect (died 2012)

== Deaths ==
- 1 October - Geraldo Ribeiro de Sousa Resende, Baron Geraldo of Resende, aristocrat, farmer and politician (born 1847)

== See also ==
- 1907 in Brazilian football
