= 1833 in Brazil =

Events in the year 1833 in Brazil.

== Incumbents ==
- Monarch: Pedro II

== Events ==
- December 15: José Bonifácio de Andrada e Silva is suspended from his duties as Dom Pedro II's tutor and is replaced by the Marquis of Itanhaém by decree.

== Deaths ==
- January 16: Princess Paula of Brazil (born 1823)
