= 1902 in Brazil =

Events in the year 1902 in Brazil.

== Incumbents ==
=== Federal government ===
- President:
  - Campos Sales (to 14 November)
  - Rodrigues Alves (from 15 November)
- Vice President:
  - Francisco de Assis Rosa e Silva (to 14 November)
  - Afonso Pena (from 15 November)

=== Governors ===
- Alagoas: Euclides Vieira Malta
- Amazonas: Silvério José Néri
- Bahia: Severino Vieira
- Ceará: Antônio Nogueira Accioli
- Goiás: José Xavier de Almeida
- Maranhão:
  - until 1 March: João Gualberto Torreão da Costa
  - from 1 March: Manuel Lopes da Cunha
- Mato Grosso: Antônio Pedro Alves de Barros
- Minas Gerais:
  - until 21 February: Silviano Brandão
  - 21 February - 7 September: Joaquim Cândido da Costa Sena
  - from 7 September: Francisco Salles
- Pará: Augusto Montenegro
- Paraíba: José Peregrino de Araújo
- Paraná: Francisco Xavier da Silva
- Pernambuco: Antônio Gonçalves Ferreira
- Piauí: Arlindo Francisco Nogueira
- Rio Grande do Norte: Alberto Maranhão
- Rio Grande do Sul: Antônio Augusto Borges de Medeiros
- Santa Catarina: Felipe Schmidt (until 28 September); Lauro Müller
- São Paulo:
- Sergipe:

=== Vice governors ===
- Rio Grande do Norte:
- São Paulo:

== Events ==
- 1 March - Presidential election: Rodrigues Alves of the Republican Party of São Paulo receives 91.7% of the vote. Francisco Silviano de Almeida Brandão is elected vice-president but dies suddenly before the start of his term of office.
- 26 March – The Prinetti Decree is approved by the Italian General Commissariat of Emigration suspending emigration to Brazil of all Italians not paying their own passage. The decree was named after the then Italian foreign affairs minister, Giulio Prinetti, and approved based on a report denouncing the terrible living conditions experienced by Italian immigrants who had become virtual serfs on the coffee plantations in the state of São Paulo, with no medical care, no school for their children, small houses, no minimum hygiene conditions, and physical violence, even the use of whips.
- 26 October - The first season of competitive football in Brazil concludes with a victory for São Paulo Athletic Club.
- 3 December - José Paranhos, Baron of Rio Branco, is appointed Minister of Foreign Affairs. His ten-year tenure would be the longest in the country's history.

== Literature ==
- Euclides da Cunha - Os Sertões

== Births ==
- 22 April - Elsie Houston, singer (died 1943)
- 12 September - Juscelino Kubitschek, politician (died 1976)
- 31 October - Carlos Drummond de Andrade, poet (died 1987)
- 18 December - Moacyr Siqueira de Queiroz ("Russinho"), footballer (died 1992)

== Deaths ==
- 15 March - Custódio José de Melo, monarchist admiral and politician, foreign minister 1892
- 12 May - Augusto Severo de Albuquerque Maranhão, politician and journalist
- 6 July - Leopoldo Miguez, composer (born 1850)
- 3 September - Eduardo Wandenkolk, naval officer and politician
- 25 September - Silviano Brandão, vice-president elect
- 9 November - Manuel Vitorino Pereira, 2nd vice-president of Brazil
- 3 December - Prudente de Morais, politician, President of Brazil 1894-1898 (born 1841)

== See also ==
- 1902 in Brazilian football
