= 1871 in Brazil =

Events from the year 1871 in Brazil.

== Incumbents ==
- Monarch: Pedro II
- Prime Minister:
  - Marquis of São Vicente (until 7 March)
  - Viscount of Rio Branco (starting 7 March)

== Events ==
- September 28 - Law of Free Birth, or Rio Branco Law, passed by Brazilian Parliament, intending to provide freedom to all newborn children of slaves, and slaves of the state or crown.

== Births ==
- August 27 - José Monteiro Ribeiro Junqueira, politician from Minas Gerais (died 1946)
- September 12 - Mário Alves Monteiro Tourinho, general (died 1964)

== Deaths ==
- February 7 - Princess Leopoldina of Brazil, daughter of Pedro II
- July 6 - Castro Alves, poet
- August 11 -Marcos Antônio Brício, politician (born 1800)
- August 25 - José de Aquino Pinheiro, colonel of the Brazilian National Guard
- November 22 - Francisco Antônio Rocha Pita e Argolo, baron and viscount (born 1831)
