= 1917 in Brazil =

Events in the year 1917 in Brazil.

== Incumbents ==
=== Federal government ===
- President: Venceslau Brás
- Vice President: Urbano Santos da Costa Araújo

=== Governors ===
- Alagoas: João Batista Accioli Jr.
- Amazonas: Pedro de Alcântara Bacelar
- Bahia: Antônio Ferrão Muniz de Aragão
- Ceará: João Tomé de Sabóia e Silva
- Goiás:
  - until 9 May: Aprígio José de Sousa
  - 9 May - 14 July: Salatiel Simões de Lima
  - from 14 July: João Alves de Castro
- Maranhão:
  - until 20 March: Herculano Nina Parga
  - from 20 March Antônio Brício de Araújo
- Mato Grosso: Caetano Manuel de Faria e Albuquerque, then Camilo Soares de Moura, then Cipriano da Costa Ferreira
- Minas Gerais: Delfim Moreira
- Pará:
  - until 1 February: Enéas Martins
  - from 1 February: Lauro Sodré
- Paraíba: Francisco Camilo de Holanda
- Paraná: Afonso Camargo
- Pernambuco: Manuel Antônio Pereira Borba
- Piauí: Eurípedes Clementino de Aguiar
- Rio Grande do Norte: Joaquim Ferreira Chaves
- Rio Grande do Sul: Antônio Augusto Borges de Medeiros
- Santa Catarina:
- São Paulo:
- Sergipe:

=== Vice governors ===
- Rio Grande do Norte:
- São Paulo:

== Events ==
- 5 April - The steamship Paraná, loaded with coffee and travelling in accordance with the demands made on neutral countries, is torpedoed by a German submarine; three Brazilians are killed.
- 11 April - Brazil breaks off diplomatic relations with Germany.
- 7 May - Foreign Minister Lauro Müller is obliged to resign because of his German origins.
- 20 May - The ship Tijuca is torpedoed near the French coast by a German submarine.
- 27 July - The steamer Lapa Brazil is hit by three torpedoes from a German submarine.
- 23 October - The Brazilian freighter Macau, one of the vessels seized in the course of the war, was torpedoed by the German submarine SM U-93 near the coast of Spain, and the captain taken prisoner.
- 26 October - World War I: Brazil declares war on the Central Powers.
- 1 November - A mob damages German property in Petropolis, including the restaurant Brahma (completely destroyed), the Gesellschaft Germania, the German school, the company Arp, and the German Journal.
- 4 November - Acari Guaíba and another ship are torpedoed by the same German submarine, SM U-151.

== Births ==
- 9 January - Otto Glória, football coach (died 1986)
- 25 January - Jânio Quadros, 22nd President of Brazil (died 1992)
- 21 February - Luz del Fuego, ballerina, naturist and feminist (as Dora Vivacqua; died 1967)
- 17 April - Roberto de Oliveira Campos, economist, writer and politician (died 2001)
- 5 May - Dalva de Oliveira, singer (died 1972)
- 31 May - Zilka Salaberry, actress (died 2005)
- 2 September - Laurindo Almeida, guitarist and composer (died 1995)
- 30 September - Chacrinha, comedian, radio and TV personality (died 1988)

== Deaths ==
- 11 February - Oswaldo Cruz, physician, pioneer bacteriologist, epidemiologist and public health officer (born 1872)
- 22 October - Manuel Lopes Rodrigues, artist (born 1860)

== See also ==
- 1917 in Brazilian football
