= 1894 in Brazil =

Events from the year 1894 in Brazil.

== Incumbents ==
=== Federal government ===
- President:
  - Marshal Floriano Peixoto (until 14 November)
  - Prudente de Morais (starting 15 November)
- Vice-President:
  - Vacant (until 14 November)
  - Manuel Vitorino (starting 15 November)

=== Governors ===
- Alagoas:
  - until 16 June: Gabino Besuoro
  - 16 June-17 July: Provisional Government
  - 17 July-17 October: Tiburcio Valeriano da Rocha Lima
  - starting 17 October: Manuel Gomes Ribeiro
- Amazonas: Eduardo Gonçalves Ribeiro
- Bahia: Rodrigues Lima
- Ceará: Antônio Nogueira Accioli
- Goiás: José Inácio Xavier de Brito
- Maranhão: Casimiro Vieira Jr
- Mato Grosso:
  - until 7 September: Afonso Pena
  - from 7 September: Bias Fortes
- Minas Gerais:
- Pará: Lauro Sodré
- Paraíba: Álvaro Lopes Machado
- Paraná: Vicente Machado da Silva Lima, then Teófilo Soares Gomes, then João Meneses Dória, then Francisco José Cardoso Júnior, then Tertuliano Teixeira de Freitas, then Antônio José Ferreira Braga, then Vicente Machado da Silva Lima, then Francisco Xavier da Silva
- Pernambuco: Alexandre José Barbosa Lima
- Piauí: Coriolano de Carvalho e Silva
- Rio Grande do Norte: Pedro de Albuquerque Maranhão
- Rio Grande do Sul:
  - until 25 January: Fernando Fernandes Abbott
  - from 25 January: Júlio de Castilhos
- Santa Catarina: Hercílio Luz
- São Paulo: Bernardino Jose de Campos Junior
- Sergipe:

=== Vice governors ===
- Rio de Janeiro: Manuel Torres (until 31 December)
- Rio Grande do Norte: Silvino Bezerra
- São Paulo: José Alves de Cerqueira César

== Events ==
- January - Rio de Janeiro Affair: a series of incidents during the Brazilian Naval Revolt.
- March 1 - Brazilian presidential election, 1894
- June 27 - Federalist Revolution: Battle of Passo Fundo in the state of Rio Grande do Sul
- November 15 - Inauguration of Prudente de Morais as president.

== Births ==
- January 4 - Manuel de Abreu, physician, scientist and inventor (died 1962)
- February 15 - Osvaldo Aranha, politician and diplomat (died 1960)
- November 5 - Djalma Guimarães, geochemist (died 1973)

== Deaths ==
- February 9 - Gomes Carneiro, army officer (born 1846)
- November 24 - Pardal Mallet, novelist and journalist (born 1864; tuberculosis)
