= 1863 in Brazil =

Events in the year 1863 in Brazil.

== Incumbents ==
- Monarch – Pedro II
- Prime Minister: Marquis of Olinda

== Births ==
- 19 November - Borges de Medeiros
