= 1911 in Brazil =

Events in the year 1911 in Brazil.

== Incumbents ==
=== Federal government ===
- President: Marshal Hermes da Fonseca
- Vice President: Venceslau Brás

=== Governors ===
- Alagoas: Euclid Vieira Malta
- Amazonas: Antônio Clemente Ribeiro Bittencourt
- Bahia: João Ferreira de Araújo Pinho, then Aurélio Rodrigues Viana
- Ceará: Antônio Nogueira Accioli
- Goiás: Urbano Coelho de Gouveia
- Maranhão: Luís Antônio Domingues da Silva
- Mato Grosso: Pedro Celestino Corrêa da Costa, then Joaquim Augusto da Costa Marques
- Minas Gerais: Júlio Bueno Brandão
- Pará: João Antônio Luís Coelho
- Paraíba: João Lopes Machado
- Paraná: Francisco Xavier da Silva
- Pernambuco: Herculano Bandeira de Melo(till 6 September); Estácio Coimbra (6 September - 13 December); João da Costa Bezerra de Carvalho (13 December - 19 December); Emídio Dantas Barreto (from 19 December)
- Piauí: Antonino Freire da Silva
- Rio Grande do Norte: Alberto Maranhão
- Rio Grande do Sul: Carlos Barbosa Gonçalves
- Santa Catarina:
- São Paulo:
- Sergipe:

=== Vice governors ===
- Rio Grande do Norte:
- São Paulo:

== Events ==
- 10 January - The cargo ship SS São Luiz runs aground off the coast of Rio Grande do Norte.
- March - Future President Getúlio Vargas marries Darcy Lima Sarmanho.
- 5 March - The Faculdade de Medicina da Universidade Federal de Minas Gerais, one of the earliest medical schools in the country, is founded in Belo Horizonte.
- 1 April - Guarani Futebol Clube is founded in Campinas, São Paulo, by a group of 12 students.
- 15 November - Clube 15 de Novembro is founded at Campo Bom in Rio Grande do Sul.

== Arts and culture ==
=== Books ===
- Lima Barreto - Triste Fim de Policarpo Quaresma

=== Films ===
- O conde de Luxemburgo

== Births ==
- 8 February - Lélia Abramo, Italian-Brazilian actress and political activist (died 2004)
- 19 February - Prince Luiz Gastão of Orléans-Braganza, descendant of the Brazilian Imperial Family (died 1931)
- 15 March - Afrânio Coutinho, literary critic and essayist (died 2000)
- 12 May - Charles Sergel, surgeon, missionary doctor and Olympic rower (died 1980)
- 16 June - Paulo Gracindo, actor (died 1995)
- 14 August - Bernardo Segall, film composer (died 1993)
- 21 August - Golbery do Couto e Silva, military leader (died 1987)
- 24 October - Manuel Martins, artist (died 1979)
- 5 December - Carlos Marighella, Marxist revolutionary and writer (died 1969)

== Deaths ==
- 26 July - José Alves de Cerqueira César, politician (born 1835)
- 13 September - Raimundo Correia, poet, judge and magistrate (born 1859)

== See also ==
- 1911 in Brazilian football
