= 1918 in Brazil =

Events in the year 1918 in Brazil.

== Incumbents ==
=== Federal government ===
- President: Venceslau Brás (until 14 November); Delfim Moreira (acting; from 15 November)
- Vice President: Urbano Santos da Costa Araújo (until 14 November); Delfim Moreira (from 15 November)

=== Governors ===
- Alagoas: João Batista Accioli Jr. (till 12 June); José Fernandes de Barros Lima (from 12 June)
- Amazonas: Pedro de Alcântara Bacelar
- Bahia: Antônio Ferrão Muniz de Aragão
- Ceará: João Tomé de Sabóia e Silva
- Goiás:
  - until 21 December: João Alves de Castro
  - from 21 December: Joaquim Rufino Ramos Jubé
- Maranhão:
  - until 1 March: Antônio Brício de Araújo
  - 1 March - 9 October: José Joaquim Marques
  - 9 October - 21 October: Raul da Cunha Machado
  - from 21 October: Urbano Santos
- Mato Grosso: Cipriano da Costa Ferreira, then Francisco de Aquino Correia
- Minas Gerais:
  - until 7 September: Delfim Moreira
  - from 7 September: Artur Bernardes
- Pará: Lauro Sodré
- Paraíba: Francisco Camilo de Holanda
- Paraná: Afonso Camargo
- Pernambuco: Manuel Antônio Pereira Borba
- Piauí: Eurípedes Clementino de Aguiar
- Rio Grande do Norte: Joaquim Ferreira Chaves
- Rio Grande do Sul: Antônio Augusto Borges de Medeiros
- Santa Catarina:
- São Paulo:
- Sergipe:

=== Vice governors ===
- Rio Grande do Norte:
- São Paulo:

== Events ==
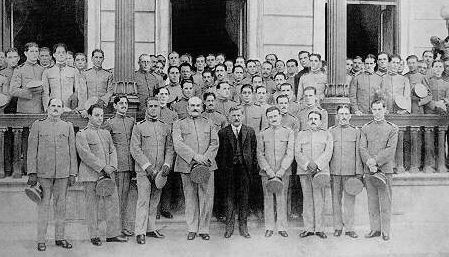
Brazilian Medical Mission.

- 30 January - Ministerial Notice No. 501 is issued, establishing the Naval Division for War Operations (Divisão Naval em Operações de Guerra - DNOG).
- 1 March - Brazilian general election, 1918: Former president Rodrigues Alves receives 99.1% of the vote.
- June - The Brazilian battleship São Paulo is sent to the USA for a full refit.
- 18 August - The Brazilian Medical Mission, led by Dr. Nabuco Gouveia and directed by General Aché, is established with 86 doctors.
- 24 September - The Brazilian Medical Mission lands at Marseilles, France, and supports the local population during a flu outbreak, ensuring the continuity of logistical support to the troops at the front.
- 15 November - President-elect Rodrigues Alves, suffering from influenza, is unable to take office on the scheduled date, and is replaced by Vice President Delfim Moreira.

== Births ==
- 15 January - João Figueiredo, military leader and politician (died 1999)
- 21 February - Alberto Ruschel, actor (died 1996)
- 1 March - João Goulart, 24th President of Brazil (died 1976)
- 24 July - Antonio Candido, writer, academic, sociologist and literary critic (died 2017)
- 28 October - José Leite Lopes, physicist (died 2006)

== Deaths ==
- 1 November - Eurípedes Barsanulfo, educator, pharmacist, politician and prominent spiritualist medium (born 1880)
- 27 November - Belfort Duarte, footballer (born 1883; murdered)
- 28 December - Olavo Bilac, Parnassian poet, journalist and translator (born 1865)

== See also ==
- 1918 in Brazilian football
