= 1862 in Brazil =

Events in the year 1862 in Brazil.

== Incumbents ==
- Monarch: Pedro II
- Prime Minister:
  - Marquis of Caxias (until 24 May)
  - Zacarias de Góis e Vasconcelos (from 24 May to 30 May)
  - Marquis of Olinda (starting 30 May)

== Events ==
- Christie Question - British sailors were arrested in Rio de Janeiro for promoting mutinies.
