= 1928 in Brazil =

Events in the year 1928 in Brazil.

== Incumbents ==
=== Federal government ===
- President: Washington Luís
- Vice President: Fernando de Melo Viana

=== Governors ===
- Alagoas:
  - till 7 June: Pedro da Costa Rego
  - 7 June-12 June: José Julio Cansanção
  - from 12 June: Álvaro Correia Pais
- Amazonas: Ifigênio Ferreira de Sales
- Bahia: Góis Calmon (till 18 March); Vital Soares (from 19 March)
- Ceará: José Moreira da Rocha (till 19 May); Eduardo Henrique Girão (19 May - 12 July); José Carlos de Matos Peixoto (from 12 July)
- Goiás: Brasil Caiado
- Maranhão: José Magalhães de Almeida
- Mato Grosso: Mário Correia da Costa
- Minas Gerais: Antônio Carlos Ribeiro de Andrada
- Pará: Dionísio Bentes
- Paraíba:
  - till 22 October: João Suassuna
  - from 22 October: João Pessoa Cavalcanti
- Paraná: Caetano Munhoz da Rocha; Afonso Camargo
- Pernambuco: Estácio Coimbra
- Piauí:
  - till 1 July: Matias Olímpio de Melo
  - from 1 July: João de Deus Pires Leal
- Rio Grande do Norte: Juvenal Lamartine de Faria
- Rio Grande do Sul: Antônio Augusto Borges de Medeiros (till 25 January); Getúlio Dornelles Vargas (from 25 January)
- Santa Catarina: Adolf Konder
- São Paulo: Júlio Prestes
- Sergipe: Manuel Correia Dantas

=== Vice governors ===
- Rio Grande do Norte: Joaquim Inácio (starting 1 January)
- São Paulo: Heitor Teixeira Penteado

== Events ==
- 22 July - The Estádio Parque São Jorge football stadium in São Paulo is inaugurated.
- 10 August - The ETA – Empresa de Transporte Aéreo airline is founded; it remains in operation for only a year.
- 3 December - Disaster of the Dornier J 'Santos Dumont'.
- date unknown - The Liberator Party (Brazil) is founded for the first time, by members of the Rio Grande do Sul Federalist Party, notably Joaquim Francisco de Assis Brasil.

== Arts and culture ==
=== Books ===
- Mário de Andrade - Macunaíma
- Oswald de Andrade - Manifesto Antropófago

== Births ==
- 6 January - Carlos Manga, film director (died 2015)
- 1 March - Maurício do Valle, actor (died 1994)
- 13 March - Paulo Ribenboim, mathematician
- 19 March - Dequinha, footballer (died 1997)
- 23 April - Martim Francisco, association football coach (died 1982)
- 1 May
  - Delfim Netto, economist, Minister of Finance, Agriculture and Planning of Brazil, professor and congressman
  - Marcelo Pinto Carvalheira, Roman Catholic archbishop (died 2017)
- 11 May - Dulce Figueiredo, wife of Brazilian president João Figueiredo (died 2011)
- 20 May - Luiz Carlos Barreto, film producer and screenwriter (died 2026)
- 21 June – Fiorella Mari, Brazilian-Italian actress (died 1983)
- 24 July – Jardel Filho, actor (died 1983)
- 13 August – Pedro Pedrossian, politician (died 2017)
- 15 August – Manfredo do Carmo, mathematician (died 2018)
- 24 September - Aldo Vannucchi, academic
- 22 October - Nelson Pereira dos Santos, film director (died 2018)

== Deaths ==
- 30 June - Landell de Moura, Roman Catholic priest and inventor (born 1861)

== See also ==
- 1928 in Brazilian football
