= 1873 in Brazil =

Events in the year 1873 in Brazil.

== Incumbents ==
- Monarch: Pedro II
- Prime Minister: Viscount of Rio Branco

== Events ==
- Itu Convention, first Republican Convention in Brazil in Itu, 18 April

== Births ==
- 20 July - Alberto Santos-Dumont
- 9 September - José Plácido de Castro
