= 1896 in Brazil =

Events in the year 1896 in Brazil.

== Incumbents ==
=== Federal government ===
- President: Prudente de Morais
- Vice-President: Manuel Vitorino

=== Governors ===
- Alagoas: Jose Vieira Peixoto
- Amazonas: Eduardo Gonçalves Ribeiro (till 23 July); Fileto Pires Ferreira (from 23 July)
- Bahia: Rodrigues Lima then Luís Viana
- Ceará: Antônio Nogueira Accioli (till 12 July); Antônio Nogueira Accioli (from 12 July)
- Goiás: Francisco Leopoldo Rodrigues Jardim
- Maranhão:
  - till April 29: Alfredo Martins
  - from April 29: Casimiro Vieira Jr
- Mato Grosso: Manuel José Murtinho
- Minas Gerais: Bias Fortes
- Pará: Lauro Sodré
- Paraíba:
  - till October 22: Álvaro Lopes Machado
  - from October 22: Antônio Alfredo Mello
- Paraná:
  - Francisco Xavier da Silva
  - Santos Andrade
- Pernambuco:
  - till April 7: Alexandre José Barbosa Lima
  - from April 7: Joaquim Correia de Araújo
- Piauí:
  - till July 1: Coriolano de Carvalho e Silva
  - from July 1: Raimundo Artur de Vasconcelos
- Rio Grande do Norte:
  - till March 25: Pedro de Albuquerque Maranhão
  - from March 25: Joaquim Ferreira Chaves
- Rio Grande do Sul: Júlio de Castilhos
- Santa Catarina: Hercílio Luz
- São Paulo:
- Sergipe:

=== Vice governors ===
- Rio de Janeiro:
- Rio Grande do Norte:
- São Paulo:

== Events ==
- 4 November - The Brazilian government sends 100 men under the command of Lieutenant Manuel da Silva Pires Ferreira to intervene in the Canudos region.
- 21 November - The War of Canudos begins with an attack by the small force led by Pires Ferreira. They are fiercely counter-attacked by a band of 500 armed men; the Brazilian force retreats, after incurring severe losses and killing 150 of the attackers, many of whom are armed only with machetes, primitive lances and axes.
- Manuel Ferraz de Campos Sales becomes governor of São Paulo.

== Births ==
- 11 March - Olivério Pinto, zoologist and physician (died 1981)
- 16 August - Cyro de Freitas Valle, lawyer (died 1969)
- 19 August - Alda Garrido, actress (died 1970)
- 20 September - Eduardo Gomes, politician and military figure (died 1981)
- 17 December - Gustavo Corção, Roman Catholic writer (died 1978)

== Deaths ==
- 16 September - Antônio Carlos Gomes, composer (born 1836)
