= 1852 in Brazil =

Events in the year 1852 in Brazil.

== Incumbents ==
- Monarch: Pedro II
- Prime Minister:
  - Marquis of Monte Alegre (until 11 May)
  - Viscount of Itaboraí (starting 11 May)

== Events ==
- February 3 - Platine War: Battle of Caseros.
- February 20 - the victorious Brazilian Army marches through the streets of Buenos Aires, Argentina.
- June 26 - creation of the Federal Railroad Police.

== Births ==
- April 14 - Henrique Oswald, pianist and composer (d. 1931).
