= 1844 in Brazil =

Events in the year 1844 in Brazil.

== Incumbents ==
Monarch: Pedro II

== Births ==
- March 24: Padre Cícero, Roman Catholic priest

== Deaths ==
- 23 February: Martim Francisco Ribeiro de Andrada, politician (b. 1775)
