= 1867 in Brazil =

Events in the year 1867 in Brazil.

== Incumbents ==
- Monarch: Pedro II
- Prime Minister: Zacarias de Góis e Vasconcelos

== Events ==
- treaty of limits between Brazil and Bolivia was signed
