= 1870 in Brazil =

Events in the year 1870 in Brazil.

== Incumbents ==
- Monarch: Pedro II
- Prime Minister:
  - Viscount of Itaboraí (until September 29)
  - Marquis of São Vicente (starting September 29)
