= 1828 in Brazil =

Events in the year 1828 in Brazil.

== Incumbents ==
- Monarch: Pedro I
