= 1856 in Brazil =

Events in the year 1856 in Brazil.

== Incumbents ==
- Monarch: Pedro II
- Prime Minister:
  - Marquis of Paraná (until 3 September)
  - Marquis of Caxias (starting 3 September)

== Events ==
June 19 - Foundation of Ribeirao Preto
