= 1840 in Brazil =

Events in the year 1840 in Brazil.

== Incumbents ==
Monarch: Pedro II

== Events ==
- Last remaining group of Cabanagem rebels, under leadership of Gonçalo Jorge de Magalhães, surrenders
- Ragamuffin War: rebels of the Riograndense Republic refused an offer of amnesty by the Empire of Brazil, although it was clear that they had no chances of winning

== Births ==
- 9 June: Custódio José de Melo, admiral and politician (d. 1902)
