= 1848 in Brazil =

Events in the year 1848 in Brazil.

== Incumbents ==
- Monarch: Pedro II
- Prime Minister:
  - 2nd Viscount of Caravelas (until 8 March)
  - Viscount of Macaé (from 8 March to 31 March)
  - Francisco de Paula Sousa e Melo (from 31 March to 29 September)
  - Viscount of Olinda (starting 29 September)

== Events ==
- May 7 - establishment of the Roman Catholic Archdiocese of Porto Alegre as the Diocese of São Pedro do Rio Grande.
- November 6 - beginning of Praieira revolt.

== Births ==
- July 7 - Rodrigues Alves, President of Brazil from 1902 to 1906.
