= 1881 in Brazil =

Events in the year 1881 in Brazil.

== Incumbents ==
- Monarch: Pedro II
- Prime Minister: José Antônio Saraiva

== Events ==
- 9 January: Saraiva Law comes into effect after being passed on the Senate on 4 January.
