= 1906 in Brazil =

Events in the year 1906 in Brazil.

== Incumbents ==
=== Federal government ===
- President: Rodrigues Alves (till 14 November); Afonso Pena (from 15 November)
- Vice President: Afonso Pena (till 14 November); Nilo Peçanha (from 15 November)

=== Governors ===
- Alagoas: Antônio Máximo da Cunha Rego (till 12 June); Euclid Vieira Malta (from 12 June)
- Amazonas: Antônio Constantino Néri
- Bahia: José Marcelino de Sousa
- Ceará: Antônio Nogueira Accioli
- Goiás: Miguel da Rocha Lima
- Maranhão: Manuel Lopes da Cunha (till 1 March); Benedito Pereira Leite (from 1 March)
- Mato Grosso: Antônio Pais de Barros, then Pedro Leite Osório
- Minas Gerais: Francisco Salles (till 7 September); João Pinheiro da Silva (from 7 September)
- Pará: Augusto Montenegro
- Paraíba: Valfredo Leal
- Paraná: Vicente Machado da Silva Lima; João Cândido Ferreira
- Pernambuco: Sigismundo Antônio Gonçalves
- Piauí: Álvaro de Assis Osório Mendes
- Rio Grande do Norte: Augusto Tavares Lira (till 5 November); Manuel Moreira Dias (from 5 November)
- Rio Grande do Sul: Antônio Augusto Borges de Medeiros
- Santa Catarina:
- São Paulo:
- Sergipe:

=== Vice governors ===
- Rio Grande do Norte:
- São Paulo:

== Events ==
=== January ===
- 21 January: The Brazilian battleship Aquidabã sinks, after its powder magazines explode near the Jacuacanga strait, in Angra dos Reis bay. A total of 212 people are killed, including three admirals and most of the ship's officers; 98 survive.

=== March ===
- 1 March: In the presidential election, Afonso Pena of the Mineiro Republican Party receives 97.9% of the vote.

=== May ===
- 5 May: The Treaty of Limits between Brazil and the Netherlands is signed in Rio de Janeiro, establishing the international boundary between Brazil and the Dutch colony of Suriname.

=== October ===
- 23 October: An aeroplane of Alberto Santos-Dumont takes off at Bagatelle in France and flies 60 meters (200 feet). This is the first officially recorded powered flight in Europe.

=== November ===
- 9 November: The Brazilian Flag Anthem ("Hino à Bandeira Nacional"), with lyrics by Olavo Bilac and music by Francisco Braga, is performed for the first time.
- 15 November: Afonso Pena becomes the sixth president of Brazil.

== Births ==
- 27 January - Radamés Gnattali, conductor and composer (died 1988)
- 23 June - Lima Barreto, film director and screenwriter (died 1982)
- 30 July - Mário Quintana, writer and translator (died 1994)
- 14 September - Flávio Costa, football player and manager (died 1999)

== Deaths ==
- 7 October - Domingos Olímpio, novelist (born 1851)

== See also ==
- 1906 in Brazilian football
