= 1824 in Brazil =

Events in the year 1824 in Brazil.

== Incumbents ==
- Monarch: Pedro I

== Events ==
=== March ===
- March 25: The Brazilian Constitution of 1824 was adopted, establishing a hereditary Catholic monarchy headed by the emperor Dom Pedro I.

=== May ===
- May 3: The first German colonists arrive in Nova Friburgo, Rio de Janeiro.

=== July ===
- July 18: The first 39 German settlers from Rio Grande do Sul disembark in Porto Alegre.

== Births ==
- January 24: João Manuel Mena Barreto, brigadier
- February 17: José Antônio Correia da Câmara, Marshal and noble

== Deaths ==
- August 20 – João José da Cunha Fidié, a Portuguese general who led the Portuguese forces in the province of Piauí and was killed in the Battle of Jenipapo
- September 6 – João Félix Pereira, a Brazilian colonel who fought in the province of Bahia and was wounded in the Siege of Salvador.
- October 20 – Álvaro da Costa de Sousa de Macedo, a Brazilian politician and diplomat who served as the first minister of foreign affairs of Brazil and negotiated the Treaty of Rio de Janeiro with Portugal.
