= 1912 in Brazil =

Events in the year 1912 in Brazil.

== Incumbents ==
=== Federal government ===
- President: Marshal Hermes da Fonseca
- Vice President: Venceslau Brás

=== Governors ===
- Alagoas:
  - till 13 March: Euclid Vieira Malta
  - 13 March - 12 June: Macário das Chagas Rocha Lessa
  - from 12 June: Clodoaldo da Fonseca
- Amazonas: Antônio Clemente Ribeiro Bittencourt
- Bahia: Aurélio Rodrigues Viana, then Bráulio Xavier, then José Joaquim Seabra
- Ceará:
  - till 24 January: Antônio Nogueira Accioli
  - 24 January - 12 July Antônio Frederico de Carvalho Mota
  - 12 July - 14 July Belisário Cícero Alexandrino
  - from 14 July: Marcos Franco Rabelo
- Goiás:
  - until March 30: Urbano Coelho de Gouveia
  - 30 March - 24 May: Joaquim Rufino Ramos Jubé
  - from 24 May: Herculano de Sousa Lobo
- Maranhão: Luís Antônio Domingues da Silva
- Mato Grosso: Joaquim Augusto da Costa Marques
- Minas Gerais: Júlio Bueno Brandão
- Pará: João Antônio Luís Coelho
- Paraíba:
  - until 22 October: João Lopes Machado
  - from 22 October: João Castro Pinto
- Paraná:
  - Francisco Xavier da Silva
  - Carlos Cavalcanti de Albuquerque
- Pernambuco: Emídio Dantas Barreto
- Piauí:
  - until 1 July: Antonino Freire da Silva
  - from 1 July: Miguel de Paiva Rosa
- Rio Grande do Norte: Alberto Maranhão
- Rio Grande do Sul: Carlos Barbosa Gonçalves
- Santa Catarina:
- São Paulo:
- Sergipe:

=== Vice governors ===
- Rio Grande do Norte:
- São Paulo:

== Events ==
- 20 September - Clube de Regatas Brasil is founded.
- October - Beginning of the Contestado War, a dispute between settlers and landowners.
- 19 December - The Federal University of Paraná is established.
- 29 December - The federal government sends in 200 federal troops to deal with ongoing trouble in the State of Santa Catarina.

== Births ==
- 9 April - Amácio Mazzaropi, actor (died 1981)
- 12 April - Oswaldo Louzada, actor (died 2008)
- 24 April - Aymoré Moreira, footballer (died 1998)
- 13 June - Avelar Brandão Vilela, Archbishop of São Salvador da Bahia (died 1986)
- 25 June - Carvalho Leite, footballer (died 2004)
- 29 July - Max Wolff, sergeant killed in World War II (died 1945)
- 6 August - Adoniran Barbosa, singer and composer (died 1982)
- 10 August - Jorge Amado, writer (died 2001)
- 5 October – João Marinho Neto, Supercentenarian, World’s Oldest living man from 25 November 2024.
- 13 December - Luiz Gonzaga, singer, songwriter, and poet (died 1989)
- 22 December - Alberto Zarzur, footballer (died 1958)

== Deaths ==
- 22 October - José Maria de Santo Agostinho, mystic (born 1889; killed by Brazilian state military and police)

== See also ==
- 1912 in Brazilian football
