= 1874 in Brazil =

Events in the year 1874 in Brazil.

== Incumbents ==
- Monarch: Pedro II
- Prime Minister: Viscount of Rio Branco

== Events ==
- May 24 - Revolt of the Muckers: religious service was held in Ferrabraz, where Jacobina announced the end of the world and ordered the extermination of 16 enemy families
- June 15 - Revolt of the Muckers: massacre of the Kassel family
- June 25 - Revolt of the Muckers: 14 houses of the Muckers' enemies were burned and 10 people were killed, including children
- June 28 - Revolt of the Muckers: police attack Muckers but are defeated
- August 2 - Jacobina Mentz and most of her followers killed by police, who were helped by informant Carlos Luppa. End of the Revolt of the Muckers.
- November - Quebra–Quilos revolt

== Births ==
- July 30 - João de Deus Mena Barreto (1874–1933), a member of the junta that temporarily governed Brazil when Washington Luís was deposed
- November 13 - Vital Soares, lawyer and politician

== Deaths ==
- August 2 - Jacobina Mentz Maurer
