= 1853 in Brazil =

Events in the year 1853 in Brazil.

== Incumbents ==
- Monarch: Pedro II
- Prime Minister:
  - Viscount of Itaboraí (until 6 September)
  - Marquis of Paraná (starting 6 September)

== Events ==
- September 5 – First official rail journey in Brazil, prior before the line was formally opened to the public
