= 1830 in Brazil =

Events in the year 1830 in Brazil.

== Incumbents ==
- Monarch: Pedro I

== Events ==
=== March ===
- March 5: The first issue of the Jornal Matutina Meiapontense circulates. This newspaper has totaled 526 issues, and is considered the oldest in the Central-West region. It was founded by Joaquim Alves de Oliveira in Vila de Meia Ponte (present day Pirenópolis and Father Luís Gonzaga de Camargo Fleury served as its first director.
