= 1834 in Brazil =

Events in the year 1834 in Brazil.

== Incumbents ==
- Monarch: Pedro II

== Events ==
- September 24: Dom Pedro I, first emperor of Brazil, dies at 14:34 in Queluz, Portugal.

== Deaths ==
- September 24: Emperor Pedro I of Brazil, Pedro IV of Portugal (b. 1798)
