= 1877 in Brazil =

Events in the year 1877 in Brazil.

== Incumbents ==
- Monarch – Pedro II
- Prime Minister – Duke of Caxias

== Events ==
- October 30 - Colonel Cândido José dos Santos Brochado is murdered near Freitas by a slave, during a trip to Sabará, in the Province of Minas Gerais.
