= 1826 in Brazil =

Events in the year 1826 in Brazil.

== Incumbents ==
- Monarch – Pedro I

== Events ==
=== May ===
- May 2: D. Pedro I abdicates the Portuguese throne in favor of his daughter Dona Maria II.

== Births ==
- 10 January: Francisco Paulo de Almeida, banker

== Deaths ==
- 11 December: Maria Leopoldina of Austria, first Empress of Brazil
