= 1829 in Brazil =

Events in the year 1829 in Brazil.

== Incumbents ==
- Monarch – Pedro I

== Events ==
- March 18: The Treaty of Amity and Commerce is signed between Brazil and the United States.
- October 17: Dom Pedro I marries Amélie of Leuchtenberg.
- December 2: The first Fine Arts Exhibition is held in Rio de Janeiro.

== Births ==
- 19 April: Qorpo-Santo, playwright
- 1 May: José de Alencar, novelist
