= 1868 in Brazil =

Events in the year 1868 in Brazil.

== Incumbents ==
- Monarch: Pedro II
- Prime Minister:
  - Zacarias de Góis e Vasconcelos (until 16 July)
  - Viscount of Itaboraí (starting 16 July)
