= 1858 in Brazil =

Events in the year 1858 in Brazil.

== Incumbents ==
- Monarch: Pedro II
- Prime Minister:
  - Marquis of Olinda (until 12 December)
  - Viscount of Abaeté (starting 12 December)

== Events ==
- The second and third railroad lines in Brazil begin operation.
