= 1855 in Brazil =

Events in the year 1855 in Brazil.

== Incumbents ==
- Monarch: Pedro II
- Prime Minister: Marquis of Paraná

== Events ==
- Steamship service links Manaus with Nauta, Peru

== Births ==
- 12 May - Hermes da Fonseca
