= 1935 in Brazil =

Events in the year 1935 in Brazil.

== Incumbents ==
=== Federal government ===
- President: Getúlio Vargas
- Vice President: None

=== Governors ===
- Alagoas:
  - till 26 March: Osman Laurel
  - 26 March-10 May: Edgar de Góis Monteiro
  - 10 May-27 May: Benedito Augusto da Silva
  - till 27 May: Osman Laurel
- Amazonas: Nélson de Melo (till 19 February); Álvaro Botelho Maia (from 19 February)
- Bahia: Juracy Magalhães
- Ceará:
  - till 10 May: Filipe Moreira Lima
  - 10 May-25 May: Franklin Monteiro Gondim
  - from 25 May: Francisco de Meneses Pimentel
- Espírito Santo: João Punaro Bley
- Goiás:
  - till 26 September: Pedro Ludovico Teixeira
  - 26 September-20 October: Taciano Gomes de Mello
  - starting 21 October: Pedro Ludovico Teixeira
- Maranhão:
  - till 22 July: Antônio Martins de Almeida
  - from 22 July: Aquiles Lisboa
- Mato Grosso: César de Mesquita Serva then Fenelon Müller then Newton Deschamps Cavalcanti then Mário Correia da Costa
- Minas Gerais: Benedito Valadares Ribeiro
- Pará:
  - till 12 April: Joaquim de Magalhães Barata
  - 12 April-4 May: Roberto Carneiro
  - from 4 May: José Carneiro da Gama Malcher
- Paraíba: José Marques da Silva Mariz (till 21 January); Argemiro de Figueiredo (from 21 January)
- Paraná: Manuel Ribas
- Pernambuco:
  - till 12 October: Carlos de Lima Cavalcanti
  - 12 October-6 December: Antônio Vicente de Andrade Bezerra
  - from 6 December: Carlos de Lima Cavalcanti
- Piauí: Landry Sales (till 3 May); Leônidas Melo (from 3 May)
- Rio Grande do Norte:
  - till 27 October: Mario Leopoldo Pereira da Camera
  - 27 October-29 October: Liberato da Cruz Barroso
  - from 29 October: Rafael Fernandes Gurjão
- Rio Grande do Sul: José Antônio Flores da Cunha
- Santa Catarina: Aristiliano Ramos (till 1 May); Nereu Ramos (from 1 May)
- São Paulo: Armando de Sales Oliveira
- Sergipe:
  - till 28 March: Augusto Maynard Gomes
  - 28 March-2 April: Aristides Napoleão de Carvalho
  - from 2 April: Erônides de Carvalho

=== Vice governors ===
- Rio Grande do Norte: no vice governor
- São Paulo: no vice governor

== Events ==
- 2 February - A trade agreement between the United States and Brazil is signed in Washington, D.C.
- 8 June – The Brazilian Olympic Committee, officially founded in 1914, is recognised and begins activities.
- 20 September – the Farroupilha Revolution centennial fair opens
- November – A Communist insurrection, the "Red Revolt of 35", fails to unseat President Vargas. Olga Benário Prestes and her husband Luís Carlos Prestes are among the conspirators arrested.
- date unknown
  - The chemical company Nitro Química is established.
  - Mário de Andrade and writer and archaeologist Paulo Duarte, who had for many years desired to promote cultural research and activity in the city through a municipal agency, create a unified São Paulo Department of Culture (Departamento de Cultura e Recreação da Prefeitura Municipal de São Paulo), with Andrade as founding director.

== Arts and culture ==
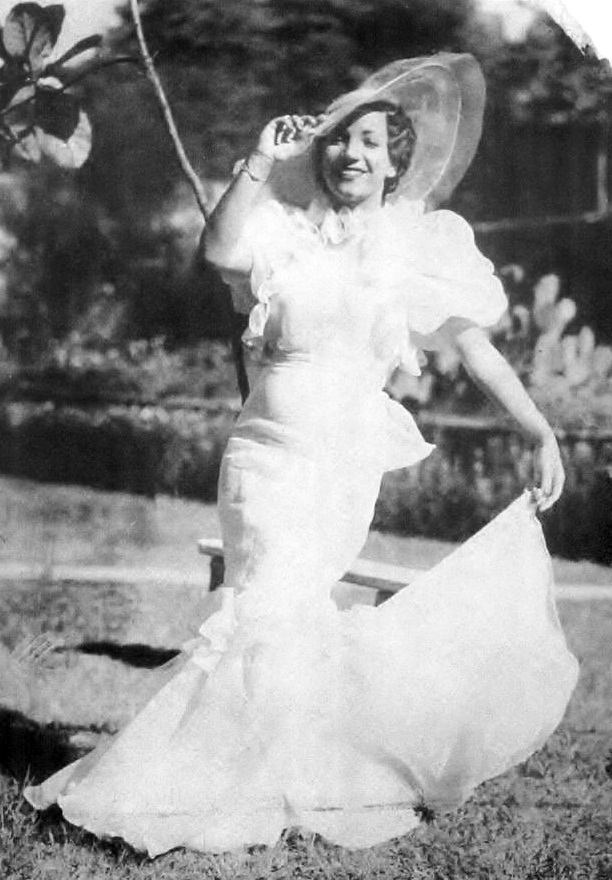
Carmen Miranda in Alô, Alô Brasil.

=== Books ===
- Jorge Amado – Jubiabá
- Tatsuzō Ishikawa – Sōbō
- Érico Veríssimo – A Vida de Joana D'Arc

=== Films ===
- Alô, Alô, Brasil
- Estudantes
- Fazendo Fitas

== Births ==
=== January ===
- 19 January – Maria Alice Vergueiro, actress (d. 2020)

=== July ===
- 1 July – Geraldo Magela, politician
- 14 July – Durval Guimarães, sport shooter

=== August ===
- 1 August – José Hamilton Ribeiro, journalist
- 19 August – Tereza Rachel, actress (d. 2016)

=== October ===
- 5 October – Tarcísio Meira, actor (d. 2021)
- 27 October – Maurício de Sousa, cartoonist
- 31 October – Claudette Soares, singer (d. 2026)

=== December ===
- 13 December – Adélia Prado, poet and author

== Deaths ==
- 8 February – Otávio Fantoni, soccer player (born 1907; infection resulting from a sporting injury)
- 15 February – Ronald de Carvalho, poet and diplomat (born 1893)
- 14 April – Antônio Castilho de Alcântara Machado, journalist, politician and writer (born 1901)
- 24 June – Alfredo Le Pera, journalist, dramatist and lyricist (born 1900)
- date unknown – Arturo Carrari, film director (born 1867)

== See also ==
- 1935 in Brazilian football
- List of Brazilian films of 1935
