= 1883 in Brazil =

Events in the year 1883 in Brazil.

== Incumbents ==
- Monarch: Pedro II
- Prime Minister:
  - Marquis of Paranaguá (until 24 May)
  - Lafayette Rodrigues Pereira (from 24 May)

== Events ==
- January 21 - Elias Augusto da Silva launches the Reformador, a revision of the Federação Espírita Brasileira.
- July 24 - Campos dos Goytacazes, in the province of Rio de Janeiro, is the first city in Brazil to have street lights.
- September 30 - Mossoró, in the province of Rio Grande do Norte, is the first city in Brazil to abolish slavery.

== Births ==
- May 18 - Eurico Gaspar Dutra, minister of war 1936-1945, president 1946-1951
- June 20 - Oliveira Viana, historian and jurist
- October 22 - Abílio Barreto, poet
- November 27 - Belfort Duarte, footballer

== Deaths ==
- April 11 - Arsênio da Silva, painter and photographer
- May 1 - Qorpo-Santo (real name José Joaquim de Campos Leão), journalist and playwright
