= 1861 in Brazil =

Events in the year 1861 in Brazil.

== Incumbents ==
- Monarch: Pedro II
- Prime Minister:
  - Baron of Uruguaiana (until 2 March)
  - Marquis of Caxias (starting 2 March)

== Events ==
- June 7/8 - Shipwreck of the "Prince of Wales" in Rio Grande do Sul.

== Births ==
- 21 January - Roberto Landell de Moura
