= 1967 in Brazil =

Events in the year 1967 in Brazil.

== Incumbents ==
=== Federal government ===
- President:
  - Marshal Castelo Branco (until 14 March)
  - Marshal Artur da Costa e Silva (from 15 March)
- Vice-President:
  - José Maria Alkmin (until 14 March)
  - Pedro Aleixo (from 15 March)

=== Governors ===
- Acre: Vacant
- Alagoas: Antônio Simeão de Lamenha Filho
- Amazonas: Danilo Duarte de Matos Areosa
- Bahia: Lomanto Junior then Luís Viana Filho
- Ceará: Plácido Castelo
- Espírito Santo:
  - Rubens Rangel (until 31 January)
  - Cristiano Dias Lopes Filho (from 31 January)
- Goiás: Otávio Lage
- Guanabara: Francisco Negrão de Lima
- Maranhão: José Sarney
- Mato Grosso: Pedro Pedrossian
- Minas Gerais: Israel Pinheiro da Silva
- Pará: Alacid Nunes
- Paraíba: João Agripino Maia
- Paraná: Pablo Cruz Pimentel
- Pernambuco:
  - Paulo Pessoa Guerra (until 31 January)
  - Nilo Coelho (from 31 January)
- Piauí: Helvídio Nunes
- Rio de Janeiro: Geremias de Mattos Fontes
- Rio Grande do Norte: Walfredo Gurgel Dantas
- Rio Grande do Sul: Walter Peracchi Barcelos
- Santa Catarina: Ivo Silveira
- São Paulo: Roberto Costa de Abreu Sodré
- Sergipe: Lourival Baptista

=== Vice governors ===
- Alagoas: Manoel Sampaio Luz
- Amazonas: Rui Arajuo (from 31 January)
- Bahia:
  - Orlando Moscoso (until 15 March)
  - Jutahy Magalhães (from 15 March)
- Ceará: Humberto Ellery
- Espírito Santo: Isaac Lopes Rubim
- Goiás: Osires Teixeira
- Maranhão: Antonio Jorge Dino
- Mato Grosso: Lenine de Campos Póvoas
- Minas Gerais: Pio Soares Canedo
- Pará: João Renato Franco
- Paraíba: Antônio Juarez Farias
- Paraná: Plínio Franco Ferreira da Costa
- Pernambuco: Salviano Machado Filho
- Piauí: João Clímaco d'Almeida
- Rio de Janeiro: Heli Ribeiro Gomes
- Rio Grande do Norte: Clóvis Motta
- Santa Catarina: Jorge Bornhausen (from 9 March)
- São Paulo: Hilário Torloni
- Sergipe: Vacant

== Events ==
=== January ===
- 18 January: The National Congress of Brazil rejects an amendment that would restore direct elections for President and Vice President of the Republic.
- 24 January: President Humberto de Alencar Castelo Branco promulgates the Sixth Brazilian Constitution, which replaces the Fifth Constitution.
- 26 January: President-elect Artur da Costa e Silva visits U.S. president Lyndon Johnson at the White House.

=== February ===
- 9 February: President Humberto de Alencar Castelo Branco signs the Press Law, where news, radio, and television stations are heavily regulated.
- 13 February: The Cruzeiro Novo, equivalent to one thousand old Cruzeiros, begins to circulate.

=== March ===
- 1 March: Police arrest Franz Stangl, ex-commander of Treblinka and Sobibór extermination camps.
- 15 March: Marshal Artur da Costa e Silva is sworn in as the 27th President of Brazil.
- 18 March: Floods and landslides hit Caraguatatuba, São Paulo.

=== July ===
- 18 July: Former President of Brazil, Humberto de Alencar Castelo Branco, dies in a plane crash in Fortaleza, Ceará.

=== September ===
- 6-13 September: King Olav V of Norway visits Brazil.
- September-October: A large fire hits the Rio Doce State Park in Minas Gerais. Around 9,000 hectares (approximately one third of the reserve) were consumed by fire and 12 people died. This would be the second largest forest fire in Brazil in terms of number of fatalities; second only to the fire in Paraná in 1963, which left 110 dead.

=== December ===
- 5 December: The National Indigenous People Foundation (FUNAI) is created.

== Births ==
=== January ===
- 8 January: Guilherme Fontes, actor

=== March ===
- 6 March: Sérgio Pereira Couto, Portuguese-Brazilian writer

=== July ===
- 1 July: Marisa Monte, singer

=== August ===
- 1 August: José Padilha, film director, producer and screenwriter

=== September ===
- September 28: Roberto Santucci, filmmaker

=== November ===
- 5 November: Marcelo D2, rapper
- 13 November:
  - Vitor Negrete, mountaineer (died 2006)
  - Ricardo Nunes, politician

=== December ===
- 14 December: Palhinha, footballer

== Deaths ==
=== February ===
- 26 February: Octacílio, footballer (born 1909)

=== July ===
- 18 July: Humberto de Alencar Castelo Branco, first president during the Brazilian military dictatorship (born 1897)
- 19 July: Luz del Fuego, ballerina, naturist and feminist (born 1917 as Dora Vivacqua)

=== November ===
- 19 November: João Guimarães Rosa, novelist (born 1908)

== See also ==
- 1967 in Brazilian football
- 1967 in Brazilian television
