= 1974 in Brazil =

Events in the year 1974 in Brazil.

== Incumbents ==
=== Federal government ===
- President:
  - General Emílio Garrastazu Médici (until 14 March)
  - General Ernesto Geisel (starting 15 March)
- Vice President:
  - General Augusto Rademaker (until 14 March)
  - General Adalberto Pereira dos Santos (starting 15 March)

=== Governors ===
- Acre: Vacant
- Alagoas: Afrânio Lages
- Amazonas: João Walter de Andrade
- Bahia: Antônio Carlos Magalhães
- Ceará: César Cals
- Espírito Santo: Artur Carlos Gerhardt Santos
- Goiás: Leonino Caiado
- Guanabara: Antonio de Pádua Chagas Freitas
- Maranhão: Pedro Neiva de Santana
- Mato Grosso: José Fragelli
- Minas Gerais: Rondon Pacheco
- Pará: Fernando Guilhon
- Paraíba: Ernâni Sátiro
- Paraná: Emílio Hoffmann Gomes
- Pernambuco: Eraldo Gueiros
- Piauí: Alberto Silva
- Rio de Janeiro: Raimundo Padhila
- Rio Grande do Norte: Jose Pereira de Araújo Cortez
- Rio Grande do Sul: Euclides Triches
- Santa Catarina: Colombo Salles
- São Paulo: Laudo Natel
- Sergipe: Paulo Barreto de Menezes

=== Vice governors ===
- Acre: Alberto Barbosa da Costa
- Alagoas: José de Medeiros Tavares
- Amazonas: Deoclides de Carvalho Leal
- Bahia: Menandro Minahim
- Ceará: Francisco Humberto Bezerra
- Espírito Santo: Henrique Pretti
- Goiás: Ursulino Tavares Leão
- Maranhão: Alexandre Sá Colares Moreira
- Mato Grosso: José Monteiro de Figueiredo
- Minas Gerais: Celso Porfírio de Araújo Machado
- Pará: Newton Burlamaqui Barreira
- Paraíba: Clóvis Bezerra Cavalcanti
- Paraná: Jaime Canet Júnior
- Pernambuco: José Antônio Barreto Guimarães
- Piauí: Sebastião Rocha Leal
- Rio de Janeiro: Teotônio Araújo
- Rio Grande do Norte: Tertius Rebelo
- Rio Grande do Sul: Edmar Fetter
- Santa Catarina: Atílio Francisco Xavier Fontana
- São Paulo: Antonio José Rodrigues Filho
- Sergipe: Adalberto Moura

== Establishments ==
- Construction of the Basilica of the Eternal Father, Trindade was completed.

== Events ==
=== January ===
- 15 January: General Ernesto Geisel is elected President of Brazil by the electoral college in an indirect presidential election. Geisel obtains 400 votes against 76 given to the opposition candidate, Ulysses Guimarães.

=== February ===
- 1 February: A fire at the Joelma Building in São Paulo kills 177 people and injures 293; 11 die later of their injuries.

=== March ===
- 4 March: President Emílio Garrastazu Médici officially opens up the Rio-Niterói Bridge, located in Guanabara Bay, Rio de Janeiro.
- 15 March: General Ernesto Geisel replaces General Emílio Garrastazu Médici and becomes the 29th President of Brazil.
- 24-27 March: The Tubarão River waters flood about 80% of the urban area in Tubarão, Santa Catarina. The flood causes 199 fatalities and leaves about 45,000 people homeless.

=== May ===
- 17 May: Presidents Ernesto Geisel of Brazil and Alfredo Stroessner of Paraguay create Itaipu Binacional to manage the construction of the power plant.
- 31 May: Former Portuguese Prime Minister Marcelo Caetano is granted political asylum by President Ernesto Geisel in Brazil. Caetano fled after Portugal's Carnation Revolution, which ended 41 years of the Estado Novo dictatorship.

=== July ===
- 1 July: President Ernesto Geisel signs a law that determines the union of the states of Guanabara and Rio de Janeiro.
- 29 July: A collision between a bus carrying 90 passengers and a truck kills 69 people and injures 11 on the Belém-Brasília highway.

== Births ==
=== January ===
- 9 January: Sávio, footballer
- 16 January: Tatiana Issa, director and producer

=== March ===
- 13 March: Vampeta, footballer and pundit
- 27 March: Fernando Diniz, coach and retired footballer

=== April ===
- 12 April: Sylvinho, footballer and manager

=== May ===
- 3 May: Pedro Rizzo, mixed martial arts fighter

=== July ===
- 5 July: Márcio Amoroso, footballer

=== December ===
- 31 December: Tony Kanaan, racecar driver

== Deaths ==
=== January ===
- 14 January: Cassiano Ricardo, journalist and poet (b. 1894)
- 16 January: Aldo Bonadei, painter (b. 1906)

=== July ===
- 16 July: Oduvaldo Vianna Filho, playwright (b. 1936)

== See also ==
- 1974 in Brazilian football
- 1974 in Brazilian television
