= 1962 in Brazil =

Events in the year 1962 in Brazil.

== Incumbents ==
=== Federal government ===
- President: João Goulart
- Prime Minister:
  - Tancredo Neves (until 12 July)
  - Francisco de Paula Brochado da Rocha (from 12 July to 18 September)
  - Hermes Lima (starting 18 September)
- Vice President: Vacant

=== Governors ===
- Alagoas: Luis Cavalcante
- Amazonas: Gilberto Mestrinho
- Bahia: Juracy Magalhães
- Ceará: Parsifal Barroso
- Espírito Santo:
  - Raul Giuberti (until 6 July)
  - Hélsio Pinheiro Cordeiro (6 July-5 August)
  - Asdrúbal Martins Soares (from 5 August)
- Goiás: Mauro Borges
- Guanabara: Carlos Lacerda
- Maranhão: Newton de Barros Belo
- Mato Grosso: Fernando Corrêa da Costa
- Minas Gerais: José de Magalhães Pinto
- Pará: Aurélio do Carmo
- Paraíba: Pedro Gondim
- Paraná: Nei Braga
- Pernambuco: Cid Sampaio
- Piauí:
  - Chagas Rodrigues (until 3 July)
  - Tibério Nunes (from 3 July)
- Rio de Janeiro:
  - Celso Peçanha (until 7 July)
  - José Janotti (from 7 July)
- Rio Grande do Norte: Aluízio Alves
- Rio Grande do Sul: Leonel Brizola
- Santa Catarina: Celso Ramos
- São Paulo: Carlos Alberto Alves de Carvalho Pinto
- Sergipe:
  - Luís Garcia (until 6 July)
  - Dionísio Machado (from 6 July)

=== Vice governors ===
- Alagoas: Teotônio Brandão Vilela
- Bahia: Orlando Moscoso
- Ceará: Wilson Gonçalves
- Espírito Santo:
  - Raul Giuberti (until 6 July)
  - Vacant thereafter (from 6 July)
- Goiás: Antônio Rezende Monteiro
- Maranhão: Alfredo Salim Duailibe
- Mato Grosso: Jose Garcia Neto
- Minas Gerais: Clóvis Salgado da Gama
- Pará: Newton Burlamaqui de Miranda
- Paraíba: André Avelino de Paiva Gadelha
- Pernambuco: Pelópidas da Silveira
- Piauí:
  - Tibério Nunes (until 6 July)
  - Vacant thereafter (from 6 July)
- Rio de Janeiro: Vacant
- Rio Grande do Norte:
  - Walfredo Gurgel (until 31 January)
  - Vacant thereafter (from 31 January)
- Santa Catarina: Armindo Marcílio Doutel de Andrade
- São Paulo: Porfírio da Paz
- Sergipe:
  - Dionísio Machado (until 6 July)
  - Vacant thereafter (from 6 July)

== Events ==
=== April ===
- April 4: Brazilian President João Goulart is received by US President John F. Kennedy at the White House in Washington, DC.
- April 21: The University of Brasília is established.

=== May ===
- May 23: O Pagador de Promessas is the first Brazilian film to win the Palme d'Or at the Cannes Film Festival, in France.

=== June ===
- June 15: The territory of Acre becomes the country's 22nd state. A star representing Acre would be added to the flag of Brazil six years later.
- June 17: Brazil defeats Czechoslovakia 3–1 to win the 1962 FIFA World Cup Final in Chile. Brazil wins its second FIFA World Cup.

=== July ===
- July 13: President João Goulart signs a law establishing the 13th salary.

=== October ===
- October 11: Santos FC wins its first Intercontinental Cup after beating Portuguese club Benfica 5-2 at Estádio da Luz in Lisbon, as well as the first Brazilian club to win the championship.

== Births ==
=== January ===
- 4 January: Norton Nascimento, actor (died 2007)

=== February ===
- 13 February: Jackie Silva, volleyball player

=== April ===
- 19 April: Eduardo Galvão, actor (died 2020)

=== October ===
- 31 October: Raphael Rabello, guitarist (died 1995)

=== December ===
- 31 December: Pedro Cardoso, actor

== Deaths ==
=== February ===
- 6 February: Candido Portinari, painter (born 1903)

=== August ===
- 29 August: Georgina de Albuquerque, painter (born 1885)

=== September ===
- 26 September: Francisco de Paula Brochado da Rocha, Prime Minister of Brazil (born 1910)

== See also ==
- 1962 in Brazilian television
