= 1820 in Brazil =

Events in the year 1820 in Brazil.

== Incumbents ==
- Monarch – King John VI of Portugal

== Events ==
- After the Liberal Revolution of 1820, the Portuguese court returns from Brazil to Portugal.
