= 1876 in Brazil =

Events in the year 1876 in Brazil.

== Incumbents ==
- Monarch – Pedro II
- Prime Minister – Duke of Caxias

== Events ==
28 April - Francisco, a slave, becomes the last person to be executed in Brazil, after murdering his masters, being hanged in Pilar, Alagoas.
