= 1860 in Brazil =

Events in the year 1860 in Brazil.

== Incumbents ==
- Monarch: Pedro II
- Prime Minister: Baron of Uruguaiana

== Births ==
- 29 June – Júlio de Castilhos (died 1903)
