= 1818 in Brazil =

Events in the year 1818 in Brazil.

== Incumbents ==
- Monarch – King John VI of Portugal
