= 1835 in Brazil =

Events in the year 1835 in Brazil.

== Incumbents ==
- Monarch: Pedro II

== Events ==
=== January ===
- January 6 - Cabanagem: rebels attack and conquer the city of Belém, assassinating the president Sousa Lobo and the Army Commander, and acquiring a large quantity of munitions.
- January 7 - Cabanagem: Clement Malcher was released and was chosen as president of the province, with Francisco Vinagre as the Army Commander
- January 24-25: The Muslim slave revolt, known as the Malê Revolt, takes place in Salvador, capital of the Province of Bahia.

=== April ===
- April 7: Diogo Feijó wins the election as Regent of Brazil by just a difference of approximately 600 votes.

=== September ===
- 19 September - Battle of Azenha Bridge
- 20 September - outbreak of the Ragamuffin War

== Births ==
- May 23: José Alves de Cerqueira César, politician

== Deaths ==
- February 20: Clemente Malcher, rebel leader (assassinated)
