= 1836 in Brazil =

Events in the year 1836 in Brazil.

== Incumbents ==
- Monarch: Pedro II
