= 1817 in Brazil =

Events in the year 1817 in Brazil.

== Incumbents ==
- Monarch – King John VI of Portugal

== Births ==
- 24 October - José Luís Mena Barreto (d. 1879)
