= 1957 in Brazil =

Events in the year 1957 in Brazil.

== Incumbents ==
=== Federal government ===
- President: Juscelino Kubitschek
- Vice President: João Goulart

=== Governors ===
- Alagoas:
  - Sebastião Muniz Falcão (until 15 September)
  - Sizenando Nabuco de Melo (from 15 September)
- Amazonas: Plínio Ramos Coelho
- Bahia: Antônio Balbino
- Ceará: Paulo Sarasate
- Espírito Santo: Francisco Lacerda de Aguiar
- Goiás: José Ludovico de Almeida
- Maranhão:
  - Eurico Ribeiro (until 9 July)
  - José de Matos Carvalho (from 9 July)
- Mato Grosso: João Ponce de Arruda
- Minas Gerais: José Francisco Bias Fortes
- Pará: Magalhães Barata
- Paraíba: Flávio Coutinho
- Paraná: Moisés Lupion
- Pernambuco: Osvaldo Cordeiro de Farias
- Piauí: Jacob Gaioso e Almendra
- Rio de Janeiro: Miguel Couto Filho
- Rio Grande do Norte: Dinarte de Medeiros Mariz
- Rio Grande do Sul: Ildo Meneghetti
- Santa Catarina: Jorge Lacerda
- São Paulo: Jânio Quadros
- Sergipe: Leandro Maciel

=== Vice governors ===
- Alagoas: Sizenando Nabuco de Melo
- Ceará: Wilson Gonçalves
- Espírito Santo: Adwalter Ribeiro Soares
- Goiás: Bernardo Sayão Carvalho Araújo
- Maranhão: Alexandre Alves Costa (from 9 July)
- Mato Grosso: Henrique José Vieira Neto
- Minas Gerais: Artur Bernardes Filho
- Paraíba: Pedro Gondim
- Pernambuco: Otávio Correia de Araújo (from 23 May)
- Piauí: Francisco Ferreira de Castro
- Rio de Janeiro: Roberto Silveira
- Rio Grande do Norte: José Augusto Varela
- Santa Catarina: Heriberto Hülse
- São Paulo: Porfírio da Paz
- Sergipe: José Machado de Souza

== Events ==
=== January ===
- January 26: The Ibirapuera Planetarium in São Paulo opens to the public. It is the first planetarium in the Southern Hemisphere.

=== March ===
- March 16: Rede Ferroviária Federal, a public company responsible for the operation of 19 unified railways, is created by Federal Law n° 3,115.

=== April ===
- April 7: A Varig aircraft crashes near Bagé airport, in Rio Grande do Sul, after suffering a fire on board. All 40 occupants on board lose their lives.
- April 10: After suffering a breakdown in one of its engines, a Real Douglas DC-3 crashes into the slopes of Pico do Papagaio on Anchieta Island. Of the 30 passengers and crew aboard, 27 are killed.

=== October ===
- October 1: President Juscelino Kubitschek ratifies a law that sets the date for moving the new federal capital to Brasília.
- October 16: Farmer Antônio Vilas Boas claims to have been abducted by extraterrestrials. This would become one of the earliest recorded alien abduction cases.

=== November ===
- November 4: An alleged extraterrestrial attack on two sentries at the Itaipu Fort takes place in Praia Grande, São Paulo. The entire electricity of the fort, including the emergency circuits, went down during the incident. Afterwards, Brazilian Army and United States Air Force (USAF) personnel, along with investigators of the Brazilian Air Force, flew to the fort to interview the soldiers.

== Births ==
=== January ===
- January 11: Reinaldo, footballer

=== May ===
- May 21: Ana Maria Rangel, political scientist

=== June ===
- June 6: Fábio Barreto, filmmaker, actor, screenwriter, and film producer (d. 2019)
- June 7: Otávio Frias Filho, journalist (d. 2018)
- June 12: Ciro Pessoa, musician (Titãs, Cabine C), journalist, screenwriter and poet (d. 2020)

=== August ===
- August 23: Antônio Meneses, cellist (d. 2024)

== Deaths ==
=== January ===
- January 26: José Linhares, 15th President of Brazil (b. 1886)

=== August ===
- August 4: Washington Luis, 13th President of Brazil (b. 1869)

== See also ==
- 1957 in Brazilian football
- 1957 in Brazilian television
