= 1854 in Brazil =

Events in the year 1854 in Brazil.

== Incumbents ==
- Monarch: Pedro II
- Prime Minister: Marquis of Paraná

== Events ==
- Formation of the Maua, McGregor and Company Bank in Rio de Janeiro

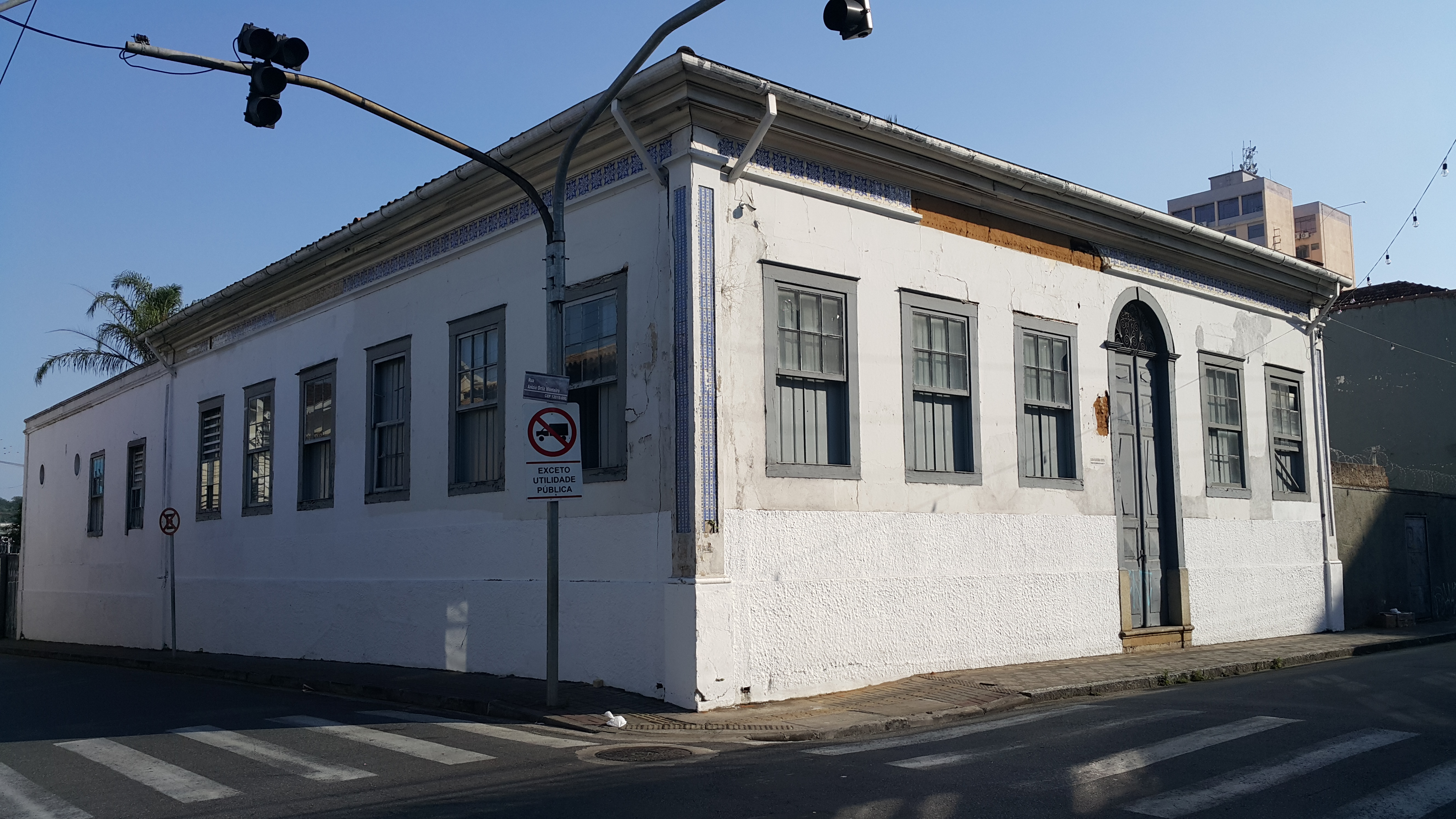
Casa de Oliveira Costa, a house built in 1854, located in Taubaté.
