= 1823 in Brazil =

Events in the year 1823 in Brazil.

== Incumbents ==
- Monarch: Pedro I

== Events ==
=== March ===
- March 13: The Battle of Jenipapo took place, where Brazilian patriots were defeated by Portuguese troops in Piauí during the Brazilian War of Independence.

=== July ===
- July 2: Portuguese troops surrender to Brazilians in Bahia.

=== November ===
- November 12: Pedro I of Brazil closes the Constituent Assembly.

== Births ==
=== February ===
- 17 February: Princess Paula of Brazil, princess of the Empire of Brazil

=== May ===
- 1 May: José Antônio Saraiva, politician and diplomat

=== August ===
- 10 August: Gonçalves Dias, poet
