= 1885 in Brazil =

Events in the year 1885 in Brazil.

== Incumbents ==
- Monarch: Pedro II
- Prime Minister:
  - Manuel Pinto de Sousa Dantas (until 6 May)
  - José Antônio Saraiva (from 6 May to 20 August)
  - Baron of Cotegipe (starting 20 August)

== Events ==
- September 28: The Saraiva-Cotegipe Law, also known as the Sexagenarian Law, is enacted, which frees slaves 60 years of age and older in the country.
