= 1859 in Brazil =

Events in the year 1859 in Brazil.

== Incumbents ==
- Monarch: Pedro II
- Prime Minister:
  - Viscount of Abaeté (until 10 August)
  - Baron of Uruguaiana (starting 10 August)
