= 1831 in Brazil =

Events in the year 1831 in Brazil.

== Incumbents ==
- Monarch:
- Pedro I (until April 7)
- Pedro II (starting April 7)

== Events ==
=== March ===
- March 13-15: Night of the Bottle Fight – A street fight between the Portuguese and the Brazilians.

=== May ===
- May 2: Emperor Pedro I abdicates from his post, leaving the throne for his 5-year-old son Pedro II. Since Pedro II was a minor, the country entered a regency period until he reached the age of 15 in 1840.
