= 1884 in Brazil =

Events in the year 1884 in Brazil.

== Incumbents ==
- Monarch – Pedro II
- Prime Minister –
  - Lafayette Rodrigues Pereira (until 6 June)
  - Manuel Pinto de Sousa Dantas (starting 6 June)

== Events ==
- January 2: The Brazilian Spiritist Federation is founded in Rio de Janeiro.
- March 25: Ceará is the first Brazilian state to abolish slavery.

== Births ==
- 1 January - Bertoldo Klinger
