= 1843 in Brazil =

Events in the year 1843 in Brazil.

== Incumbents ==
Monarch: Pedro II

== Events ==
Brazil starts to produce national postage stamps

== Births ==
- 26 May - Artur Silveira da Mota
