= 1815 in Brazil =

Events in the year 1815 in Brazil.

== Incumbents ==
- Monarch – Queen Mary I of Portugal (starting 16 December)

== Events ==
- The United Kingdom of Portugal, Brazil and the Algarves is established under Queen Mary I. Brazil is elevated from the status of Portuguese colony to a constituent country of the united kingdom.
