= 1869 in Brazil =

Events in the year 1869 in Brazil.

== Incumbents ==
- Monarch: Pedro II
- Prime Minister: Viscount of Itaboraí
