= 1878 in Brazil =

Events in the year 1878 in Brazil.

== Incumbents ==
- Monarch: Pedro II
- Prime Minister:
  - Duke of Caxias (until 5 January)
  - Viscount of Sinimbu (starting 5 January)
