= 1827 in Brazil =

Events in the year 1827 in Brazil.

== Incumbents ==
- Monarch – Pedro I

== Births ==
- 5 August: Deodoro da Fonseca, first President of Brazil and military officer (died 1892)
