= 1832 in Brazil =

Events in the year 1832 in Brazil.

== Incumbents ==
- Monarch: Pedro II

== Events ==
- January 2: Joaquim Pinto Madeira starts a movement in Ceará, known as the Crato Insurrection, in order to restore Emperor Pedro I back to power.
- July 14: Oliveira is elevated to the status of parish.

== Births ==
- 20 July: Henrique Dumont
- 31 December: Junqueira Freire
