= 1845 in Brazil =

Events in the year 1845 in Brazil.

== Incumbents ==
- Monarch: Pedro II

== Events ==
- March 1 - Ragamuffin War: peace negotiations led by Luis Alves de Lima e Silva and Antônio Vicente da Fontoura concluded with the signing of the Ponche Verde Treaty between rebels and imperial government, in Dom Pedrito. The treaty offered the rebels a full amnesty, full incorporation into the imperial army and the choice of the next provincial president. All the debts of the Riograndense Republic were paid off by the Empire of Brazil and a tariff of 25% was introduced on imported charque. The Treaty did not state clearly whether the Riograndense and Juliana republics remained independent, but they remained in the Empire of Brazil

== Births ==
- 26 January - Júlio César de Noronha
- Prince Luigi, Count of Roccaguglielma, son of Princess Januária of Brazil
