= 1857 in Brazil =

Events in the year 1857 in Brazil.

== Incumbents ==
- Monarch: Pedro II
- Prime Minister:
  - Marquis of Caxias (until 4 May)
  - Marquis of Olinda (starting 4 May)

== Events ==
- Establishment of banks including the Commercial and Agricultural Bank of Rio de Janeiro; the Bank of the Province of Rio Grande do Sul; the New Bank of Pernambuco, the Savings Bank of Pernambuco,;and the Bank of Maranhao

== Births ==
=== October ===
October 4: Francisco de Assis Rosa e Silva, 3rd Vice President of Brazil (d. 1929)
