= Péricles Azambuja =

Brazilian journalist and historian (1927–2012)

- Born: August 13, 1927
- Died: November 13, 2012 (aged 85)
- Occupation: Historian
- Writing career
- Language: Portuguese

Péricles Azambuja (August 13, 1927 – November 8, 2012) was a Brazilian historian, writer and journalist. He was a specialist in and published many books related to the history of southern Brazil and southern South America and Antarctica, including História das Terras e Mares do Chuí (1978), a history of Chuí. He documented much about Gaucho history in Brazil and has also written books on Antarctica and the southern islands such as "Antártida: Derecho que Tiene Brasil, (1981), Antártida História e Geopolítica (1982) and Falkland ou Malvinas: o arquipélago contestado (1988). He is cited as amongst the most important geopolitical writers about Antarctica. In 2001 he published Prefeitura de S. Vitória do Palmar, sua terra, Tahim, a última divisa, a study of the socioeconomic conditions of southern Brazil. Azambuja has been a member of the Association Press Riograndense, Circle of Literary Research of the Brazilian Academy of History, the Brazilian Association of Culture and the Brazilian Institute of Antarctic Studies as a member of the Supreme Council.
