= 1864 in Brazil =

Events in the year 1864 in Brazil.

== Incumbents ==
- Monarch: Pedro II
- Prime Minister:
  - Marquis of Olinda (until 15 January)
  - Zacarias de Góis e Vasconcelos (from 15 January to 21 August)
  - Francisco José Furtado (starting 31 August)
