= 1851 in Brazil =

Events in the year 1851 in Brazil.

== Incumbents ==
- Monarch: Pedro II
- Prime Minister: Marquis of Monte Alegre

== Births ==
- 28 July – Manuel Raimundo Querino
