= 1842 in Brazil =

Events in the year 1842 in Brazil.

== Incumbents ==
Monarch: Pedro II
