= 1850 in Brazil =

Events in the year 1850 in Brazil.

== Incumbents ==
- Monarch – Pedro II
- Prime Minister – Marquis of Monte Alegre

== Events ==
- September 4: Law n° 581, known as the Eusébio de Queirós Law, is passed, which extinguishes the African slave trade to Brazil.

== Births ==
- January 17: Joaquim Arcoverde, cardinal
