= 1822 in Brazil =

Events in the year 1822 in Brazil.

== Incumbents ==
- King: John VI (until 7 September)
- Emperor: Pedro I (starting 12 October)

== Events ==
- Dissolution of the United Kingdom of Portugal, Brazil and the Algarves
- Establishment of the Empire of Brazil

=== January ===
- 9 January: D. Pedro I refuses to heed the order of the Cortes of Lisbon to return to Portugal, initiating the process of Brazilian independence. The date became known as Dia do Fico.
- 16 January: Dom Pedro I organizes a ministry formed by only Brazilians, under the leadership of José Bonifácio.
- 19 January: José Bonifácio is appointed as Brazilian chancellor.

=== February ===
- 19 February: Insurrection for Brazilian independence in Bahia, where nun Joana Angélica is killed.

=== March ===
- 2 March: The start of the Siege of Salvador, where the newly formed Brazilian army would attempt to capture the city of Salvador in Bahia from its Portuguese defenders.

=== May ===
- 13 May: D. Pedro I is acclaimed Perpetual Defender of Brazil by Freemasonry.

=== June ===
- 14 June: The Minutes of the Council are signed in Santo Amaro, Bahia. It is the first document to officially express the desire for Brazil's independence.

=== September ===
- 7 September: Brazil declares independence from Portugal.

=== October ===
- 25 October: D. Pedro cuts relations with Freemasonry and tries to dissolve it.

=== November ===
- 8 November: The Battle of Pirajá. It was the largest engagement in the fight for the independence of Bahia, involving approximately 10,000 troops.

== Deaths ==
- 19 February: Joana Angélica, conceptionist nun
- 23 December: Frei Galvão, friar of the Franciscan Order
