= 1847 in Brazil =

Events in the year 1847 in Brazil.

== Incumbents ==
- Monarch: Pedro II
- Prime Minister: 2nd Viscount of Caravelas (starting 22 August)

== Births ==
- 14 March - Castro Alves
- 13 July - Princess Leopoldina of Brazil, daughter of Emperor Pedro II
- 2 September - José Carlos de Carvalho Júnior
- 30 November - Afonso Pena
