= 1841 in Brazil =

Events in the year 1841 in Brazil.

== Incumbents ==
Monarch: Pedro II

== Births ==
- 15 February - Campos Sales
- 17 August - Fagundes Varela
- 4 October - Prudente de Morais
