= 1846 in Brazil =

Events in the year 1846 in Brazil.

== Incumbents ==
- Monarch: Pedro II

== Births ==
- July 29 - Isabel, Princess Imperial of Brazil.
