= Zacarias de Góis e Vasconcelos =

Brazilian politician and monarchist

- Góis e Vasconcelos, c. 1866

Prime Minister of Brazil
- In office 3 August 1866 – 16 July 1868
- Monarch: Pedro II
- Preceded by: Marquis of Olinda
- Succeeded by: Viscount of Itaboraí
- In office 15 January 1864 – 31 August 1864
- Monarch: Pedro II
- Preceded by: Marquis of Olinda
- Succeeded by: Francisco José Furtado
- In office 24 May 1862 – 30 May 1862
- Monarch: Pedro II
- Preceded by: Duke of Caxias
- Succeeded by: Marquis of Olinda
Executive offices
President of Piauí
In office 28 June 1845 – 7 September 1847
Preceded by	Francisco Xavier Cerqueira (acting)
Succeeded by	Marco Antônio de Macedo

Personal details
- Born: 5 November 1815 Valença, Bahia, Kingdom of Brazil
- Died: 29 December 1877 (aged 62) Rio de Janeiro, Empire of Brazil
- Party: Liberal; Progressive League
- Occupation: Politician

Zacarias de Góis e Vasconcelos (Note: In the old spelling: Zacharias de Góes e Vasconcellos, Santos 2022, p. 11.) (5 November 1815 – 28 December 1877) was a Brazilian jurist and politician during the period of the Empire of Brazil (1822–1889). He served as Prime Minister of Brazil three times.

Zacarias served as president (governor) of the provinces of Piauí, Sergipe, and Paraná (being the first president of the latter). He was a provincial deputy for Bahia in 1843—re-elected in 1845 and 1847—and served as president of the Chamber of Deputies for Paraná in 1864. He was also a general deputy, a senator of the Empire representing Bahia (from 1864 to 1877), Minister of the Navy in the cabinet of Prime Minister Joaquim José Rodrigues Torres, Minister of Justice, Minister of Finance, and three-time Prime Minister of Brazil. He participated in the founding of the Progressive League in 1864.

As a political thinker, his most notable work was Da natureza e limites do Poder Moderador ("On the Nature and Limits of the Moderating Power"), in which he analyzed the Moderating Power—a unique constitutional prerogative of the Emperor of Brazil—arguing that its scope should be curtailed. Originally published in 1860 and reissued in 1862, the book appeared during the height of Emperor Pedro II's popularity. It sparked controversy due to its progressive stance for the time, as it advocated for a reduction in the monarch's authority in favor of a stronger parliamentary system.

During his tenure as president of the newly created province of Paraná, he established the Legislative Assembly, inaugurated the seat of government, and commissioned the construction of the Graciosa Road, among other significant initiatives undertaken during his administration.

== Early life and education ==
Born on 5 November 1815 in Valença—in the old Captaincy of São Jorge de Ilhéus—Zacarias de Góis e Vasconcelos was the fourth child of Antônio Bernardo de Vasconcelos and Maria Benedita de Assunção Menezes e Vasconcelos, descending from Portuguese settlers who colonized the region. The couple raised a large family, which was supported by Antônio Bernado, who served as the town's military captain. Zacarias' father was also involved in the timber extraction and supply business—providing wood to the Navy Arsenal—which enabled him to build a sobrado in the center of Valença, where Zacarias spent most of his childhood and youth alongside his siblings. His father's business dealings ensured a comfortable life for Zacarias and brought prominence to the family.

Once Brazil's independence process had begun, Zacarias' father—a supporter of Prince Pedro de Alcântara—became involved in the campaign against the Portuguese troops sent to Bahia under the command of Brigadier Inácio Luís Madeira de Melo. Valença joined forces with the towns of Cachoeira, Maragogipe, and other villages at the Recôncavo to provide both provisions and men to fight the Portuguese naval squadron. Antônio Bernardo distinguished himself during the military campaign—earning prestige and political advancement for his family—but passed away prematurely in 1825. The family's eldest son, João Antônio de Vasconcelos, then 22 years old, had attained the position of town councilor and took it upon himself to invest a portion of the family's income into the education of his younger brothers. João Antônio saw potential in Zacarias for a career in law and politics; he himself aspired to study law at the University of Coimbra, for which he was preparing to depart. Before leaving, however, he guided Zacarias to complete his studies, enlisting the help of friends in Salvador to assist his brother in this endeavor.

João departed for Coimbra, though he remained in contact with his brother. Zacarias, meanwhile, moved to the capital, Salvador, where he completed his preparatory studies and the necessary bureaucratic procedures to enroll in the law program at the Academy of Legal and Social Sciences of Olinda. The institution, established by an Imperial Decree on 11 August 1827, began its operations the following year. In the years that ensued, it became the primary training ground for the so-called "bachelors of the North"—or "of Recife"—ultimately rivaling Coimbra and the Faculty of Law of São Paulo in the education of the jurists, politicians, and administrators who staffed the government of the Empire of Brazil.

=== At the Law Academy ===
From Salvador, Zacarias moved to Pernambuco in 1833, enrolling at the academy that year. During his 22-day journey to Olinda, he became friends with João Maurício Wanderley, who regarded him as a young man of "lively conversation [...]—intelligent and spontaneous, yet more biting, more mischievous, more critical, and less cheerful." Despite being an introvert, Zacarias came to stand out in his class, as he was a good speaker. With the exception of the library, the academy had modest facilities, and its professors were, for the most part, educated in Europe. One of them, Pedro Autran da Matta Albuquerque—who taught natural law—was a translator of John Stuart Mill and figures from the classical school of economics, such as Jean-Baptiste Say, Thomas Malthus, and David Ricardo; all of which were part of Zacarias' formation.

During his studies, Zacarias was a close friend of Francisco Gonçalves Martins, who served as secretary of the academy—a position in which he prospected individuals to join the Conservative Party. Although invited to do so, Zacarias showed no interest in politics, as his goal was to pursue an academic career. He completed his law degree in 1837, within the standard timeframe. He then returned to his hometown, where he remained for two years before applying for a teaching position at the academy. The selection process took place in 1840, with four candidates in contention. Zacarias was approved unanimously by the examining board; he was only 25 years old at the time. He was subsequently appointed as a substitute professor in May 1841 and took office in June of the same year.

== Political career ==
=== President of Piauí (1845–1847) ===
Yielding to the insistence of his friend Gonçalves Martins, Zacarias joined the Conservative Party in 1842, the year in which he participated in his first election for the Provincial Assembly of Bahia. He was unsuccessful, securing only the position of fifth alternate; however, due to the absence of the other elected representatives in the capital, he was called upon to take office. The legislative session commenced the following year, at which time he reunited with his brother, João Antônio. In this capacity, Zacarias served on the Committees for Civil and Criminal Justice and for Finance. Before his term ended, Zacarias was invited by the liberal João Carlos Pereira de Almeida Torres, then head of the imperial cabinet—an unofficial position that preceded that of prime minister—to take on the role of president (governor) of the province of Piauí.

Zacarias was appointed on 4 April 1845, arriving in Oeiras—the provincial capital—only two months later. He officially took office on 28 June, succeeding Tomás Joaquim Pereira Valente, the Count of Rio Pardo. (Note: The position was then held by Francisco Xavier Cerqueira, the second vice president, who had been serving in an acting capacity since 20 June 1845, Galvão 1894, p. 112.) Since the departure of former president Manoel de Souza Martins, on 30 December 1843, the province had been gripped by an intense political conflict between rival factions, marked by acts of physical violence. Upon taking office, Zacarias presented his government program to the Provincial Assembly, aiming to quell the strife and restore general order. To this end, he sought to rebuild the credibility of provincial institutions—most notably the security forces—as well as public education and healthcare services. The program was well received by the members of the assembly. Zacarias' tenure at the head of the provincial government was peaceful; he succeeded in increasing the number of available school places and improving educational infrastructure, as well as establishing provincial institutions such as the Treasury Department and the Charity Hospital.

In 1846, amid his candidacy for a seat in the Chamber of Deputies representing Piauí in the elections for the 7th legislature, some politicians affiliated with Macaé began calling for Zacarias' dismissal. He failed to get elected, however, and both of the province's seats were won by liberal deputies—which ultimately led to his departure from the provincial government in September 1847. At the same time, he had also run for a seat in the Provincial Assembly of Bahia; he was successful in that bid, returning to his home province.

== Selected publications ==
Zacarias de Góis e Vasconcelos published works on constitutional law and political affairs. His publications include:

- Questão de limites entre a província do Paraná e a de Santa Catarina. [Boundary dispute between the province of Paraná and that of Santa Catarina]. Rio de Janeiro, 1857;
- Da natureza e limites do Poder Moderador. [On the nature and limits of the Moderating Power]. Rio de Janeiro, 1860;
- Programa do Partido Liberal. [Liberal Party Program]. Rio de Janeiro, 1870;
- Srs. Conselheiro Zacarias de Góes e Vasconcellos e Doutor Antonio Ferreira Vianna no julgamento do Exmo. Revmo. Sr. Bispo de Olinda. [Councilor Zacarias de Góes e Vasconcellos and Doctor Antonio Ferreira Vianna in the trial of the Most Excellent and Reverend Bishop of Olinda]. Rio de Janeiro, 1874;
- Reforma eleitoral: discursos proferidos no Senado. [Electoral reform: speeches delivered in the Senate]. Rio de Janeiro, 1876.
