= J. J. Seabra =

Brazilian politician

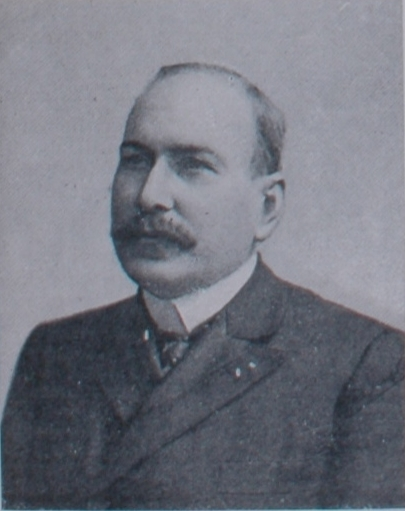
In 1910.

José Joaquim Seabra (August 21, 1855 – December 5, 1942), also known as J. J. Seabra, was a Brazilian politician, jurist, and professor. He governed the state of Bahia from 1912 to 1916 and again from 1920 to 1924. His policies and governing style became known as seabrismo.

He participated in the constitutional assemblies of 1891 and 1934 and served as Minister of Justice under Rodrigues Alves from 1902 to 1906, having also acted as Minister of Foreign Affairs provisionally in 1902.

== Biography ==
=== Early life ===
Born in Salvador into a middle-class family, Seabra was the son of a public officer at the state's custom house. He completed his preparatory studies in his hometown before moving to Recife to enroll at the Faculty of Law of Pernambuco, which lived a period of intellectual flourishment with the Recife School. As a student, he gave private lectures in rhetoric to support himself and wrote for academic magazines. He graduated in 1877, obtaining distinctions in three different years. Among his contemporaries were the future vice-president Rosa e Silva and Pedro Leão Veloso Filho, later the governor of Alagoas.

After returning to Salvador, he was appointed as a public prosecutor by Henrique Pereira de Lucena, Baron of Lucena, a former governor of Bahia. In August 1878, he presented to the Faculty of Law a thesis titled Em que consiste o contencioso administrativo e quais os limites divisórios entre ele e o contencioso judiciário, which earned him the degree of Doctor of Law. In 1880, through public examination, he became professor at his alma mater, where he taught international law and political economy.

=== Career ===
==== Republic of the Sword (1889 - 1894) ====
A skilled orator, Seabra was active in the abolitionist movement, while also maintaining a favorable position towards the Monarchy. As a young lawyer and professor in Recife, he attempted to run for the Conservative Party, with no success. In 1889, campaigning for federalism, he ran as deputy general for Bahia, but was defeated. With the Proclamation of the Republic, Seabra switched his alignment and became a republican. The following year, he was elected to the Chamber of Deputies for Bahia and later became a member of the 1891 Constitutional Assembly, which drafted Brazil's first republican constitution. He supported the authoritarian government of Deodoro da Fonseca and the November 3 coup, through which the President dissolved Congress and arrested political opponents. In February 1891, Seabra was appointed director of the Faculty of Law of Recife by the President, serving until December of the same year.

With Deodoro da Fonseca's resignation and Floriano Peixoto assuming the presidency, Seabra became a vocal opponent of his government and directed criticism to the deputy Francisco Glicério, with whom he developed a fierce political rivalry. Targeted by the florianistas, he was exiled to Cucuí, in Amazonas, where he spent several months until he was amnestied with the help of Ruy Barbosa. He resumed opposition to the government, and in September 1893 supported the unsuccessful naval revolt led by admiral Custódio José de Melo against the government. Seabra was again exiled, this time to Montevideo, where he wrote articles against President Peixoto.

==== First Republic (1894 - 1930) ====
Having returned to Brazil in 1895, he launched another bid for the Chamber of Deputies, in 1897. Francisco Glicério, then the leader of the governist Federal Republican Party, attempted to frustrate the candidacy by persuading Luís Viana and Arthur Rios to act against Seabra. However, through his connections with his uncle Manuel José Alves Barbosa, Minister of the Navy, and Vice President Manuel Vitorino, he secured the nomination and won a seat for Salvador.

He was then invited by Arthur Rios and his old colleague Rosa e Silva to join a conspiracy against Glicério, in a move that would lead to the collapse of the already fragile FRP. The conspirators accused Glicério of sympathizing with a failed military revolt that had broken out at the Military School of Porto Alegre. Seabra presented a motion praising President Prudente de Moraes for repressing the revolt, which was disavowed by Glicério, who was connected with militarist groups sympathetic to the mutiny. This culminated in a rupture between the President and Glicério, whose relations had already been deteriorating.

Arthur Rios, the president of the Chamber of Deputies, resigned from office, prompting the holding of special elections. Unaware that he had lost the President's support, Glicério declared his candidacy expecting his endorsement, but Moraes supported the return of Rios, who ultimately won the election and reclaimed the office.

On November 5, 1897, Prudente de Moraes survived an assassination attempt in which Carlos Machado de Bittencourt, the Minister of War, was stabbed to death while defending the President. Public authorities made use of the situation to investigate political opponents, including Glicério, who was attacked by Seabra in an ardent speech where he accused him of murder. Isolated, Glicério had his mandate invalidated by the Commission of Verification of Powers. Seabra then ascended to the leadership of the government majority in the Chamber of Deputies during the government of Campos Sales.

===== Minister of Justice and Interior =====
On November 15, 1902, Seabra took office as Minister of Justice and Interior under Rodrigues Alves. During his tenure, he assisted in the suppression of the Vaccine Revolt and supported the reconstruction of the Faculty of Medicine of Bahia. He endorsed the appointment of Juliano Moreira as director of the National Hospital for the Insane. He also briefly served as Minister of Foreign Affairs from November 15 to December 3, when José Maria da Silva Paranhos Júnior was on a diplomatic mission in Berlin.

In May 1906, he resigned from office to run for the Senate as a representative of the state of Alagoas, but the Commission of Verification of Powers invalidated his candidacy.

===== Return to the Chamber of Deputies =====
In 1909, Seabra was again elected federal deputy for Bahia. At the time, the state was divided between two political factions: the severinistas, who supported the senator and former governor Severino Vieira, and the marcelinistas, who supported the governor José Marcelino de Sousa, a former ally of Vieira. The severinistas backed the presidential candidacy of Hermes da Fonseca, while the marcelinistas supported Ruy Barbosa.

Having joined the militarist campaign of Hermes da Fonseca, Seabra found himself in an ambiguous position, as he opposed both Severino Vieira and José Marcelino de Sousa. Following Fonseca's victory, he founded the Democratic Republican Party of Bahia, bringing together federal deputy Antônio Muniz Sodré de Aragão, the influential journalist Ernesto Simões Filho, and future governor of Bahia Otávio Mangabeira. He was then appointed Minister of Industry, Transport and Public Works under President Fonseca.

As Minister, he conducted the duplication of the Serra do Mar railway line and promoted the restructuring of the National Department of Works Against Droughts, a federal agency responsible for implementing infrastructural projects to alleviate the social and economic effects of prolonged droughts in Northeastern Brazil. He also worked to accelerate the construction of wharves at the Port of Salvador, whose modernization would later become a central policy of his government.

== Governor of Bahia ==
By the time Seabra announced his candidacy for the government of Bahia, a coalition of marcelinistas and severinistas had been formed, with the support of Ruy Barbosa, to oppose his aspirations. His rival was Domingos Alves Guimarães, whom he was expected to defeat. After the elections, a disoute over the legitimacy of its results ensued, as the assemblies responsible for declaring the outcome—which were largely dominated by Seabra's opponents—challenged his victory.

An institutional crisis followed, with the seabristas claiming the right to form their own assemblies. Pressured by both factions, governor Araújo Pinho resigned from office, transferring power to Aurélio Viana, an old foe of Seabra. In December 1911, advised by Ruy Barbosa, Viana decreed the transfer of the capital of Bahia to Jequié, one of his political strongholds, where he hoped to form a new assembly assigned with recounting the votes. However, many deputies remained in Salvador, which resulted in the coexistence of two legislative assemblies. In January 1912, the seabristas challenged the move in federal court and obtained a favorable ruling ordering the holding of electoral sessions in Salvador.

The situation escalated as Viana mobilized the state police and groups of hired gunmen to enforce his decision. In response, general Sotero de Meneses, commander of the 7th Military Region, issued an ultimatum demanding obedience to the judicial order. After receiving no response, Army artillery bombarded Salvador, damaging the Rio Branco Palace (the seat of the state government), the Public Library of Bahia, as well as the Municipal Chamber. Viana was forced to resign and Bráulio Xavier da Silva Pereira assumed the governorship provisionally. Elections were held on January 28, 1912, and resulted in Seabra's victory.

== Bibliography ==
- Sarmento, Silvia Noronha (2011). A raposa e a águia: J.J. Seabra e Rui Barbosa na política baiana. Salvador: EDUFBA.
- Meireles, Edilton (2012). J. J. Seabra - Sua vida, suas obras. Salvador: Assembleia Legislativa do Estado da Bahia.
