= Borges de Medeiros =

Brazilian lawyer and politician

Borges de Medeiros GOONM
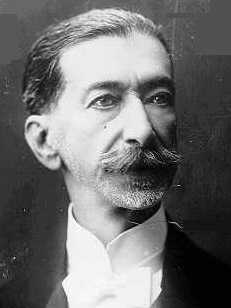

President of Rio Grande do Sul
- In office 25 January 1913 – 25 January 1928
- Preceded by: Carlos Barbosa Gonçalves
- Succeeded by: Getúlio Vargas
- In office 25 January 1898 – 25 January 1908
- Preceded by: Júlio de Castilhos
- Succeeded by: Carlos Barbosa Gonçalves

Member of the Chamber of Deputies
- In office 6 July 1935 – 10 November 1937
- Constituency: Rio Grande do Sul
- In office 15 November 1890 – 31 December 1892
- Constituency: Rio Grande do Sul

Personal details
- Born: 19 November 1863 Caçapava do Sul, Rio Grande do Sul, Brazil
- Died: 25 May 1961 (aged 97) Porto Alegre, Rio Grande do Sul, Brazil
- Party: PRR (1882–1937); UDN (1945–1961)
- Spouse: Carlinda Gonçalves Borges (m. 1889; died 1957)
- Parents: Augusto César de Medeiros (father); Miguelina de Lima Borges (mother)
- Education: Faculty of Law of Recife
- Occupation: Editor of A Federação
- Profession: Journalist; Lawyer

Military service
- Allegiance: Brazil
- Years of service: 1893–1895
- Rank: Lieutenant colonel
- Battles/wars: Federalist Revolution

Antônio Augusto Borges de Medeiros (19 November 1863 – 25 April 1961) was a Brazilian lawyer, judge, and politician. He served as Chief Judge and was appointed as the President of Rio Grande do Sul for a total of 25 years (1898–1908 and 1913–1928), during the period of Brazilian history known as the República Velha. He "inherited" the presidency from Júlio de Castilhos, the local dictator against whom the 1893 Federalist Revolution had been fought. Supporters of Borges de Medeiros were known as borgistas.

Medeiros was born in Caçapava do Sul. He completed his studies at the Faculty of Law of São Paulo in 1881. He transferred to the Faculty of Law of Recife in 1885 and graduated with a bachelor's degree. He also fought alongside the legalists in the Federalist Revolution and received the rank of Lieutenant-Colonel. In 1898, He was nominated as president of Rio Grande Do Sul and held the title for 10 years until he resigned in 1908. He returned to politics in 1913 and was re-elected as President of Rio Grande Do Sul and served for another 15 years until 1928, when he stepped down to nominate Getulio Vargas as his successor. He was a supporter and "mentor" of Getulio Vargas, though he only approved of the 1930 Revolution at the last moment. He slowly began to oppose him after, as he supported the Constitutionalist Revolution.

He was later granted amnesty in 1934, and ran in that years' presidential election, but was defeated by President Getúlio Vargas, with 59 votes to 175. He died in Porto Alegre, on 25 April 1961, aged 97.
