= List of monarchs of Brazil =

Monarchy of Brazil
- Imperial
- Imperial Coat of arms

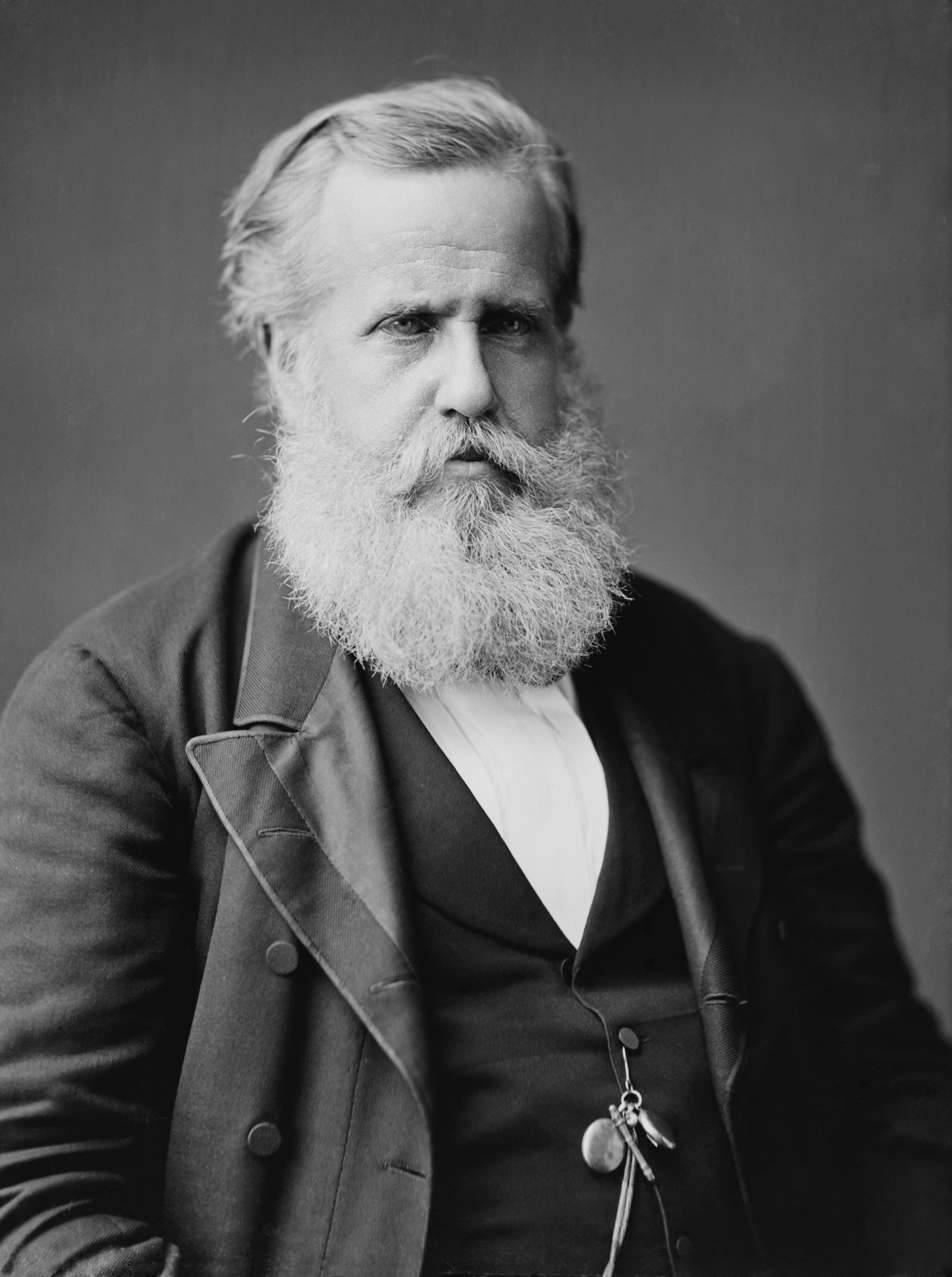
- Last to reign Pedro II; 1831–1889

Details
- Style: His/Her Most Faithful Majesty; His/Her Imperial Majesty
- First monarch: Maria I (as queen)
- Last monarch: Pedro II (as emperor)
- Formed: 16 December 1815
- Abolished: 15 November 1889
- Pretenders: Disputed: Prince Bertrand (Vassouras Branch) Pedro Carlos Orléans-Braganza (Petrópolis Branch)

The monarchs of Brazil (Portuguese: monarcas do Brasil) were the imperial heads of state and hereditary rulers of Brazil from the House of Braganza that reigned from the creation of the Brazilian monarchy in 1815 as a constituent kingdom of the United Kingdom of Portugal, Brazil and the Algarves until the republican coup d'état that overthrew the Empire of Brazil in 1889.

The coast of the territory which would become known as Brazil was first explored by Portuguese navigators on 22 April 1500. This territory was subsequently colonized by the Portuguese crown. Since the transfer of the Portuguese court to Brazil in 1808, colonial rule had de facto ended. On 16 December 1815, Prince Regent John, the future king John VI, raised Brazil to the status of a kingdom, thus making his mother, Maria I, the reigning queen, the first monarch of Brazil. The next year, 20 March 1816, John succeeded his mother as king of the united Luso-Brazilian monarchy. Having proclaimed independence of the Kingdom of Brazil from Portugal in 1822, Pedro I, son of John VI, was acclaimed the first emperor of Brazil on 12 October 1822. He was later succeeded on 7 April 1831 by his son Pedro II, deposed along with the 74-year-old monarchy on 15 November 1889 in a bloodless and unpopular military coup d'état.

== Title ==
From 16 December 1815 to 7 September 1822, while the Kingdom of Brazil was in union with the Kingdom of Portugal, the monarch's full title and styles were, according to tradition and the United Kingdom's 1822 Constitution: By the Grace of God, King/Queen of the United Kingdom of Portugal, Brazil, and the Algarves, of either side of the sea in Africa, Lord of Guinea and of Conquest, Navigation and Commerce of Ethiopia, Arabia, Persia and India, etc.

From 12 October 1822 to 15 November 1889, as the independent Empire of Brazil, the country's monarch's full title were: By Grace of God and Unanimous Acclamation of the People, Constitutional Emperor/Empress and Perpetual Defender of Brazil.

It's worth noting that from a short period of time, between 15 November 1825 and 10 March 1826, according to the Treaty of Rio de Janeiro, by which Portugal recognized Brazilian independence, it was granted to King John VI the courtesy title of Emperor of Brazil, while his son was the actual reigning emperor. From the treaty's date to his death John VI used the title: By the Grace of God, John VI, Emperor of Brazil, King of Portugal and the Algarves, of either side of the sea in Africa, Lord of Guinea and of Conquest, Navigation and Commerce of Ethiopia, Arabia, Persia and India, etc.

== Kingdom of Brazil (1815–1822) ==
The house of Braganza continued to rule over Brazil, and on 16 December 1815, the Prince Regent João, the future king John VI raised Brazil to the status of a kingdom, thus making his mother, Maria I, the reigning Queen, the first Monarch of Brazil. The next year, 20 March 1816, John succeeded his mother as King of the united Portuguese-Brazilian monarchy.

Name	Lifespan	Reign start	Reign end	Notes	Family	Image
Maria I: The Pious; The Mad	17 December 1734 – 20 March 1816 (aged 81)	16 December 1815	20 March 1816	Daughter of Joseph I of Portugal	Braganza	
John VI: The Clement; Portuguese: João VI	13 May 1767 – 10 March 1826 (aged 58)	20 March 1816	7 September 1822	Son of Maria I of Portugal and Brazil	Braganza	

== Empire of Brazil (1822–1889) ==
The house of Braganza continued to rule over Brazil after Pedro I, son of John VI, was acclaimed the first Emperor of Brazil on 12 October 1822, having proclaimed the independence of the Kingdom of Brazil from Portugal. He was later succeeded on 7 April 1831 by his son Pedro II, the last monarch of Brazil. Pedro II of Brazil, reigned for 58 years, of which the first 9 years were during regencies due to his minority.

Name	Lifespan	Reign start	Reign end	Notes	Family	Image
Pedro I: The Liberator; The Soldier King	12 October 1798 – 24 September 1834 (aged 35)	12 October 1822	7 April 1831	Son of John VI of Portugal	Braganza	
Pedro II: The Magnanimous	2 December 1825 – 5 December 1891 (aged 66)	7 April 1831	15 November 1889	Son of Pedro I of Brazil	Braganza	

== See also ==
- History of Brazil
- History of Portugal
- List of governors-general of Brazil (including the viceroys)
- List of Brazilian royal consorts
- List of presidents of Brazil
- List of Portuguese monarchs
