= List of Brazilian films of the 1920s =

An incomplete list of films produced in Brazil in the 1920s. For an alphabetical list of films currently on Wikipedia see Category:Brazilian films

== 1920 ==
Title	Director	Cast	Genre	Notes
1920
O Crime de Cravinhos	Arturo Carrari	Rodolfo Arena, Antônio de Camilles, Elvira de Camilles, Carmo Nacarato, Filippo Santoro	Mystery	
As Aventuras de Gregório	Luiz de Barros	Manuel F. Araujo, Ernesto Begonha, Yole Burlini, Alvaro Fonseca	Comedy	
Convém Martelar	Manuel F. Araujo	Manuel F. Araujo, António Silva, Carlos Barbosa, Adhemar Gonzaga	Short	January 28
Os Faroleiros	Antônio Leite and Miguel Milano		Drama	March 11 Based on novel by Monteiro Lobato
Coração de Gaúcho	Luiz de Barros	Manuel F. Araujo, Luiz de Barros, Antônia Denegri, Alvaro Fonseca, Cândida Leal, António Silva	Drama	April 26 Based on the novel O gaúcho by José de Alencar
Jóia Maldita	Luiz de Barros	Silvia Bertini, Iole Bertini, Luiz de Barros	Drama	June 7
Como Deus Castiga	Antônio Leite and Miguel Milano	Ignácio Brito, Clarinda Lopes	Drama	July 12 Based on a novel by Joaquim Manoel de Macedo
O Garimpeiro	Vittorio Capellaro	Vittorio Capellaro	Drama	December 20 based on the 1870s novel O garimpeiro by Bernardo Guimarães

Title	Director	Cast	Genre	Notes
1921
Um Crime no Parque Paulista	Arturo Carrari	Nicola Tartaglione	Mystery	
Carlitinhos	José Medina		Short comedy	
Perversidade	José Medina	Inocência Colado, Regina Fuína, Maria Fuína, Carlos Ferreira	Short comedy	
1922
Amor de Filha	Arturo Carrari	Yolanda Belli		
Do Rio a São Paulo Para Casar	José Medina	Waldemar Moreno, Antônio Marques Costa Filho, Nicola Tartaglione, Carlos Ferreira	Romance	
O Furto dos 500 Milhões de Réis	Arturo Carrari	José Fontana, Nicola Tartaglione	Crime	
No País das Amazonas	Agesilau De Araujo and Silvino Santos		Feature documentary	One of the earliest films to document the Amazon rainforest on camera
1923
O Brazil Grandioso	Alberto Botelho			
Augusto Anibal quer casar	Luiz de Barros	Augusto Aníbal, Manuel F. Araujo	Comedy	
Cavaleiro Negro	Luiz de Barros	Augusto Aníbal, Manuel F. Araujo	Adventure	
Carnaval Cantado		José Almeida, Célia Bina, Artur Castro, Alice Egito, Luiz Fortini		
Sua Majestade, a Mais Bela	Paulino Botelho		Documentary	
A Canção da Primavera	Igino Bonfioli and Cyprien Segur	Iracema Aleixo, Naná Andrade, Lucinda Barreto, Osiris Colombo, Odilardo Costa	Romantic drama	
João da Mata	Amilar Alves	Amilar Alves	Political drama	
A Sereia de Pedra	Roger Lion	Maria Emília Castelo Branco, Gil Clary, Max Maxudian	Drama	A Portugal film but shown widely in Brazil also.
A Capital Federal				Based on the play
Sofrer Para Gozar	Eugenio Centenaro Kerrigan	Cacilda Alencar, João dos Santos Galvão, Lincoln Garrido	Drama	
1924
Alma Gentil	Antonio Dardes Netto	Benedito Roberto Barbosa, Alfredo Carmonario, Olívio Dardes, Eustáchio Dimarzio, Wanda Fiorisi, Isa Lins	Drama	
Gigolete	Vittorio Verga	Augusto Aníbal		
Paulo e Virginia	Francisco de Almeida Fleming		Drama	
Hei de Vencer	Luis de Barros	Manuel F. Araujo	Drama	
O Segredo do Corcunda	Alberto Traversa		Crime	
O Trem da Morte	José de Picchia	Arturo Carrari		
1925
Aitaré da Praia	Gentil Roiz, Ary Severo (co-director)	José Amaro, Antonio Campos, Mario Cardoso, Queiroz Coutinho, Amália de Souza		
La Mujer de medianoche	Carlo Campogalliani	Paulo Benedetti, Carlo Campogalliani, Amália de Oliveira, Polly de Viana	Mystery drama	
A Carne	Filipe Ricci		Drama	
Quando Elas Querem	Eugenio Centenaro Kerrigan, Paolo Trinchera	Bertoli Carmelo, Luiz de Barros, César Fronzi, Yolanda Fronzi, Regina Fuína	Comedy	9 December
1926
Audácia do Ciúme	Ary Severo			
Corações em Suplício	Eugenio Centenaro Kerrigan	Miguel Ascoli, Tonico Caravieri, Lídia Chermont, Miriam Chermont, Hippólito Collomb	Drama	
Do Risos e Lagrimas	Alberto Traversa	Eduardo Arouca, João Baldi, Túlia Burlini, Virgínia Cassoval, Anita Henrys	Drama	
Em Defesa da Irmã	Eduardo Abelim	Eduardo Abelim, Isolda Fernandes, Antonio Ferreira	Short drama	
Fogo de Palha	Canuto Mendes de Almeida	Vicente Bifano, Rosa de Maio, Diógenes de Nioac, Múcio de Sèvres, Georgette Ferret, Joaquim Garnier		
O Guaraní	Vittorio Capellaro	Mazza Amanda Mauceri, Vittorio Capellaro, Domenico Cesarini, Margarida Collado	Drama	
Vicio e Beleza	Antonio Tibiriçá	Rosa de Maio, Yolanda Flora, Francisco Madrigano, Lelita Rosa, Anita Sabatini, Antonio Sorrentino	Drama	
1927
Ambição Castigada	William H. Jansen	Cacilda Alencar, Milton Braga, Olga Breno, Edgard Cardoso, Arnaldo Conde		
Amor de Mãe	Arturo Carrari	Maria Isabel, Nicola Tartaglielli	Drama	
O Descrente	Francisco Madrigano	Esther D'Alva, João F. de Alencar, Ronaldo de Alencar, Francisco de Simone, Augusto Duarte Júnior	Drama	March 6
O Castigo do Orgulho	Eduardo Abelim	Eduardo Abelim, Antônio Aveiro, Antônio Ferreira, Waldomiro Kerting	Drama	July 11
1928
Amor que Redime	Eugenio Centenaro Kerrigan	Henrique Brands, Vicente de Paulo, Júlio Goyer, Nelly Grant, Rina Lara	Drama	
Brasil Animado	Luis Seel			
O Crime da Mala	Francisco Madrigano	Yuco Lindberg, Aldo Lins, Wanda Lins, Francisco Madrigano	Crime	
Morfina	Francisco Madrigano	Guilherme Bocchialino, Cléo de Málaga, Lia Jardim, Iris Maraino, Potiguar Medeiros	Crime	
Senhorita Agora Mesmo	Pedro Comello	Pedro Comello, Bastos Estephâniom, Ben Nil, Eva Nil	Short	
1929
Acabaram-se os Otários	Luiz de Barros	Genésio Arruda, Gina Bianchi, Tom Bill, Vicenzo Caiaffa	Comedy	
Amor Não Traz Vantagens	Luiz de Barros	Genésio Arruda, Vicenzo Caiaffa, Rina Weiss	Short musical	
Casa de Caboclo	Luiz de Barros	Gastão Formenti	Short musical	
Como Se Gosta	Luiz de Barros	Januário de Oliveira	Short	
Barro Humano	Adhemar Gonzaga	Gracia Morena, Lelita Rosa, Eva Schnoor, Eva Nil, Carlos Modesto, Martha Torá, Luiza Valle, Dona Chincha	Drama	Lost film
Escrava Isaura				
Enquanto São Paulo Dorme	Francisco Madrigano	João Cipriano, Filomena Colado, Inocência Colado, Ronaldo de Alencar	Drama	One of the earliest Brazilian sound films
Fragmentos da vida	José Medina	Áurea de Aremar, Carlos Ferreira, Alfredo Roussy	Short musical	
Orgulho da Mocidade	Francisco Madrigano	Amadeu Belluci, Antônio Caldas, Domingos Cipulo, Esther D'Alva, Ismael Lopes	Comedy	
Revelação	Eugenio Centenaro Kerrigan	Raul Candal, Nelly Grant, Walter Holger, Ivo Morgova, Roberto Zango	Drama	
Sinfonia da Floresta	Vittorio Verga	Augusto Aníbal, Luiz Barreiras, Norberto Bittencourt, Lia Brasil, Luiza Valle	Romance	
Veneno Branco	Luis Seel	Odilon Azevedo, Armando Braga, Antoine Cassal, Gina Cavalieri, Yolanda Flora		
