= 1923 in Brazil =

The following events occurred in Brazil in the year 1923.

== Incumbents ==
=== Federal government ===
- President: Artur Bernardes
- Vice President: Estácio de Albuquerque Coimbra

=== Governors ===
- Alagoas: José Fernandes de Barros Lima
- Amazonas: César do Rego Monteiro
- Bahia: José Joaquim Seabra
- Ceará:
  - till 12 July: Justiniano de Serpa
  - from 12 July: Ildefonso Albano
- Goiás:
  - till 27 July: Eugênio Rodrigues Jardim
  - from 27 July: Miguel da Rocha Lima
- Maranhão:
  - till 20 January: Raul da Cunha Machado
  - from 20 January: Godofredo Mendes Viana
- Mato Grosso: Pedro Celestino Corrêa da Costa
- Minas Gerais: Raul Soares
- Pará: Antônio Emiliano de Sousa
- Paraíba: Sólon Barbosa de Lucena
- Paraná: Caetano Munhoz da Rocha
- Pernambuco: Sérgio Teixeira Lins de Barros Loreto
- Piauí: João Luís Ferreira
- Rio Grande do Norte: Antonio José de Melo e Sousa
- Rio Grande do Sul: Antônio Augusto Borges de Medeiros
- Santa Catarina:
- São Paulo:
- Sergipe:

=== Vice governors ===
- Rio Grande do Norte:
- São Paulo:

== Events ==
- 3 May - Brazil sign the Pan-American Treaty.
- 13 August - Grand opening of the Copacabana Palace hotel in Rio de Janeiro.
- date unknown
  - The Brazilian Society of Chemistry is founded.
  - Brazil's first radio broadcasting station, the Radio Society of Rio de Janeiro, is founded; it is still working under the name Rádio MEC.
  - Medeiros e Albuquerque becomes President of the Academia Brasileira de Letras.
  - Construction of the Basilica of Our Lady of Lourdes, Belo Horizonte was completed.

== Arts and culture ==
=== Films ===
- A Canção da Primavera, directed by Igino Bonfioli and Cyprien Segur.
- Augusto Anibal quer casar, directed by Luiz de Barros
- João da Mata, directed by and starring Amilar Alves

== Births ==
- 11 January – Sérgio Porto, writer (died 1968)
- 22 January – Marcus Vinícius Dias, basketball player (died 1992)
- 19 April – Lygia Fagundes Telles, novelist and writer (died 2022)
- 16 August – Millôr Fernandes, journalist, cartoonist, humorist and playwright (died 2012)
- 30 October – Lourdinha Bittencourt, actress (died 1979)
- 1 November – Newton Holanda Gurgel, Bishop of Crato 1993-2001 (died 2017)
- 14 November – Cleyde Yáconis, actress (died 2013)

== Deaths ==
- 1 March – Rui Barbosa, writer and politician (born 1849)
- 11 March – Júlia da Silva Bruhns, mother of Thomas Mann (born 1851)

== See also ==
- 1923 in Brazilian football
