= 1924 in Brazil =

Events in the year 1924 in Brazil.

== Incumbents ==
=== Federal government ===
- President: Artur Bernardes
- Vice President: Estácio de Albuquerque Coimbra

=== Governors ===
- Alagoas: José Fernandes de Barros Lima (till 12 June); Pedro da Costa Rego (from 12 June)
- Amazonas: César do Rego Monteiro (until 30 October); Raimundo Rodrigues Barbosa (30 October - 2 December); Alfredo Sá
- Bahia: José Joaquim Seabra, then Góis Calmon
- Ceará:
  - till 12 July: Ildefonso Albano
  - from 12 July: José Moreira da Rocha
- Goiás:
  - till March 31: Miguel da Rocha Lima
  - March 31 - April 25: Joaquim Rufino Ramos Jubé
  - from April 25: Miguel da Rocha Lima
- Maranhão: Godofredo Mendes Viana
- Mato Grosso: Pedro Celestino Corrêa da Costa, then Estêvão Alves Correia
- Minas Gerais:
  - till 4 August: Raul Soares
  - 4 August - 21 December: Olegário Maciel
  - from 21 December: Fernando de Mello Viana
- Pará: Antônio Emiliano de Sousa
- Paraíba:
  - till 22 October: Sólon Barbosa de Lucena
  - from 22 October: João Suassuna
- Paraná: Caetano Munhoz da Rocha
- Pernambuco: Sérgio Teixeira Lins de Barros Loreto
- Piauí:
  - till 1 July: João Luís Ferreira
  - from 1 July: Matias Olímpio de Melo
- Rio Grande do Norte: José Augusto Bezerra de Medeiros
- Rio Grande do Sul: Antônio Augusto Borges de Medeiros
- Santa Catarina: Hercílio Luz (until 20 October)
- São Paulo:
- Sergipe:

=== Vice governors ===
- Rio Grande do Norte:
- São Paulo:

== Events ==
- Colégio Campos Salles, private school is founded.
- 4 May – Among competitors at the Summer Olympics are eight Brazilian athletes, two rowers and a sport shooter. The country does not win any medals.
- 5-28 July - Military revolt in São Paulo.

== Arts and culture ==
=== Films ===
- Gigolete, directed by Vittorio Verga and starring Augusto Aníbal
- O Trem da Morte, starring Arturo Carrari
- Paulo e Virginia, directed by Francisco de Almeida Fleming

=== Books ===
- Oswald de Andrade – Memórias Sentimentais de João Miramar

== Births ==
- 25 April – Paulo Machado de Carvalho Filho, businessman and impresario (died 2010)
- 13 May – Sérgio Hingst, actor (died 2004)
- 4 June – Adelmar Faria Coimbra-Filho, biologist and primatologist, after whom Coimbra Filho's titi is named after him. (died 2016)
- 13 August
  - Helena Meirelles, guitarist and composer (died 2005)
  - Serafim Fernandes de Araújo, cardinal (died 2019)
- 10 October – Lídia Mattos, actress (died 2013)
- 24 October – Aziz Ab'Sáber, environmentalist (died 2012)

== Deaths ==
- 31 March – Nilo Peçanha, politician, former President and Vice-President (born 1867)
- 21 May
  - Blessed Adílio Daronch, student (born 1908; shot and killed by revolutionaries)
  - Blessed Manuel Gómez González, missionary (born 1877)
- 20 October – Hercílio Luz, politician (born 1860)

== See also ==
- 1924 in Brazilian football
