= 1922 in Brazil =

Events in the year 1922 in Brazil.

== Incumbents ==
=== Federal government ===
- President: Epitácio Pessoa (to 14 November); Artur Bernardes (from 15 November)
- Vice President: Francisco Álvaro Bueno de Paiva (to 14 November); Estácio de Albuquerque Coimbra (from 15 November)

=== Governors ===
- Alagoas: José Fernandes de Barros Lima
- Amazonas: César do Rego Monteiro
- Bahia: José Joaquim Seabra
- Ceará: Justiniano de Serpa
- Goiás: Eugênio Rodrigues Jardim
- Maranhão: Urbano Santos (to 25 February); Raul da Cunha Machado (from 25 February)
- Mato Grosso: Francisco de Aquino Correia, then Pedro Celestino Corrêa da Costa
- Minas Gerais:
  - until 7 September: Artur Bernardes
  - from 7 September: Raul Soares
- Pará: Antônio Emiliano de Sousa
- Paraíba: Sólon Barbosa de Lucena
- Paraná: Caetano Munhoz da Rocha
- Pernambuco:
  - until 18 October: Severino Marques de Queirós Pinheiro
  - from 18 October: Sérgio Teixeira Lins de Barros Loreto
- Piauí: João Luís Ferreira
- Rio Grande do Norte: Antonio José de Melo e Sousa
- Rio Grande do Sul: Antônio Augusto Borges de Medeiros
- Santa Catarina:
- São Paulo:
- Sergipe:

=== Vice governors ===
- Rio Grande do Norte:
- São Paulo:

== Events ==
- 11-18 February - Modern Art Week is held in São Paulo, marking the beginning of Brazilian Modernism.
- 1 March - In the Brazilian presidential election, Artur Bernardes of the Mineiro Republican Party receives 56.0% of the vote.
- May - The Dom Vital Center is created.
- 5 July - The 18 of the Copacabana Fort revolt occurs in Rio de Janeiro, then Federal District of Brazil. It is the first revolt of the tenentista movement, in the context of the Brazilian Old Republic.
- 22 October - Brazil defeats Paraguay 3-0 to win the 1922 South American Championship.
- date unknown - Adalgisa Ferreira marries Ismael Nery.

== Arts and culture ==
=== Books ===
- Os Bruzundangas

=== Films ===
- Do Rio a São Paulo Para Casar, directed by José Medina and starring Waldemar Moreno
- O Furto dos 500 Milhões de Réis, directed by Arturo Carrari and starring José Fontana

== Births ==
- 7 January - Leopoldo Nachbin, mathematician (died 1993)
- 22 January - Leonel Brizola, politician (died 2004)
- 4 April - Dionísio Azevedo, actor (as Taufic Jacob; died 1994)
- 8 May – Dona Neuma, samba dancer (died 2000)
- 1 June - Bibi Ferreira, actress (as Abigail Izquierdo Ferreira) (died 2019)
- 5 July - Hélio Bicudo, Brazilian jurist and politician (died 2018)
- 7 September - Paulo Autran, actor (died 2007)
- 13 October - Gilberto Mendes, composer (died 2016)
- 26 October - Darcy Ribeiro, anthropologist, author and politician (died 1997)

== Deaths ==
- date unknown - Graciano dos Santos Neves, physician and politician (born 1868)
- May 7 - Urbano Santos da Costa Araújo, vice president (born 1859)

== See also ==
- 1922 in Brazilian football
