= Palha =

Palha may refer to:

Places:

- Palha Carga, settlement in Santiago, Cape Verde
- Palha Palace, palace in Lisbon, Portugal
- Palha River, river in Brazil
- São Gabriel da Palha, municipality in Brazil

People:

- Joana Palha (born 1969), Portuguese neuroscientist
- Miguel Palha, Portuguese footballer
- Natasha Palha, Indian tennis player
- Salvador Palha, rugby player

Films:

- Estrada de Palha, 2011 Portuguese film
- Fogo de Palha, 1926 Brazilian film
