= 1926 in Brazil =

Events in the year 1926 in Brazil.

== Incumbents ==
=== Federal government ===
- President:
  - Artur Bernardes (until 14 November)
  - Washington Luís (from 15 November)
- Vice President:
  - Estácio de Albuquerque Coimbra (until 14 November)
  - Fernando de Melo Viana (from 15 November)

=== Governors ===
- Alagoas: Pedro da Costa Rego
- Amazonas: Alfredo Sá (till 1 January); Ifigênio Ferreira de Sales (from 1 January)
- Bahia: Góis Calmon
- Ceará: José Moreira da Rocha
- Goiás: Brasil Caiado
- Maranhão: Godofredo Mendes Viana (till 1 March); José Magalhães de Almeida (from 1 March)
- Mato Grosso: Estêvão Alves Correia, then Mário Correia da Costa
- Minas Gerais: Fernando de Mello Viana (till 7 September); Antônio Carlos Ribeiro de Andrada (from 7 September)
- Pará: Dionísio Bentes
- Paraíba: João Suassuna
- Paraná: Caetano Munhoz da Rocha
- Pernambuco: Sérgio Teixeira Lins de Barros Loreto (till 18 October); Júlio de Melo (18 October - 12 December); Estácio Coimbra (from 12 December)
- Piauí: Matias Olímpio de Melo
- Rio Grande do Norte: José Augusto Bezerra de Medeiros
- Rio Grande do Sul: Antônio Augusto Borges de Medeiros
- Santa Catarina:
- São Paulo: Carlos de Campos (in exile)
- Sergipe:

=== Vice governors ===
- Rio Grande do Norte:
- São Paulo:

== Events ==
- 21 January - Rádio Mayrink Veiga begins broadcasting in Rio de Janeiro.
- 1 March - In the presidential election, Washington Luís of the Republican Party of São Paulo, who received 98.0% of the vote.

== Arts and culture ==
=== Films ===
- Corações em Suplício, directed by Eugenio Centenaro Kerrigan
- O Guaraní, directed by Vittorio Capellaro

== Births ==
=== January ===
- 17 January - Maria d'Apparecida, opera singer (died 2017)

=== April ===
- 20 April - Miriam Pires, actress (died 2004)

=== October ===
- 21 October - Waldir Pires, politician (died 2018)
- 24 October - Francisco de Assis Couto dos Reis, architect and teacher (died 2011)

=== November ===
- November - Miguel Torres de Andrade, writer and actor (died 1962)

== Deaths ==
=== July ===
- 30 July - Lauro Müller, politician, diplomat, and military engineer (born 1863)

== See also ==
- 1926 in Brazilian football
