= Corações em Suplício =

1926 film

- Directed by: Eugenio Centenaro Kerrigan
- Written by: Eugenio Centenaro Kerrigan
- Produced by: Américo Masotti, Carlos Masotti
- Cinematography: Américo Masotti
- Distributed by: Masotti Film
- Release date: 1926
- Country: Brazil
- Language: Silent

Corações em Suplício is a 1926 Brazilian drama film directed by Eugenio Centenaro Kerrigan and produced by Masotti Film (locally also called Estúdios Masotti and Irmãos Masotti) in Guaranésia, MG in 1925, the town where it was run.

The title Corações em Suplício translates as Tormented Hearts or Hearts under Emotional Torture.

== The Masotti Brothers ==
Carlos Masotti was born 28 May 1887, in Lonato, nowadays Lonato del Garda in the Province of Brescia (Lombardy), at the shores of Lake Garda in Italy, to the baker Felipe Masotti and Armida Samaelle Masotti. In 1897, the Masotti family left Italy, emigrating to Brazil, where they fixed their first residence at Rua Rio de Janeiro in Belo Horizonte, MG. And it was here Carlos' brother Américo would be given birth 14 August 1901.

Their father Felipe Masotti had established a bakery in Belo Horizonte and Carlos' first job was helping his father in the bakery as a deliverer. In 1902, when 15 years old, Carlos gets to a job at the press. Excited about his job, he soon shows his talent as a handicraftsman by building a wooden printing machine which he uses to publish Belo Horizonte's first newspaper ever in a foreign language, Un Fiore.

In 1908, Carlos has his own printing shop where he works together with his brother Américo and marries Maria Tortoro with whom he'll have seven children.

== Masotti Film ==
The brothers Carlos and Américo Masotti install themselves in Guaranésia as photographers - art they had learned from Igino Bonfioli in Belo Horizonte, MG - and handicraft workers in 1923. On a trip to São Paulo, SP, they purchase a Debrie camera and, supported by local farmers, run a documentary entitled Guaranésia Pitoresca (Picturesque Guaranésia), filmed by Carlos and photographed by Américo Masotti. Despite no commercial exhibition is done, the documentary's success is enough for the brothers to build – with the support of Fernando Máximo, manager of the local bank Banco Campos, Lima & Cia. – their own film studios and a laboratory for the developing and copying of movies and to found their own movie production company, Masotti Film.

== Eugenio Centenaro Kerrigan ==
In 1925, a man who claims to be an American movie director appears in Guaranésia: he informs his name as Eugene Kerrigan and says he was born in Los Angeles, CA, in 1878. About his heavy Italian accent, he explains he descends from an Italian noble family and that his complete name is Count Eugenio Maria Piglione Rossiglioni de Farnet. As a matter of a fact, he is on the run.

When working at APA Film in Campinas, SP, shortly after finishing Sofrer para Gozar (= To Suffer in order to Enjoy) and while preparing his next one, A Carne, he had been introduced to an actual American and it came out Kerrigan did not know one only word of English or Spanish. He had to get away from Campinas and APA Film's owner Felipe Ricci takes over himself the part of A Carne's director.

First Kerrigan moves to São Paulo, SP, where he had been invited by Visual Film's owner Adalberto de Almada Fagundes to direct the comedy Quando Elas Querem (= When the Women Want). In the beginning of 1925, Quando Elas Querem premiers, Visual Film breaks down and Kerrigan decides it's a good idea to move once more. His new target: Guaranésia, MG.

Kerrigan was actually born in 1878, but in Modena or Genova, Italy, and his name was Eugenio Centennaro.

== Corações em Suplício - The Making of ==
In Guaranésia, Kerrigan visits the Masotti brothers and proposes them his project of a feature film. They accept and Corações em Suplício is run.

Roteiro, argumento e direção ficam a cargo de Kerrigan, a produção corre por conta de Carlos Masotti, auxiliado pela mulher, encarregando-se Américo Masotti da fotografia.

Screenplay, argument and direction are Kerrigan's job, Carlos Masotti, aided by his wife, is in charge of production Americo Masotti does the photography.

Financing is done by the local Banco Campos, Lima & Cia. bank's manager Fernando Máximo.

In Guaranésia there was a major difficulty to find persons willing to act in a movie. Like generally in Minas Gerais at that time, cinema people were often seen as immoral. So good part of the actors and actresses had to be brought from São Paulo. But yet the makers of the movie and the two daughters of Carlos Masotti would have to join the cast.

The cast for the main roles was composed by José Rodrigues, an experienced actor who had already performed under Kerrigan's direction at APA Film and Lilian Loty, until then a theater actress in São Paulo, for the respective main roles. Another important male role was performed by William Gautier. For Waldemar Rodrigues, that one's the pseudonym Kerrigan himself joins the cast with. And two daughters of Carlos Masotti's, Míriam (pseudonym: Miriam Clermont) and Lídia (pseudonym: Lídia Clermont) play minor female roles .

== Corações em Suplício - Incidents ==
- The main actress, Lilian Loty, constantly refused to use skirts when not filming and did not care at all for the scandal a woman in trousers would mean on Brazilian countryside in the 1920s.
- The scandal grew when Lilian Loty still started an affair with the local farmer Oliveira Ramos who's described as a respected and married gentleman.
- There's cabaret scenes in Corações e Suplício, and a major trouble was how to run them since among the local young women nobody was willing to take a mundane's role. The producers made the trip to the neighboring Guaxupé and hired actual hookers at a brothel there. While these scenes were run, the prostitutes exceeded dancing and giving scandals in public so that a collective arrest was announced.
- For the cabaret scenes, Guaranésia's young single men seemed to enjoy "helping out" with background roles: this caused the break-up of a huge amount of courtships and engagements.

== Corações em Suplício - The Movie ==
Corações em Suplício is one of those dramas where in the end the hero saves the young lady at the last moment. During the adventures, the hero takes a blow on his head, goes crazy but is finally healed by a famous alienist. Madnesses and amnesias finally healed through competent professional intervention are a recurrent issue in Mineiro movies from those years. Two examples stated are Pedro Comello's Os Três Irmãos (= The Three Brothers; Cataguases, 1925) and José Silva's Perante Deus (= Before God; Belo Horizonte, 1930).

The film premiered at Teatro Rio Branco in Guaranésia Thursday, 7 January 1926, at 7:30 pm. Few days later - before 13 January - it officially premiered at Cine Rialto in Rio de Janeiro, RJ.

No surviving copy is known of this movie is known despite one has been informed to exist, but not yet located. What remains of Masotti brothers' work are the saints in Guaranésia's Matriz Church they fixed soon after their arrival in 1923.

== Corações em Suplício - Critics ==
Cinema magazine Selecta's critics consider the movie good but focus on Kerrigan with restrictions, what might be due to the high debts he assumed during the making of Corações em Suplício. Américo Masotti's photography is highly praised and the film is recommended to be watched. In its issue from 13 January 1926, it says: "E. C. Kerrigan is not yet a practical director, nor does he seem to be the same for the whole movie". But Selecta's critics state: "It's not yet a perfect work, but it's always better than many foreign movies, including North-American ones, we have watched". After Rio de Janeiro, the movie premiers in several Brazilian cities and abroad, including in the United States and France.

== Corações em Suplício - The Aftermath ==
The production of Corações em Suplício had cost more than any commercial success could return, specially since Kerrigan had been extremely generous in taking bank loans - it's said that specially for himself - accounted for Masotti Film.

Banco Campos, Lima & Cia. ends going bankrupt.

Carlos Masotti and Américo Masotti transfer themselves and their Masotti Film to Belo Horizonte where they still produce some documentaries, but they never recover financially and go into bankruptcy either. Carlos Masotti dies shortly after, 10 December 1927.

Kerrigan leaves Guaranésia and moves to Porto Alegre, RS where in 1928 he runs Amor que Redime for Ita Film, a movie for which photography he calls his former sponsor Thomaz de Tullio from Campinas, SP. One year later, in 1929, he directs his last movie, Revelação for Porto Alegre's Unifilmes studios.

When years later it came out that Kerrigan actually was an Italian immigrant called Eugenio Centenaro, his old friend Arturo Carrari - who had accompanied Kerrigan's inventions and feats - proposed him to produce a biographic movie of his life, with Kerrigan himself in the role of the fake count, but that project never became real. Kerrigan died in Porto Alegre 25 December 1956.

== Production ==
- Carlos Masotti

== Photography ==
- Américo Masotti

== Director ==
- Eugenio Centenaro Kerrigan

== Cast ==
- Lilian Loty (actually Isaura (Loty?), also known as Lia de Loty, Djenane de Loty and Lilian de Loty; female main role)
- José Rodrigues (Roberto Rodrigues, according to some sources; male main role)
- William Gautier
- Waldemar Rodrigues (name under which Kerrigan took part in the cast)
- Miguel Ascoli
- Tonico Caravieri
- Lídia Clermont (actually Lídia Masotti, daughter of Carlos Masotti)
- Míriam Clermont (actually Míriam Masotti, daughter of Carlos Masotti)
- Hippólito Collomb
- José do Plínio
- Rosetti Finzi
- Eurico Flavi
- Fernando Latorre (in his civil life, a taylor in Guaranésia)
- Jacomino Pardini
- William Rodrigues
- Antonio Rolando

== Bibliography ==
- Rubá de Andrade: O Ciclo de Guaranésia - São Paulo, SP: Secretaria da Cultura, Ciência e Tecnologia/ Museu da Imagem e do Som
- Paulo Emílio Salles Gomes: Humberto Mauro, Cataguases, Cinearte - São Paulo, SP: Editora Perspectiva / EDUSP, 1974
- Fernão Ramos (org.): História do Cinema Brasileiro - São Paulo, SP: Art Editora, 1987
