= Sofia Santos =

Portuguese 19th and 20th-century stage and film actor

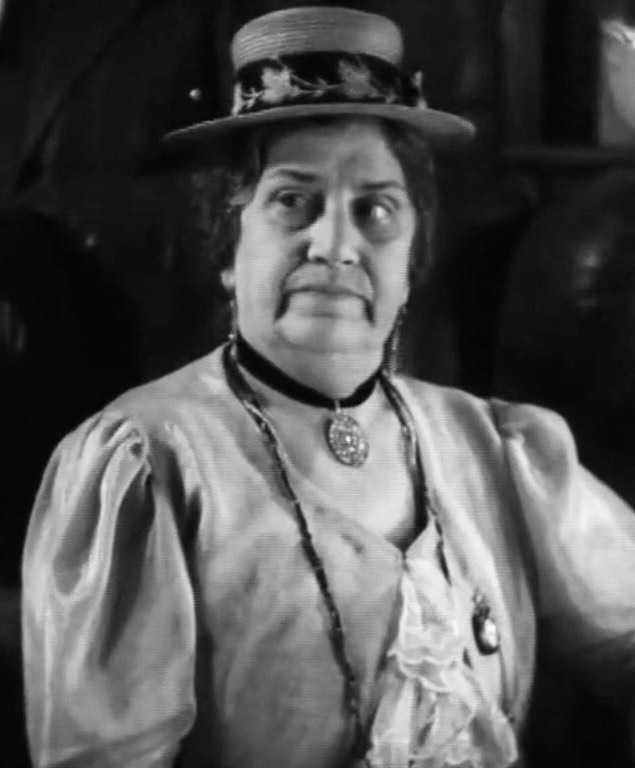
- Sofia Santos in the role of Aunt Efigénia in the film A Canção de Lisboa
- Born: Maria Sofia dos Santos Gomes; 31 August 1869; Lisbon, Portugal
- Died: 21 May 1945 (aged 75); Lisbon, Portugal
- Resting place: Prazeres Cemetery, Lisbon
- Occupation: Actor
- Years active: 55
- Known for: Portuguese theatre and film

Sofia Santos (31 August 1869 – 21 May 1945) was a Portuguese actress.

== Early life ==
Maria Sofia dos Santos Gomes was born on 31 August 1869 in the parish of São José, in the Portuguese capital of Lisbon. She was the daughter of the journalist Manuel Domingues dos Santos and the actor Maria do Céu e Silva, who were unmarried. Santos was baptised at home because it was thought that she might die, and was never baptised in a church, which was the only means of formal birth registration at the time. She was legitimised by her parents' subsequent marriage in 1887. She had an older sister, Maria Clementina Augusta dos Santos, who was briefly an actress and a younger brother, Augusto Abel dos Santos. At the age of 30 she married António Luís da Cunha Gomes. They had no children.

== Acting career ==
Santos first performed at the age of 16 in the town of Beja. She debuted professionally at the age of 17, in 1886, at the Teatro dos Recreios, in the French comedy Maris qui pleurent (Husbands who cry), translated into Portuguese by Maximiliano de Azevedo. When the Teatro dos Recreios was demolished, she moved to the Teatro do Rato. She would then successively work in the Teatro da Alegria, Teatro Avenida, Teatro da Rua dos Condes, Teatro do Ginásio, Teatro da Trindade and the Teatro São Luiz.

Santos excelled in operettas, comic operas, farce and vaudeville. She worked with most of the famous theatre companies of the time, including the Rey Colaço-Robles Monteiro Company, and the Teatro da Trindade Company. In addition to seasons in Portugal's second city of Porto, she toured in Brazil, Spain and other parts of Portugal. When unable to obtain a professional position, she would act in amateur dramatics. Her last performance was the operetta O Fado, which premiered on 4 April 1942 at the Coliseu dos Recreios auditorium in Lisbon and ended a year later, at the Coliseu do Porto, another large auditorium. In total, she worked for 14 companies and appeared in 62 shows.

Santos made her film debut in 1909 in the silent film A Viúva Alegre (The Happy Widow). Her first sound film and most well-known film was A Canção de Lisboa (The Song of Lisbon) in 1933, where she played the aunt of the actor Vasco Santana. Several of her films were made in Brazil.

== Death ==
Santos died on 21 May 1945 in Lisbon, where she had always lived, a victim of arteriosclerosis. She is buried in the Prazeres Cemetery in Lisbon.

== Films ==
- A Viúva Alegre (The Merry Widow-1909)
- Mal de España (1918)
- Os Faroleiros (The Lighthouse Keepers-1922)
- A Castelã das Berlengas (The Castle of the Berlengas-1930)
- A Canção de Lisboa (The Song of Lisbon-1933)
- Aldeia da Roupa Branca (White Clothes Village-1939)
- O Pai Tirano (The Tyrant Father) (1941)
- Amor de Perdição (Love of perdition-1943)
- O Violino do João (João's Violin-1944)
