= Gigolette =

Gigolette may refer to:

- Gigolette (1935 film), an American romance film
- Gigolette (1937 film), a French drama film

== See also ==
- Gigolete, a 1924 Brazilian silent drama film
- Gigolettes, a 1932 American Pre-Code comedy film
