= Perdida =

Perdida may refer to:

- Perdida (1916 film), a silent Brazilian film
- Lost (1950 film) (Spanish: Perdida), a Mexican drama film
- Perdida (2018 film), an Argentine-Spanish drama film
- Perdida (2019 film), a Mexican drama film
- Perdida (album), a 2020 music album by American rock band Stone Temple Pilots
- Perdida River, a river in central Brazil
- "Perdida", a 2006 song by La Oreja de Van Gogh from Guapa
