= Antonio Sorrentino =

Antonio Sorrentino may refer to:

- Antonio Sorrentino, actor in Hei de Vencer
- Antonio Sorrentino, character in Bitten (TV series)
