= Jóia Maldita =

1920 film directed by Luiz de Barros

- Directed by: Luiz de Barros
- Written by: Antonio Tibiriçá
- Produced by: Antonio Tibiriçá
- Starring: Manuel F. Araujo
- Cinematography: Paulino Botelho
- Edited by: Luiz de Barros
- Distributed by: Pátria Filme
- Release date: 7 June 1920
- Country: Brazil
- Language: Silent

Jóia Maldita is a 1920 Brazilian silent drama film directed by and starring Luiz de Barros.

The film premiered on 7 June 1920 in Rio de Janeiro.

== Cast ==
- Sílvia Bertini
- Iole Burlini
- Antonio Caramuru
- Luiz de Barros
- Haroldo Junqueira
- Pedro Lima
- Atila Moraes
- Alice Ribeiro
- Jácomo Sorrentino
- Antonio Tibiriçá (as Paulo Sullis)
