= A Canção de Lisboa =

1933 film

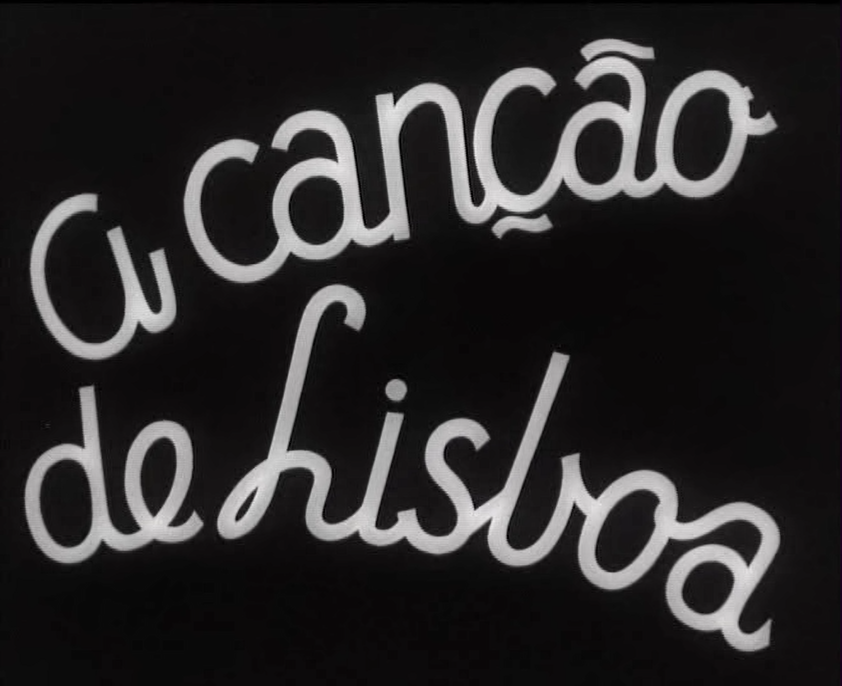
- Directed by: José Cottinelli Telmo
- Written by: José Cottinelli Telmo
- Produced by: João Ortigão Ramos
- Starring: Vasco Santana; Beatriz Costa; António Silva
- Cinematography: Henri Barreyre; César de Sá
- Edited by: Tonka Taldy
- Music by: Raúl Portela; Jaime Silva Filho
- Production company: Tobis Portuguesa
- Distributed by: Filmes Castello Lopes
- Release date: 7 November 1933
- Running time: 85 minutes
- Country: Portugal
- Language: Portuguese

A Canção de Lisboa (lit. The Song of Lisbon) is a 1933 Portuguese musical comedy film, directed by José Cottinelli Telmo, and starring Vasco Santana, Beatriz Costa, António Silva, Alfredo Silva, Ana Maria, Artur Rodrigues, Coralia Escobar, Eduardo Fernandes, Elvira Coutinho, Fernanda Campos, Francisco Costa, Henrique Alves, Ivone Fernandes, José Victor, Júlia da Assunção, Manoel de Oliveira, Manuel Santos Carvalho, Maria Albertina, Maria da Luz, Silvestre Alegrim, Sofia Santos, Teresa Gomes and Zizi Cosme.

It was the second Portuguese sound feature film (the first was A Severa; a 1931 biopic of the fado singer Maria Severa Onofriana). In fact, A Canção de Lisboa was the first sound feature fully produced in Portugal, in the labs of Lisboa Filme and with Tobis equipment. A Canção de Lisboa premiered at the São Luís Theatre in Lisbon on 7 November 1933, the first in a long line of popular comedies generically referred to as the comédia à portuguesa.

Among the team were some of the greatest names of Portuguese culture of the day, such as painter Carlos Botelho (credited as assistant director) and the poet José Gomes Ferreira (editor assistant). The artist Almada Negreiros was the author of both promotional posters.

A Canção de Lisboa remains a classic of cinema in Portugal, and several of its lines and songs have entered common parlance.

== Plot ==
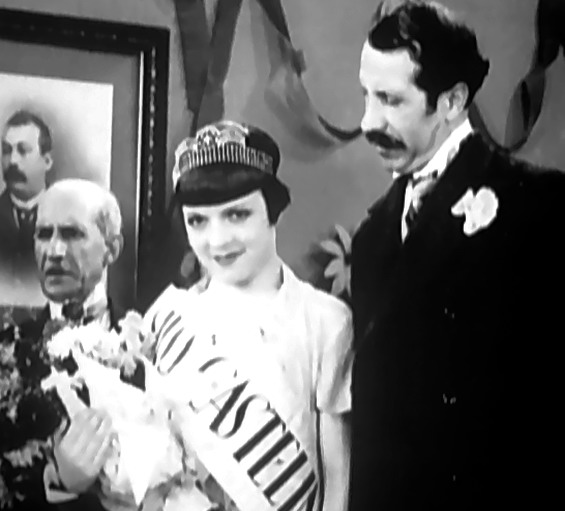
Alice (Beatriz Costa), and her father Caetano (António Silva)

Vasco Leitão (Vasco Santana), a medical student in Lisbon, is supported by a generous allowance from his two rich elderly aunts from Trás-os-Montes, Efigénia and Perpétua (Sofia Santos and Teresa Gomes), whom he had falsely told he had already graduated. In fact, he devotes himself to a bohemian life, preferring the popular fairs and pretty women, especially Alice (Beatriz Costa), a seamstress from the Castelinhos neighbourhood, which rather upsets her ambitious father, Caetano (António Silva), a tailor who is familiar with Vasco's debts. On the same day he fails his final exam, Vasco is surprised by his aunts' announcement that they will visit him in Lisbon to see his practice.

Immediately after arriving in Lisbon, the aunts' bags are stolen and the two elderly ladies faint. Vasco sees himself forced to accept Quinquinhas's (Eduardo Fernandes) suggestion to carry the two unconscious aunts in the carriage announcing an upcoming bullfight; when the aunts come to, they are outraged at the means of conveyance and get cross with Vasco. To soothe their indignation, Vasco asks Caetano for help, and he lies to the aunts, telling them their nephew is an excellent, renowned physician. What Vasco does not know is that Caetano's real interest is the old ladies' large inheritance.

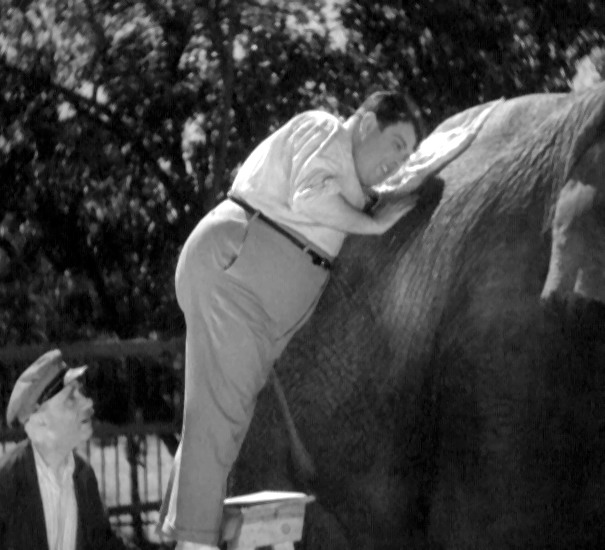
Vasco (Vasco Santana) plays along as he is mixed-up with the vet at the Zoo

Vasco and Alice have a falling out during the Midsummer festival. Meanwhile, at the local recreational society, Caetano single-handedly decides on the outcome of the competition to crown "Miss Castelinhos" so that his daughter Alice can win: the ceremony acts as a musical interlude in which Alce performs a song from a revue, "A Agulha e o Dedal" ("The Needle and the Thimble"), for all the inhabitants of the neighbourhood (who attend in spite of the tedious rhetoric of the jury led by Caetano).

The aunts start getting suspicious and see through Vasco's lies once he cannot show them his surgery and takes them instead to Lisbon Zoo, where he is mixed-up with the Veterinarian. The aunts are ashamed and stop supporting Vasco, and soon start being courted by Caetano and the local cobbler (Alfredo Silva) in a final attempt to get their inheritance.

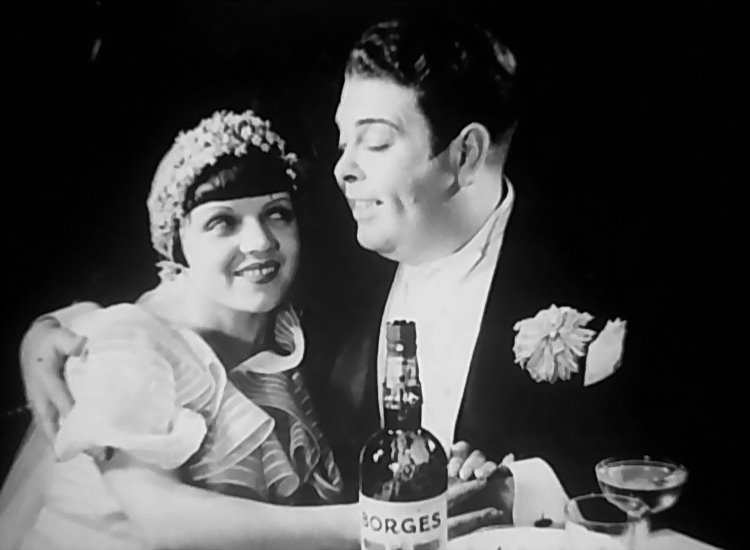
The wedding

Vasco is saved from misery by his good friend Carlos (Manoel de Oliveira), who gets him a job earning his living as a fado singer, turning him into something of a local celebrity. This does not deter him from pursuing a career in medicine, and he finally passes his final examination with flying colours, regaining the favour of his aunts and winning the hand of Alice in marriage.

== Cast ==
- Vasco Santana as Vasco Leitão
- Beatriz Costa as Alice Costa
- António Silva as Caetano Costa
- Sofia Santos as Efigénia Rocha
- Teresa Gomes as Perpétua Rocha
- Manoel de Oliveira as Carlos
- Alfredo Silva as the Cobbler
- Eduardo Fernandes as Quicas
- Ana Maria as Maria da Graça, Carlos's girlfriend
- Manuel Santos Carvalho as Alexandrino
- Silvestre Alegrim as João, waiter

== Popular culture ==
An expression that found its way into everyday life in Portugal was an annoyed Vasco visiting Lisbon Zoo with his aunts and shouting repeatedly : “There's lot of hats, you fool!" (Chapéus há muitos, seu palerma!)

Also his Aunts had no doubts about him studying medicine because he even knew what Sternocleidomastoid (Ele até sabe o que é o esternocleidomastoideo!).

The song "A Agulha e o Dedal", sung by Beatriz Costa, became a household reference.

== DVD version ==
The DVD version was heavily restored, with an additional 3 minutes in length, and a sound and image recovery to match the initial quality.
