= Beatriz Costa =

Portuguese actress (1907–1996)

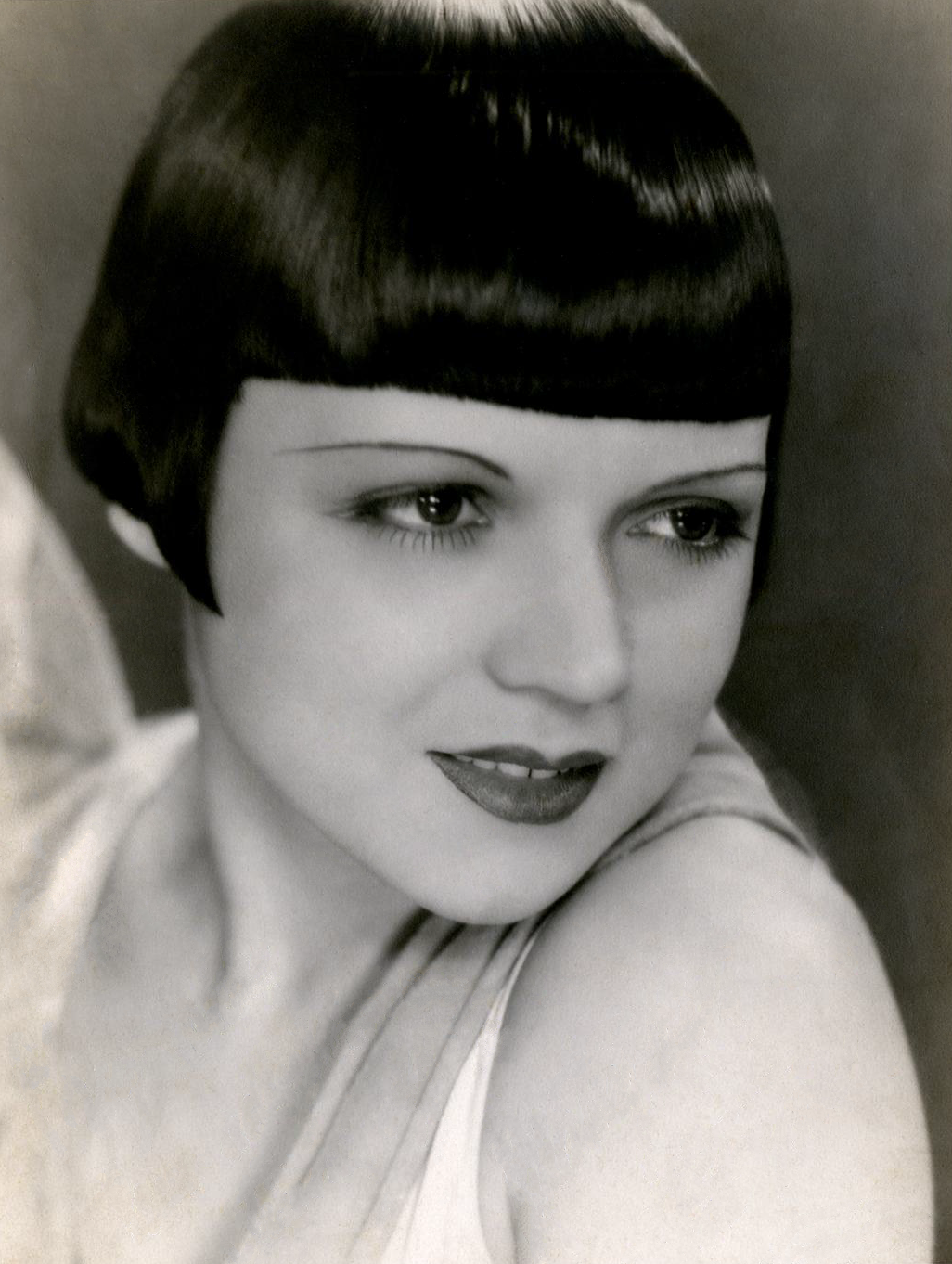
- Born: 14 December 1907; Mafra, Portugal
- Died: 15 April 1996 (aged 88); Lisbon, Portugal
- Occupation: actress

Beatriz Costa (born Beatriz da Conceição, 14 December 1907 – 15 April 1996) was a Portuguese actress, active during the golden age of Portuguese cinema. She was the author of several books.

Costa debuted as a chorus girl in Lisbon at the age of 16, eventually becoming the highest-paid stage actress in Portugal in the 1940s.

She died in Lisbon on 15 April 1996.

== Filmography ==
- A Aldeia da Roupa Branca, de Chianca de Garcia (1939);
- O Trevo de Quatro Folhas, de Chianca de Garcia (1936);
- A Canção de Lisboa, de Cottinelli Telmo (1933)
- Minha Noite de Núpcias, de E. W. Emo (1931)
- Lisboa, de J. Leitão de Barros (1930)
- Fátima Milagrosa, de Rino Lupo (1928);
- O Diabo em Lisboa, de Rino Lupo (1926).

== Books ==
- Sem Papas na Língua (1975)
- Quando os Vascos Eram Santanas… e Não Só (1977)
- Mulheres Sem Fronteiras (1981)
- Nos Cornos da Vida (1984)
- Eles e Eu (1990)
- Saudades do Padeiro (1993)
