= Tobis Portuguesa =

Portuguese Sound Film Company, cultural heritage monument in Lisboa, Portugal

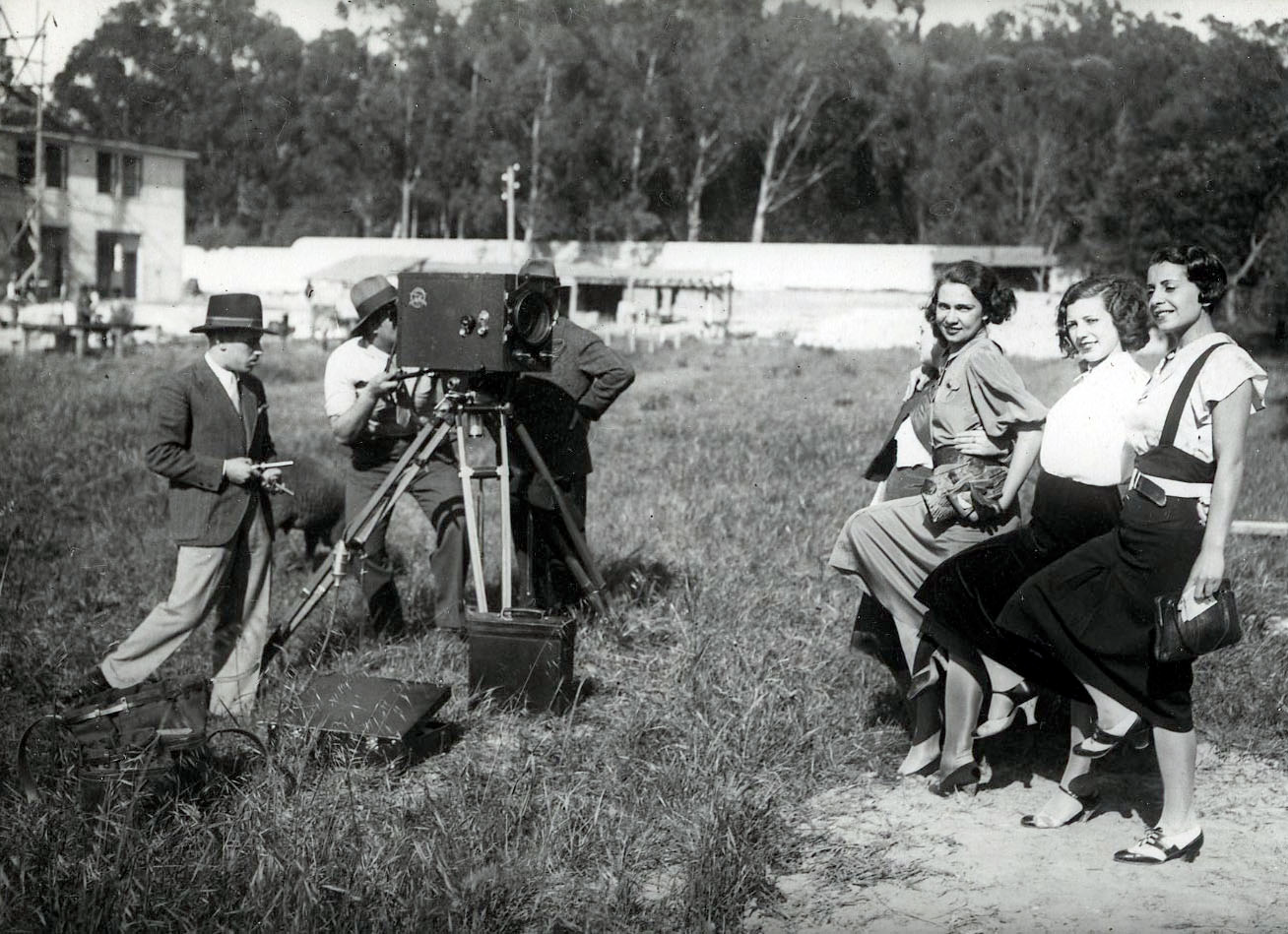
Casting for the Tóbis Portuguesa film A Canção de Lisboa, 26 April 1933

Tobis Portuguesa is a Portuguese film production and lab processing company. Established on June 3, 1932, Tobis produced many of the major works in Portuguese cinema for three decades.

== History ==
Founded in 1932, Tobis originally focused on film production and lab processing. It produced many works of the 1930s, 1940s and 1950s, such as A Canção de Lisboa and O Leão da Estrela.

In 1955, Tobis merged with Lisboa Filmes, one of Portugal's main film producers. The rights to its films were included within the Tobis film catalogue.

In 2004, Tobis acquired digital video transcription equipment. In 2005, Tobis acquired Concept Films.

== Services and facilities ==
- FILMLAB provides film processing, negative cutting, film-based special effects and titles, safety and duplication copies (interpositives and internegatives), optical blowups, colour grading and printing of copies;
- DIGITAL: sound and image postproduction
- ARCHIVES: digital video transcription using restoration tools;
- STUDIO: studio rental.

== Tobis Catalogue ==
- A Canção de Lisboa (1933)
- As Pupilas do Senhor Reitor (1935)
- Varanda dos Rouxinóis (1939)
- João Ratão (1940)
- Ala-Arriba (1942)
- O Costa do Castelo (1943)
- A Menina da Rádio (1944)
- O Leão da Estrela (1947)
- O Grande Elias (1950)
- Benilde ou a Virgem-Mãe (1970)
