= Augusto Aníbal =

Brazilian actor and singer

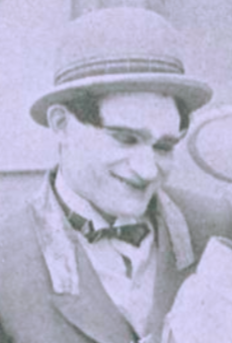
- Born: 1890; Rio de Janeiro, Brazil
- Died: 1965 (aged 74–75); Rio de Janeiro

Augusto Aníbal (1890–1965) was a Brazilian film actor and singer.

In film he starred in over 15 pictures between 1923 and 1952 although his career appeared to develop in two different periods. He appeared in some of the hits of the 1920s making his screen debut in the Luiz de Barros film Augusto Anibal quer casar in 1923 as the central character. This would be immediately followed by Cavaleiro Negro an adventure film also directed by Barros in which he starred alongside Manuel F. Araujo. In the 1930s he concentrated on his singing and only appeared in one film in that decade, in Maridinho de Luxo released in 1938.

He would later make a return in the 1940s where he was once again united with Luiz de Barros, appearing in his films again such as in the musical comedy Caídos do Céu in 1946.

His last credited film was in 1952 in Era uma Vez um Vagabundo. He died in 1965.

== Filmography ==
- Augusto Anibal quer casar (1923)
- Cavaleiro Negro (1923)
- A Sertaneja (1924)
- Gigolete (1924) .... Maneco
- Sinfonia da Floresta (1929) .... Augusto
- Maridinho de Luxo (1938)
- Caídos do Céu (1946) .... Felizardo Boaventura
- Esta é Fina (1948)
- Fogo na Canjica (1948) .... Fulgêncio
- Pra Lá de Boa (1949)
- Eu Quero é Movimento (1949)
- Meu Dia Chegará (1951)
- Anjo do Lodo (1951) .... Chico
- Agüenta Firme, Isidoro (1951)
- Era uma Vez um Vagabundo (1952)

== External links and sources ==
- Augusto Aníbal at IMDb
