= Convém Martelar =

1920 film

- Directed by: Manuel F. Araujo, António Silva
- Starring: Manuel F. Araujo
- Cinematography: João Stamato
- Distributed by: Amazônia Filme
- Release date: 28 January 1920
- Country: Brazil
- Language: Silent

Convém Martelar is a 1920 Brazilian silent film directed by and starring Manuel F. Araujo.

The film premiered on 28 January 1920 in Rio de Janeiro.

== Cast ==
- Manuel F. Araujo
- Carlos Barbosa
- Adhemar Gonzaga
- António Silva
- Josefina Silva
- Albino Vidal
