= Miguel Palha =

Portuguese footballer

Miguel Ângelo Torres Palha (born 26 February 1995) is a Portuguese footballer who plays as a goalkeeper for Luxembourgish club FC Alisontia Steinsel.

== Career ==
On 18 March 2015, Palha made his professional debut with Vitória Guimarães B in a 2014–15 Segunda Liga match against Olhanense.
