= Cine Rialto =

Cinema in Barquisimeto, Lara, Venezuela

Coordinates: 10.06742°N 69.32047°W

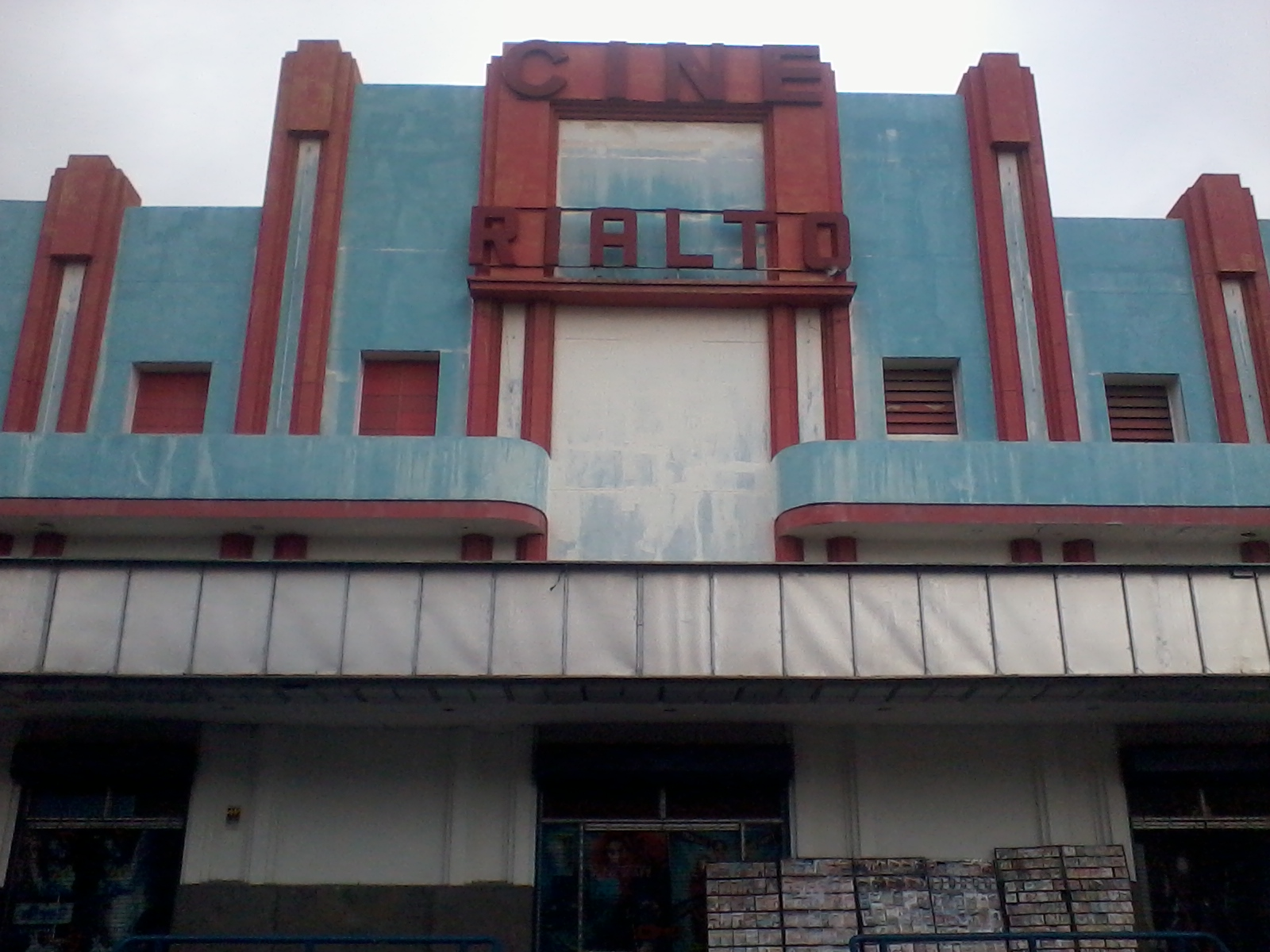
Cine Rialto, Venezuela

Cine Rialto was one of the most historic theaters cinemas in Barquisimeto, capital of Lara state, in western center of Venezuela.

It operated almost continuously for 70 years. For several years, it was renowned as one of the best cinemas in Barquisimeto, specializing in screening the latest Hollywood releases in the highest quality. It also stands out for being the only theater that did not close permanently with the rise of shopping center multiplexes.
