= Joana Palha =

Portuguese neuroscientist (born 1969)

- Born: Joana Almeida Palha; 1969 (age 56–57); Portugal
- Occupation: Neuroscientist
- Known for: Studies on impact of iodine nutrition and thyroid on the brain

Joana Palha (born 1969) is a neuroscientist and professor at the School of Medicine of the University of Minho, in Braga in the north of Portugal.

== Training ==
Between 1988 and 1991, Joana Almeida Palha took an undergraduate degree in biochemistry at the University of Porto. This was followed by a PhD from the Abel Salazar Biomedical Sciences Institute of the University of Porto between 1992 and 1995, with the work being carried out at Columbia University in New York City. Between 2014 and 2016, she took a master's in public health (epidemiology) at the Karolinska Institute in Stockholm.

== Career ==
Palha is a neuroscientist whose work has focused mainly on iodine nutrition, endocrinology (thyroid), pregnancy, ageing and the barriers of the brain. She began working in New York in 1995 as a post-doctoral fellow at the New York University Medical Center, after completing her PhD. From 1996 to 1999, she was an assistant professor at the Instituto Superior de Ciências da Saúde Egas Moniz in Gandra, Portugal. She then moved to the Instituto de Biologia Molecular e Celular in Porto before, in 2001, joining the University of Minho medical school as an assistant professor. She was made an associate professor in 2005 and promoted to full professor in 2010. From 2013 to 2015, Palha was a visiting scientist at the Ageing Research Centre of the Karolinska Institute.

Palha's studies on thyroid hormones during pregnancy contributed to the current Portuguese guidelines for iodine supplementation to pregnant women. She is a member of a wide range of medical organizations, on which she has served as a member of the board or of various committees, including the Society for Neuroscience in Washington D.C., the International Brain Research Organization in Paris, the Scientific Council of the Fundação para a Ciência e Tecnologia (Foundation for Science and Technology – FCT), which is the organization in Portugal that decides on funding allocation for research, and on the committee of senior officials for the European Cooperation in Science and Technology (COST). She has been a member of the jury of several international prizes.

In addition to the FCT, Palha has also reviewed project proposals for international funding agencies such as the European Commission; the National Science Foundation, USA; the Alzheimer's Research Foundation; and the Fulbright Program. She is an associate editor of Frontiers in Molecular Neuroscience, Journal of Molecular Neuroscience and Neurology, Psychiatry and Brain Research and is a reviewer for several other journals.

== Publications ==
Palha has been an author or co-author of over one hundred peer-reviewed journal articles. Those for which she has been the sole or lead author include:

- JA Palha, AB Goodman, Thyroid hormones and retinoids: a possible link between genes and environment in schizophrenia. Brain research reviews 51 (1), 61–71
- JA Palha Transthyretin as a thyroid hormone carrier: function revisited. Walter de Gruyter 40 (12), 1292–1300
- JA Palha et al. Thyroid hormone distribution in the mouse brain: the role of transthyretin. Neuroscience 113 (4), 837–847
- JA Palha et al. Transthyretin is not essential for thyroxine to reach the brain and other tissues in transthyretin-null mice. American Journal of Physiology. Endocrinology and Metabolism 272 (3)
- JA Palha et al. Transthyretin regulates thyroid hormone levels in the choroid plexus, but not in the brain parenchyma: study in a transthyretin-null mouse model. Endocrinology 141 (9), 3267–3272
- JA Palha et al. Transthyretin gene in Alzheimer's disease patients. Neuroscience letters 204 (3), 212-214
