= Marcus Vinícius Dias =

Brazilian basketball player

Personal information
- Born: 22 January 1923 Rio de Janeiro, Brazil
- Died: 1992 (aged 68–69)
Medals
Men's basketball
Representing Brazil
Olympic Games
Bronze medal – third place	1948 London	Team

Marcus Vinícius Dias (22 January 1923 – 1992), also commonly known as Marcus Vinícius, was a Brazilian Olympic basketball player.

Dias was born in Rio de Janeiro, and competed in the 1948 Summer Olympics. There he won the bronze medal with the Brazilian basketball team under the guidance of head coach Moacyr Daiuto.
