= Um Crime no Parque Paulista =

1921 film directed by Arturo Carrari

- Directed by: Arturo Carrari
- Written by: Arturo Carrari
- Produced by: Francisco Matarazzo
- Starring: Nicola Tartaglione
- Cinematography: José Carrari
- Distributed by: Escola de Artes Cinematográficas Azurra
- Release date: 20 December 1921
- Country: Brazil
- Language: Silent

Um Crime no Parque Paulista is a 1921 Brazilian mystery film directed by Arturo Carrari. It was the first film cinematographer José Carrari worked on, beginning a decade-long collaboration between the two until Arturo's final film, Anchieta Entre o Amor e a Religião, in 1932.
