= Cavaleiro Negro =

1923 film by Luiz de Barros

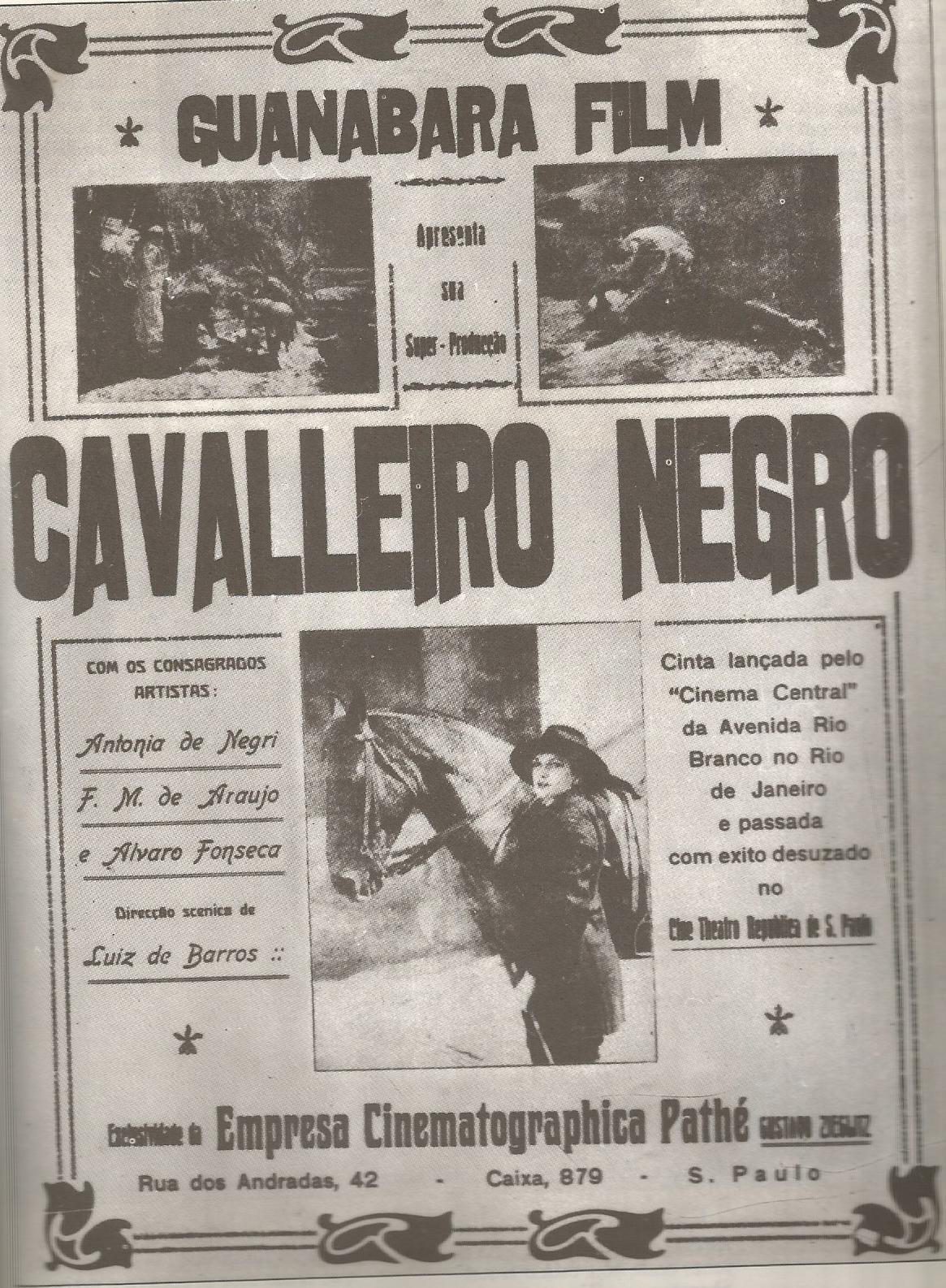
- Directed by: Luiz de Barros
- Written by: Luiz de Barros
- Produced by: Luiz de Barros
- Starring: Augusto Aníbal, Manuel F. Araujo
- Cinematography: Luiz de Barros
- Edited by: Luiz de Barros
- Distributed by: Guanabara Filmes
- Release date: 1923
- Country: Brazil
- Language: Silent

Cavaleiro Negro is a 1923 Brazilian silent adventure film directed by Luiz de Barros. The film premiered in Rio de Janeiro on 15 January 1923.

== Cast ==
- Augusto Aníbal
- Manuel F. Araujo
- Antônia Denegri
- Alvaro Fonseca
- Alfredo Marzullo
- Francisco Pezzi
