= Colégio Campos Salles =

Private school in São Paulo, Brazil

Complexo Educacional Campos Salles is a Brazilian private elementary and high school located in the city of São Paulo. It was founded in 1924 (101 years ago) by Professor Augusto Guzzo. In 1971 (54 years ago), the college Faculdades Integradas Campos Salles was founded as an extension to the school. Campos Salles has a scholarship program, offering scholarships for teenage sports players.
