= Basilica of Our Lady of Lourdes, Belo Horizonte =

Coordinates: 19.9286°S 43.9389°W

Basilica of Our Lady of Lourdes
- Basílica de Nossa Senhora de Lourdes
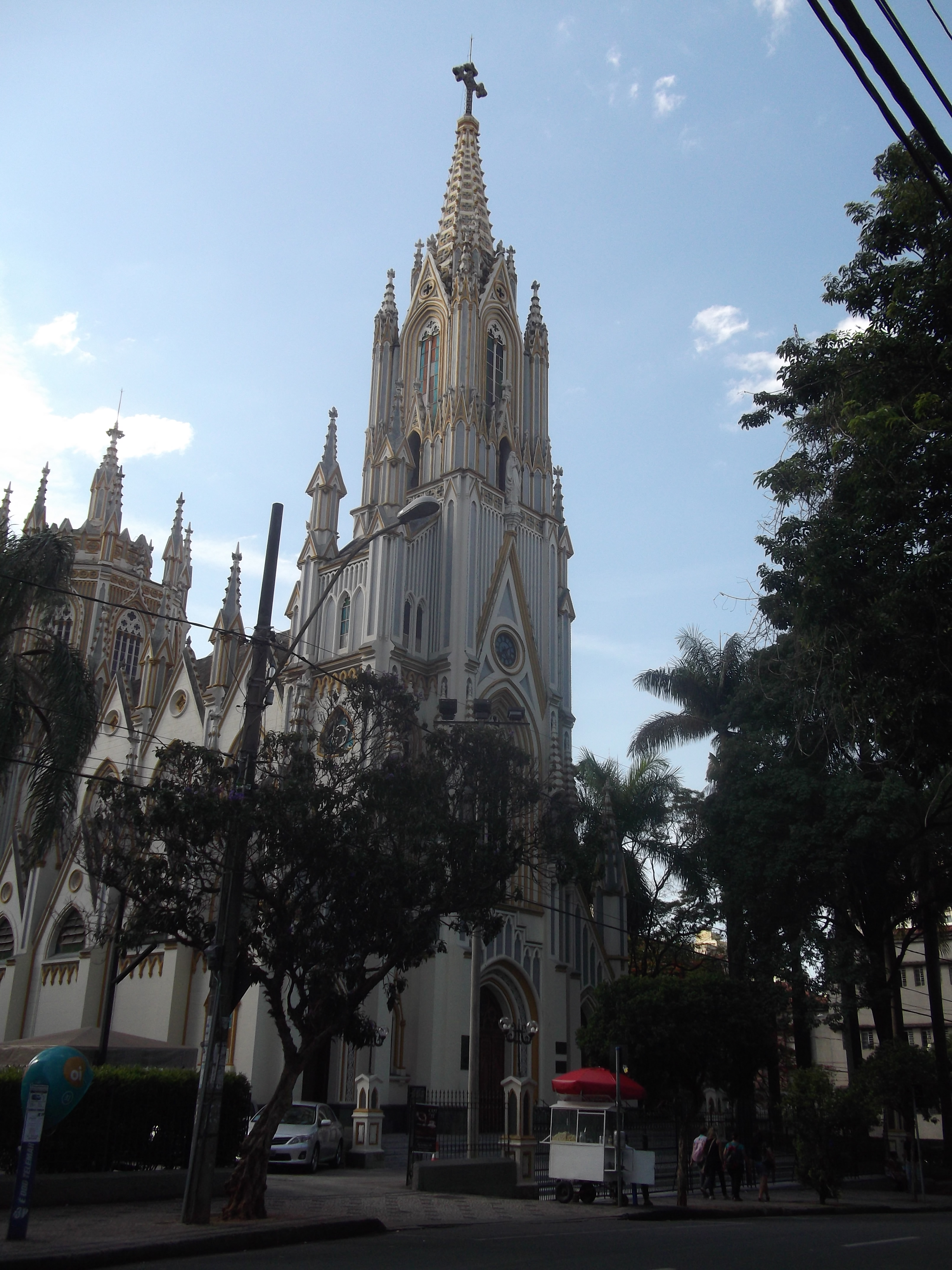
- Basilica of Our Lady of Lourdes
- Location: Belo Horizonte
- Country: Brazil
- Denomination: Roman Catholic Church

Aerial view of the Basílica de Nossa Senhora de Lourdes in the Lourdes neighborhood of Belo Horizonte

The Basilica of Our Lady of Lourdes (Portuguese: Basílica de Nossa Senhora de Lourdes), also known as the Basilica of Belo Horizonte, is a Catholic church built in a predominantly neo-Gothic style, which is located in Belo Horizonte, Brazil. Its construction was completed around 1923. The author of the project was Manoel Tunes, and the works were made by Antonio Gonçalves Gravatá. In 1958 he was elevated to Basilica by decision of Pope Pius XII.

The Church has three naves and has a length of 47 meters in length and 17 in width. In the interior there are three images of the Virgin Mary in her invocation of Our Lady of Lourdes, A wooden one, usually used in processions and coronations; A sculpted one in plaster, more than 100 years old, that is in the Grotto of Lourdes and another on the altar, which was brought from Rio de Janeiro on the occasion of the consecration of the church to the status of basilica, an act formally made in 1958.

== See also ==
- Roman Catholicism in Brazil
- Our Lady of Lourdes

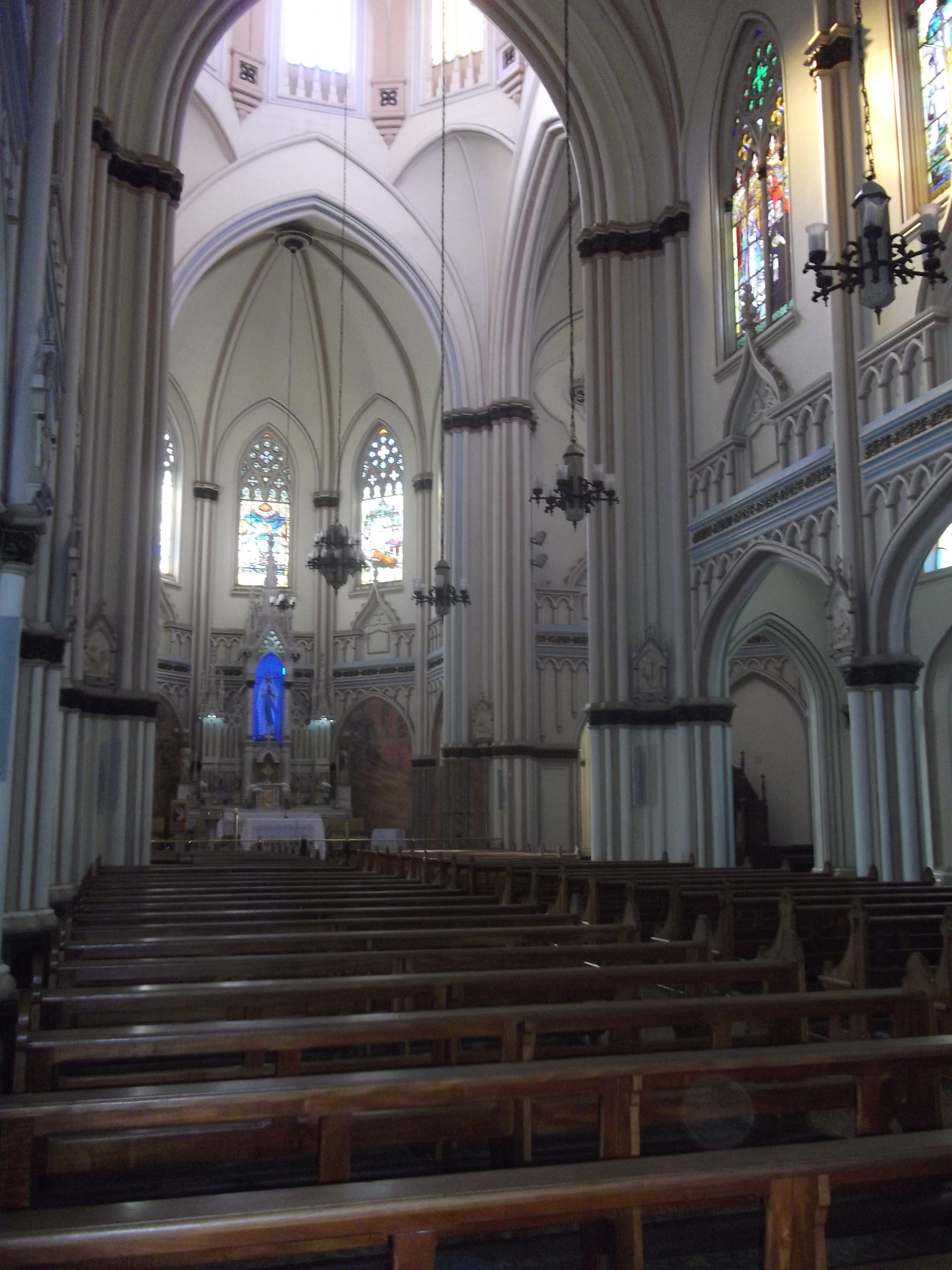
Internal View
