= Os Faroleiros =

1920 film directed by Miguel Milano

- Directed by: Antônio Leite and Miguel Milano
- Written by: Monteiro Lobato
- Produced by: João Beloise, Antônio Campos, Crispin de Carvalho, Antônio Leite, Miguel Milano
- Starring: Manuel F. Araujo
- Cinematography: Antônio Campos
- Distributed by: Romeiros do Progresso
- Release date: 11 March 1920
- Country: Brazil
- Language: Silent

Os Faroleiros is a 1920 Brazilian silent drama film directed by Antônio Leite and Miguel Milano. The film is based on the short story "Os Faroleiros" ("The Lighthouse Keepers") from the book Urupês by Monteiro Lobato.

The film was premiered on 11 March 1920 in Rio de Janeiro.
