= Do Rio a São Paulo Para Casar =

1922 film directed by José Medina

- Directed by: José Medina
- Written by: José Medina
- Produced by: Gilberto Rossi
- Cinematography: Gilberto Rossi
- Distributed by: Nello de Rossi Filmes
- Release date: 30 April 1922
- Country: Brazil
- Language: Silent

Do Rio a São Paulo Para Casar (From Rio to Sao Paulo to get married) is a 1922 Brazilian silent romance film directed by José Medina.

The film premiered on 30 April 1922 in Rio de Janeiro.

== Cast ==
- Waldemar Moreno
- Antônio Marques Costa Filho
- Nicola Tartaglione
- Maria Fuína
- Regina Fuína
- Carlos Ferreira
- J. Guedes de Castro
- José Medina
