= Carlitinhos =

1921 film

- Directed by: José Medina
- Written by: José Medina
- Produced by: Gilberto Rossi
- Cinematography: Gilberto Rossi
- Distributed by: Nello de Rossi Filmes
- Release date: 27 October 1921
- Running time: 20 minutes
- Country: Brazil
- Language: Silent

Carlitinhos is a 1921 Brazilian short film comedy directed by José Medina.

== Cast ==
- José Vassalo Jr.
- Carlos Ferreira
- Antônio Degani
