= A Canção da Primavera =

1923 film

- Directed by: Igino Bonfioli; Cyprien Segur
- Written by: Aníbal Matos
- Produced by: Igino Bonfioli; Odilardo Costa
- Cinematography: Igino Bonfioli
- Edited by: Luiz de Barros
- Distributed by: Bonfioli Filmes
- Release date: 24 July 1923
- Country: Brazil
- Language: Silent

A Canção da Primavera is a 1923 Brazilian silent romantic drama film directed by Igino Bonfioli and Cyprien Segur.

The film premiered in Rio de Janeiro on 24 July 1923.

== Plot ==
The film is set in Minas Gerais in the 19th century, as it the story of a powerful farmer Luiz Roldão who attempts to force a marriage between his son Jorge and Rosita, from the Bento's family, to unite their families for economic reasons. However, Jorge falls in loves with Lina.

== Cast ==
- Ari de Castro Viana as Luiz Roldão
- Odilardo Costa as Jorge
- Iracema Aleixo as Lina
- Naná Andrade as Lili
- Lucinda Barreto as Rosita
- Osiris Colombo as Padre Belisário
- Clementino Dotti as Dr. Carlos
- Alberto Gomes as Juca Barbeiro
- Nina Gomes as Salustiana
