= Do Risos e Lagrimas =

1926 film

- Spanish DVD cover
- Directed by: Alberto Traversa
- Written by: Genofre Werneck
- Cinematography: João Tavares de Sá
- Distributed by: S.P.E.S.
- Release date: 25 August 1926
- Country: Brazil
- Language: Silent

Do Risos e Lagrimas is a 1926 Brazilian drama film directed by Alberto Traversa.

The film premiered in Rio de Janeiro on 25 August 1926.

== Cast ==
- Eduardo Arouca as João de Souza
- João Baldi
- Túlia Burlini
- Virgínia Cassoval
- Anita Henrys as Ophelia
- Daniel Herlink
- N. Jacobson as Apolinário
- Guy Leal as Simões
- A. Longari
- Luiz Gonzaga Martins
- Inah Renlow as Inah
- Aldo Rine as Fernando
- Luiz Roberto
- Alberto Traversa
