= O Segredo do Corcunda =

1924 film

- Directed by: Alberto Traversa
- Written by: João Cipriano
- Produced by: João Cipriano, Francisco García
- Cinematography: Gilberto Rossi
- Distributed by: Nello de Rossi Filmes
- Release date: 1924
- Running time: 50 minutes
- Country: Brazil
- Language: Silent

O Segredo do Corcunda is a 1924 Brazilian silent crime film directed by Alberto Traversa.

The film premiered on 24 December 1924 in Rio de Janeiro.

== Cast ==
- João Cipriano as João
- Inocência Colado as Rosa
- Filomeno Collado as Carlos
- Rafaela Collado as Dolores
- Anunciata Madrigano
- Francisco Madrigano as Pedro
- Rosário Madrigano
- Benedito Ortiz as Bento
- Nino Ponti
- Enne Traversa
