= O Trem da Morte =

1924 film directed by José del Picchia

- Directed by: José del Picchia
- Written by: José del Picchia
- Produced by: Waldemar Dória, Victor del Picchia
- Cinematography: Antonio Medeiros
- Production company: Hélios Filme
- Release date: 5 December 1924
- Country: Brazil
- Language: Silent

O Trem da Morte (also known as A Metralha no Sertão Paulista and Coluna da Morte) is a 1924 Brazilian film directed by José del Picchia, and starring Olga Navarro. It was produced by Hélios Filme. It is a semidocumentary film, which use real scenes, of the Revolution of 1924—a lieutenant revolt in São Paulo.

The film premiered on 5 December 1924 in São Paulo.

== Cast ==
- Arturo Carrari
- José Carrari
- Carmo Nacarato
- Olga Navarro
- Nicola Tartaglione as João Cabanas
