= Pan-American Treaty (1923) =

1923 multilateral treaty of the Americas

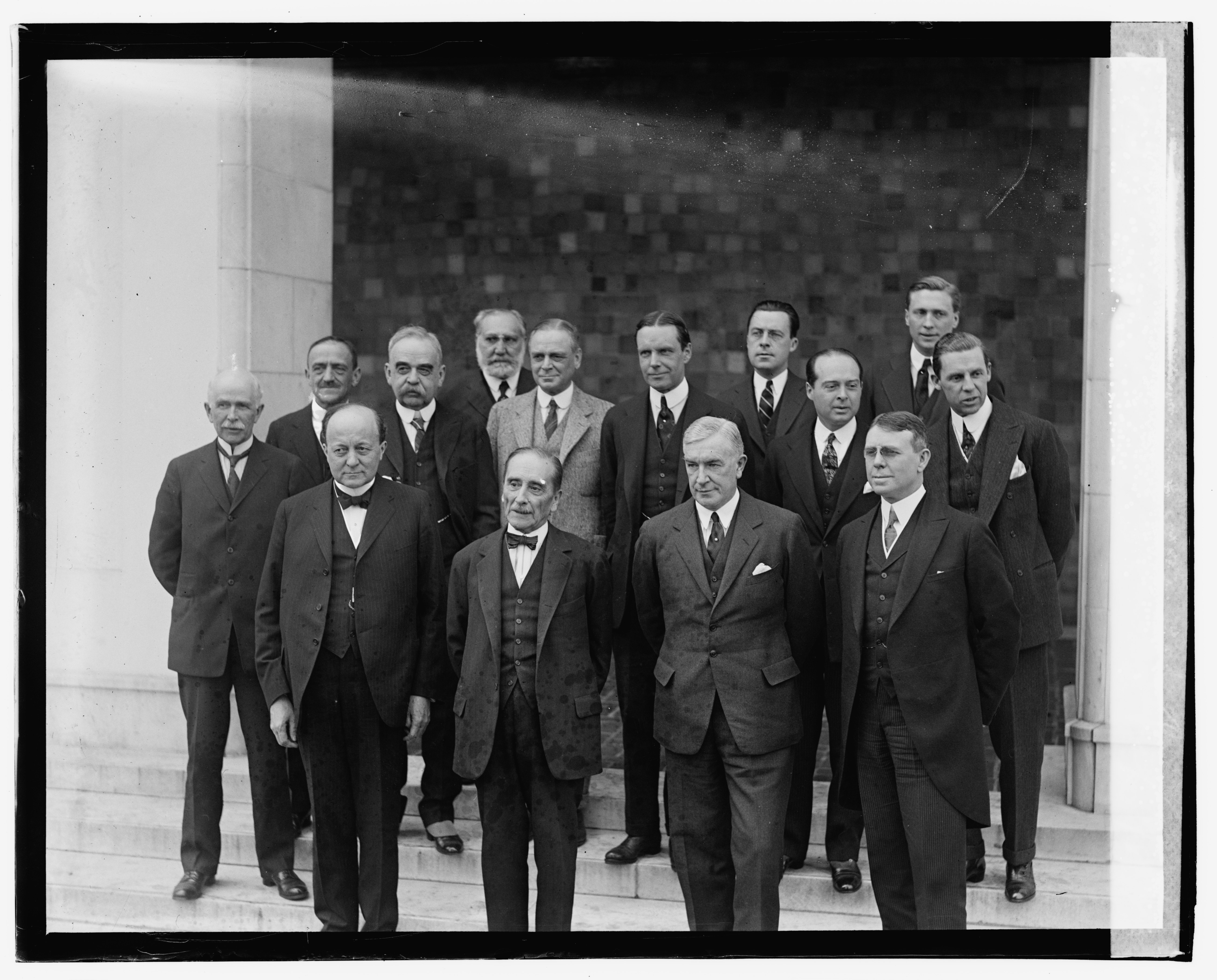
American delegates at the Fifth International Conference in Chile

The 1923 Pan American Treaty to avoid or prevent conflicts between the American States (Gondra Treaty) was signed at the Fifth International Conference of American States in Santiago, Chile, on May 3, 1923. It was signed by the governments of Argentina, Brazil, Chile, Colombia, Cuba, Dominican Republic, Ecuador, Guatemala, Haiti, Honduras, Nicaragua, Panama, Paraguay, United States, Uruguay and Venezuela. The treaty consisted of ten articles and provided for the establishment of a Pan-American commission of inquiry to investigate all grievances between American states. It obliged all American states to refrain from any mobilization of their armed forces against one another even in the worst case of disagreement in all matters. It was registered in League of Nations Treaty Series on March 3, 1925.

== Legacy of the treaty ==
The treaty was a step in a series of international efforts taken to prevent future wars, which culminated at the Kellogg-Briand Pact.

== See also ==
- Kellogg–Briand Pact
