= Coração de Gaúcho =

1920 film directed by Luiz de Barros

- Directed by: Luiz de Barros
- Written by: José de Alencar (novel)
- Produced by: Luiz de Barros
- Starring: Manuel F. Araujo
- Cinematography: João Stamato Luiz de Barros
- Edited by: Luiz de Barros
- Distributed by: Guanabara Filmes
- Release date: 26 April 1920
- Country: Brazil
- Language: Silent

Coração de Gaúcho is a 1920 Brazilian silent drama film directed by and starring Luiz de Barros. The film is based on the novel O gaúcho by José de Alencar.

The film premiered on 26 April 1920 in Rio de Janeiro and stars Manuel F. Araujo and António Silva.

== Cast ==
- Manuel F. Araujo
- Luiz de Barros
- Antônia Denegri
- Alvaro Fonseca
- Cândida Leal
- António Silva
