= Fragments of Life =

1929 Brazilian silent drama film

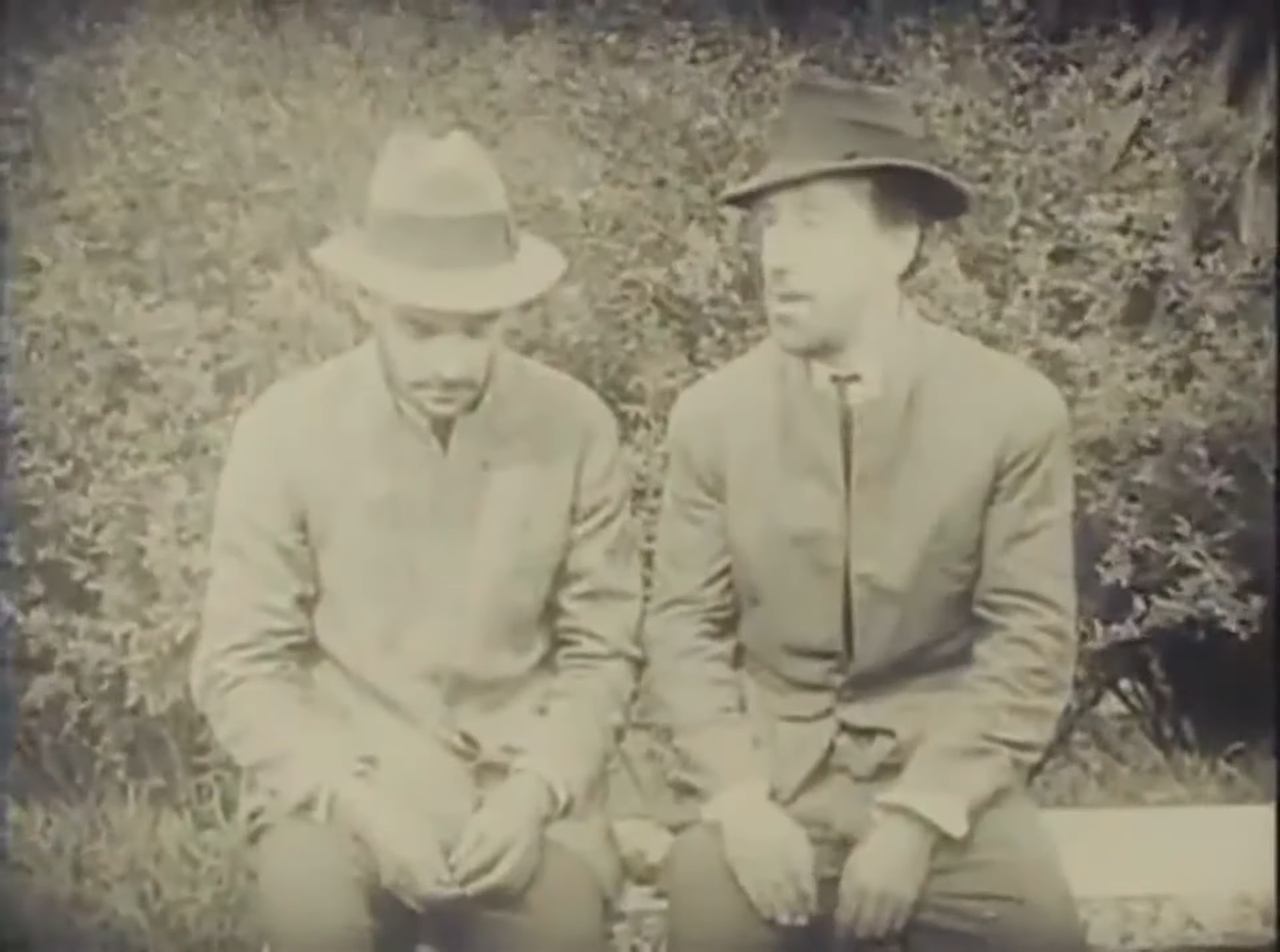
- Carlos Ferreira and Alfredo Roussy in a scene from the film
- Directed by: José Medina
- Written by: José Medina
- Produced by: Rossi-Film
- Starring: Áurea de Aremar; Carlos Ferreira; Alfredo Roussy; José Medina Filho
- Cinematography: Gilberto Rossi
- Distributed by: Rossi-Film
- Release dates: April 15, 1929; (Cine Odeon, RJ)
- Running time: 40 minutes
- Country: Brazil
- Language: Silent (Portuguese intertitles)
- Budget: 60000 réis

Fragments of Life (Brazilian Portuguese: Fragmentos da vida) is a 1929 Brazilian silent drama film directed by José Medina. It was the last production of Rossi-Film and was acclaimed as "the most daring portrait of Brazilian urban life" (Cinearte, April 1929), and is today considered a pioneering work of national cinematographic realism.

Scene from Fragments of Life

== Plot ==
Fragmentos da vida tells the story of two vagabonds living by petty crimes in the streets of São Paulo. In his childhood, one of them witnesses his father's death, a construction worker who falls from scaffolding. Before dying, the father advises him on honesty and work as the only true values of men. However, over time, the boy, now a young man, an operator, becomes a vagabond and is arrested by the police for not having a place to spend the winter.

With this intention, the vagabond, along with a friend, carries out a series of petty crimes, but chance always offers a conciliatory solution. In a restaurant, he tries to eat without paying, but a solidary citizen prevents the police from being called and pays for the meal. In the next adventure, the character breaks a shop window and confesses the act to the owner, but the owner, doubting his frankness, looks for another culprit. A new petty crime is rehearsed. On a street watched by a policeman, the protagonist suddenly embraces a young woman who, to his surprise, reciprocates the gesture and thanks him for the approach; both are then ostentatiously followed by suspicious men. Disconsolate, the vagabond and his companion continue to wander until they stand before a church. The vagabond enters, and the priest's discourse evokes his father's last advice. He leaves the church emotional, willing to reform, but is finally arrested by the police for a crime he did not commit. An intertitle announces his suicide.

== Cast ==
- Áurea de Aremar as Moça (Young Woman)
- Carlos Ferreira as Operário; Vagabundo (Worker; Vagabond)
- Alfredo Roussy as Malandro (Rascal)
- José Medina Filho as Vagabundo when child (Vagabond as a child)

== Rediscovery ==
- 1997: Included in the "Lost Cinema of the Americas" exhibition at MoMA.
- 2002: Digital restoration of the 3 surviving stills by MIS-RJ.

== Legacy ==
Despite the historical erasure and the loss of most of its footage, Fragmentos da Vida is today recognized by critics and historians as a landmark of realism in Brazilian cinema, being compared with the aesthetics and technique of director D. W. Griffith.

It inspired scenes from Rio, 40 Graus (1955) and Aruanda (1960), according to testimonies by Nelson Pereira dos Santos and Linduarte Noronha.

Reference in the Cinema Novo manifesto (1962) as a "precursor of social realism".

== Reception ==
The incorporation by Fragmentos da Vida of current elements in North American cinema was celebrated by Guilherme de Almeida (1890-1969), a critic recognized for his severity in national filmmaking. He says, "José Medina is indisputably, for now, our only true director." Another São Paulo critic, Octavio Gabus Mendes (1906-1946), also hailed the film, albeit with less enthusiasm: "(...) very much although it focuses on few beautiful aspects of our modern São Paulo, even so it is a film full of pleasant adventures." The critic refers to the treatment given to central points of the city, such as Parque Dom Pedro II, the Martinelli Building, and Vale do Anhangabaú. Critic Pedro Lima (1902-1987) projects into the future the importance of the feature: "This year, with A Escrava Isaura screened in the Capitólio and Fragmentos da Vida in the red room of Cine Odeon in São Paulo, our cinematographic year closes so auspiciously that we have nothing else to ask for."

Its narrative qualities are added to the progressive aspiration of the city of São Paulo. According to Machado, it is possible to glimpse a desire for modernization that the film praises. The moral tone that involves the discourse on the evils of vagrancy is characteristic of the ideology of work developed in the city. Letters appear in it that exalt an urban life, an organization of the city and a belief in institutions, such as the state penitentiary, which arises in history as a better place than the streets in winter. The plans of the central buildings, after the initial sequence in Parque D. Pedro II, evoke the images of São Paulo, Sinfonia de uma Metrópole, by Adalberto Kemeny (1901-1970) and Rodolfo Rex Lustig (1901-1970).

A Noite: "Impeccable technique and moving social portrait" (April 15, 1929, p. 5).

Correio da Manhã: "Surpasses in humanity many foreign films" (April 16, 1929, p. 4).

Cinearte: "Medina elevates national cinema to a new level" (April 1929, p. 12).

== Bibliography ==
- Bernardet, Jean-Claude (1997). Fragmentos da Vida: um filme esquecido (Fragments of Life: a forgotten film). São Paulo: Editora XXX.
- Revista de Cinema (Cinema Magazine) (2005). "Realismo e pioneirismo em Fragmentos da Vida" (Realism and pioneering spirit in Fragments of Life).
- Manifesto do Cinema Novo (Cinema Novo Manifesto) (1962). link
