= Augusto Anibal quer casar =

1923 film

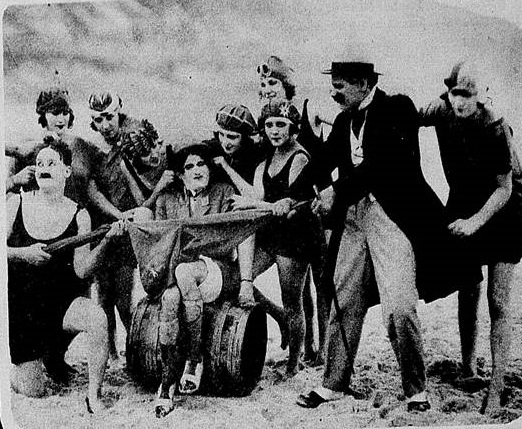
- Photo of some of the cast
- Directed by: Luiz de Barros
- Written by: Carlos Verga, Vittorio Verga
- Produced by: Luiz de Barros
- Cinematography: Luiz de Barros
- Edited by: Luiz de Barros
- Distributed by: Guanabara Filmes
- Release date: 1923
- Country: Brazil
- Language: Silent

Augusto Anibal quer casar is a 1923 Brazilian silent comedy film directed by Luiz de Barros and Vittorio Verga, based on a short story written by Carlos Verga. It is considered a lost film. It premiered in Brazil in September 1923.

Brazilian researcher Antônio Leão da Silva Neto, wrote in his book Dicionário de filmes brasileiros: longa-metragem, that the film is a feature film. Among the figures present in the cast stand out Augusto Annibal, Yara Jordão, named at the time as the "queen of Copacabana" and the actor Darwin, known as an "imitator of women".

According to O Imparcial, the screenings exceeded expectations at the brazilian Parisience Theater box office. It is the first Brazilian movie to talk about homosexuality and transsexuality.

== Plot ==
As described in Brazilian magazine A Scena Muda: Augusto Annibal is a young man with a burning heart who wants to get married. He leaves to willingly marry the first girl he meets, when he sees Yara Jordan. He starts to follow her in his car, she notices and walks away, but he continues to insist. She meets Viola Diva and other girls in a car, which takes her to Gazea beach.

Augusto follows her and after a disastrous incident with the car that appears on the beach, the girls go to help him. Even younger, he begins to have delusion with the girls that when they appear dancing or insinuating themselves towards him, he wakes up and begins to be chased by several bearded men.

Back in town, the girls decide that they are going to help him find a bride, they go to Darwin's house (a boy) who pretends to be a beautiful woman, they write to him that the wedding will only happen if he accepts it right away. He runs to Darwin's house, after facing several sacrifices, also arranging for a priest. Darwin begins to walk like a man in front of Annibal and when he realizes he leaves desperate realizing the situation in which he found himself. He finds an airplane and decides to look for his bride in the sky.

== Cast ==
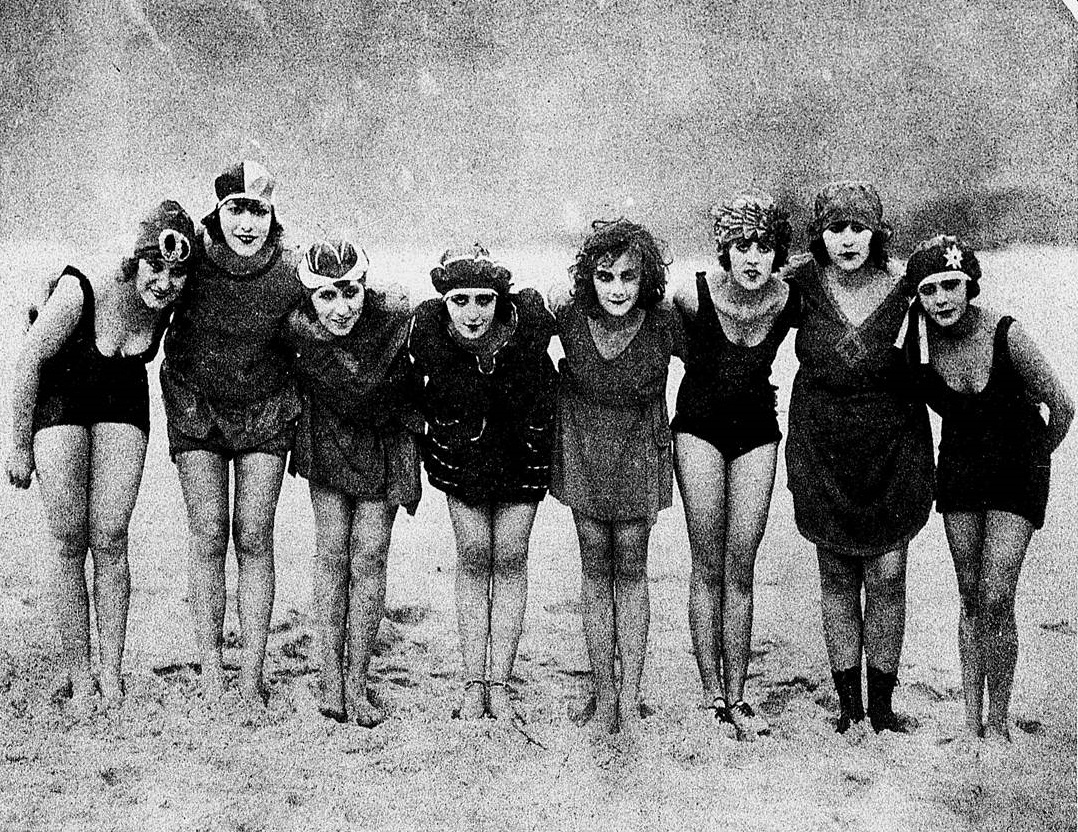
Photo of the female cast of Augusto Annibal Quer Casar.

From the Brazilian magazine A Scena Muda.

- Augusto Aníbal
- Manuel F. Araujo
- Barcklay
- Yara Brasil
- Régina Dalthy
- Darwin
- Nair de Almeida
- Viola Diva
- Andre Fix
- Harry Flemming
- Hackeron
- Yara Jordão
- Lafant
- Cândido Palácios
- Manoel Pinto
- Poupin
- Suzy
- Albino Vidal

== Reception ==
The reviews from the movie critics were mostly positive. The newspaper A Rúa considered the production "very funny" and "a masterpiece", however, in its September 11, 1923 issue, it criticized the promotional poster which, according to it, contained "a group of women in smaller costumes, almost naked, one of which lifts its legs over the head of a squatting man (..) who exclaims:-What a smell of Ba-Ta-Clan!.

The periodical O Jornal, made two reviews, the first one issued on September 9, 1923, claimed to be the best release in the comedy genre produced in the country so far and that Augusto Annibal's performance was on a par with Charlie Chaplin's. In the second, Mendes Fradique wrote even though it was "far from satisfying the demands of the technical spectators", the talent of the cast was worth the ticket price.

The newspaper A União, wrote in its October 18, 1923 edition, that Guanabara-Film was not happy with the presentation, with the technical part presenting problems worthy of beginners, he also criticized the movie theme (called the film "pervert") and pointed out that it was not suitable for younger people, as it could cause psychological damage.
