= Quando Elas Querem =

1925 film

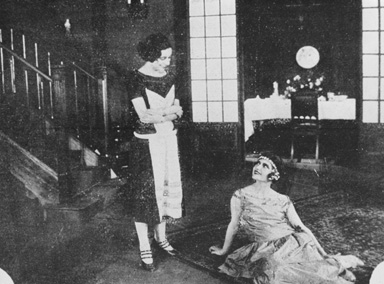
- Directed by: Eugenio Centenaro Kerrigan, Paolo Trinchera
- Written by: Adalberto de Almada Fagundes, Eugenio Centenaro Kerrigan
- Produced by: Adalberto de Almada Fagundes, Eugenio Centenaro Kerrigan
- Starring: Luiz de Barros
- Cinematography: Luiz de Barros
- Release date: 1925
- Country: Brazil
- Language: Silent

Quando Elas Querem is a 1925 Brazilian comedy film directed by Eugenio Centenaro Kerrigan.

The film premiered in Rio de Janeiro on 9 December 1925.

== Cast ==
- Bertoli Carmelo as Alberto
- Luiz de Barros
- César Fronzi
- Yolanda Fronzi
- Regina Fuína
- Jardel Jercolis
- Laura Letti as Clarinda
- Anésia Pinheiro Machado
- Emílio Marangoni
- Mado Mirka
- Salvador Tarantino as Benedito
