= Assis Reis =

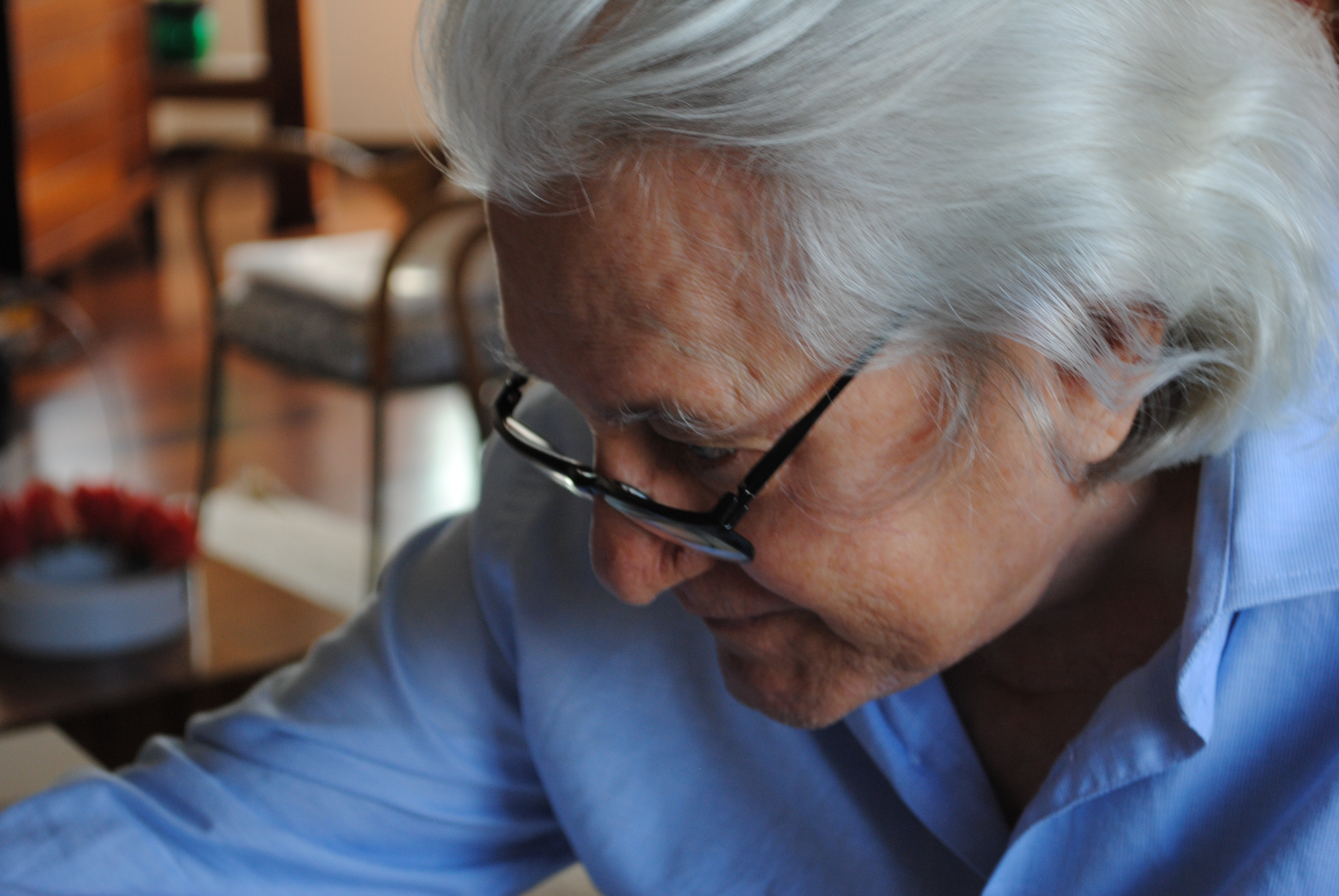
Assis Reis

Francisco de Assis Couto dos Reis ( October 24, 1926 - April 20, 2011) was a Brazilian architect and professor.

He was born in Aracaju, Sergipe, son of Mário Reis and Joana Angélica de Lima Couto dos Reis, with roots in the Brazilian cities of Parnaíba (State of Piauí) and Salvador (State of Bahia). Assis Reis, as he was better known, was considered one of the first architects of the second generation of modern architecture in Brazil, having been awarded the "Colar de Ouro" (Gold Necklace), the highest prize conferred by the Instituto de Arquitetos do Brasil (Institute of Architects of Brazil). He died in Salvador, Bahia, aged 84.

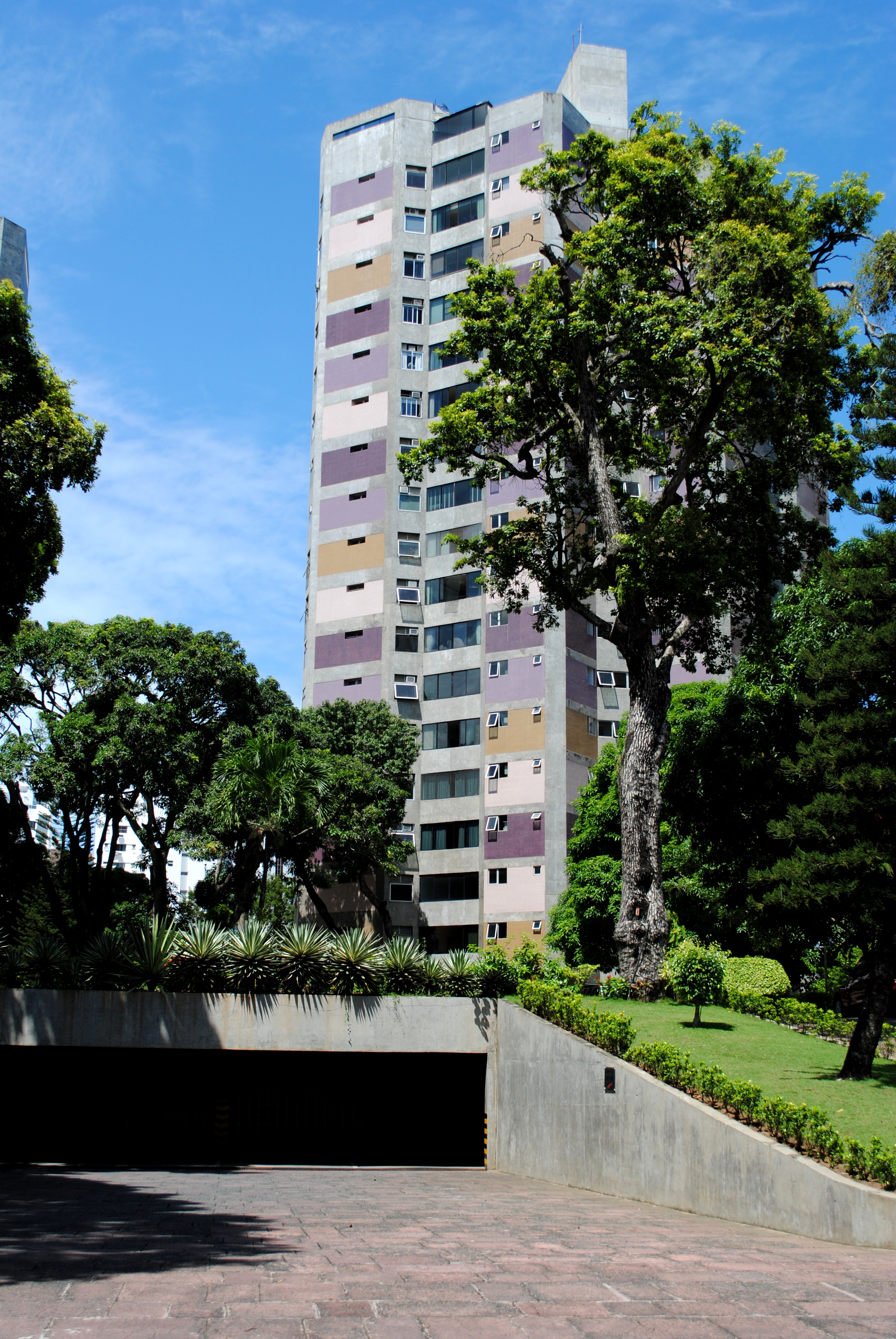
Solar das Mangueiras, Salvador, Bahia.
