= Como Deus Castiga =

1920 film

- Directed by: Antônio Leite and Miguel Milano
- Written by: Antônio Leite and Miguel Milano
- Produced by: Antônio Leite, Miguel Milano, João Beloise, Antônio Campos, Crispin de Carvalho
- Cinematography: Antonio Medeiros
- Color process: Black and White
- Distributed by: Romeiros do Progresso
- Release date: 12 July 1920
- Country: Brazil
- Language: Silent

Como Deus Castiga is a 1920 Brazilian silent drama film directed and screen written by Antônio Leite and Miguel Milano. It is based on a novel by Joaquim Manoel de Macedo.

The film premiered on 12 July 1920 in Rio de Janeiro.

== Cast ==
- Ignácio Brito
- Clarinda Lopes
