= Perdida (1916 film) =

Brazilian silent drama film by Luiz de Barros

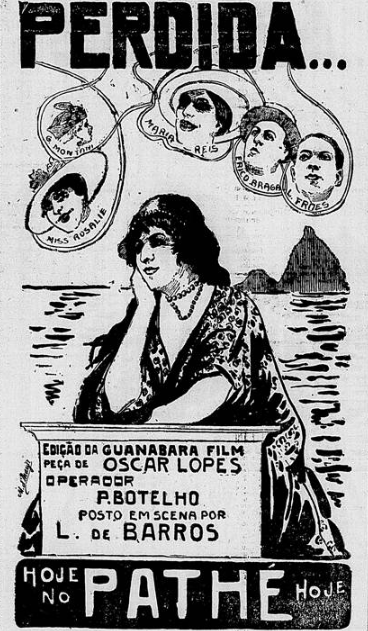
- Directed by: Luiz de Barros
- Written by: Based on a play by Oscar Lopes
- Cinematography: João Stamato, Paulino Botelho
- Production company: Guanabara Filme
- Release date: 16 October 1914
- Country: Brazil
- Language: Silent

Perdida is a 1916 Brazilian silent drama film directed by Luiz de Barros and starring Erico Braga, Yole Burlini, and Leopoldo Froes.

== Cast ==
- Erico Braga
- Yole Burlini as Nanette Lubin
- Leopoldo Froes as Ricardo de Toneleiros
- Gabriela Montani
- Maria Reis
- Miss Rosalie
