= João da Mata =

1923 film

- Directed by: Amilar Alves
- Written by: Amilar Alves, Felipe Ricci
- Produced by: Amilar Alves, Francisco Castelli, Victorino de Oliveira Prata, José Ziggiati
- Starring: Angelo Forti
- Cinematography: Thomaz de Tullio
- Edited by: Amilar Alves and Felipe Ricci
- Distributed by: Phoenix Filmes
- Release date: 9 October 1923
- Country: Brazil
- Language: Silent

João da Mata is a 1923 Brazilian silent political drama film directed by Amilar Alves.

The film premiered in Rio de Janeiro on 9 October 1923.

== Cast ==
- Amilar Alves
- Nhá Ana
- Juracy Aymoré
- Eugênio Castelli
- Moacir dos Santos
- Angelo Forti as João da Mata
- Trajano Guimarães
- Luiz Laloni
- Arnaldo Pinheiro
- Plínio Porto
- José Rodrigues
- José Ziggiati
