= As Aventuras de Gregório =

1920 film directed by Luiz de Barros

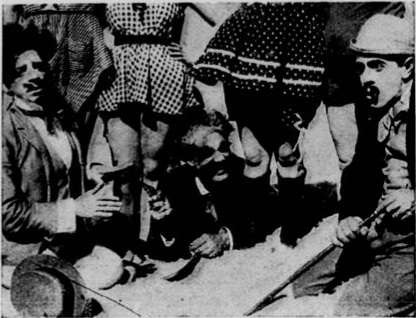
- Still
- Directed by: Luiz de Barros
- Written by: Luiz de Barros
- Produced by: Luiz de Barros
- Cinematography: Luiz de Barros
- Edited by: Luiz de Barros
- Distributed by: Guanabara Filmes
- Release date: 2 October 1920
- Country: Brazil
- Language: Silent (Portuguese intertitles)

As Aventuras de Gregório is a 1920 Brazilian silent comedy film directed by Luiz de Barros.

== Cast ==
- Manuel F. Araujo
- Ernesto Begonha
- Yole Burlini
- Alvaro Fonseca
