= Hei de Vencer =

1924 film directed by Luiz de Barros

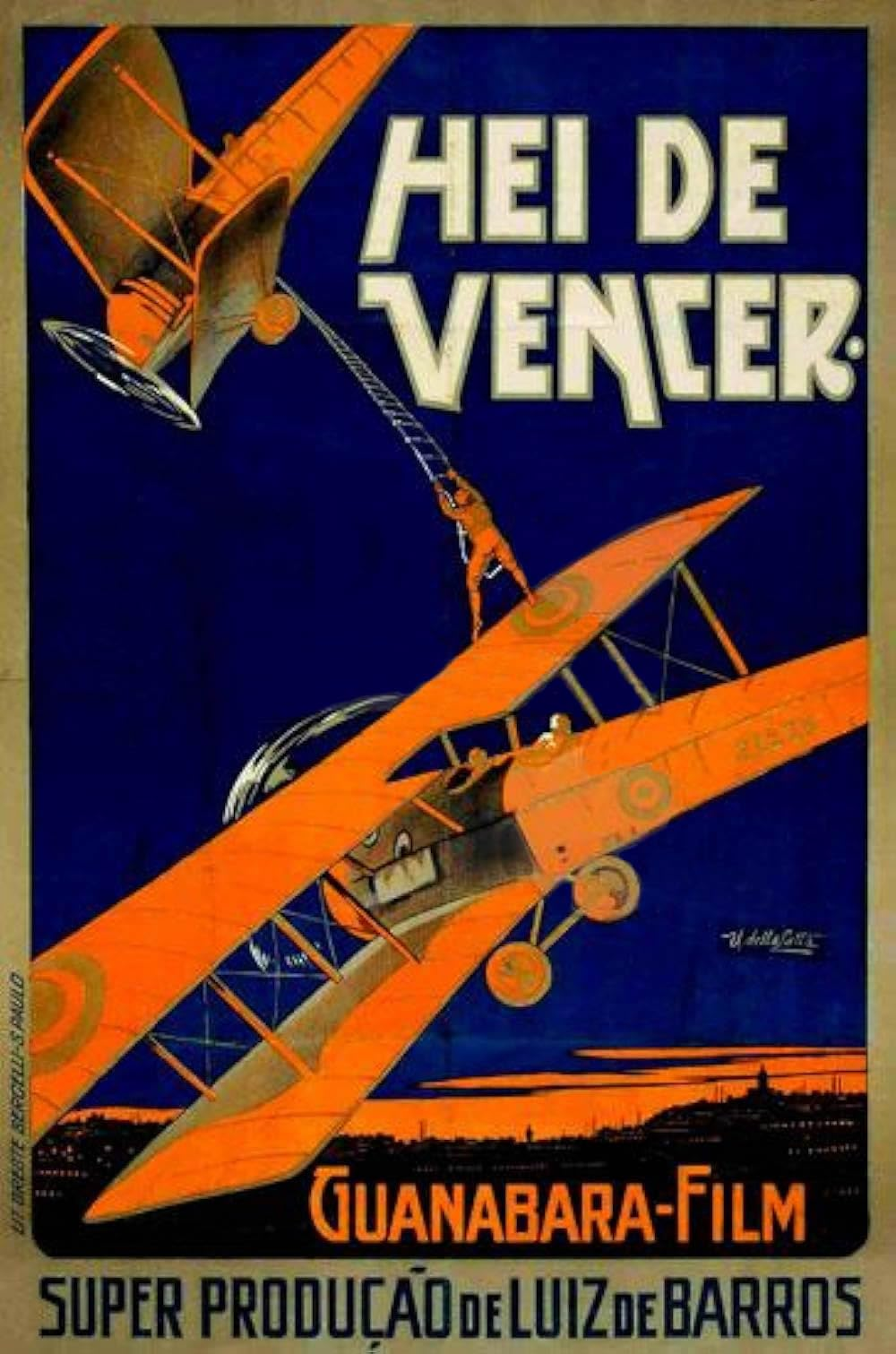
- Directed by: Luiz de Barros
- Written by: Antonio Tibiriçá (story), Luiz de Barros
- Produced by: Antonio Tibiriçá
- Cinematography: Luiz de Barros, Paulino Botelho
- Edited by: Luiz de Barros
- Distributed by: Guanabara Filmes, Pátria Filme
- Release date: 1924
- Country: Brazil
- Language: Silent

Hei de Vencer is a 1924 Brazilian silent drama film directed by Luiz de Barros.

== Cast ==
- Antonio Sorrentino as Ernesto Guimarães
- Manuel F. Araujo as Jaime Fonseca
- Laura Munken as Alice
- Adolfo Nery as Guilherme Luiz
- Antonio Tibiriçá as Alberto Junqueira (as Paulo Sullis)
- Célia Cunha as Jaime's lover
- Perle Fabry as Gaby les Fleurs
- Georgette de Lys as Alda Moreira
- César Bresciani
- Reynaldo Gonçalves
- Anésia Pinheiro Machado
- Aldo Rine
- João Robba
