= António Silva (actor) =

Portuguese actor

António Silva OSE OB
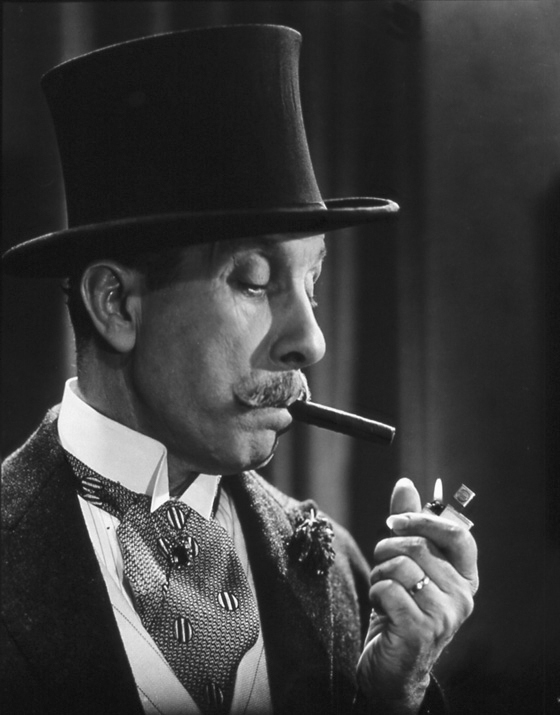
- Born: António Maria da Silva; 15 August 1886; Mercês, Lisbon, Portugal
- Died: 3 March 1971 (aged 84); Lisbon, Portugal
- Occupation: Actor
- Spouse: Josefina Barco Silva (1920–1971)

António Maria da Silva OSE OB (15 August 1886 – 3 March 1971) was a Portuguese actor. He appeared in more than 40 productions over his more than 50 years in acting.

== Early life ==
António Silva was born to a humble family, one of many sons and daughters of Francisco Constantino Augusto da Silva (born December 19, 1849, Lisbon, Socorro), a frame gilder in Lisbon, who married Amélia das Dores (July 4, 1853, Lisbon, Lumiar, – April 4, 1936, Lisbon, São Jorge de Arroios). The family lived at Rua do Jasmim nr. 5.

António was an employee at a drugstore, a cashier and a fireman, where he rose to the rank of commander, before he became an actor.

== Career ==
He studied business and took part in several amateur stage groups. His first appearance as an actor was in 1910, in the play "The New Christ", by Tolstoy, that the Alves da Silva company produced at the Teatro da Rua dos Condes. A success, he was signed to a contract, appearing in other small roles in plays such as "O Conde de Monte Cristo" or "O Rei Maldito".

Between 1913 and 1921, he travelled with the António de Sousa company across Brazil, where he starred in Brazilian silent films such as Convém Martelar and Coração de Gaúcho in 1920, and in the same year he married Josefina Barco.

On his return to Portugal, he worked for several years at the Satanella Amarante company, in light theatre plays and reviews. After working with several other theatre companies (Lopo Lauer, António de Macedo, Comediantes de Lisboa, Vasco Morgado), he finally reached the limelight of Portuguese cinema, when he joined the cast of A Canção de Lisboa, by Cottinelli Telmo in 1933. It was in movies, that his popularity and ingenuity as an actor was finally established. He performed in dramatic as well as comedic roles in over 30 films including: Wild Cattle (1934), As Pupilas do Senhor Reitor (1935), O Pátio das Cantigas (1942), O Costa do Castelo (1943), Amor de Perdição (1943), Camões (1946), O Leão da Estrela (1947), and Fado (1948). His last film performance was in 1966, in O Sarilho de Fraldas, with António Calvário and Madalena Iglésias.

== Distinctions ==
=== National orders ===
- Officer of the Order of Saint James of the Sword (4 November 1966)
- Officer of the Order of Benefaction (5 October 1936)
