= O Furto dos 500 Milhões de Réis =

1922 film directed by Arturo Carrari

- Directed by: Arturo Carrari
- Produced by: Arturo Carrari
- Cinematography: José Carrari
- Distributed by: Escola de Artes Cinematográficas Azurra
- Release date: 18 December 1922
- Country: Brazil
- Language: Silent

O Furto dos 500 Milhões de Réis is a 1922 Brazilian silent crime film directed by Arturo Carrari.

The film premiered on 18 December 1922 in Rio de Janeiro.

== Cast ==
- José Fontana
- Nicola Tartaglione
