= Manuel F. Araujo =

Brazilian actor

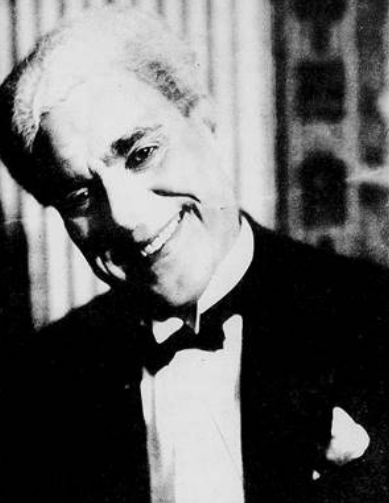
- Born: 1879; Rio de Janeiro, Brazil
- Died: 1940 (aged 60–61)
- Years active: 1919–1939

Manuel F. Araujo (1879–1940) was an early Brazilian film actor. He was prominent in Brazilian film in the 1920s and 1930s and in 1920 directed the film Convém Martelar in which he worked with the touring famous Portuguese actor António Silva.

== Filmography ==
Year	Film	Role
1919	Alma Sertaneja	Padre
1919	Ubirajara	Itaquê
1920	Convém Martelar	
1920	Coração de Gaúcho	
1920	As Aventuras de Gregório	
1923	Augusto Anibal quer casar	
1923	Cavaleiro Negro	
1923	A Capital Federal	Figueiredo
1924	Hei de Vencer	Jaime Fonseca
1929	Barro Humano	
1931	Mulher	
1933	Onde a Terra Acaba	
1936	Jovem Tataravô, O	
1936	Bonequinha de Sêda	
1937	Maria Bonita	
1939	Aves Sem Ninho	Comendador Leitão

== External links and sources ==
- Manuel F. Araujo at IMDb
