= Sofrer Para Gozar =

1923 film

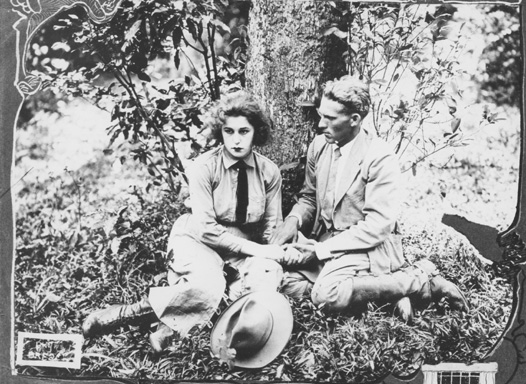
- Directed by: Eugenio Centenaro Kerrigan
- Written by: Eugenio Centenaro Kerrigan
- Produced by: Eugenio Centenaro Kerrigan
- Cinematography: Thomaz de Tullio
- Edited by: Felipe Ricci
- Distributed by: Apa Filmes
- Release date: 27 December 1923
- Country: Brazil
- Language: Silent (Portuguese intertitles)

Sofrer Para Gozar is a 1923 Brazilian silent drama film directed by Eugenio Centenaro Kerrigan.

The film premiered in Rio de Janeiro on 27 December 1923.

== Cast ==
- Cacilda Alencar as Edith Barros
- Juracy Aymoré
- João dos Santos Galvão
- Lincoln Garrido as Tim
- José Rodrigues
- Waldemar Rodrigues as Jacques Fernandes
- João Rodrigues Serra
- Otto Stange
- Ricardo Zaratini as Jayme Lourenço
