= Eugenio Centenaro Kerrigan =

- Born: Eugenio Centenaro; 1878; Modena (more likely Genova), Italy
- Died: 1956 (aged 77–78); Porto Alegre, Rio Grande do Sul, Brazil

William Gauthier better known as Eugenio Centenaro Kerrigan (1878 – December 25, 1956) was an Italian Brazilian film director and screenwriter best known for his work in the Cinema of Brazil in the 1920s. In Campinas, SP, he used to introduce himself as Count Eugenio Maria Piglione Rossiglioni de Farnet, and claimed to be born in Los Angeles in 1878.

== Selected director filmography ==
- Sofrer Para Gozar (1923)
- Quando Elas Querem (1925)
- Corações em Suplício (1926)
- Amor que Redime (1928)
- Revelação (1929)

== External links and sources ==
- Eugenio Centenaro Kerrigan at IMDb
