= Fogo de Palha =

1926 film

- Directed by: Canuto Mendes de Almeida
- Written by: Plínio de Castro Ferraz, Canuto Mendes de Almeida
- Produced by: Jaime Redondo
- Cinematography: Jaime Redondo
- Distributed by: Redondo Filmes
- Release date: 6 December 1926
- Country: Brazil
- Language: Silent

Fogo de Palha is a 1926 Brazilian drama film directed by Canuto Mendes de Almeida based on a story by Plínio de Castro Ferraz

The film premiered in Rio de Janeiro on 6 December 1926.

== Cast ==
- Vicente Bifano as Assunção
- Fernando Cardoso
- Rosa de Maio as Eulália
- Diógenes de Nioac as João Brito
- Múcio de Sèvres as Radamés
- Georgette Ferret as Helena
- Joaquim Garnier as Polidoro Soares
- J. Quental
- Lulu Melo Ramos
- Odette Redondo
