= Paulo e Virginia =

1924 film

- Directed by: Francisco de Almeida Fleming
- Written by: Henri Bernardin de Saint-Pierre (novel), Francisco de Almeida Fleming
- Produced by: Francisco de Almeida Fleming
- Cinematography: Francisco de Almeida Fleming
- Edited by: Francisco de Almeida Fleming
- Distributed by: América Filmes
- Release date: 12 August 1924
- Country: Brazil
- Language: Silent

Paulo e Virginia is a 1924 Brazilian silent drama film directed by Francisco de Almeida Fleming. It is based on a novel by Jacques-Henri Bernardin de Saint-Pierre.

The film premiered in Rio de Janeiro on 12 August 1924.

== Cast ==
- Lima Campos
- Rosalita de Oliveira
- Francisco de Almeida Fleming
- Gerônimo Magalhães
- Paulo Rosanova
