= Gigolete =

1924 film

- Directed by: Vittorio Verga
- Written by: Vittorio Verga
- Produced by: Paulo Benedetti
- Cinematography: Paulo Benedetti
- Distributed by: Benedetti Filmes, Empresa Brasileira de Filmes
- Release date: 4 June 1924
- Country: Brazil
- Language: Silent

Gigolete is a 1924 Brazilian silent drama film directed by Vittorio Verga. Most of the film has been destroyed with age although about 2 minutes of the finale has been restored today.

The film premiered in Rio de Janeiro on 4 June 1924.

== Cast ==
- Amélia de Oliveira as Liz
- Augusto Aníbal as Maneco
- Jaime Costa as Alvaro
- Arthur Oliveira as Dr. Elzeman
- Artur de Oliveira Júnior
- M. Arrisagna
- Eugênia Brasão
- Aurora Fúlgida
- Maria Grilo
- José Loureiro
- Teixeira Pinto
- Adelina Simi
- Leonel Simi
- Luiza Valle
- Célia Zanatti
