= José Medina (Brazilian filmmaker) =

Brazilian filmmaker (1893–1980)

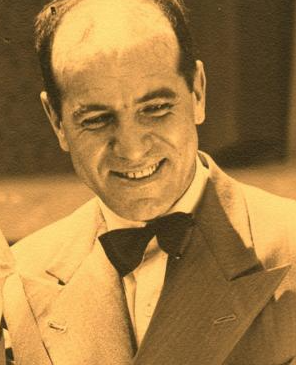
- Born: April 14, 1893; Sorocaba, Brazil
- Died: August 25, 1980 (aged 87); Sorocaba, Brazil
- Occupation: Filmmaker

José Medina (April 14, 1893 – August 25, 1980) was a Brazilian filmmaker. He was a self-taught artist-communicator and a pioneer of Brazilian silent cinema. In addition to his performance in cinema, he also worked with photography, radio, newspapers, drawing, painting, advertising and theater.

== Filmography ==
- 1919 – Exemplo regenerador
- 1919 – Quando Deus Castiga
- 1921 – Carlitinhos
- 1921 – Perversidade
- 1922 – A Culpa dos Outros
- 1922 – Do Rio a São Paulo Para Casar
- 1925 – Gigi
- 1929 – Fragments of Life
- 1943 – O Canto da Raça

== Awards and honors ==
In 1973, he received the Grand Prize of Critics, in the Cinema area, from São Paulo Art Critics Association, for his performance and relevance in Brazilian cinema. In 1977, the 10th Festival de Brasília paid tribute to José Medina. The film "Fragments of Life" was shown during the festival and an exhibition was set up about his cinematographic production. In 1980, months before his death, a tribute was made at the São Paulo Museum of Image and Sound, with the screening of two of his films.
