= Arturo Carrari =

Brazilian film director

- Born: 1867; Piezemonti, Modena
- Died: 1935 (aged 67–68)
- Years active: 1916 - 1932

Arturo Carrari (1867–1935) was an early Italian-Brazilian film director, film producer, screenwriter and occasional actor best known for his work in the Brazilian cinema in the 1920s.

== Director filmography ==
- Os Milagres de Nossa Senhora da Aparecida (1916)
- 24 Horas na Vida de Uma Mulher Elegante (1920)
- O Crime de Cravinhos (1920)
- Um Crime no Parque Paulista (1921)
- Amor de Filha (1922)
- O Furto dos 500 Milhões de Réis (1922)
- Os Milagres de Nossa Senhora da Penha (1923)
- Manhãs de Sol (1925)
- Amor de Mãe (1927)
- Anchieta Entre o Amor e a Religião (1932)
