= Luiz de Barros =

Brazilian director, producer, editor, cinematographer, actor and set designer

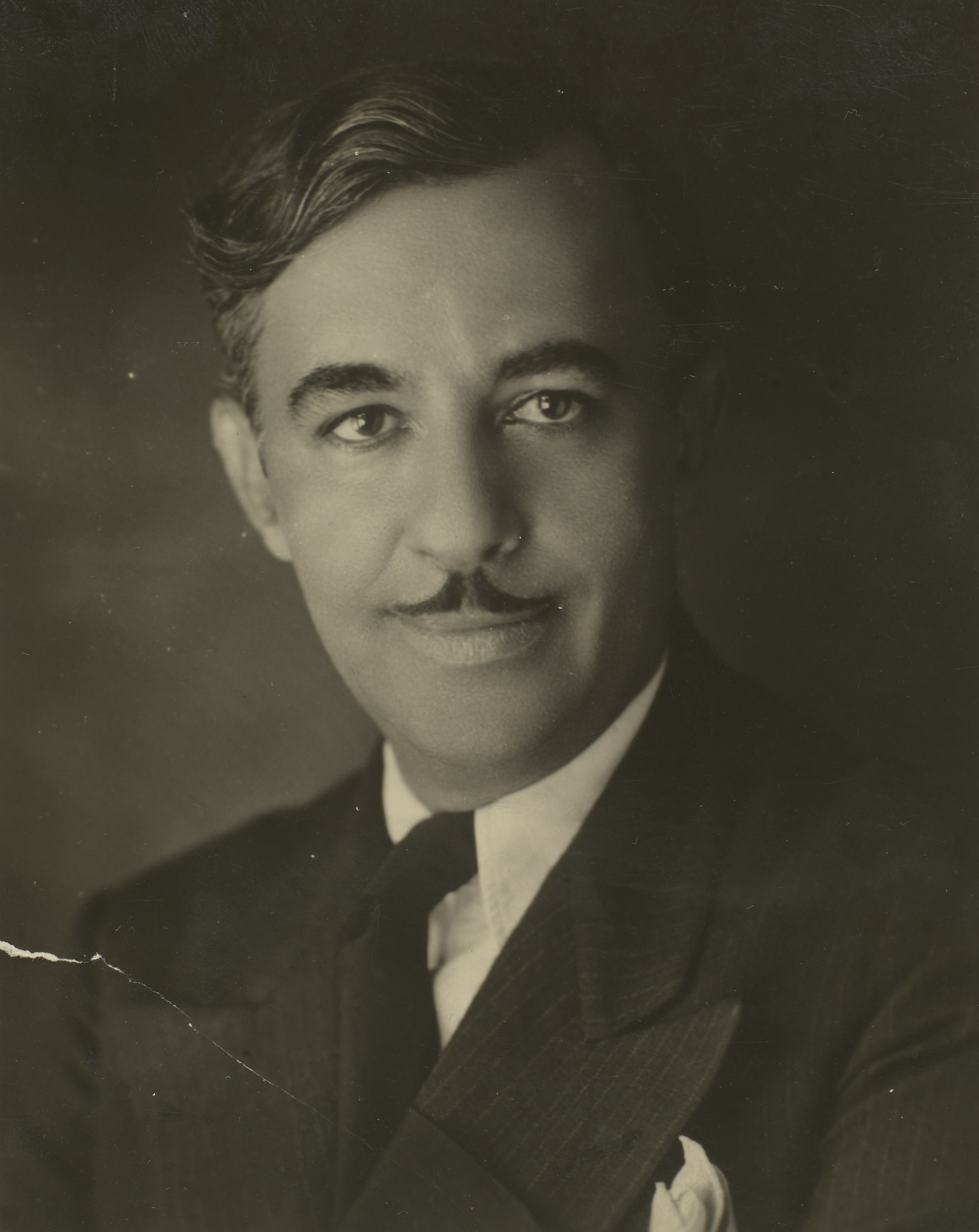
- Luiz de Barros in 1935.
- Born: 12 September 1893; Rio de Janeiro, Brazil
- Died: 1982 (aged 88–89); Rio de Janeiro
- Years active: 1914–1977

Luiz de Barros (September 12, 1893 – 1982) was a prominent Brazilian film director, film producer, film editor, screenwriter, cinematographer, film actor and set designer and manager who played a key role in Brazilian film production from the early silent era around 1914 through to the late 1970s. One of his trademarks was taking responsibility for nearly every department of the production of his films.

He directed over 80 films between 1914 and 1977.

== Filmography ==
- A Viuvinha (1914)
- Perdida (1916)
- Vivo ou Morto (1916)
- Zerotreze 013 (1918)
- Amor e Boemia (1918)
- Alma Sertaneja (1919)
- Ubirajara (1919)
- Coração de Gaúcho (1920)
- Jóia Maldita (1920)
- As Aventuras de Gregório (1920)
- O Rio Grande do Sul (documentary) (1922)
- Augusto Aníbal Quer Casar (1923)
- Cavaleiro Negro (1923)
- A Capital Federal (1923)
- Vocação Irresistível (1924)
- A Vinganca Do Peão (1924)
- Hei de Vencer (1924)
- Depravação (1926)
- Operação de Estômago (documentary) (1928)
- Operação Cesariana (documentary) (1928)
- Uma Encrenca no Olimpo (1929)
- Acabaram-se os Otários (1929)
- Amor de Apache (1930)
- O Babão (1930)
- Messalina (1930)
- Canções Brasileiras (1930)
- Alvorada da Glória (1931)
- Carioca Maravilhosa (1936)
- O Jovem Tataravô (1936)
- Samba da Vida (1937)
- Tererê Não Resolve (1938)
- Maridinho de Luxo (1938)
- E o Circo Chegou (1940)
- Cisne branco (1940)
- Entra na Farra (1941)
- A Sedução do Garimpo (1941)
- Samba in Berlin (1943)
- Berlin to the Samba Beat (1944)
- Corações Sem Piloto (1944)
- Pif-Paf (1945)
- O Cortiço (1945)
- O Cavalo 13 (1946)
- Caídos do Céu (1946)
- O Malandro e a grã-fina (1947)
- Esta é Fina (1948)
- Fogo na Canjica (1948)
- Pra Lá de Boa (1949)
- Eu Quero é Movimento (1949)
- Inocência (1949)
- Anjo do Lodo (1951)
- Agüenta Firme, Isidoro (1951)
- O Rei do Samba (1952)
- Está com Tudo (1952)
- Era uma Vez um Vagabundo (1952)
- É Pra Casar? (1953)
- Com a Mão na Massa (1953)
- Malandros em Quarta Dimensão (1954)
- Trabalhou Bem, Genival (1955)
- Samba na Vila (1956)
- Quem Sabe, Sabe! (1956)
- O Negócio Foi Assim (1956)
- Um Pirata do Outro Mundo (1957)
- Tudo é Música (1957)
- Aí Vêm os Cadetes (1959)
- Por Um Céu de Liberdade (1961)
- Vagabundos no Society (1962)
- Ele, Ela, Quem? (1980)

== External links and sources ==
- Luiz de Barros at IMDb
