= Wirberg =

Coordinates: 50.60464°N 8.906621°E

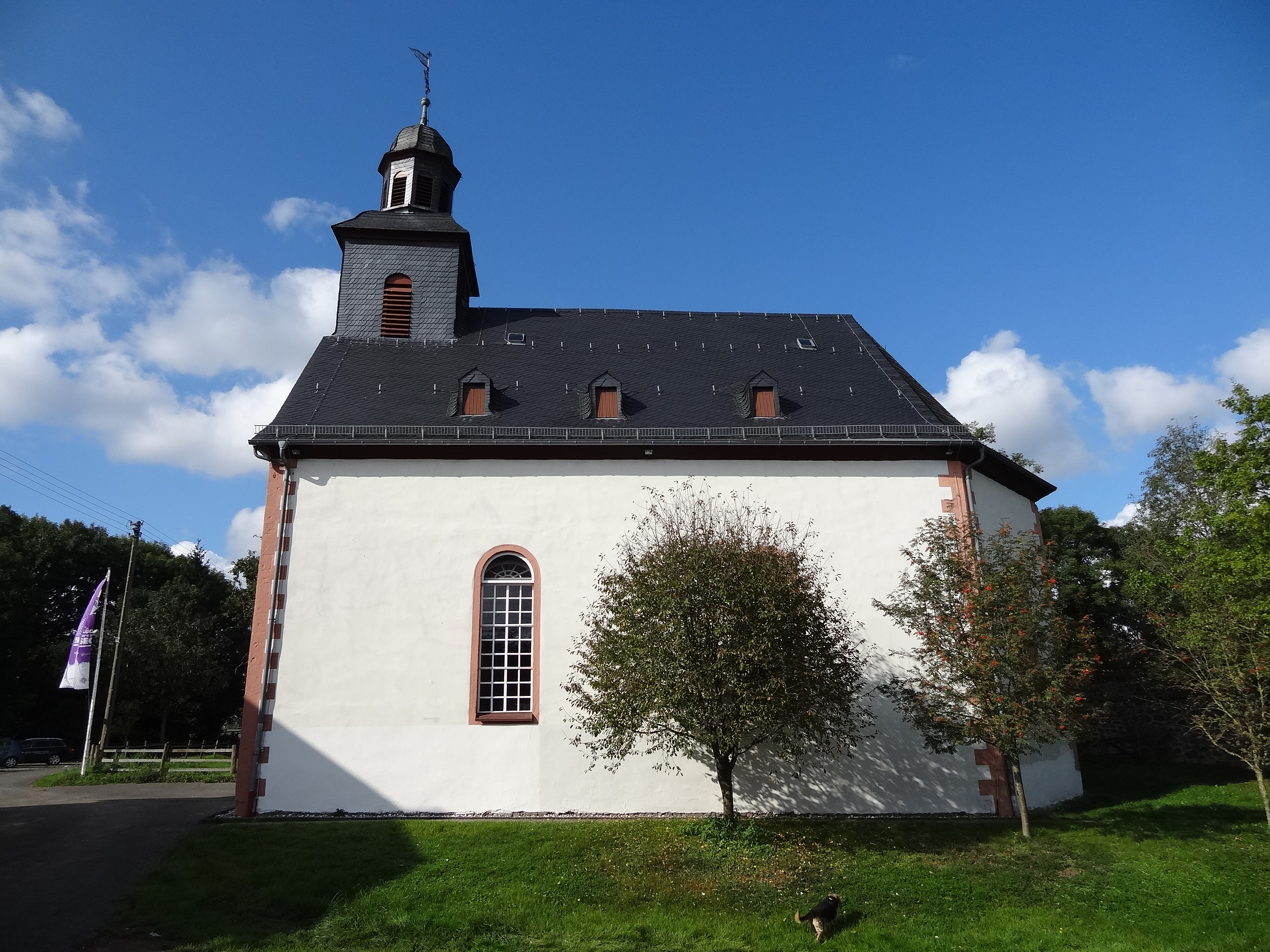
Kirche Wirberg

Wirberg is a former monastery complex in the district of Giessen. It is located on the eastern edge of the municipality of Reiskirchen between Saasen and Göbelnrod, and about eight miles north-west of Grünberg. The church was once the Protestant Church serving the Grünberg districts of Göbelnrod, Beltershain, Harbach, Weitershain and Reinhardshain. Today, it is used as a church on special occasions.

== History ==
The name "Wirberg" comes from Wereberch, meaning "fortified hill". There was a fortified castle there at the beginning of the 12th century.

The Premonstratensian monastery was founded as a double monastery between 1134 and 1148 by the Premonstratensian Otto von Cappenberg, who was provost of the Cappenberg monastery until his death in 1171. Cappenberg was founded as a double monastery. His brother, Godfrey of Cappenberg, had already founded Ilbenstadt Monastery.

The female founder was Aurelia, the daughter of Manegold von Wirberg, who brought her inheritance with her as a dowry. The patron saints of the monastery were the Virgin Mary and St. Martin. Toward the end of the 13th century, the double monastery became just a nunnery, and in 1286 the sisters switched to the Order of Augustinian Canonesses.

During the Reformation in Hesse, the monastery was dissolved in 1527 and its assets were transferred to the University of Marburg. During the Thirty Years' War, in 1635, the rectory was destroyed and the church was damaged. After the end of the war, in 1658, it was rebuilt, and in 1690 a new rectory was built. In 1716, the tower of the church collapsed and destroyed the nave. The present church was built on the site of the ruins in 1753-1754 and consecrated in 1755. It is still used for weddings and baptisms, and the restored buildings are now used as a recreation centre for youth groups of the Protestant Church in Hesse and Nassau In the summer, the meadows in front of the monastery are used as a camp site for youth groups, boy scouts and girl guides.

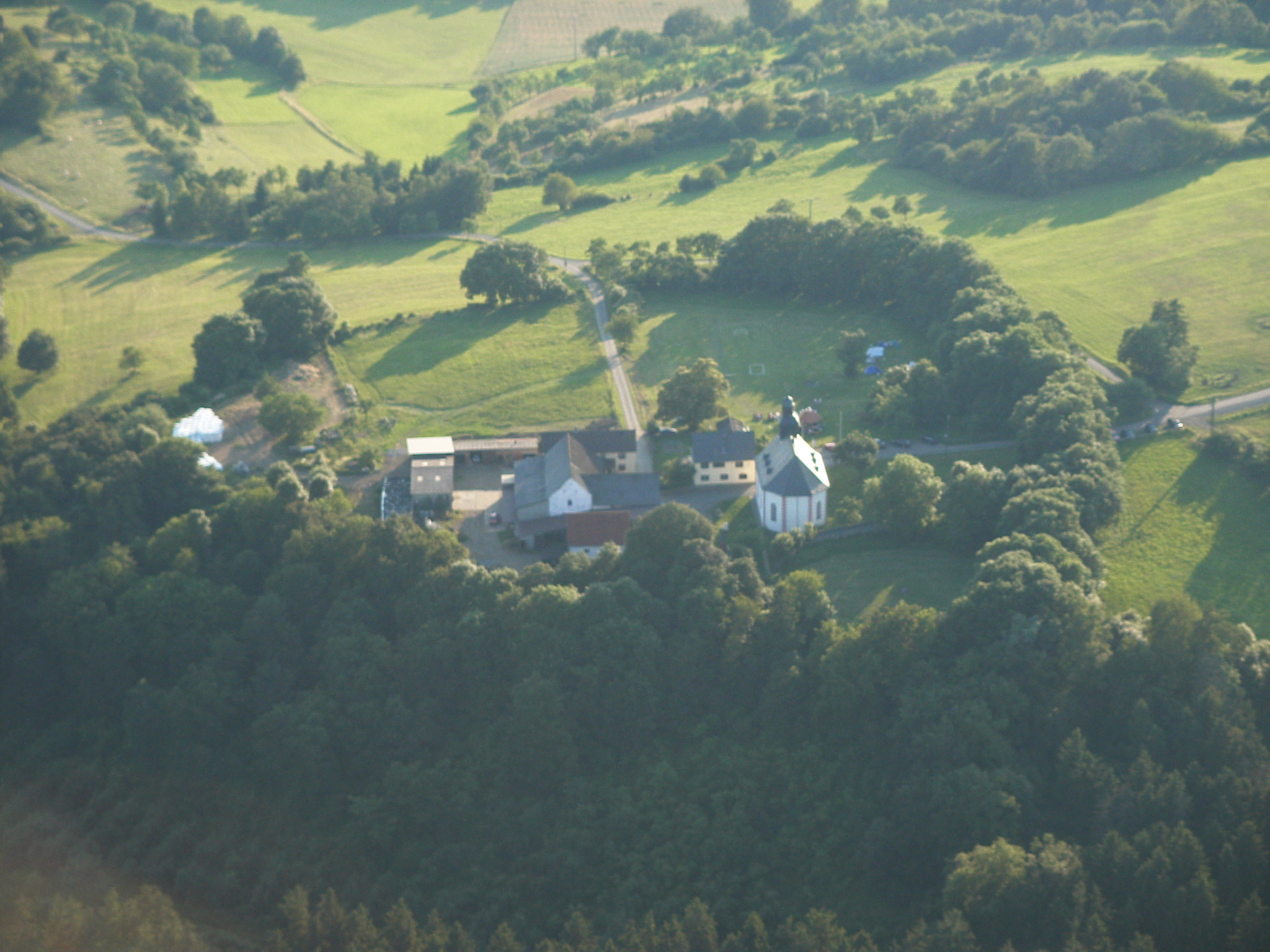
Aerial photograph of Wirberg, June 2002

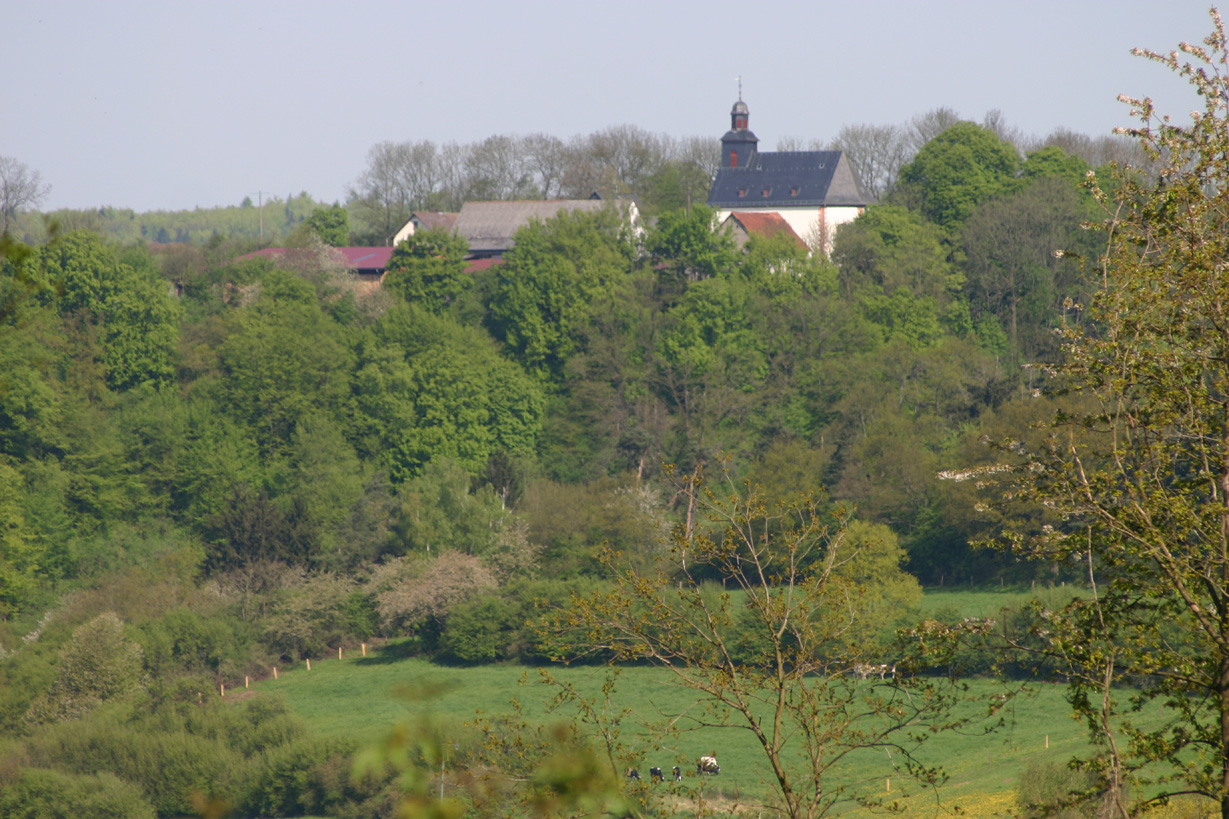
Wirberg, May 2008

== Protestant pastors at Wirberg ==
=== 16th century ===
- Johannes Wagner, 1527 to c. 1531
- Emmericus, 1535
- Sebastian Heckersdorf c. 1550 to 1569
- Konrad Corvinus, 1569 to 1574
- Johannes Armbroster, 1574 to 1589
- Heinrich Ruppersberg, 1589 to 1619

=== 17th century ===
- Johannes Wetzelius, 1619 to 1635
- Johannes Staudinger, 1635
- Johannes Braun, 1635 to c. 1677
- Kaspar Reitz, 1651 to 1712 first assistant, then pastor

=== 18th century ===
- Johann Philipp Eckhard, 1712 to 1715
- Johannes Heß, 1715 to 1727
- Martin Baldasar Fischer, 1727 to 1742
- Johannes Jeremias Nebel, 1742 to 1771
- Jakob Heinrich Wilhelm Stipp, 1772 to 1784
- Johann Daniel Bernbeck, 1784 to 1816

=== 19th century ===
- Ernst Friedrich Steinberger, 1816 to 1832
- Johann Wilhelm Röhrig, 1835 to 1850
- Friedrich August Herzberger, 1850 to 1855
- Hermann Hüffel, 1856 to 1875
- Georg Sehrt, 1877 to 1887
- Peter Ahlheim, 1891 to 1896
- Gustav Biedenkopf, 1897 to 1905

=== 20th century ===
- Ernst Siebeck, 1906 to 1910
- Heinrich Blank, 1911 to 1921
- Otto Wilhelm Döll, 1921 to 1933
- Friedrich Wilhelm Christian Volz, 1933 to 1946
- Heinrich Wilhelm Schäfer, 1946 to 1952
- Ruprecht Erich Helmut Albrecht Spangenberg, 1952 to 1954
- Theo Gustav Weygandt, 1954 to 1960
- Walter Müller, 1960 to 1971
- Karl-Heinz Westenberger, 1971 to 1983
- Rolf Schmidt, seit 1986

== Bibliography ==
- Glaser, Carl (1856). Zur Geschichte des Klosters Wirberg [The History of Wirberg Monastery] (in German). Giessen: Keller. pp. 3–16.
- Backmund (1983). Monasticon Praemonstratense (in German). Vol. 1. Berlin. pp. 122–123.
- Dehio, Georg; Gall, Ernst. Handbuch der deutschen Kunstdenkmäler: Hessen, edited by M. Backes. Vol. 3. Deutscher Kunstverlag.
- "Analecta Praemonstatensia". Analecta Praemonstratensia. Averbode: 321. 2002. ISSN 0517-6735..
