= Saasen (Reiskirchen) =

- Ortsteil of Reiskirchen
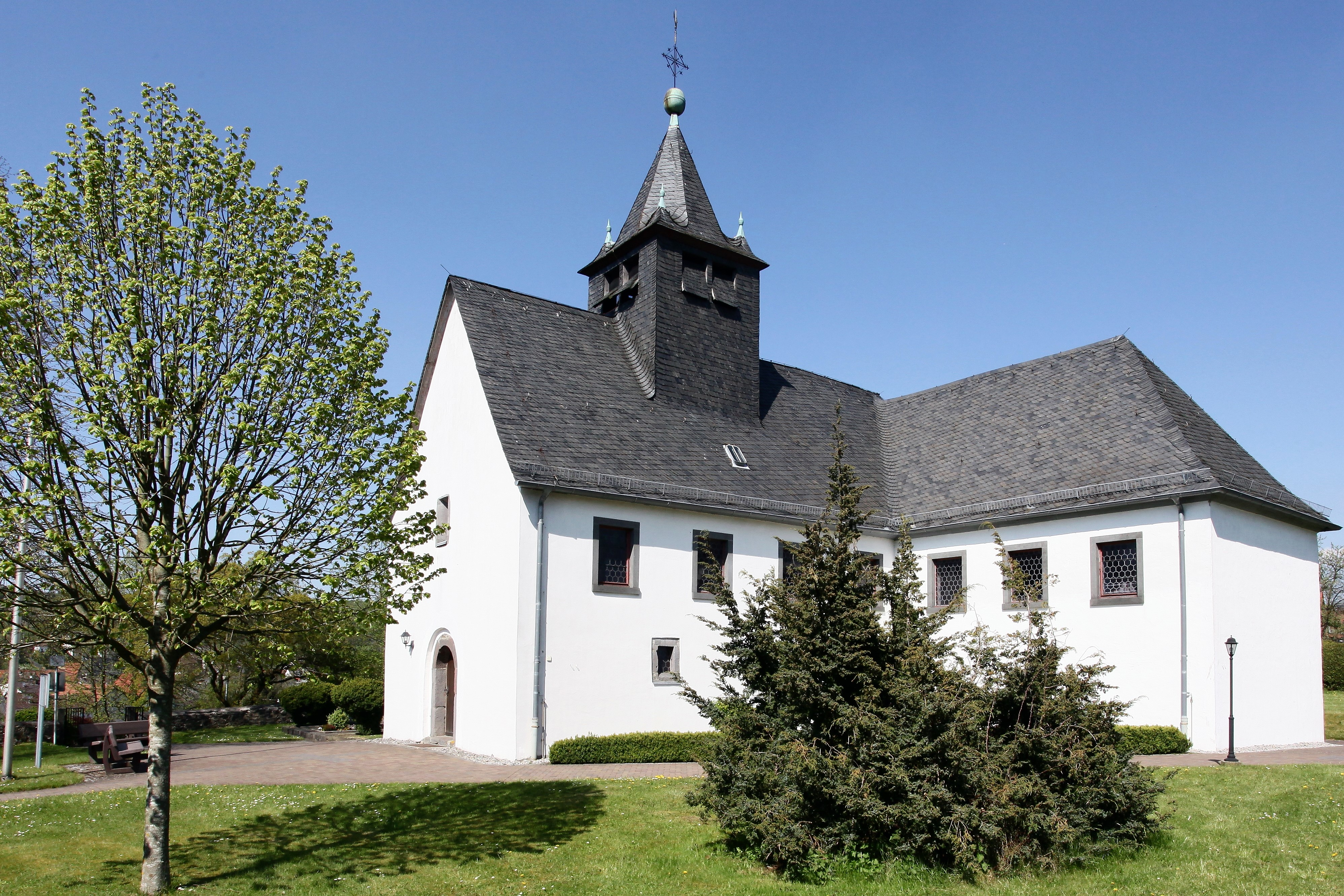
- Protestant church
- Interactive map of Saasen
- Location within Germany Location within Hesse
- Coordinates: 50°35′41″N 08°52′52″E
- Country: Germany
- State: Hesse
- Admin. region: Giessen
- District: Giessen
- Municipality: Reiskirchen

Area
  - Total: 7.37 km^{2} (2.85 sq mi)
- Elevation: 233–252 m (764–827 ft)

Population (2011-12-31)
  - Total: 1,135
  - Density: 154/km^{2} (399/sq mi)
- Time zone: UTC+01:00 (CET)
  - Summer (DST): UTC+02:00 (CEST)
- Postal codes: 35447
- Dialling codes: 06401
- Vehicle registration: GI

Saasen (/ˈsɑːzən/; German: [ˈsaːzən]) is a village in the municipality of Reiskirchen in Central Hesse, Germany. It includes the hamlets of Bollnbach, Veitsberg and Wirberg, a former castle.

The village is located on the River Wieseck, east of the main town of Reiskirchen, in the Busecker Tal region (the valley of the River Buseck), and a few hundred metres from the Bundesstraße 49 arterial road. Saasen station is on the Vogelsberg Railway. Saasen has a population of about 1100.

The settlement was first mentioned in a document in the year 1111.

The name of the village has changed over the centuries:

- in Sahsun (1111/1137)
- fon den Sassen (1249)
- de Sahsen (1251)
- de Sasen (1279)
- von den Sayssin (1379)

== Division of the town ==
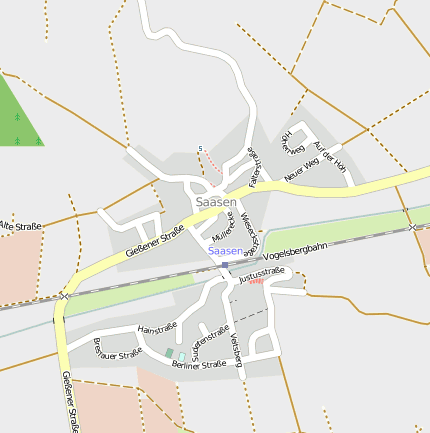
The map of Saasen

The village consists of 9 hamlets or settlements:

- Saasen centre (Mittelstadt)
- New housing estate
- Old village (Altstadt)
- Western village
- Eastern village
- Wirberg
- Stromberg
- Veitsberg
- Bollnbach

== The village square ==
The village square in Saasen is surrounded by half-timbered buildings and the river Wieseck runs through it.

== Bollnbach ==
Bollnbach is the biggest area of Saasen. Today, 48 people live in Bollnbach. In the middle of town is a Maibaum with all family names where the people live. Bollnbach has only two roads, the Wirbergerstraße and Saasenerstraße. In the middle of Bollnbach is also standing the "Schäferhaus" the main hall in Bollnbach.

== Wirberg ==
Wirberg is a former monastery located between Saasen and Göbelnrod.

== Church of Veitsberg ==
The Veitsberg Church is a Romanesque components and from the time received in 1250. Next to the church, in the former schoolhouse in the years 1734-1785, lived the "man of the calendar Veitsberg", the mathematically and scientifically versed Jacob Conrad Justus. He was here the village schoolmaster and taught the children of Saasen and Lindenstruth.

== Wieseck ==
The river Wieseck originates in Saasen.

== Geography ==
The village square of Saasen was established on the eastern bank of the Wieseck on a ridge of land backed by a steep hill. It is at this point and the spring of Wieseck. The site is located east of the main town in the valley on the Busecker tal and at the Wieseck in central Hesse.

== Demographics ==
The village has been expanding in size quite considerably in recent years, with a population estimate of 1,200 in 2006, up over 60 from the census in 2001.

== Sport ==
The best known football club in Saasen is the sports club SV 1936 Saasen. SV Saasen has also other sections for bowling, gymnastics, and table tennis. Another known club is the youth academy. JSG Saasen/Harbach/Ettingshausen

=== Places of interest ===
- Church of Wirberg
- Wirberger view on Saasen
- Church of Veitsberg Saasen
- Little Lake
- Home museum Saasen (closed)
- Central of Saasen
- Half-timbered buildings
- Stadion am Wingert
- Old Train Station

== Railway station ==
Saasen railway station is on the Vogelsberg Railway line from Giessen to Fulda).
