= 1934 in Brazil =

Events in the year 1934 in Brazil.

== Incumbents ==
=== Federal government ===
- President: Getúlio Vargas (Head of the Provisional Government before 20 July)
- Vice President: None

=== Governors ===
- Alagoas:
  - till 2 March: Alfonso de Carvalho
  - 2 March – 1 May: Themistocles Vieira de Azevedo
  - from 1 May: Osman Laurel
- Amazonas: Nélson de Melo
- Bahia: Juracy Magalhães
- Ceará: Roberto Carneiro de Mendonça (till 5 September); Filipe Moreira Lima (from 5 September)
- Espírito Santo: João Punaro Bley
- Goiás:
  - till 21 June: Pedro Ludovico Teixeira
  - 21 June – 19 July: Inácio Bento de Loyola
  - 19 July – 3 August: Vasco dos Reis Gonçalves
  - 3 August – 9 October: Pedro Ludovico Teixeira
  - 9 October – 18 October: Heitor Morais Fleury
  - from 18 October: Pedro Ludovico Teixeira
- Maranhão: Benedito Valadares Ribeiro
- Mato Grosso: César de Mesquita Serva then Leônidas Antero de Matos
- Minas Gerais: Benedito Valadares Ribeiro
- Pará: Joaquim de Magalhães Barata
- Paraíba: Gratuliano da Costa Brito (until 26 December); José Marques da Silva Mariz (from 26 December)
- Paraná: Manuel Ribas
- Pernambuco: Carlos de Lima Cavalcanti
- Piauí: Landry Sales
- Rio Grande do Norte: Mario Leopoldo Pereira da Camera
- Rio Grande do Sul: José Antônio Flores da Cunha
- Santa Catarina: Aristiliano Ramos
- São Paulo: Armando de Sales Oliveira
- Sergipe: Augusto Maynard Gomes

=== Vice governors ===
- Rio Grande do Norte: no vice governor
- São Paulo: no vice governor

== Events ==
- date unknown
  - The University of São Paulo is established.
  - The Brazilian Institute of Geography and Statistics is founded under the title of the National Institute of Statistics.

=== January ===
- 23 January - President Getúlio Vargas signs decree n° 23,793, which approves the first Brazilian Forest Code.

=== July ===
- 16 July - The Vargas government introduces what will be the shortest-lived Constitution of Brazil, lasting only 3 years (until 1937). It is the first time a Brazilian constitution has been written from scratch by directly elected deputies in multi-party elections, and incorporates a number of improvements to Brazilian political, social and economical life.
- 17 July - In the presidential election, carried out by the Constituent Assembly, acting president Getúlio Vargas receives 175 of the 248 votes.

== Arts and culture ==
=== Books ===
- Jorge Amado - Suor
- Monteiro Lobato - Emília no País da Gramática and Aritmética da Emília
- Carolina Nabuco - A Sucessora

=== Films ===
- O Caçador de Diamantes

== Births ==
=== January ===
- 4 January: Elias Gleizer, comedian and actor (died 2015)
- 18 January: Zacarias, comedy actor (died 1990)

=== February ===
- 9 February: Ruth Volgl Cardoso, chess grandmaster (died 2000)

=== June ===
- 30 June: Luiz Carlos Bresser-Pereira, economist and social scientist

=== August ===
- 8 August: Cláudio Hummes, Roman Catholic cardinal (died 2022)
- 25 August: Zilda Arns, pediatrician and aid worker (died 2010)
- 27 August: Sylvia Telles, singer (died 1966)

=== October ===
- 15 October: Flávio Migliaccio, writer, director and screenwriter (died 2020)

== Deaths ==
=== February ===
- 5 February: Ernesto Nazareth, composer (born 1863)

=== April ===
- 6 April: Ismael Nery, artist (born 1900; tuberculosis)

=== May ===
- 29 May: Augusto Pestana, engineer and politician (born 1868)
- 30 May: Júlia Lopes de Almeida, writer (born 1862)

=== June ===
- 9 June: Medeiros e Albuquerque, poet, politician and journalist (born 1867)

=== July ===
- 6 July: Prince Peter of Saxe-Coburg and Gotha, son of Princess Leopoldina of Brazil (born 1866)
- 20 July: Padre Cicero, Catholic priest and spiritual leader (born 1844)

=== November ===
- 8 November: Carlos Chagas, sanitary physician and bacteriologist (born 1879)
- 28 November: Coelho Neto, writer and politician (born 1864)

== See also ==
- 1934 in Brazilian football

== See also ==
- 1934 in Brazilian football
- List of Brazilian films of 1934
