= 1934 Campeonato Carioca =

In the 1934 season of the Campeonato Carioca, two championships were disputed, each by a different league.

== AMEA Championship ==
Campeonato Carioca
- Season: 1934
- Champions: Botafogo
- Top goalscorer: Bianco (Andarahy) – 18 goals
- Biggest home win: Botafogo 6-0 Brasil (May 13, 1934); Botafogo 6-0 Portuguesa (June 10, 1934)
- Biggest away win: Confiança 0-3 Andarahy (April 8, 1934)
- Highest scoring: Cocotá 5-5 River (May 6, 1934); Mavílis 7-3 Portuguesa (August 12, 1934)

The edition of the Campeonato Carioca organized by AMEA started on April 8, 1934. The championship began with all the ten teams that had finished the championship of the previous year, but in early June, a series of events that resulted on half the teams leaving the championship began. the severely reduced championship only ended on January 13, 1935. Botafogo won the championship for the 7th time. no teams were relegated.

=== Participating teams ===
Club	Home location	Previous season
Andarahy	Andaraí, Rio de Janeiro	3rd
Botafogo	Botafogo, Rio de Janeiro	1st
Brasil	Urca, Rio de Janeiro	9th
Cocotá	Ilha do Governador, Rio de Janeiro	6th
Confiança	Andaraí, Rio de Janeiro	5th
Engenho de Dentro	Engenho de Dentro, Rio de Janeiro	4th
Mavílis	Caju, Rio de Janeiro	7th
Olaria	Olaria, Rio de Janeiro	2nd
Portuguesa	Ilha do Governador, Rio de Janeiro	8th
River	Piedade, Rio de Janeiro	10th

=== System ===
The tournament would be disputed in a double round-robin format, with the team with the most points winning the title.

=== Championship ===
Due to the unbalanced number of matches that the remaining teams had, for title awarding purposes, it was decided that the team with less points lost would win the title and that the matches against the five teams that had abandoned the championship wouldn't be annulled.

Pos	Team	Pld	W	D	L	GF	GA	GD	Pts	Qualification or relegation
1	Botafogo	11	7	2	2	31	17	+14	6	Champions
2	Andarahy	12	7	3	2	32	18	+14	7	
3	Olaria	11	6	1	4	23	18	+5	9	
4	Mavílis	11	6	1	4	29	26	+3	9	
5	Portuguesa	12	1	1	10	15	35	−20	21	
6	Cocotá	6	2	2	2	13	13	0	6 (Note: The chairman of SC Brasil had a falling out with CBD after the latter attempted to reach a compromise with FBF and abandoned the league. Cocotá and Confiança also left the league in solidarity to Brasil.)	Withdrew
7	Engenho de Dentro	6	2	1	3	13	12	+1	7 (Note: After losing the use of its usual playing field in late May, Engenho de Dentro abandoned AMEA and joined LCF's Subliga.)	Withdrew
8	Brasil	5	2	0	3	4	14	−10	6	Withdrew
9	River	5	0	3	2	14	16	−2	7 (Note: River saw the registration of their player Alfredo da Silva rejected after irregularities were found with it. After having its appeal rejected, River didn't show up for their June 10 match against Mavílis and abandoned the championship soon after.)	Withdrew
10	Confiança	3	1	0	2	5	10	−5	4	Withdrew

Updated to match(es) played on January 13, 1935. Source: RSSSF.com
Rules for classification: 1) points; 2) goal difference; 3) wins; 4) number of goals scored.

== LCF Championship ==
Campeonato Carioca
- Season: 1934
- Champions: Vasco da Gama
- Matches: 42
- Goals: 169 (4.02 per match)
- Top goalscorer: Nélson (Flamengo) – 10 goals
- Biggest home win: Flamengo 8-2 Bomsuccesso (April 12, 1934)
- Biggest away win: Bomsuccesso 2-7 Flamengo (July 8, 1934); Bangu 0-5 América (July 22, 1934)
- Highest scoring: Flamengo 8-2 Bomsuccesso (April 12, 1934)

The edition of the Campeonato Carioca organized by LCF (Liga Carioca de Football, or Carioca Football League) kicked off on April 1, 1934, and ended on August 12, 1934. Six teams participated. Vasco da Gama won the championship for the 4th time. No teams were relegated.

=== Participating teams ===
Club	Home location	Previous season
América	Tijuca, Rio de Janeiro	5th
Bangu	Bangu, Rio de Janeiro	1st
Bomsuccesso	Bonsucesso, Rio de Janeiro	4th
Fluminense	Laranjeiras, Rio de Janeiro	2nd
Flamengo	Flamengo, Rio de Janeiro	6th
São Cristóvão	São Cristóvão, Rio de Janeiro	1st (Subliga)
Vasco da Gama	São Cristóvão, Rio de Janeiro	3rd

=== System ===
The tournament would be disputed in a double round-robin format, with the team with the most points winning the title.

=== Championship ===
Pos	Team	Pld	W	D	L	GF	GA	GD	Pts	Qualification or relegation
1	Vasco da Gama	12	8	2	2	28	16	+12	18	Champions
2	São Cristóvão	12	5	4	3	15	15	0	14	
3	América	12	4	5	3	24	19	+5	13	
4	Bangu	12	6	1	5	24	30	−6	13	
5	Fluminense	12	4	3	5	24	22	+2	11	
6	Flamengo	12	4	2	6	35	29	+6	10	
7	Bomsuccesso	12	2	1	9	19	38	−19	5	

Updated to match(es) played on August 12, 1934. Source: RSSSF.com
Rules for classification: 1) points; 2) goal difference; 3) wins; 4) number of goals scored.
