= 1934 São Paulo FC season =

São Paulo
1934 season
- Chairman: Edgard de Souza Aranha
- Manager: Rubens Sales
- Campeonato Paulista: Runners-up

The 1934 football season was São Paulo's 5th season since the club's founding in 1930.

== Overall ==
| Games played | 33 (14 Campeonato Paulista, 19 Friendly match) |
| Games won | 23 (10 Campeonato Paulista, 13 Friendly match) |
| Games drawn | 4 (3 Campeonato Paulista, 1 Friendly match) |
| Games lost | 6 (1 Campeonato Paulista, 5 Friendly match) |
| Goals scored | 81 |
| Goals conceded | 42 |
| Goal difference | +39 |
| Best result | 9–1 (H) v Sírio - Campeonato Paulista - 1934.4.1 |
| Worst result | 0–3 (A) v Vasco da Gama - Friendly match - 1934.3.11 |
| Top scorer | |

Source: São Paulo FC

== Friendlies ==
| January 21 National | São Paulo | 5–2 | Corinthians | São Paulo |
| | | | | Stadium: Chácara da Floresta |

| February 25 National | São Paulo | 3–0 | Portuguesa | São Paulo |
| | | | | Stadium: Chácara da Floresta |

| March 1 National | Siderúrgica | 3–1 | São Paulo | Sabará |
| | | | | Stadium: Praia do Ó |

| March 4 National | Atlético Mineiro | 1–3 | São Paulo | Belo Horizonte |
| | | | | Stadium: Presidente Antônio Carlos |

| March 6 National | Tupy | 1–3 | São Paulo | Juiz de Fora |
| | | | | Stadium: Estádio Municipal |

| March 11 National | Vasco da Gama | 3–0 | São Paulo | Rio de Janeiro |
| | | | | Stadium: São Januário |

| March 18 National | São Paulo | 2–1 | Vasco da Gama | São Paulo |

| March 25 National | Santos | 3–4 | São Paulo | Santos |
| | | | | Stadium: Vila Belmiro |

| April 7 National | São Paulo | 5–0 | América-RJ | São Paulo |

| April 21 National | América-RJ | 4–3 | São Paulo | Rio de Janeiro |

| June 10 National | São Paulo | 4–2 | América-RJ | São Paulo |

| August 8 National | Vasco da Gama | 2–1 | São Paulo | Rio de Janeiro |

| August 19 National | Luzitana | 1–8 | São Paulo | Bauru |
| | | | | Stadium: Vila América |

| October 13 National | Santos | 1–2 | São Paulo | Santos |
| | | | | Stadium: Vila Belmiro |

| November 13 National | Flamengo | 1–1 | São Paulo | Rio de Janeiro |
| | | | | Stadium: Laranjeiras |

| December 6 National | São Paulo | 2–0 | Flamengo | São Paulo |

| December 16 National | São Paulo | 4–5 | Flamengo / Fluminense | São Paulo |
| | | | | Stadium: Chácara da Floresta |

=== Torneio dos Cinco Clubes ===
| September 23 | São Paulo | 1–2 | Corinthians | São Paulo |
| | | | | Stadium: Chácara da Floresta |

| October 7 | Portuguesa | 2–4 | São Paulo | São Paulo |
| | | | | Stadium: Cambuci |

| October 13 | Santos | 1–2 | São Paulo | Santos |
| | | | | Stadium: Vila Belmiro |

| October 28 | Palestra Itália | 0–1 | São Paulo | São Paulo |
| | | | | Stadium: Parque Antarctica |

| November 25 | São Paulo | 4–2 | Santos | São Paulo |
| | | | | Stadium: Chácara da Floresta |

| December 2 | Corinthians | 0–1 | São Paulo | São Paulo |
| | | | | Stadium: Parque São Jorge |

== Official competitions ==
=== Campeonato Paulista ===
| April 1 | São Paulo | 9–1 | Sírio | São Paulo |
| | | | | Stadium: Chácara da Floresta |

| April 15 | São Paulo | 1–1 | Corinthians | São Paulo |
| | | | | Stadium: Chácara da Floresta |

| April 29 | Portuguesa | 0–1 | São Paulo | São Paulo |
| | | | | Stadium: Rua Cesário Ramalho |

| May 6 | São Paulo | 5–4 | Ypiranga | São Paulo |
| | | | | Stadium: Chácara da Floresta |

| May 27 | São Paulo | 3–0 | Santos | São Paulo |
| | | | | Stadium: Chácara da Floresta |

| June 3 | Palestra Itália | 2–0 | São Paulo | São Paulo |
| | | | | Stadium: Parque Antarctica |

| June 17 | São Paulo | 3–0 | C.A. Paulista | São Paulo |
| | | | | Stadium: Chácara da Floresta |

| June 24 | Sírio | 2–3 | São Paulo | São Paulo |
| | | | | Stadium: Ponte Grande |

| July 8 | São Paulo | 0–0 | Corinthians | São Paulo |
| | | | | Stadium: Chácara da Floresta |

| July 22 | C.A. Paulista | 1–2 | São Paulo | São Paulo |
| | | | | Stadium: Antônio Alonso |

| July 29 | São Paulo | 1–0 | Portuguesa | São Paulo |
| | | | | Stadium: Chácara da Floresta |

| August 5 | São Paulo | 4–0 | Ypiranga | São Paulo |
| | | | | Stadium: Chácara da Floresta |

| August 26 | Santos | 1–1 | São Paulo | Santos |
| | | | | Stadium: Vila Belmiro |

| September 2 | São Paulo | 1–0 | Palestra Itália | São Paulo |
| | | | | Stadium: Chácara da Floresta |

| Final Position | Points | Matches | Wins | Draws | Losses | Goals For | Goals Away | Win% |
|---|---|---|---|---|---|---|---|---|
| 2nd | 23 | 14 | 10 | 3 | 1 | 34 | 12 | 82% |
