= List of Brazilian films of 1934 =

A list of films produced in Brazil in 1934:

Title	Director	Cast	Genre	Notes
O Caçador de Diamantes	Vittorio Capellaro	Elmo Califontes, Reginaldo Calmon, Benevenuto Capellaro	Adventure	
Terra Portuguesa, o Minho	Joaquim Gonçalves de Araújo, Silvino Santos			

== See also ==
- 1934 in Brazil
