= Theodor Koch-Grünberg =

German ethnologist and explorer

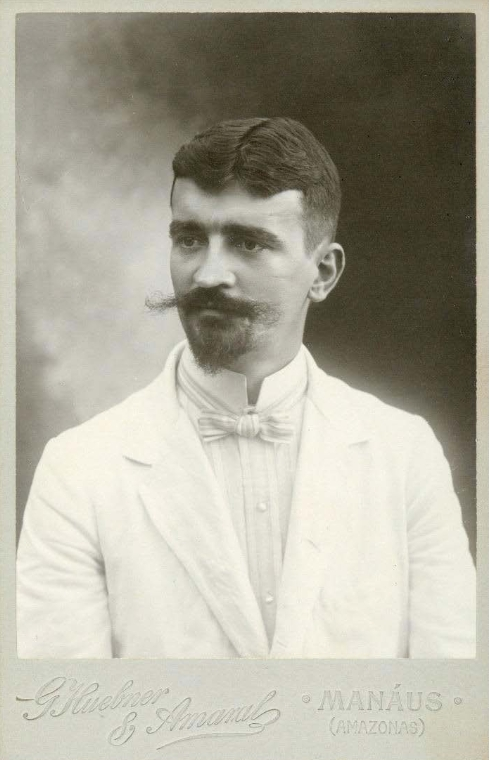
c. 1903

Theodor Koch-Grünberg (April 9, 1872, in Grünberg, Hesse and by Rhine, German Empire – October 8, 1924, in Caracaraí, Brazil) was a German ethnologist and explorer who travelled and studied the Indigenous peoples in South America, in particular the Pemon of Venezuela and other indigenous peoples in the Amazon region extending South-Western Brazil and a large part of the Vaupés region in Colombia. The 2015 film El abrazo de la serpiente (Embrace of the Serpent) fictionalizes his illness and final days based on his journals.

== Life and work ==
=== Early life ===
Christian Theodor Koch was born in Grünberg. Following his studying humanities at the University of Tübingen. He then taught at schools in the state of Hessen. In 1896, he travelled to Brazil for the first time as a volunteer member of an expedition led by Hermann Meyer in search of the source of the Xingu River, a tributary of the Amazon River. In 1901 he resigned from school teaching and became a research assistant at the Royal Museum of Ethnology in Berlin under Karl von den Steinen (1855-1929). He then obtained a doctorate in philosophy at Würzburg with a thesis on the Guaicuruan languages.

=== First expedition ===
From 1903–1905, Koch explored the Yapura River and the Rio Negro up to the border of Venezuela. In 1906, he published photogravures of a number of natives he encountered on the expedition in his monumental "Indianertypen aus dem Amazonasgebiet nach eigenen Aufnahmen während seiner Reise in Brasilien" (1906). After his travels he added the name of his birthplace to his name.

A written account of Koch-Grünberg's trip, which included his study of the Baniwa, was published in two volumes in 1910-11 under the title of Zwei Jahre Unter Den Indianern. Reisen in Nord West Brasilien, 1903-1905 (Two Years Among the Indians. Travels in North-West Brazil). He illustrated his account with photographs and his descriptions of Brazilian tribes are still used by anthropologists and ethnologists to this day.

=== Second expedition and later career ===
Koch-Grünberg's second major expedition started in 1911. It took him from Manaus, up the Rio Branco to Mount Roraima in Venezuela, where he documented the myths and legends of the Pemon and took many photographs. He incorrectly used the local names Arekuna and Taulipang to describe the indigenous groups he studied, but these are local names for the Pemon.

He then explored the Sierra Parima, the Caura River and the Ventuari River, before reaching the Orinoco River on January 1, 1913.

After spending a short time in San Fernando de Atabapo, at that time the capital of Amazonas Federal Territory, Koch-Grunberg continued his journey along the Casiquiare canal, which links the Orinoco River system with the Amazon, via the Rio Negro.

He then returned to Manaus, before returning to Germany to produce his most important work, Vom Roraima Zum Orinoco (From Roraima to the Orinoco), published in 1917.

=== Later career and death ===
Koch-Grünberg does not, in his writing, often complain about privations regarding food and shelter. Based on his account Two Years Among the Indians... he appeared not to have taken precautions against malaria, but in From Roraima to the Orinoco (page 88, German edition), he describes how he protected himself with quinine, following a German tropical medicine handbook for non-doctors (A. Plehn: Kurzgefasste Vorschriften zur Verhütung und Behandlung der wichtigsten tropischen Krankheiten bei Europäern und Eingeborenen für Nichtärzte).

He was the director of Berlin's Ethnographic Museum, where many of the items he collected on his travels are stored.

Koch-Grünberg died suddenly in Brazil in 1924 after contracting malaria on an expedition with the American explorer, geographer and physician Alexander H. Rice Jr., and the Portuguese-Brazilian cinematographer Silvino Santos to map the upper reaches of the Rio Branco. The film of the expedition was entitled No Rastro Do Eldorado.
