= Wieseck =

Wieseck may refer to:

- Wieseck (river), a river of Hesse, Germany
- Wieseck, a district of the town Giessen in Hesse, Germany
