= Göbelnrod station =

Railway station in Hesse, Germany

Göbelnrod
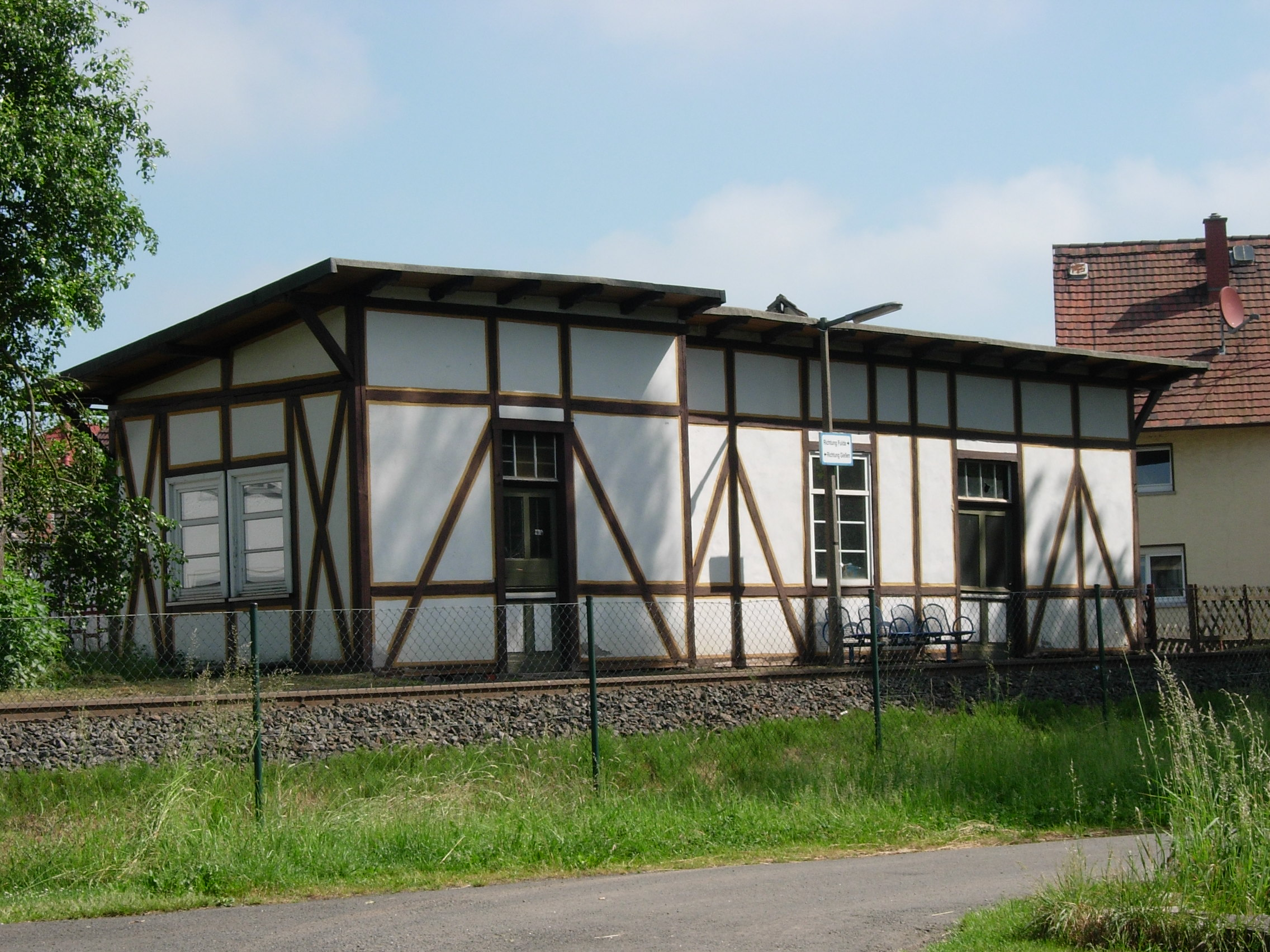

General information
- Location: Am Bahnhof 1, Göbelnrod, Hesse; Germany
- Coordinates: 50°35′51″N 8°55′16″E
- Line: Vogelsberg Railway
- Platforms: 1

Construction
- Accessible: Yes

Other information
- Station code: 2158
- DS100 code: FGOE
- IBNR: 8002301
- Category: 7
- Fare zone: : 1430
- Website: www.bahnhof.de

History
- Opened: 1908

Services
Preceding station	Hessische Landesbahn	Following station
Saasen towards Limburg (Lahn)	RB 45	Grünberg towards Fulda
Location

Göbelnrod (German: Bahnhof Göbelnrod) is a railway station in Göbelnrod, Hesse, Germany. The former through station has been converted to a flag stop.

== History ==
39 years after the commissioning of the first section of the Vogelsberg Railway from Giessen to Grünberg on 29 December 1869, Göbelnrod got a train station. It was opened on 1 July 1908. The first schedule provided nine stops: five towards Fulda, and four in the direction of Gießen.

In the 1970s, due to a structural reform, the personnel were withdrawn. Even the closure associated with the demolition of the building has been up for discussion.

== The station ==
The station is located on the Vogelsberg Railway (Gießen - Fulda). It is served by RB services operated by Deutsche Bahn.

In 1908 the building was erected and the station was opened.

For the State Conservation Office Hesse, the station building is a cultural monument for its rail traffic-historical significance and for historical reasons.

== Rail services ==
The station is served daily by hourly Regionalbahn (RB 45) services on the Limburg (Lahn)–Weilburg–Wetzlar–Gießen–Alsfeld (Oberhess)–Fulda route. In the peak, additional Regionalbahn services run on the Gießen–Grünberg–Mücke route.

Line	Route	Interval
RB 45	Regionalbahn; Limburg (Lahn) – Eschhofen – Weilburg – Wetzlar – Gießen – Saasen – Grünberg (Oberhess) – Mücke (Hess) – Alsfeld (Oberhess) – Fulda	Hourly (+ extra trains in peak hour)
