= No País das Amazonas =

1922 film by Silvino Santos

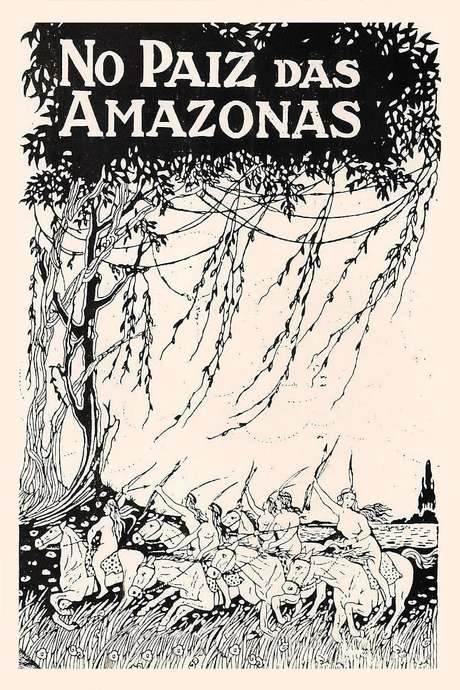
- Directed by: Agesilau De Araujo and Silvino Santos
- Produced by: Joaquim Gonçalves de Araújo
- Cinematography: Silvino Santos
- Edited by: Agesilau De Araujo and Silvino Santos
- Distributed by: J.G. Araújo Produções Cinematográficas
- Release date: 12 January 1922
- Running time: 72 minutes
- Country: Brazil
- Language: Silent (Portuguese intertitles)

No País das Amazonas (1922)

No País das Amazonas is a 1922 Brazilian silent documentary film directed by Agesilau De Araujo and Silvino Santos.

The film was notable in that it was one of the earliest to document the Amazon rainforest on camera and present it to a wider audience and documents the local economies of the Amazonian Indians, examining production lines and workers in factories. It also portrays fishing on the Amazon River as a way of life, and shows how the locals prepare the fish for sale with salt. Later on, the film also examines rubber plantations in the rainforest and how the locals make use of the natural reserves for export.

The film premiered on 12 January 1922 in Rio de Janeiro.

The film was considered lost in 1930, but a copy was rediscovered in 2023 and the film was screened again in November 2023.
