= Amazonas, o Maior Rio do Mundo =

1922 Brazilian film

- Full film
- Directed by: Silvino Santos
- Produced by: Avelino Cardoso, Manoel Gonçalves
- Production company: Amazônia Cine-Film
- Release date: 12 February 1922
- Running time: 66 minutes
- Country: Brazil
- Language: Silent (Portuguese intertitles)

Amazonas, o Maior Rio do Mundo (lit. 'Amazon: The Greatest River in the World') is a 1922 Brazilian silent documentary film produced in 1918 by Silvino Santos. It is a black-and-white film that portrays life in the Amazon rainforest. Completed in 1920, it is considered one of the oldest cinematic records of the Amazon. It was presumed lost in 1931 and only rediscovered in 2023 at the Czech Film Archive.

Silvino Santos produced the work over three years using sophisticated cinematic techniques, which led it to be deemed of "immense artistic value" by Le Monde. It has also been described as the "Holy Grail of Brazilian silent cinema" by The Guardian.

== Plot ==
Amazonas, o Maior Rio do Mundo depicts the Amazon River, the largest in the world, and portrays life in the Amazon rainforest. It documents the richness of the Amazonian flora and fauna, as well as the daily lives and rituals of the Indigenous populations in the regions navigated by the Amazon River.

The film details the transformative processes and economic potential of exploitative practices by local elites, such as latex extraction, hunting for manatees, fishing, and the collection and processing of Brazil nuts, sugarcane, cocoa, and cotton, alongside cattle farming and the timber industry. The film features exotic animals found in the region such as caimans, jaguars, crabs, turtles, birds, and butterflies. Indigenous peoples, such as the Parintintín, are depicted through ancestral records, customs, and rituals: rock inscriptions and drawings, the use of cassava as a staple food, craftsmanship with gourds and hammock making, and the celebration of women within these communities.

== Production ==
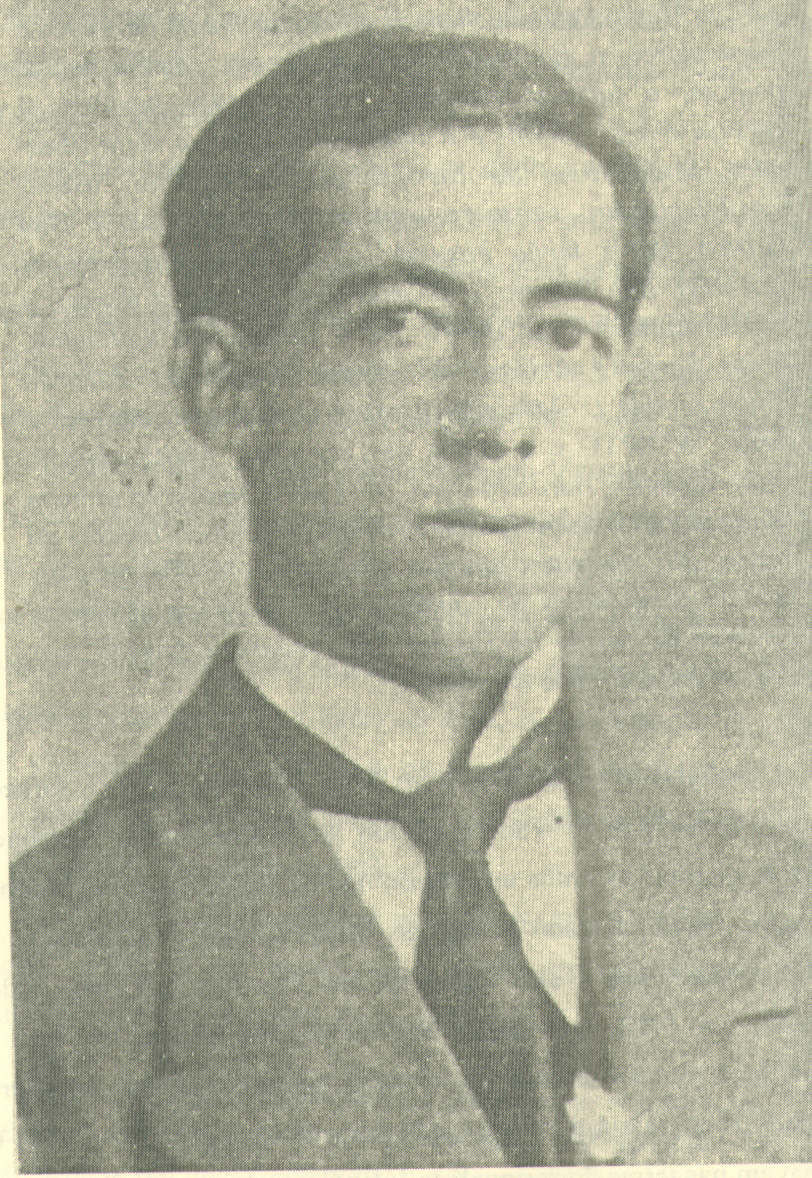
Silvino Santos

In 1917, with the support of the Government of the State of Amazonas and in collaboration with Amazonian merchant Manoel Gonçalves, Silvino Santos founded Amazônia Cine-Film. The following year, with the backing of entrepreneur Avelino Cardoso, Santos produced, in Manaus, a documentary film titled Amazonas, o Maior Rio do Mundo that showcased the wealth and industrial potential of the Amazon rainforest. The film was filmed at the Brazilian states of Amazonas and Pará and the locations of Iquitos and Putumayo in Peru. Completed in June 1920, the film did not focus on Indigenous peoples as much as the contemporary works of military officer and filmmaker Luiz Thomaz Reis, with whom Santos is often compared.

However, the film included footage depicting the customs and ways of the Witoto people, notably commenting—through its intertitles—on the adoption of trousers among the tribe's youth. The film was funded by businessmen from Manaus, with the intention of promoting the Amazonian riches, such as rubber, wood, and Brazil nuts for European investors. Unlike the production of his previous film, which was shot on the Putumayo River in Peru and lost in a shipwreck, Santos personally handled the editing and development of the negatives in a laboratory located in Manaus. The film was the first Brazilian production to use Kodak negatives and to employ an entirely metal camera, manufactured by the American brand Bell & Howell.

== Disappearance ==
After the film had been produced—it was one of the first feature-length Brazilian films, with 6,000 meters of negatives—Silvino Santos received a proposal from Propércio Saraiva, the son-in-law of Avelino Cardoso. Saraiva said that he would take the film negatives to London, where he would create versions with title cards in multiple languages. However, Saraiva sold the material for his own benefit to the French distributor Gaumont, crediting himself as the film's director. Saraiva never returned, and Santos was left in serious financial difficulties. The work was circulated in Europe as The Wonders of the Amazon until presumed lost in 1931. Until its rediscovery in 2023, the film was considered lost, with only fragments surviving that had been repurposed in other productions by its original creator. The film was also very little studied, as a result of the limited access to the original material.

== Discovery ==
Considered lost for many years, the film was rediscovered in 2023 in the Czech Film Archive, a cinema library located in Prague, Czech Republic. In February 2023, the Czech Film Archive contacted Jay Weissberg, director of the Pordenone Silent Film Festival, and presented him with a digital copy produced in 1981 from a now-lost nitrate film. The material was titled The Wonders of the Amazon, miscatalogued as an American production and dated 1925. Weissberg theorized that the film was older than reported and reached out to Sávio Luís Stoco, a professor at the Federal University of Pará and an expert on Silvino Santos' work, to verify the film's origins.

The digital copy was examined by the Cinemateca Brasileira, which confirmed the theory that it was indeed Silvino Santos' film. The title cards were translated into Portuguese, and a soundtrack was composed by Luís Henrique Xavier, a flautist and professor of composition, theory, and analysis at the music department of State University of Campinas. The work was further analyzed by Italian specialists, and Stoco stated, "It's basically a miracle. We didn't have the slightest hope that this work would one day be found."

== Releases ==
The film, under the title The Wonders of the Amazon, was first screened in London on 12 February 1922, and was shown over the next decade in Britain, France, Italy, Czechoslovakia, and Spain.

After its rediscovery, it was presented on 10 October 2023, at the Pordenone Silent Film Festival. The film premiered in Brazil at the Cinemateca Brasileira in São Paulo on 22 November 2023. It was also shown at Cinépolis in João Pessoa on 1 December, at the Museum of Modern Art of Rio de Janeiro on 7 December, at the Cine Teatro São Luiz in Fortaleza on 22 December, and at the Amazon Theatre in Manaus on 29 December. In September 2024, the full film was made available in the Brazilian Cinematheque's Cultural Content Bank.

== Bibliography ==
- Stoco, Sávio Luis (31 July 2019). O Cinema de Silvino Santos (1918 - 1922) e a representação amazônica: história, arte e sociedade (Postgraduate Program in Media and Audiovisual Processes thesis) (in Brazilian Portuguese). São Paulo: University of São Paulo. doi:10.11606/t.27.2019.tde-31072019-115319.
