= 1879 in Brazil =

Events in the year 1879 in Brazil.

== Incumbents ==
- Monarch: Pedro II
- Prime Minister: Viscount of Sinimbu

== Births ==
- July 9 - Carlos Chagas, bacteriologist (d. 1934)
