= Saasen station =

Railway station in Germany

Saasen
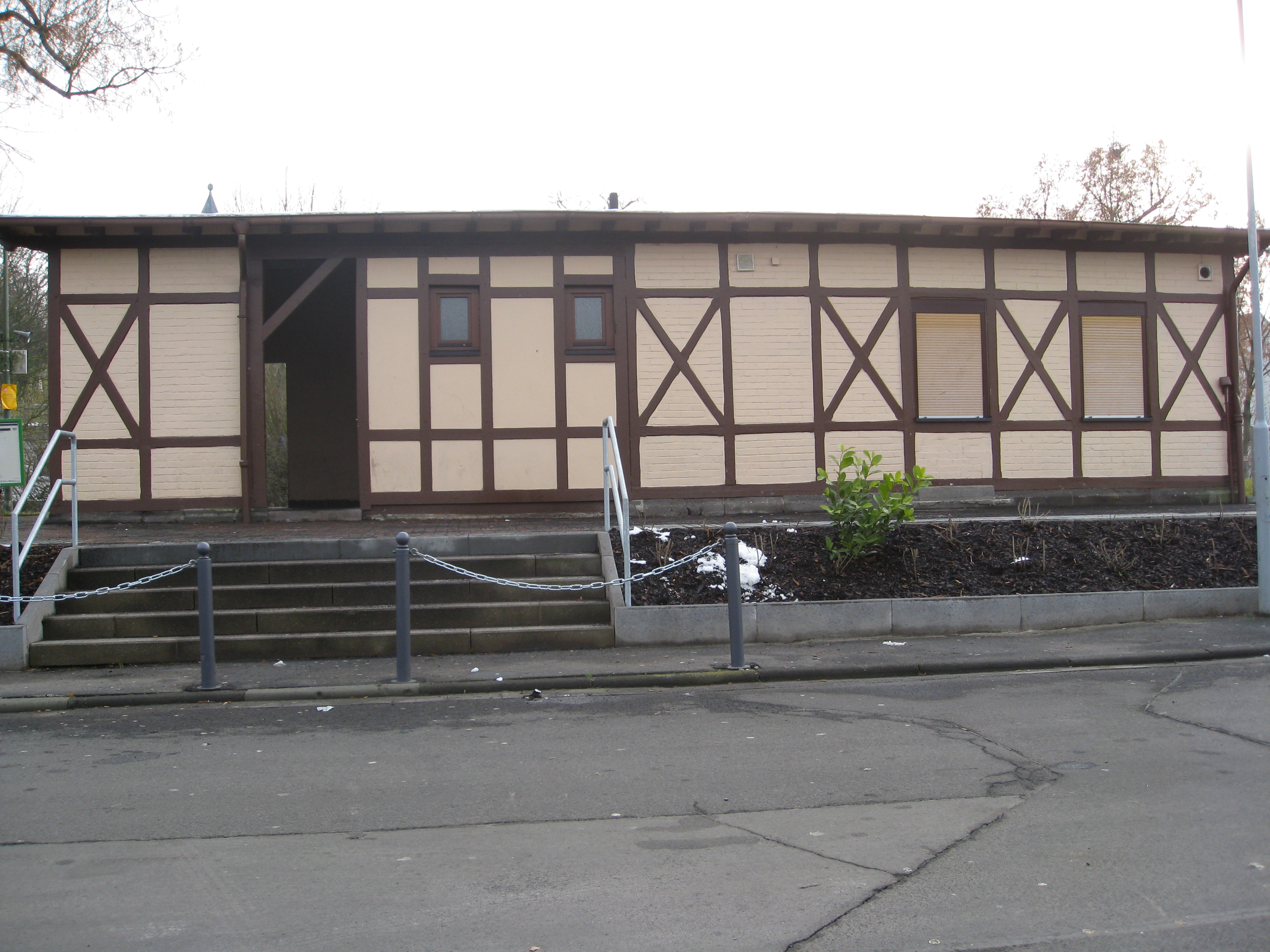

General information
- Location: Wieseckstraße 1, Saasen, Hesse; Germany
- Coordinates: 50°35′38″N 8°52′53″E
- Line: Vogelsberg Railway
- Platforms: 1

Construction
- Accessible: Yes

Other information
- Station code: 5460
- DS100 code: FSAA
- IBNR: 8005249
- Category: 7
- Fare zone: : 1563
- Website: www.bahnhof.de

Services
Preceding station	Hessische Landesbahn	Following station
Reiskirchen (Kr Gießen) towards Limburg (Lahn)	RB 45	Göbelnrod towards Fulda
Location

Saasen (German: Bahnhof Saasen) is a station in Saasen, Hesse, Germany.

== Rail services ==
The station is served daily by hourly Regionalbahn (RB 45) services on the Limburg (Lahn)–Weilburg–Wetzlar–Gießen–Alsfeld (Oberhess)–Fulda route. In the peak, additional Regionalbahn services run on the Gießen–Grünberg–Mücke route.

Line	Route	Interval
RB 45	Regionalbahn; Limburg (Lahn) – Eschhofen – Weilburg – Wetzlar – Gießen – Saasen – Grünberg (Oberhess) – Mücke (Hess) – Alsfeld (Oberhess) – Fulda	Hourly (+ extra trains in peak hour)
