= Wieseck (river) =

River in Germany

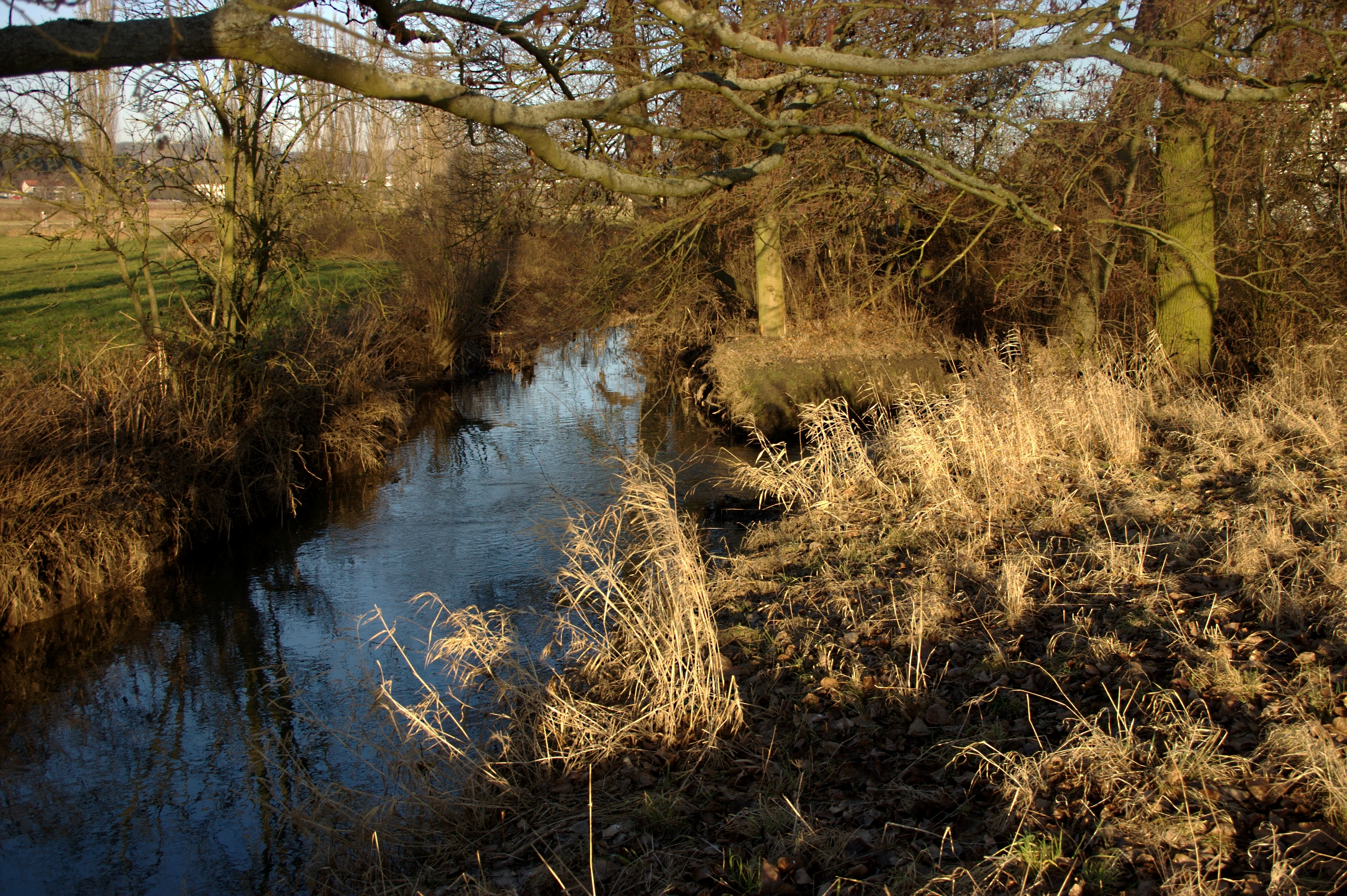
- View of Wieseck near Saasen

Location
- Country: Germany
- State: Hesse

Physical characteristics
- Source
  - location: Lumda Plateau, north-west of Grünberg
- Mouth
  - location: Lahn in Giessen
  - coordinates: 50.5831°N 8.6607°E
- Length: 24.3 km (15.1 mi)

Basin features
- Progression: Lahn→ Rhine→ North Sea

The Wieseck is a river in Hesse, Germany. It is a left tributary (east) of the Lahn in the Vorderer Vogelsberg region. It rises in Saasen and after 24.3 kilometres, flows into the Lahn at Giessen, near the railway station. The Giessen suburb of Wieseck is named after the river.

== Natural geography and use ==
The Wieseck valley roughly forms the southern boundary of the Lumda Plateau, the central plateau of the Vorderer Vogelsberg. The Wieseck meadows between Großen-Buseck and the centre of Giessen are a popular recreation area for the people of Giessen.

== Water quality ==
The saprobic index in the middle reaches of the Wieseck (at Großen-Buseck) is 1.77 which is considered "good" according to the WFD standards. In the lower reaches, within the urban area, it is 2.34, which is classified as "moderate". The structural condition, however, should be classified as "poor". Morphologically, large sections of the Wieseck are severely impaired. Almost 96% of the sections were "significantly distorted" or worse. Only about 4% were classified as having moderate levels of distortion or better, which is the target. Several other indices calculated by evaluating the colonization of the Wieseck with aquatic organisms (macrobenthos), confirm this poor condition. These values, which indicate structural impairment of the river, show that the middle reaches of the Wieseck at Großen-Buseck are "unsatisfactory", and the lower reaches in the urban area are "poor". Thus, on the basis of the WFD, which requires a "good ecological condition" by 2015, action is necessary to improve the condition of the river. Such action is envisaged in the coming years.

== See also ==
- List of rivers of Hesse
