= Brazilian Forest Code =

The Brazilian Forest Code is a piece of legislation passed in 1965. There has been controversy over the code, mostly centered on legal requirement for landowners in the Brazilian Amazon to maintain 80% of forests as legal reserves. This particular requirement has never been effectively implemented and implementation has again been delayed by President Luiz Inácio Lula da Silva until June 2011. The original law, passed in 1965, required only 50%. Neither this nor the 80% requirement have ever been prosecuted. This had been expected to change with harsher and criminal penalties to be introduced in 2009. Then President Luiz Inácio Lula da Silva however, delayed this until the post election period in 2011, though Presidential Decree number 7029.

While the measure has never been formally adopted into law it has been estimated that other Government policies have reduced logging from 21.5 thousand square kilometers in 2002 to 7.0 thousand in 2009. The code remains an enduring source of controversy for environmentalists and agriculturalists.

On 28 February 2018, Supreme Federal Court upheld forestry law changes which comes as a blow to environmentalists trying to protect the world's largest rain forest. According to environmentalists, the revised laws which are also known as the forest code, would give a rise to illegal deforestation, whereas the farmers and the agricultural lobby welcomes the new law and suggest that it is going to be pivotal for the growth of agricultural sector of the Brazilian economy.

== Modification ==
A modification of the Brazilian Forest Code (Law project 1.876/99) was proposed. It passed both houses of the Parliament of Brazil, but former president Dilma Rousseff vetoed some of its proportions. Environmentalists were opposed to the law, and said it would to further destruction of the Amazon rainforest, and would have opened areas logged illegally before July 2008 for farming. The Catholic Church urged Rousseff to completely veto the bill, and Avaaz, a global activist group, collected two million signatures opposing the legislation.

== See also ==
- 1965 in the environment
- Energy law
- Environmental law
