= Silvino Santos =

Portuguese-born cinematographer

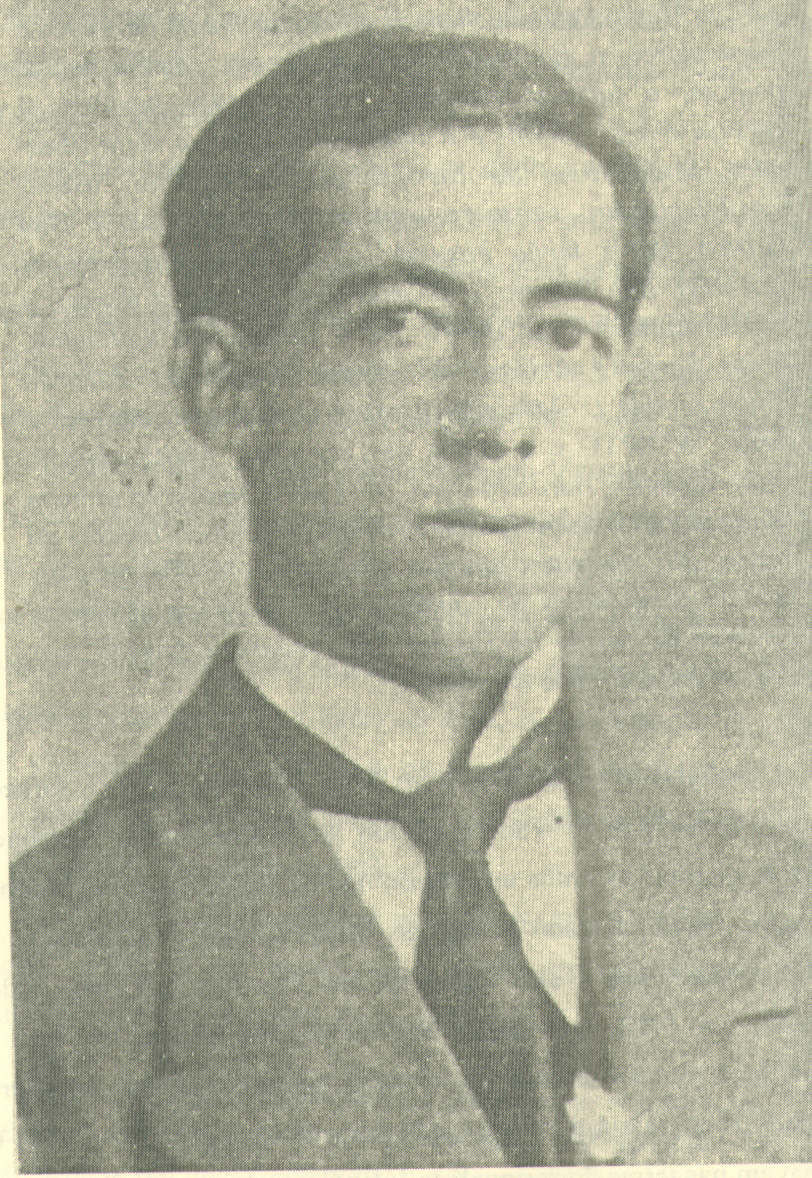
- Born: 1886; Cernache do Bonjardim, Portugal
- Died: 14 May 1970 (aged 83–84); Manaus, Brazil
- Occupations: Cinematographer, photographer

Silvino Simões Santos Silva (1886 – 14 May 1970) was a Portuguese-born cinematographer and photographer who emigrated and worked in Brazil. He is known for his role as director of the 1922 film No País das Amazonas, which was one of the earliest documentary films that depicted the Amazon rainforest. In addition to directing various other films about Brazil, Santos documented an expedition with the explorers Theodor Koch-Grunberg and Alexander H. Rice Jr. which was released as the 1924 film No Rastro do Eldorado.

== Biography ==
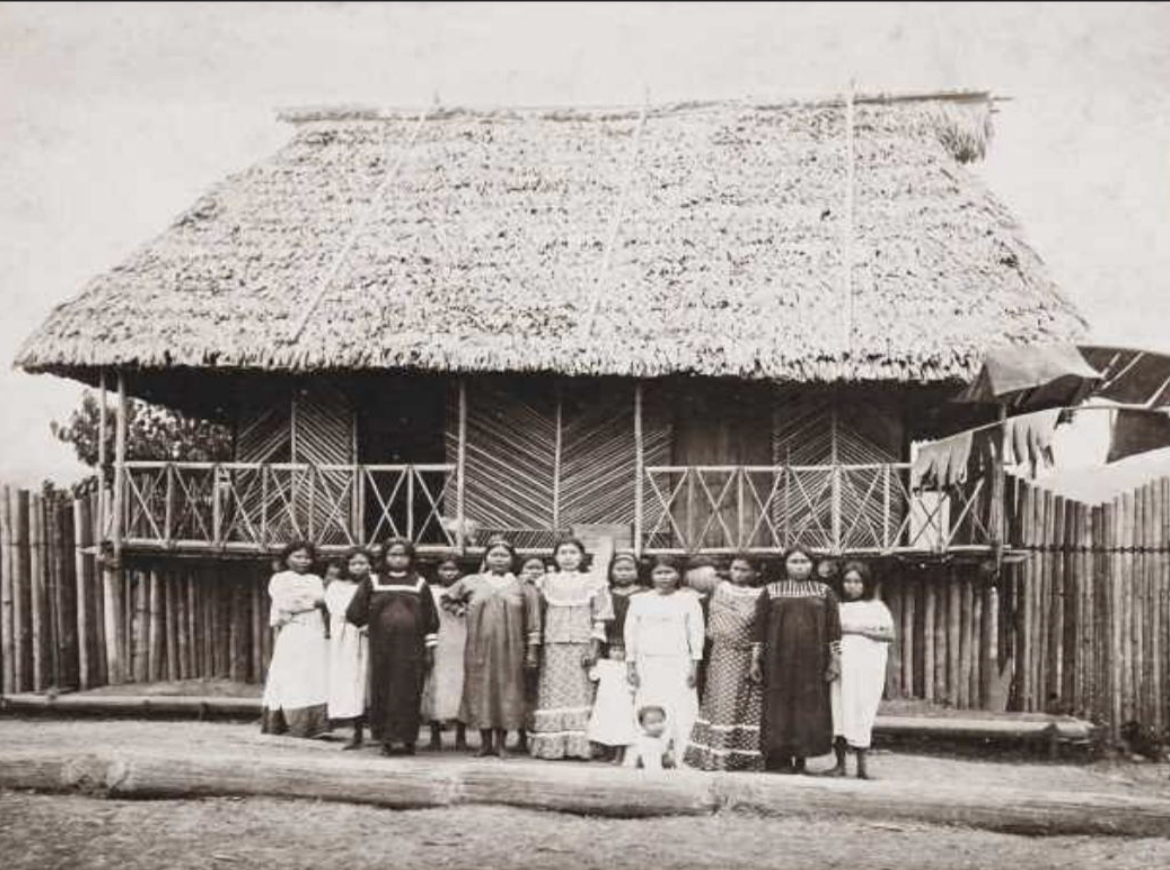
Harem of concubines belonging to Andres O'Donnell, photograph taken by Silvino Santos in 1912.

Born in Portugal, Santos left for Brazil early in his life. He practiced photography and was supported by the entrepreneur Julio César Arana, who was involved in the Amazon rubber industry and the Putumayo genocide. Arana sponsored Santos' trip to Paris in the early 1910s, where he experimented with cinematography through the Lumiere Brothers' inventions. Upon returning to Brazil with cinema film supplies, Santos created a film documenting Arana's rubber plantations along the Putomayo River. In 1912 more than 200 photographs taken by Santos in the Putumayo were published in Álbum de Fotografías: Viaje de la Comisión Consular al Río Putumayo y Afluentes. He spent two months filming in the Putumayo near the end of 1913, however most of his work from this time period was destroyed when a ship containing the negatives was hit by a torpedo from a German U-boat in 1914. Santos settled in Manaus and around 1918 became involved in Amazônia Cine Film, a production company in the region.

In 1918, Santos completed a documentary film on the Amazon, Amazonas, o Maior Rio do Mundo, filmed in Peru and Brazil. It included coverage of rituals of the Witoto people as well as wildlife and the exploitation of the river for timber, rubber, Brazil nuts, fish, and egret feathers for fashion. In a memoir he wrote in the 1960s, Santos recounted how before the film was shown in Brazil, Propércio de Mello Saraiva, who had been tasked with negotiating a European distribution, took the only copy and passed it off as his own work; it was shown in England and elsewhere as Wonders of the Amazon and then lost. A negative copy of a print was rediscovered in an archive in the Czech Republic in 2023.

His 1922 film No País das Amazonas was met with acclaim and shown in Rio de Janeiro at the Palais Cinema and in Paris. Santos continued to create documentary films about life and culture in Brazil. These included a film about the 1922–1923 Independence Centenary International Exposition and another about life in Rio de Janeiro, the capital of the country at the time. He worked for Joaquim Gonçalves de Araújo, a Brazilian film producer, for the remainder of his life. Santos married Anna Maria Schermuly and had two children. His last feature-length documentary was created in 1957, but Santos continued to make short films until the end of his life in 1970.

== Filmography ==
- Rio Putumayo, 1914
- Amazonas, o Maior Rio do Mundo, 1918
- No País das Amazonas, 1922
- Terra Encantada, 1923
- No Rastro do Eldorado, 1924
- Sernache de Bonjardim, 1927
- Parada Militar de 11 de Novembro de 1927, 1927
- Amendoeiras em Flor, 1929
- Terra Portuguesa, o Minho, 1934
- Santa Maria da Villa Amazónia, 1957
