= Grünberg, Hesse =

Grünberg
- Town
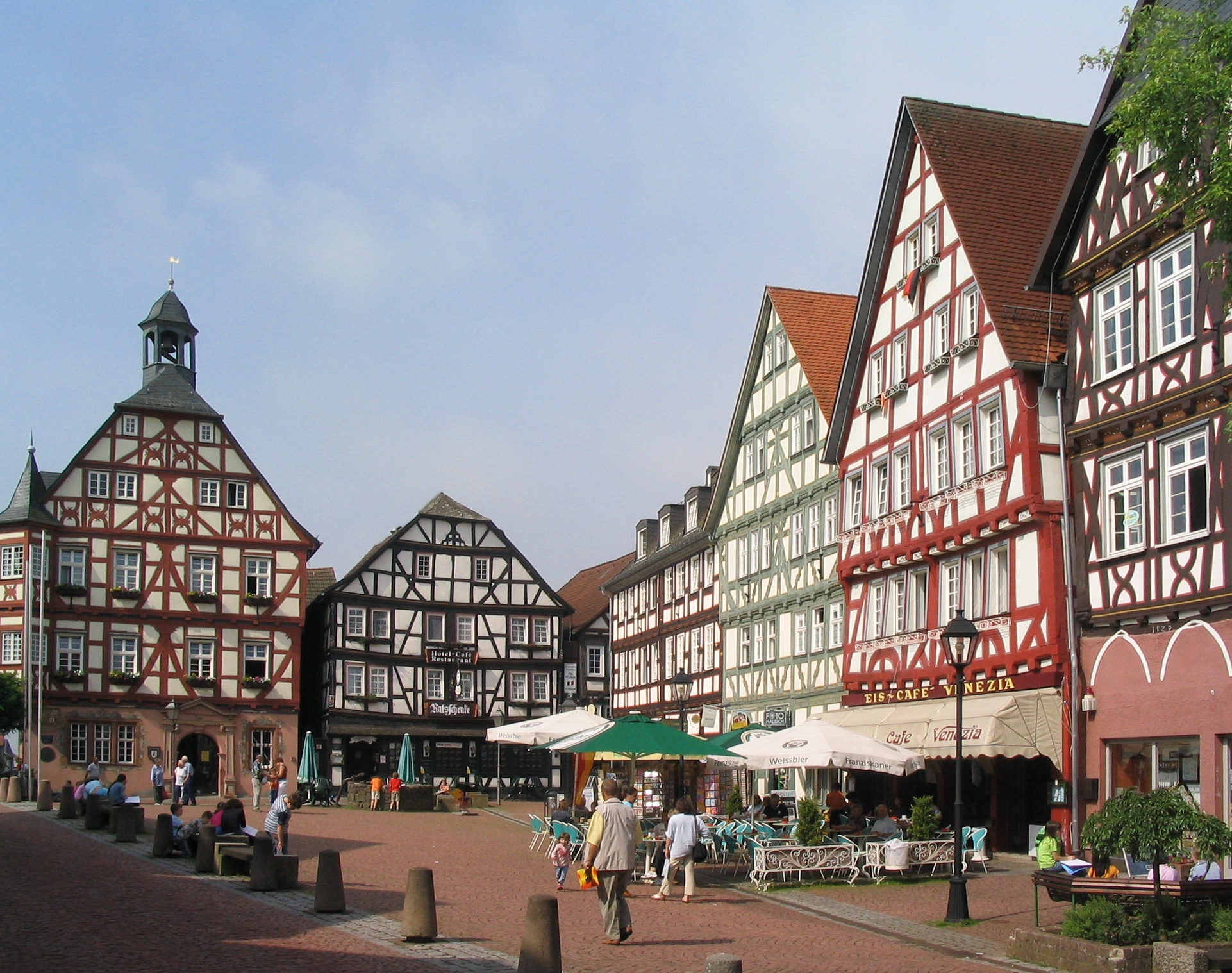
- Market square

- Coat of arms

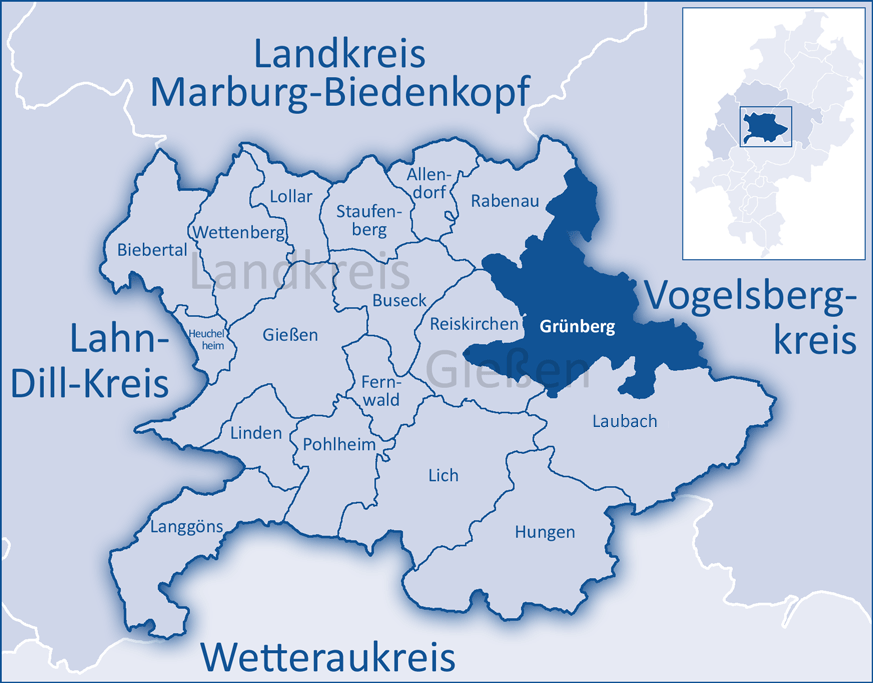
- Location of Grünberg within Gießen district
- Interactive map of Grünberg
- Location within Germany Location within Hesse
- Coordinates: 50°36′N 08°57′E
- Country: Germany
- State: Hesse
- Admin. region: Gießen
- District: Gießen

Government
  - Mayor (2021–27): Marcel Schlosser (CDU)

Area
  - Total: 89.22 km^{2} (34.45 sq mi)
- Elevation: 275 m (902 ft)

Population (2025-12-31)
  - Total: 13,627
  - Density: 152.7/km^{2} (395.6/sq mi)
- Time zone: UTC+01:00 (CET)
  - Summer (DST): UTC+02:00 (CEST)
- Postal codes: 35305
- Dialling codes: 06401 (06634)
- Vehicle registration: GI

Grünberg (German pronunciation: [ˈɡʁyːnbɛʁk]) is a town in the district of Gießen, in Hessen, Germany. In 1980, the town hosted the 20th Hessentag state festival.

== Geography ==
Grünberg is situated 20 km (12 mi) east of Gießen.

=== Neighbouring communities ===
To the north Grünberg borders the municipality Rabenau and the town Homberg (Ohm) (Vogelsbergkreis), to the east the municipality Mücke (Vogelsbergkreis), to the south the town Laubach and to the west the municipality Reiskirchen.

=== Constituent communities ===
The town of Grünberg also consists of the nearby villages of Beltershain, Göbelnrod, Harbach, Klein-Eichen, Lardenbach, Lehnheim, Lumda, Queckborn, Reinhardshain, Stangenrod, Stockhausen, Weickartshain and Weitershain.

== International relations ==
- Condom, southwestern France – since 1973
- Mrągowo, northeastern Poland – since 1993

== Education ==
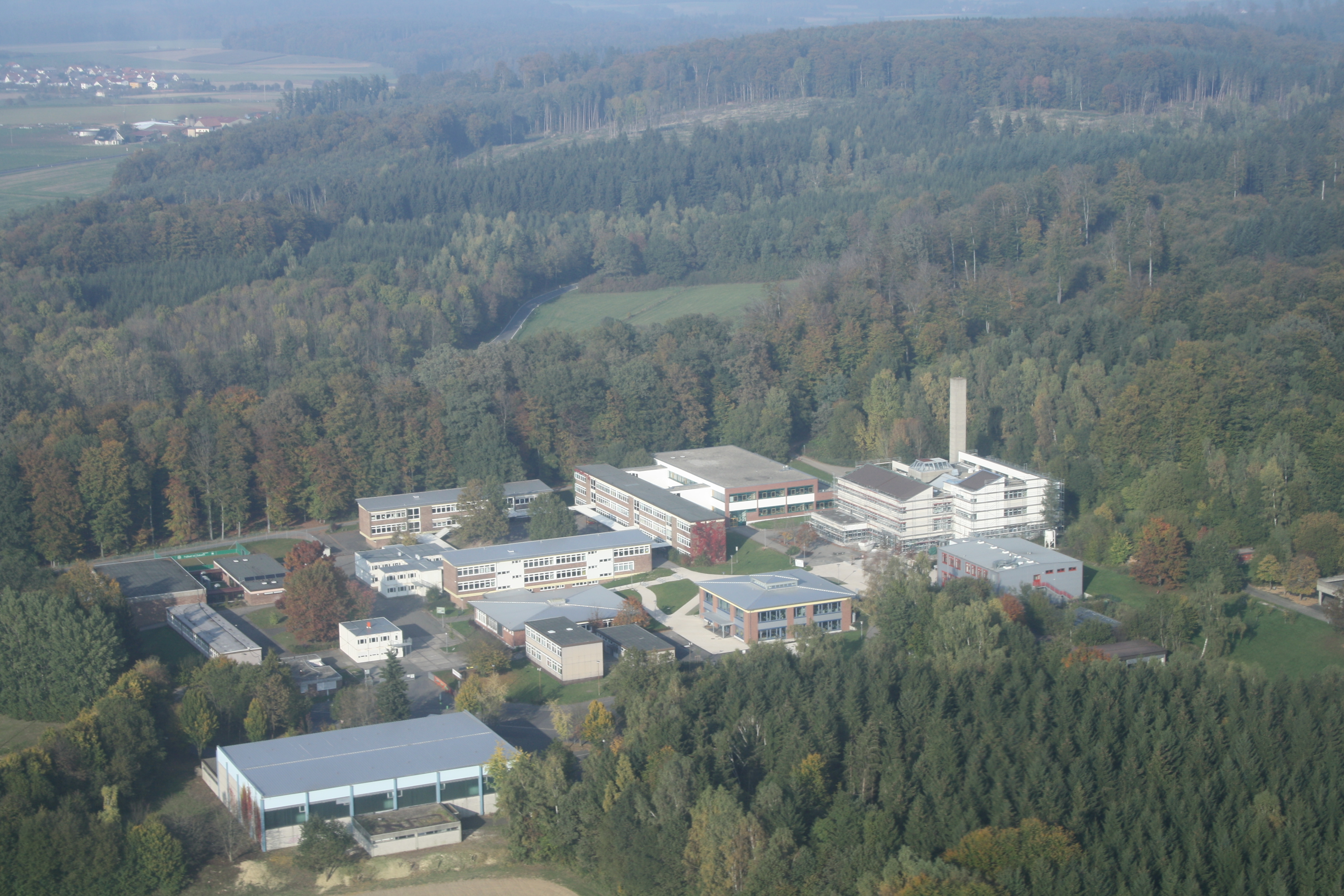
Air photograph of the Theo-Koch-School Grünberg, October 2010

- Theo-Koch-School, Grünberg – integrated comprehensive school with sixth form
- primary school Am Diebsturm, Grünberg
- primary school Sonnenberg, Stangenrod
- Gallus-School, Grünberg

== Transport ==
Grünberg has a junction of the Bundesautobahn 5. There are stations on the Vogelsberg Railway (Vogelsbergbahn) in the town of Grünberg (Grünberg station) and the villages Göbelnrod (Göbelnrod station) and Lehnheim (Lehnheim station).

== Gallery ==
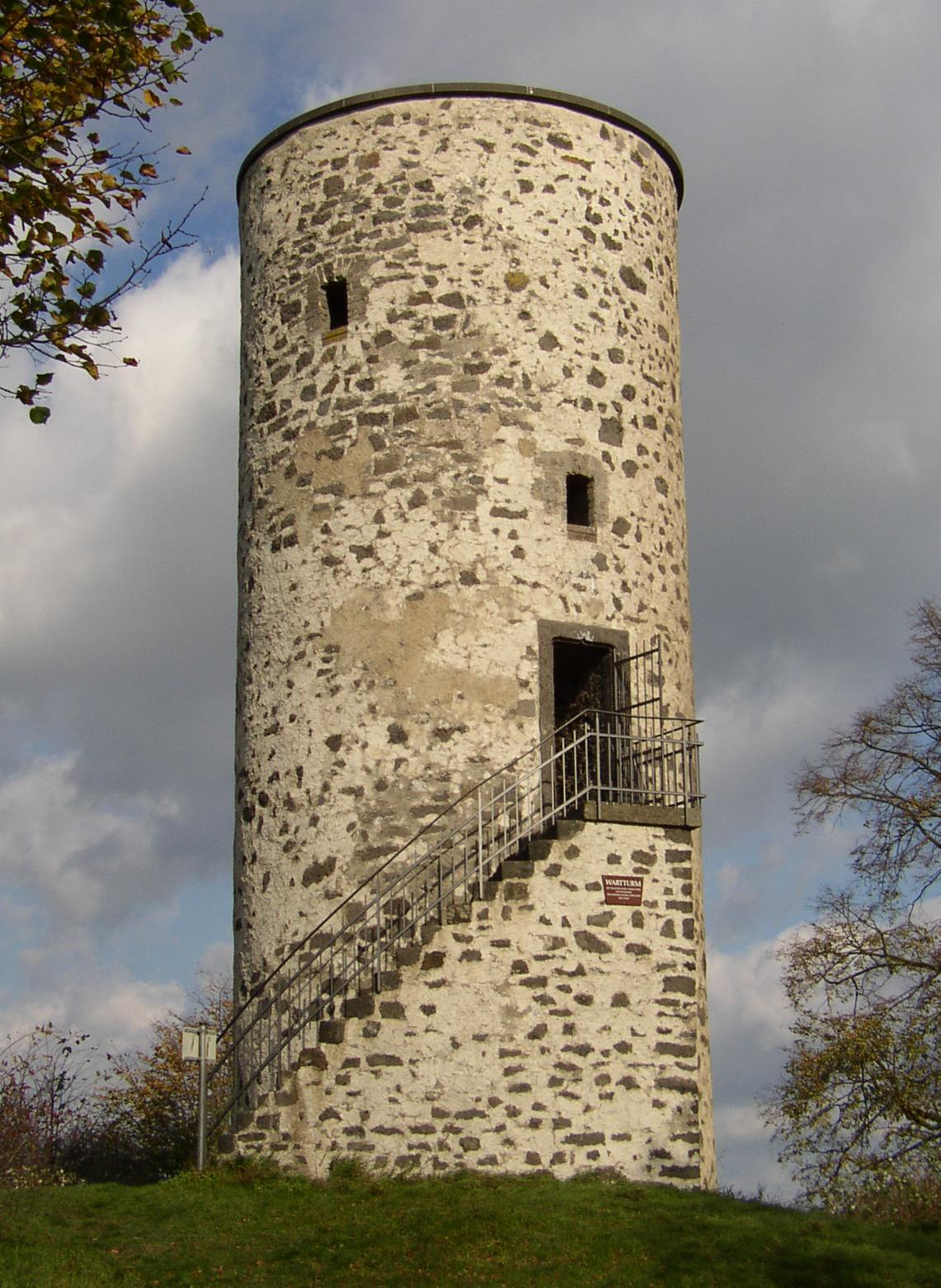
Tower in Grünberg in Hessen, Germany

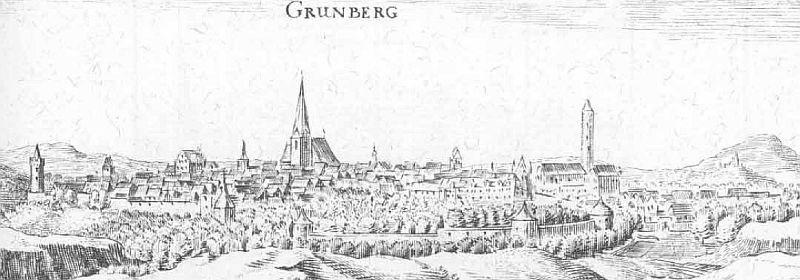
This is a scan of the historical document: Title: Grünberg - Topographia Hassiae language: German

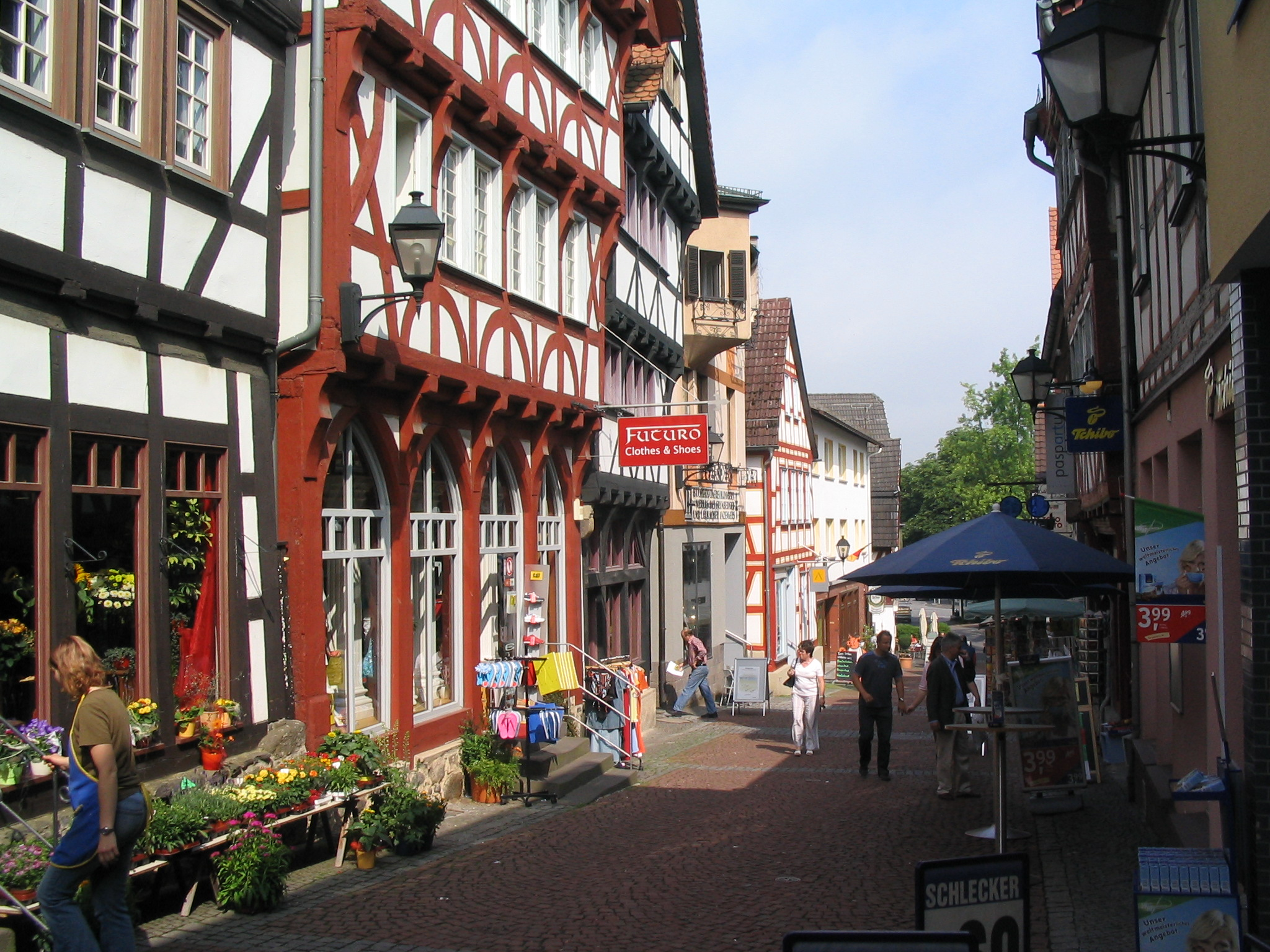
Street in Grünberg, Germany

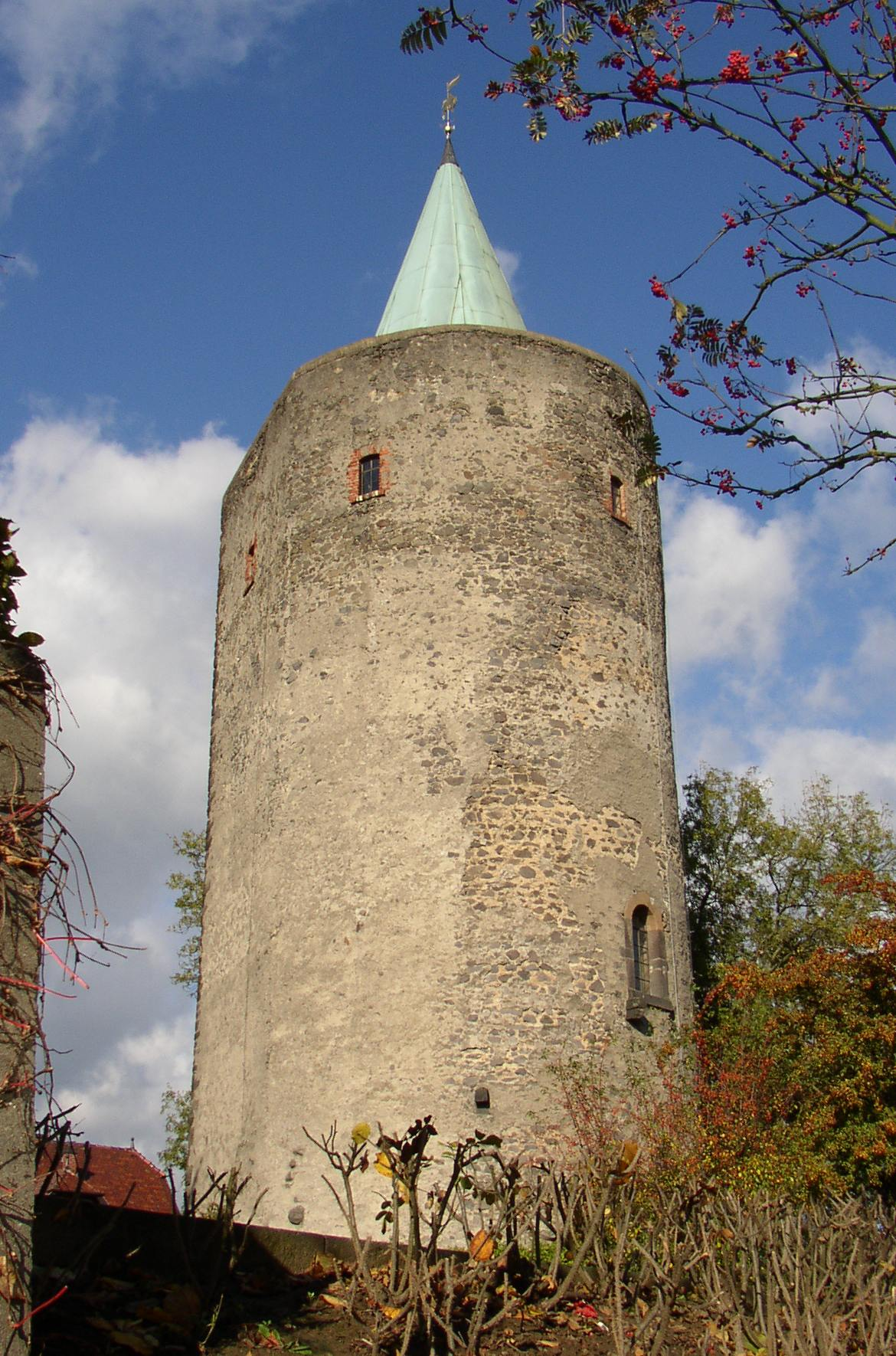
Tower in Grünberg in Hessen, Germany

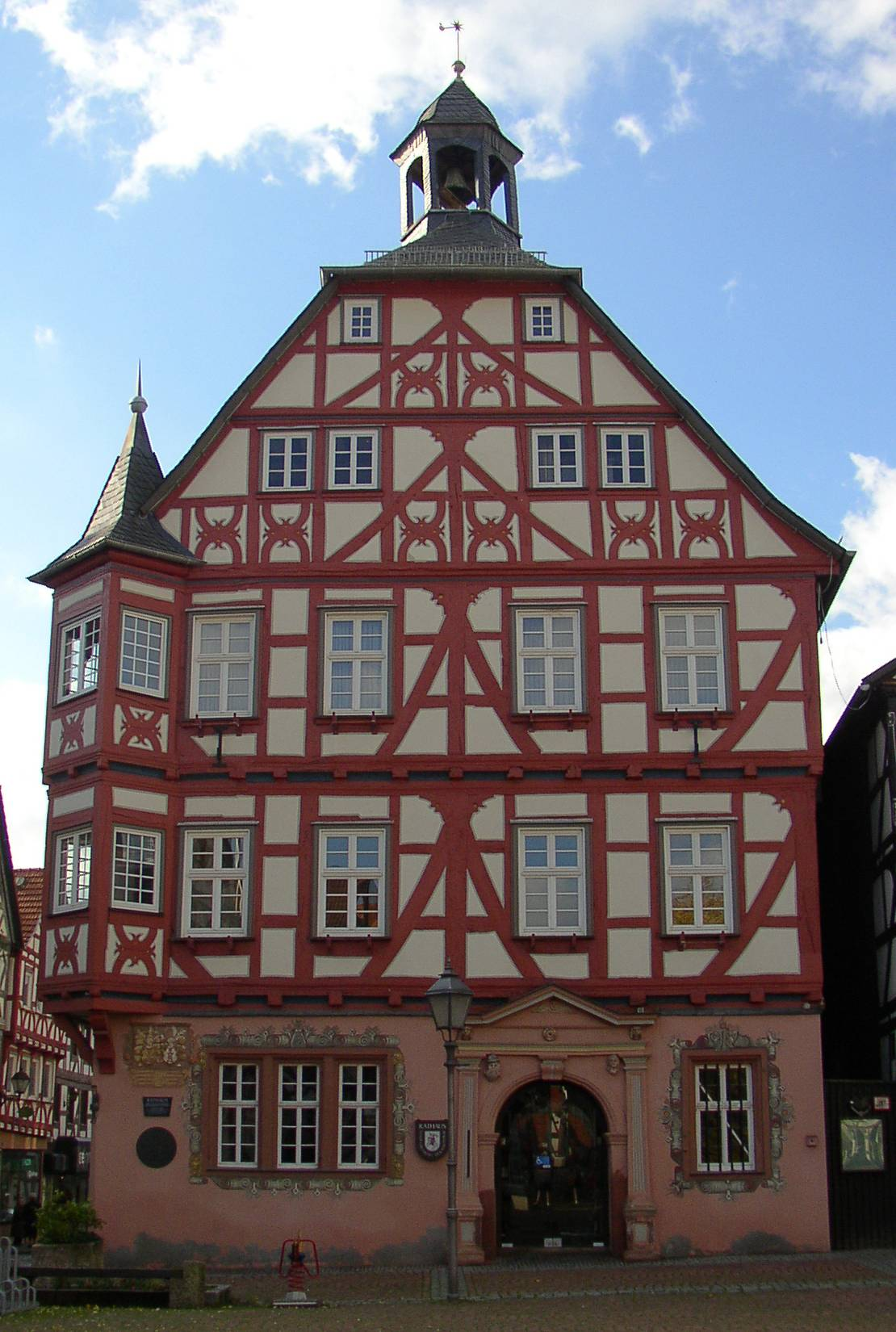
Town hall in Grünberg in Hessen, Germany

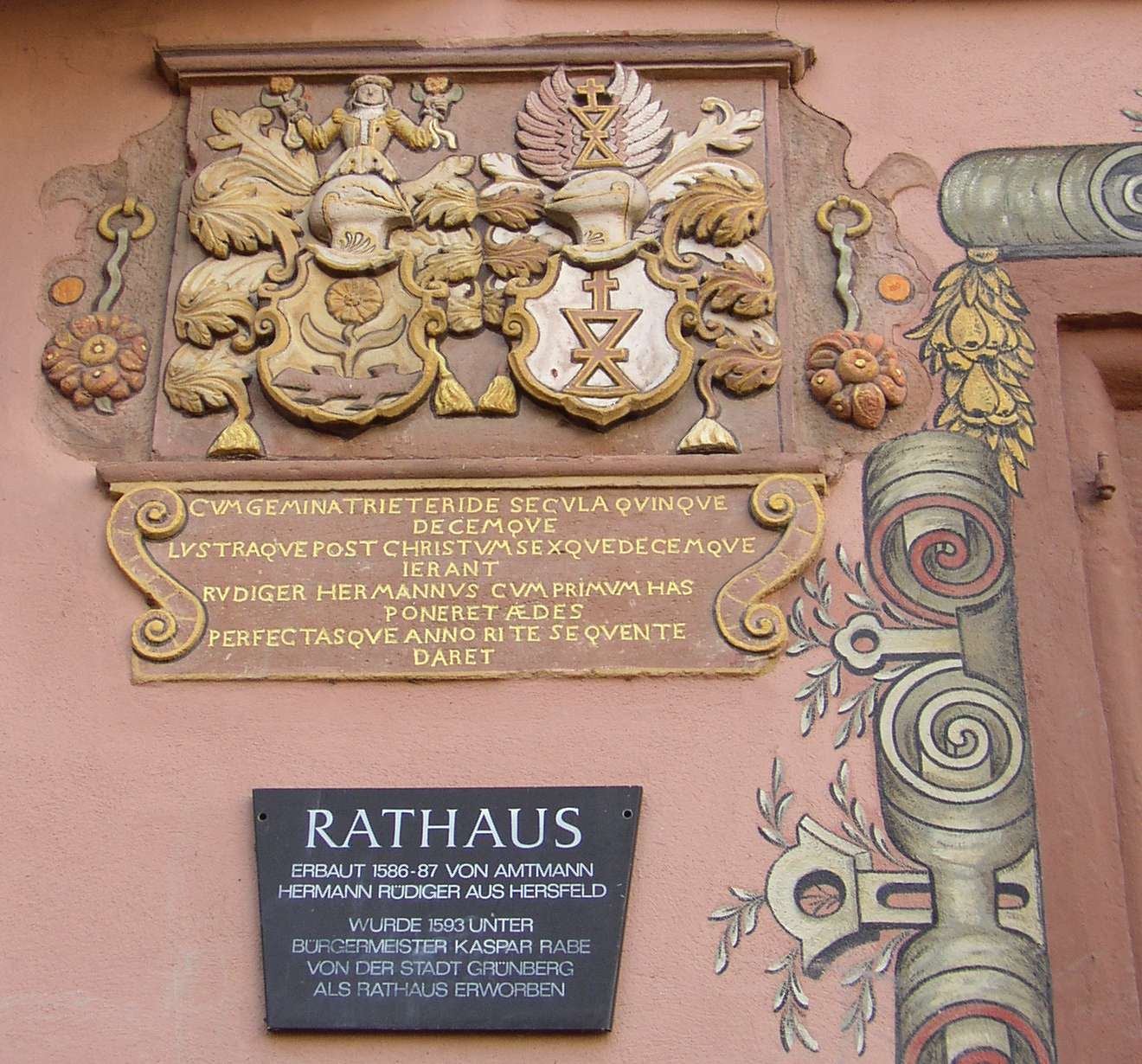
Detail of town hall in Grünberg in Hessen, Germany

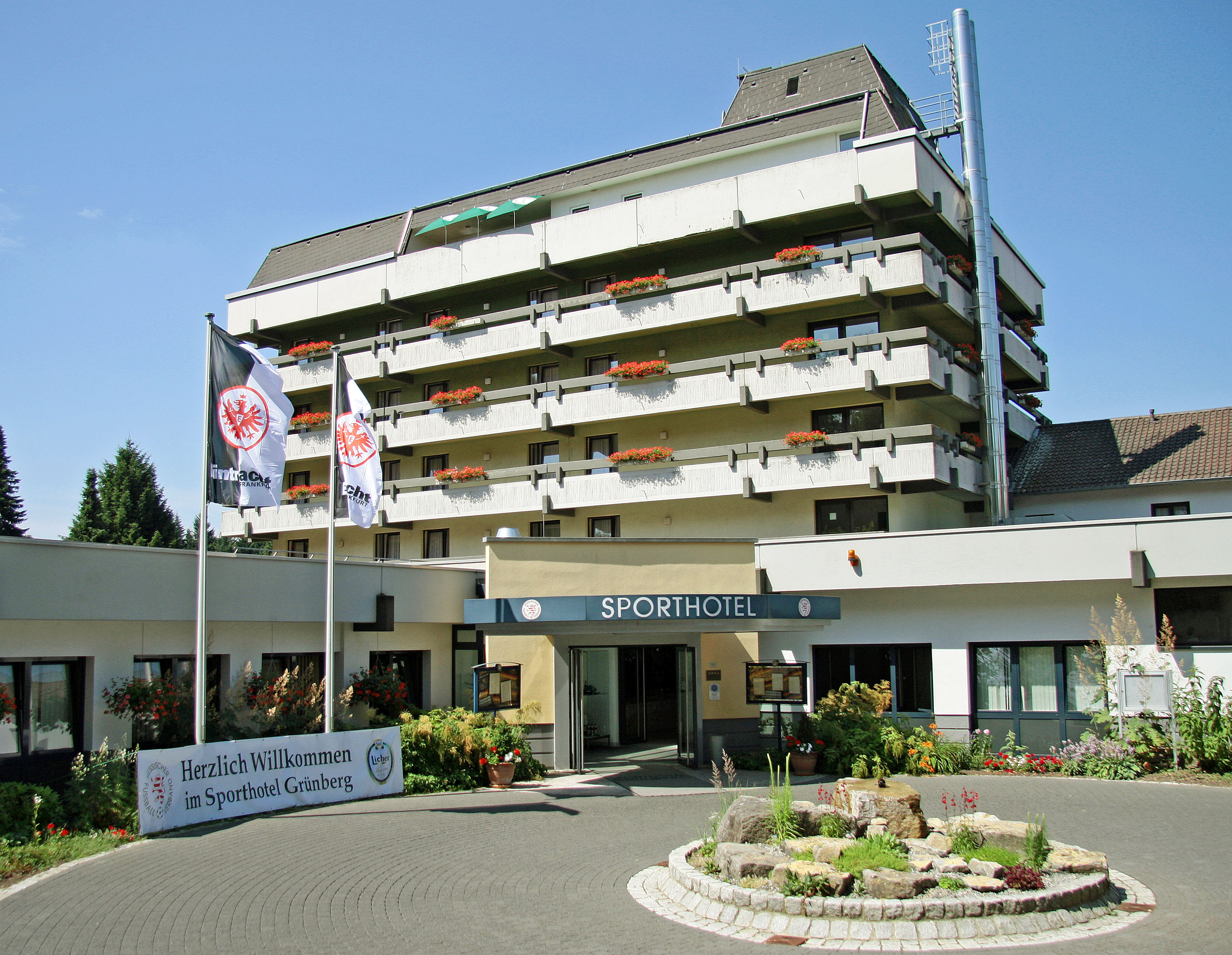
Sporthotel/Sportschule Grünberg, July 2010
