= Göbelnrod =

- Ortsteil of Grünberg
- Interactive map of Göbelnrod
- Location within Germany Location within Hesse
- Coordinates: 50°36′N 08°55′E
- Country: Germany
- State: Hesse
- Admin. region: Gießen
- District: Gießen
- Town: Grünberg

Government
  - Mayor: Jens Müll

Area
  - Total: 4.02 km^{2} (1.55 sq mi)
- Elevation: 309 m (1,014 ft)

Population (2020-12-31)
  - Total: 595
  - Density: 148/km^{2} (383/sq mi)
- Time zone: UTC+01:00 (CET)
  - Summer (DST): UTC+02:00 (CEST)
- Postal codes: 35305
- Dialling codes: 06401
- Vehicle registration: GI

Göbelnrod is a village and urban district of Grünberg in the district of Gießen, in Hesse, Germany.

== Geography ==
Göbelnrod is situated 2 km west of Grünberg and 20 km east of Gießen.

== Sights ==
- Wirberg, a former monastery west of the village
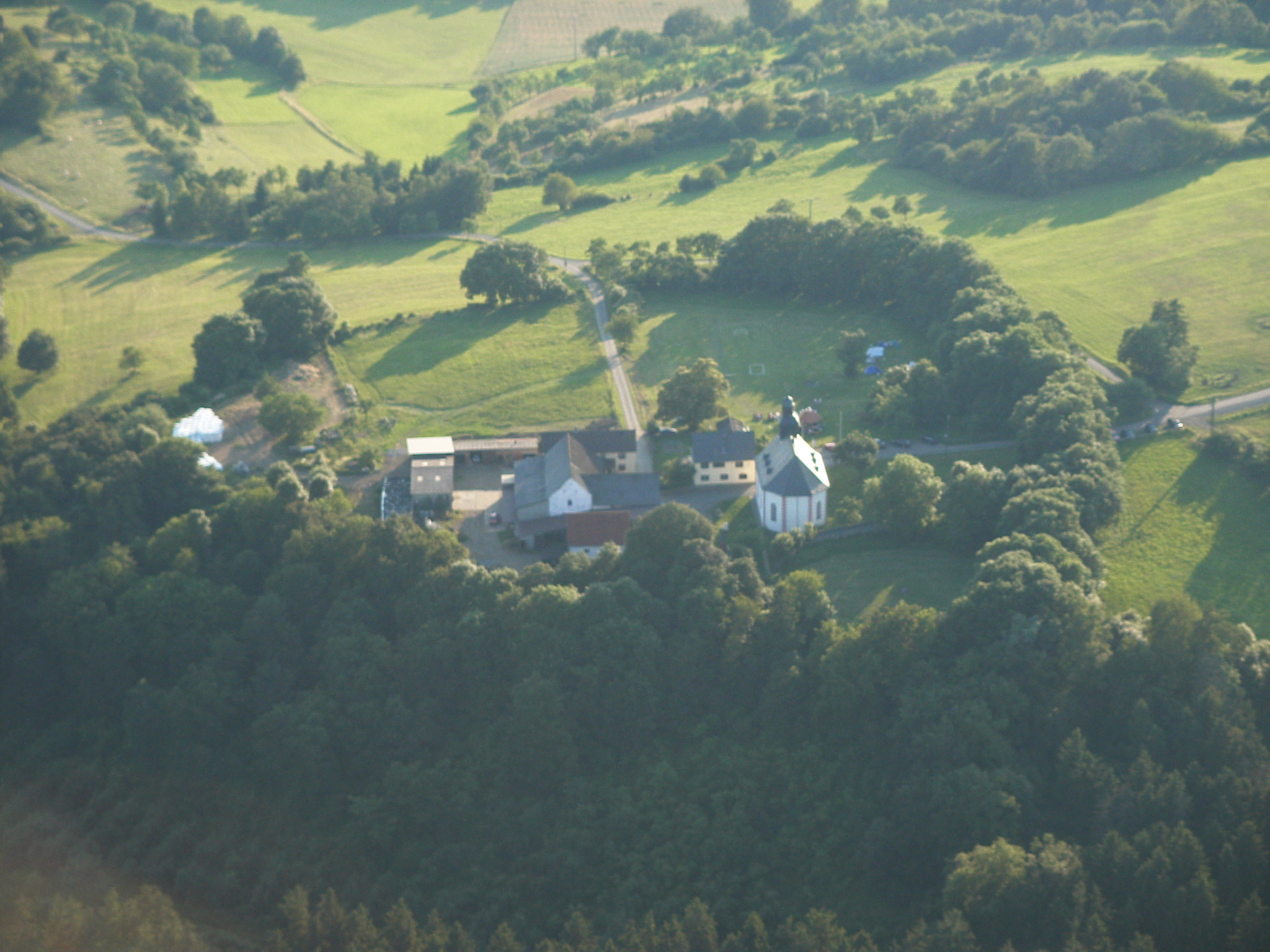
Air photograph of Wirberg near Göbelnrod, June 2002

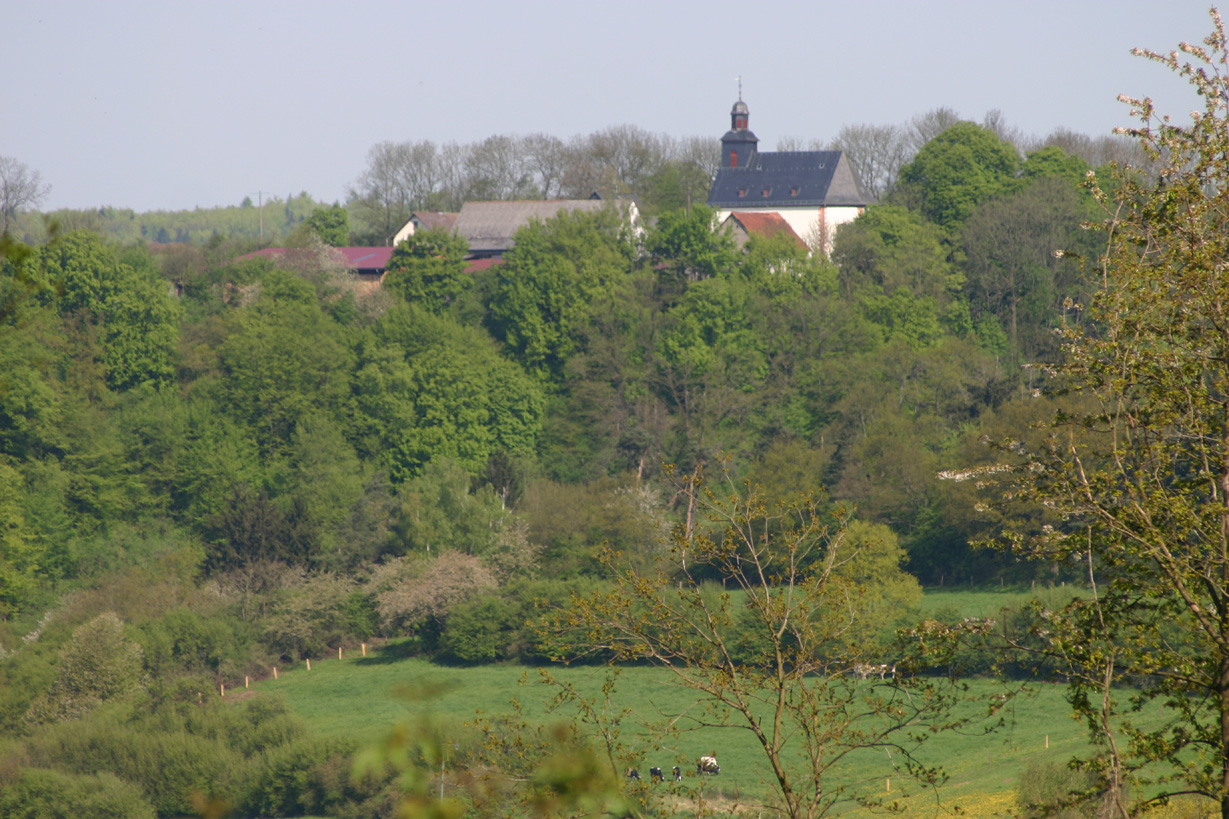
Wirberg near Göbelnrod, May 2008

== History ==
The village was first mentioned on December 5, 1310.

In documents of the 14th to 17th century the name appears in different spellings: Gebelenrade (1310), Gebelinrode, Gebillinroda, Gebillinrode (all 1320), Gebilnrode (1457), Gebelnraide, Gebeinrade (both 1480), Gobelnrade (1484), Gabelnrade (about 1487), Gebelnrode (1495), Gobelnrode (1499), Gobelnroidt (1518), Gibbelnrode (1527), Göbelnroda (1629)

== Population ==
Historical population

Year	Pop.
1804	242
1830	270 evangelical
1834	278
1840	257
1885	204
1905	247

Year	Pop.
1925	287
1938	ca. 300
1939	327
1950	526
1961	504
1969	508

Year	Pop.
1999	647
2005	724
2007	679
2008	678
2009	679
2010	668

== Gallery ==
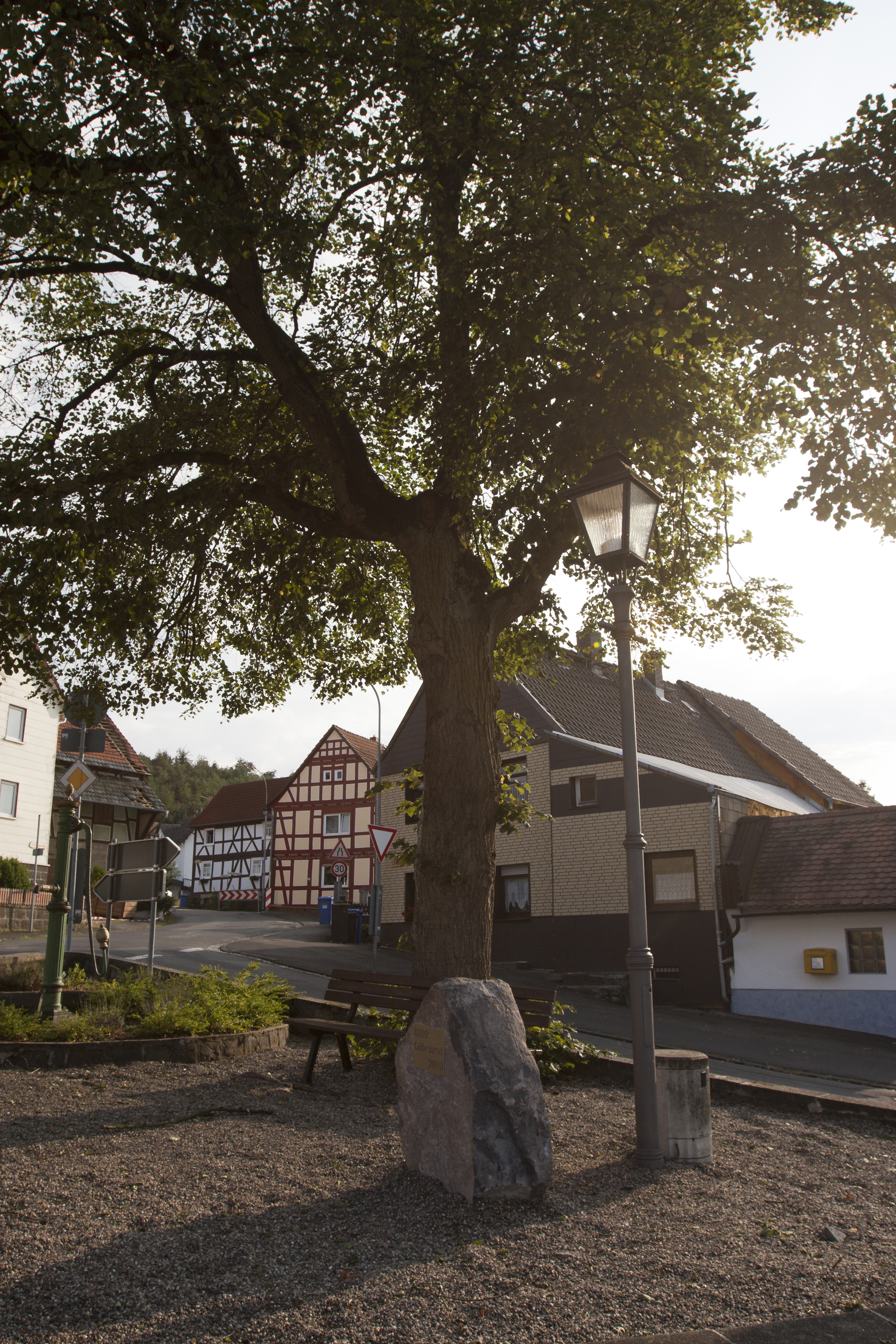
Village square with memorial stone in Göbelnrod, August 2011

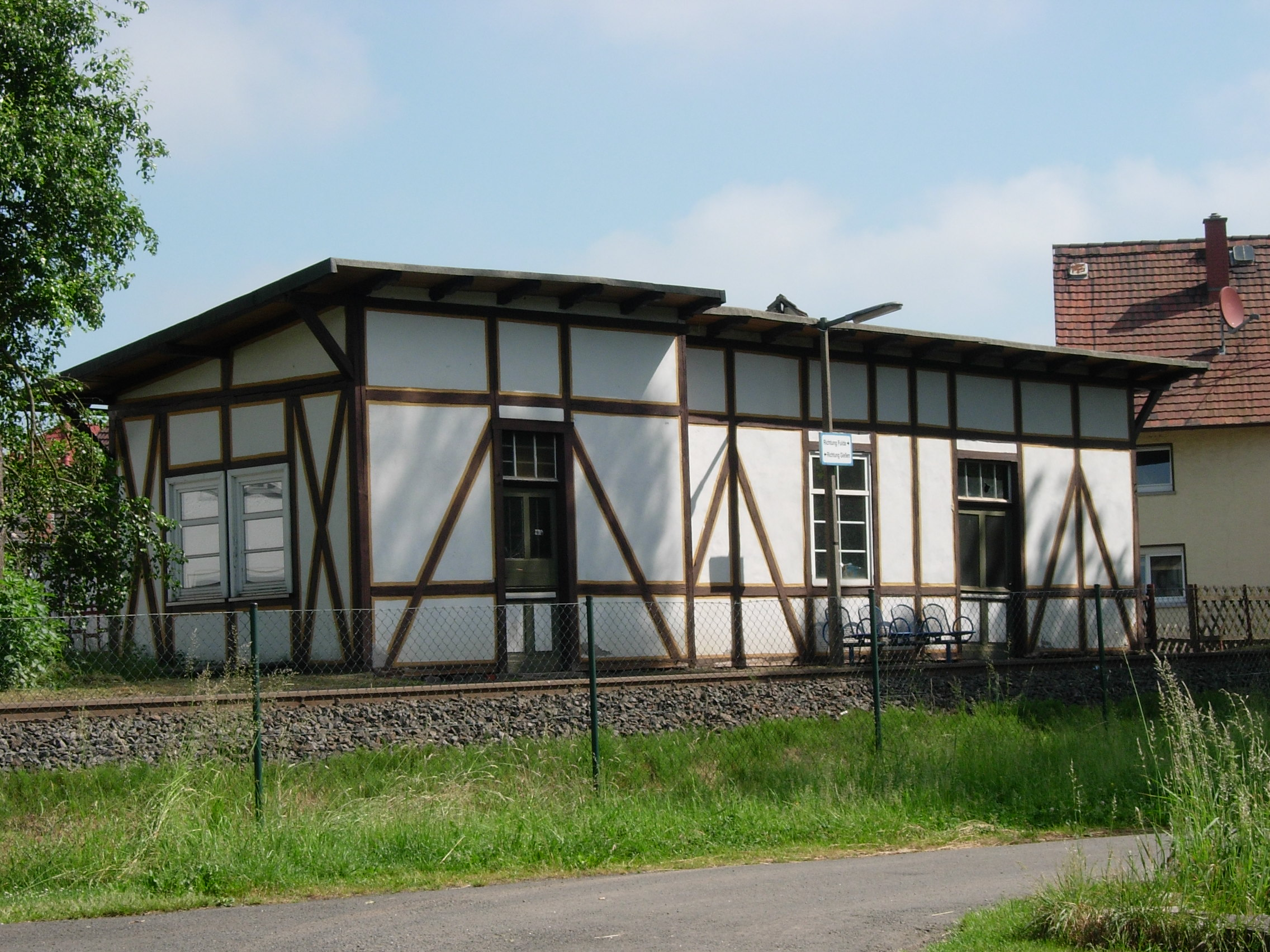
Station of Göbelnrod, June 2008

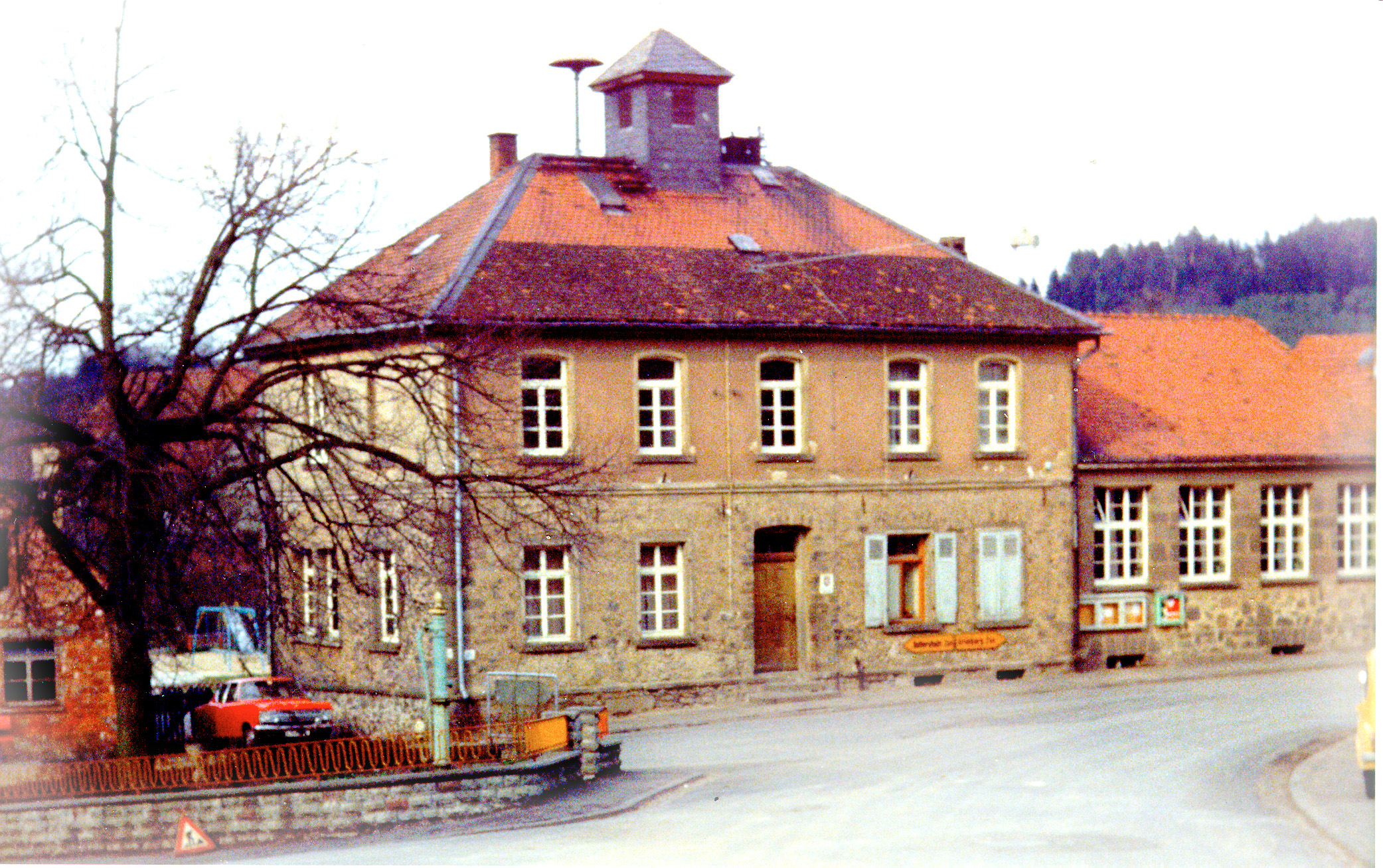
School of Göbelnrod, 1972

== Societies ==
- Carneval-Verein Göbelnrod 1973 e.V.
- Eintracht Fan-Club "Adlerkralle" Göbelnrod 1992
- Evangelische Frauenhilfe Göbelnrod, established 1932
- Freiwillige Feuerwehr Göbelnrod e.V., established 1952
- Gesangverein "Eintracht" Göbelnrod, established 1903
- Obst- und Gartenbauverein Göbelnrod, established 1936
- Sportverein 1927 Göbelnrod e.V.
- Tischtennisclub 1982 Göbelnrod
