= 1934 in Brazilian football =

Football in Brazil
- Season: 1934

The following article presents a summary of the 1934 football (soccer) season in Brazil, which was the 33rd season of competitive football in the country.

== Campeonato Paulista ==
Final Standings

Position	Team	Points	Played	Won	Drawn	Lost	For	Against	Difference
1	Palestra Itália-SP	25	14	12	1	1	45	8	37
2	São Paulo	23	14	10	3	1	34	12	22
3	Portuguesa	18	14	8	2	4	41	16	25
4	Corinthians	17	14	7	3	4	30	15	15
6	Santos	13	14	5	3	6	22	27	-5
7	Ypiranga-SP	8	14	3	2	9	21	42	-21
8	CA Paulista	6	14	2	2	10	15	41	-26
9	Sírio	2	14	1	0	13	10	57	-47

Palestra Itália-SP declared as the Campeonato Paulista champions.

== State championship champions ==
State	Champion	State	Champion
Acre	-	Paraíba	Cabo Branco
Alagoas	not disputed	Paraná	Atlético Paranaense
Amapá	-	Pernambuco	Náutico
Amazonas	Portuguesa-AM	Piauí	-
Bahia	Bahia	Rio de Janeiro	-
Ceará	Fortaleza	Rio de Janeiro (DF)	Botafogo (by AMEA); Vasco (by LFC)
Espírito Santo	Rio Branco-ES	Rio Grande do Norte	ABC
Goiás	-	Rio Grande do Sul	Internacional
Maranhão	Sampaio Corrêa	Rondônia	-
Mato Grosso	-	Santa Catarina	Atlético Catarinense
Minas Gerais	Villa Nova	São Paulo	Palestra Itália-SP
Pará	Paysandu	Sergipe	Palestra-SE

== Other competition champions ==
Competition	Champion
Campeonato Brasileiro de Seleções Estaduais	São Paulo; Bahia^{(1)}

^{(1)}Two different Campeonato Brasileiro de Seleções Estaduais editions were contested in 1934. The professional competition was organized by the FBF (Federação Brasileira de Futebol) while the amateur competition was organized by the CBD (Confederação Brasileira de Desportos). São Paulo won the professional competition while Bahia won the amateur one.

== Brazil national team ==
The following table lists all the games played by the Brazil national football team in official competitions and friendly matches during 1934.

Date	Opposition	Result	Score	Brazil scorers	Competition
May 27, 1934	Spain	L	1-3	Leônidas da Silva	World Cup
June 3, 1934	Yugoslavia	L	4-8	Leônidas da Silva (2), Armandinho, Waldemar de Brito	International Friendly
