= Reiskirchen =

- Municipality
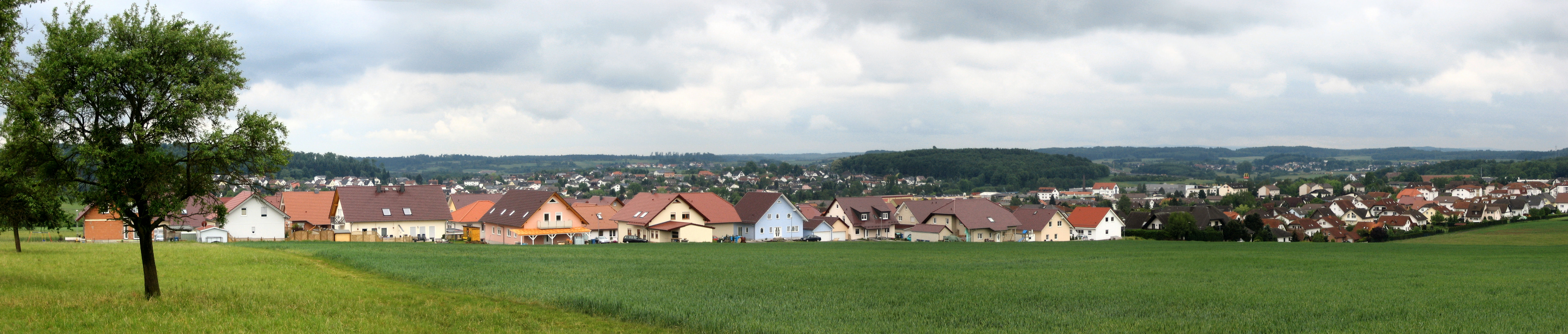
- Panorama of Reiskirchen

- Coat of arms

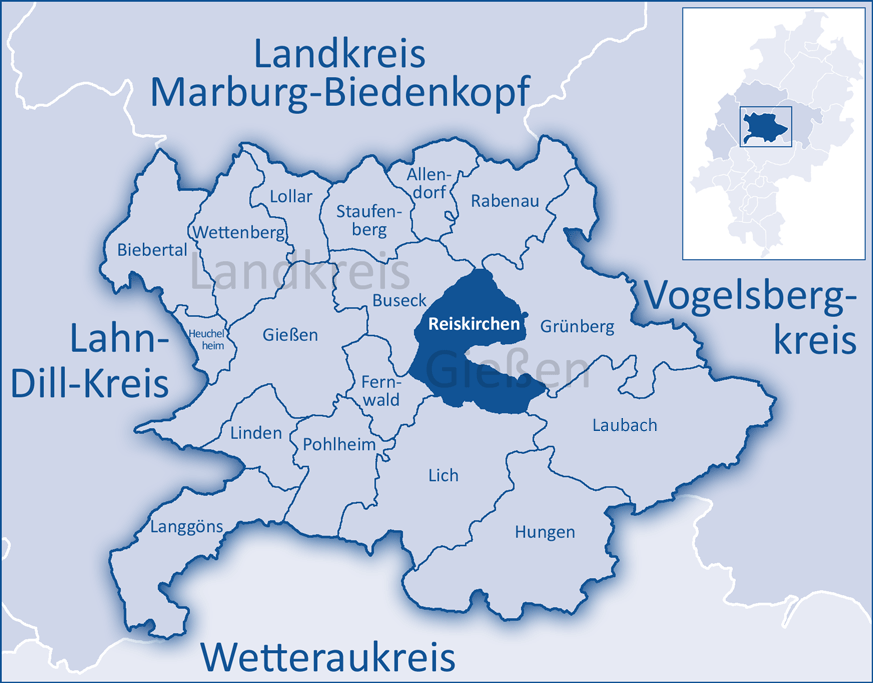
- Location of Reiskirchen within Gießen district
- Interactive map of Reiskirchen
- Location within Germany Location within Hesse
- Coordinates: 50°36′N 08°50′E
- Country: Germany
- State: Hesse
- Admin. region: Gießen
- District: Gießen
- Subdivisions: 8 Ortsteile

Government
  - Mayor (2018–24): Dietmar Kromm (Ind.)

Area
  - Total: 44.99 km^{2} (17.37 sq mi)
- Elevation: 230 m (750 ft)

Population (2025-12-31)
  - Total: 10,307
  - Density: 229.1/km^{2} (593.4/sq mi)
- Time zone: UTC+01:00 (CET)
  - Summer (DST): UTC+02:00 (CEST)
- Postal codes: 35447
- Dialling codes: 06408 / 06401
- Vehicle registration: GI
- Website: www.gemeinde-reiskirchen.de

Reiskirchen (German pronunciation: [ʁaɪsˈkɪʁçn̩]) is a municipality in the district of Gießen, in Hesse, Germany and is located 11 km east of Gießen.
