= 1891 in Brazil =

Events in the year 1891 in Brazil.

== Incumbents ==
=== Federal government ===
- President: Marshal Deodoro da Fonseca (de facto until 26 February, de jure from 26 February to 23 November), Marshal Floriano Peixoto (starting 23 November)
- Vice-President: Marshal Floriano Peixoto (de jure from 26 February to 23 November), vacant from 23 November

=== Governors ===
- Alagoas:
  - until 12 June: Manuel de Araujo Gois
  - 12 June-16: Pedro Paulino de Fonseca
  - 16 June-23 November: Manuel de Araujo Gois
  - 23 November-28: Provisional Government
  - starting 28 November: Manuel Gomes Riberio
- Amazonas:
  - until 5 May: Eduardo Gonçalves Ribeiro
  - 5 May-25 May: Guilherme José Moreira
  - 25 May-30 June: Guilherme José Moreira
  - 30 June-1 September: Gregório Taumaturgo Azevedo
- Bahia: José Gonçalves da Silva then Tude Soares Neiva then Leal Ferreira
- Ceará:
  - until 22 January: Luís Antônio Ferraz
  - 22 January-6 April: Benjamin Liberato Barroso
  - 6 April-28 April: Feliciano Antônio Benjamim
  - starting 28 April: José Clarindo de Queirós
- Goiás:
  - until 20 January: Rodolfo Gustavo da Paixão
  - 20 January-30 March: Bernardo Albernaz
  - 30 March-20 May: João Bonifácio Gomes de Siqueira
  - 20 May-18 July: Constâncio Ribeiro da Maia
  - 18 July-7 December: Rodolfo Gustavo da Paixão
  - starting 7 December: Constâncio Ribeiro da Maia
- Maranhão:
- Mato Grosso: Antonio Maria Coelho then Frederico Solon de Sampaio Ribeiro then José da Silva Rondon then João Nepomuceno de Medeiros Mallet
- Minas Gerais:
  - until 11 February: Chrispim Jacques Bias Fortes
  - 11 February-17 March: Frederico Augusto Álvares da Silva
  - 17 March-16 June: Antônio Augusto de Lima
  - 16 June-18 June: Eduardo Ernesto da Gama Cerqueira
  - starting 18 June: Cesário Alvim
- Pará:
  - until 7 February: Justo Chermont
  - 7 February-25 March: Gentil Bittencourt
  - 25 March-24 June: Huet de Bacelar
  - starting 24 June: Lauro Sodré
- Paraíba: Venâncio Neiva (until 27 November), Government Junta (from 27 November)
- Paraná: José Cerqueira de Aguiar Lima then Generoso Marques dos Santos then Roberto Ferreira Bento/José Lamenha Lins/Joaquim Monteiro de Carvalho e Silva
- Pernambuco: José Antônio Correia da Silva (until 27 November); José Maria de Albuquerque Melo (from 27 November)
- Piauí:
  - until 28 May: Álvaro Moreira de Barros Oliveira Lima
  - 28 May-21 December: Gabriel Luís Ferreira
  - 21 December-29 December: Francisco Gomes Muniz
  - starting 29 December: Álvaro Lopes Machado
- Rio Grande do Norte:
  - until 2 March: Castro and Manuel do Nascimento Silva
  - 2 March-13 June: Amintas Francisco da Costa Barros
  - 13 June-6 August: José Inácio Fernandes Barros
  - 6 August-9 September: Francisco Gurgel de Oliveira
  - 9 September-28 November: Miguel Joaquim de Almeida Castro
  - starting 12 November: Government Junta
- Rio Grande do Sul:
  - until 16 March: Cândido José da Costa
  - 16 March-15 July: Fernando Fernandes Abbott
  - 15 July-12 November: Júlio de Castilhos
  - starting 12 November: Military Junta
- Santa Catarina:
  - until 10 November: Gustavo Richard
  - 10 November-28 December: Lauro Miller
  - starting 28 December: Government Junta
- São Paulo:
  - until 7 March: Jorge Tibiriçá Piratininga
  - 7 March-11 June: Américo Brasiliense
  - 11 June-15 December: Sérgio Tertuliano Castelo Branco
- Sergipe:
  - 26 January-27 May: Luis Mendes de Morais
  - 8 June-24 November: Vicente Ribeiro
  - starting 24 November: vacant thereafter

=== Vice governors ===
- Rio de Janeiro: Manuel Torres (until 10 May)
- Rio Grande do Norte:
  - until 11 June: Government Junta
  - 11 June-16 December: José Alves de Cerqueira César
  - starting 16 December: vacant
- São Paulo:
  - until 9 September: vacant
  - 9 September-28 November: Government Junta
  - starting 28 November: vacant

== Events ==
- 24 February – A new constitution is adopted by a Constitutional Congress.
- 26 February – Presidential election: De facto President Deodoro da Fonseca is confirmed in post, gaining 55.61% of the vote.
- 3 November – President Fonseca dissolves the National Congress and declares a "state of emergency".
- 23 November
  - President Fonseca resigns from office, handing the position to Floriano Peixoto.
  - Exiled Emperor Pedro II appears at the French Academy of Sciences for the last time to participate in an election.
- 3 December – A sudden deterioration is noted in the health of Pedro II.
- 9 December – Despite government repression, a popular gathering in memory of the deceased emperor occurred takes place, organized by the Marquis of Tamandaré, Viscount of Ouro Preto, Viscount of Sinimbu, Baron of Ladário, Carlos de Laet, Alfredo d' Escragnolle Taunay, Rodolfo Dantas, Afonso Celso and Joaquim Nabuco.
- date unknown – The daily newspaper Jornal do Brasil is founded.

== Arts and culture ==
=== Books ===
- Adolfo Caminha – A normalista

== Births ==
- 10 April – Zélio Fernandino de Moraes, founder of the Umbanda Branca religion (d. 1975)
- 21 July – Lasar Segall, Jewish painter, engraver and sculptor, died in Lithuania (d. 1957)
- 20 September – Maria José de Castro Rebello Mendes, diplomat (d. 1936)
- 23 October – Pedro Ludovico, founder of Goiânia (d. 1979)

== Deaths ==
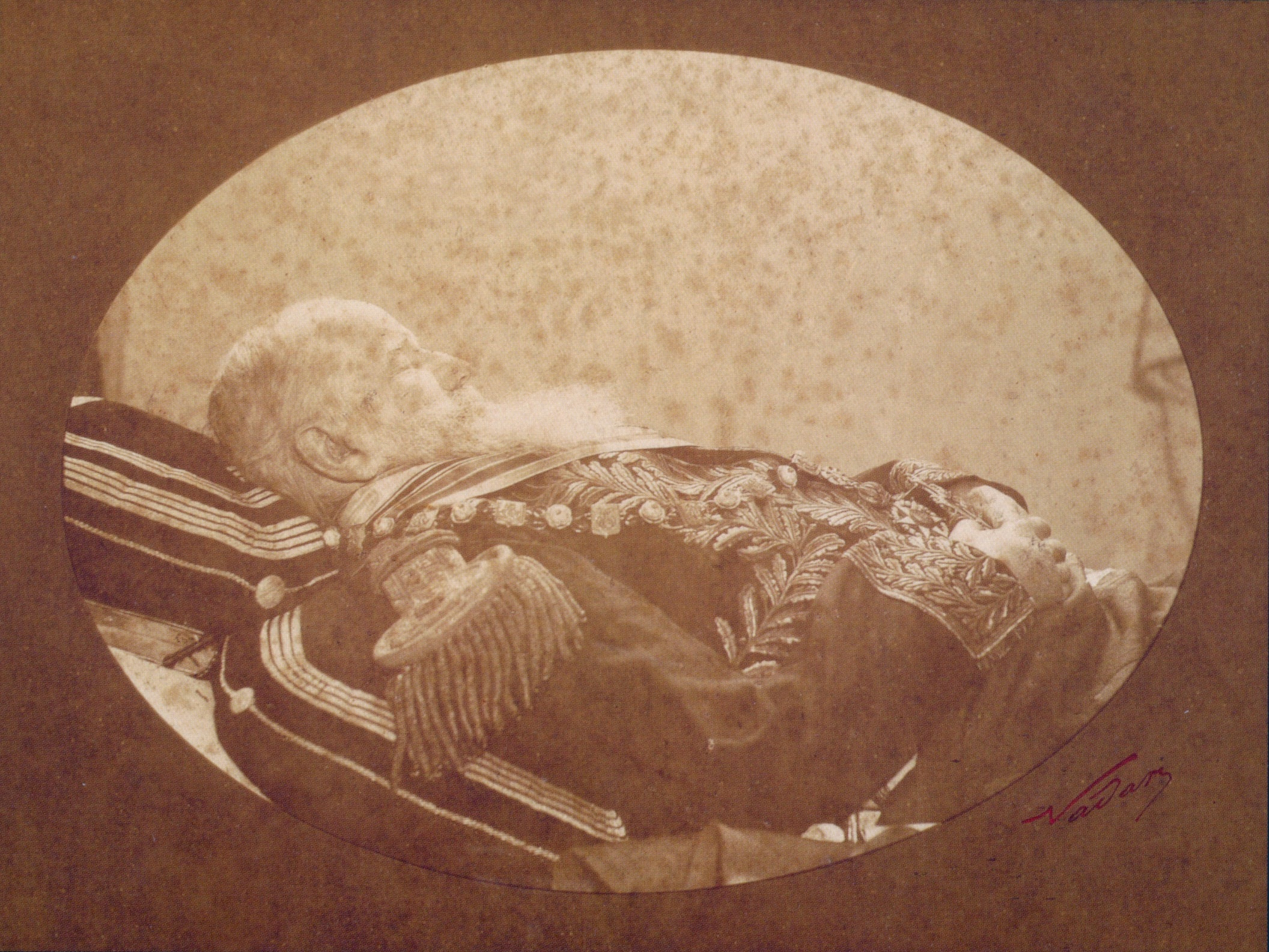
Pedro II in his deathbed, 6 December 1891

- 22 January – Benjamin Constant Botelho de Magalhães, soldier, and politician (b. 1836)
- 5 December – Pedro II of Brazil, exiled Emperor of Brazil (b. 1825)
