= João Pinheiro (disambiguation) =

João Pinheiro (1860–1908) was a Brazilian politician.

João Pinheiro may also refer to:

== Places ==
- João Pinheiro, Minas Gerais, Brazil

== People ==
- João Pinheiro Chagas (1863–1925), Portuguese journalist and politician.
- João Carlos Batista Pinheiro (1932–2011), Brazilian footballer.
- João de Deus Pinheiro (born 1945), Portuguese politician.
- João Pinheiro (referee) (born 1988), Portuguese football referee.

== Other ==
- João Pinheiro Foundation in Brazil.
