= Antonio Anastasia =

Brazilian lawyer and politician

His Excellency Antonio Anastasia

Justice of the Federal Court of Accounts
- Incumbent
- Assumed office 3 February 2022
- Nominated by: Federal Senate
- Appointed by: Jair Bolsonaro
- Preceded by: Raimundo Carreiro

Senator for Minas Gerais
- In office 1 February 2015 – 2 February 2022

First Vice President of the Senate
- In office 6 February 2019 – 2 February 2021
- President: Davi Alcolumbre
- Preceded by: Cássio Cunha Lima
- Succeeded by: Veneziano Vital do Rêgo

Governor of Minas Gerais
- In office 31 March 2010 – 4 April 2014
- Vice Governor: Alberto Pinto Coelho
- Preceded by: Aécio Neves
- Succeeded by: Alberto Pinto Coelho

Vice Governor of Minas Gerais
- In office 1 January 2007 – 31 March 2010
- Governor: Aécio Neves
- Preceded by: Clésio Andrade
- Succeeded by: Alberto Pinto Coelho

Minister of Labour and Federal Administration Acting
- In office 31 March 1998 – 6 April 1998
- President: Fernando Henrique Cardoso
- Preceded by: Paulo de Tarso
- Succeeded by: Edward Swaeden

Personal details
- Born: 9 May 1961 (age 65) Belo Horizonte, Minas Gerais, Brazil
- Party: PSD (2020–present)
- Other political affiliations: PSDB (2005–2020)
- Education: Federal University of Minas Gerais (LL.B.)

Antonio Augusto Junho Anastasia (born 9 May 1961) is a Brazilian lawyer and politician, affiliated with the Social Democratic Party. He graduated with a bachelor's and later a master's from the Federal University of Minas Gerais's Law School.

He started his career in academia, working as a Law professor in the Milton Campos Law School and in the João Pinheiro Foundation. In 1993, he was approved in a competitive examination from his alma mater, UFMG, and was invested as a tenured Administrative Law professor. However, since 1988, Anastasia was involved with politics serving as an advisor to state deputy Bonifácio Mourão during the period the State Legislative Assembly worked as a Constitutional Assembly, after the end of Brazil's 20-year old Military Dictatorship.

During the administration of governor Hélio Garcia (1991-1994) he occupied several administrative posts, such as deputy-secretary of Planning and General Coordination, secretary of Culture, secretary of Human Resources and Management, and president of the João Pinheiro Foundation. From 1995 to 1998, he served as the deputy-minister of Labor in the administration of president Fernando Henrique Cardoso.

He was invited by then governor Aécio Neves to replace Clésio Andrade as his running mate for the 2006 election. Therefore, Anastasia served as vice governor of Minas Gerais from 2007 to 2010. In March 2010, Neves resigned to run for the Senate and Anastasia assumed the office of governor, serving the remainder of his predecessor's term. From 2011, Anastasia served as the elected governor of the state of Minas Gerais, a post he kept up to March 2014, when following his predecessor's example he resigned to run for the Senate.

After an unsuccessful campaign to be elected governor again in 2018, Anastasia kept his seat in the Senate. In 2019, he was picked by his peers to be the first vice president of the Senate for the biennium 2019-2020.

Anastasia announced he would disaffiliate with the PSDB and join the similarly named PSD in an effort to distance himself from his patron and former running mate Aécio Neves, involved in corruption scandals. That move would disqualify him were he a federal deputy, but as elections for the Senate are not proportional to the share of votes received by each party he was allowed to keep his seat.

On 30 November 2021, Justice Raimundo Carreiro's appointment as Brazil's new ambassador to Portugal was approved by the Senate, leaving a life-tenured vacancy at the Federal Court of Accounts (TCU) to be filled by the nomination of the Senate. Anastasia, supported by the President of the Senate Rodrigo Pacheco and his party PSD, presented his candidacy to substitute the retired justice at the TCU. Senators Kátia Abreu and Fernando Bezerra Coelho also presented their candidacies. The first vote in the upper house gave Anastasia a comfortable win, with 52 out of 81 votes going for him. Abreu received 19 votes and Bezerra only seven. The confirmation vote in the Chamber of Deputies was won easily with 322 votes supporting Anastasia's nomination, with only 18 votes against and 8 abstentions. Anastasia's appointment to TCU by president Jair Bolsonaro was published in Brazil's official gazette on 1 February 2022, simultaneously to the retirement of Anastasia's predecessor Raimundo Carreiro. Anastasia took office two days later.

Political offices
Preceded by Paulo de Tarso	Minister of Labour and Federal Administration; Acting; 1998	Succeeded by Edward Swaelen
Preceded by Clésio Andrade	Vice Governor of Minas Gerais; 2007–2010	Succeeded by Alberto Pinto Coelho
Preceded by Aécio Neves	Governor of Minas Gerais; 2010–2014	Succeeded by Alberto Pinto Coelho
Preceded by Raimundo Carreiro	Justice of the Federal Court of Accounts; 2022–present	Incumbent
