= 1936 in Brazil =

Events in the year 1936 in Brazil.

== Incumbents ==
=== Federal government ===
- President: Getúlio Vargas

=== Governors ===
- Alagoas: Osman Laurel
- Amazonas: Álvaro Botelho Maia
- Bahia: Juracy Magalhães
- Ceará: Francisco de Meneses Pimentel
- Espírito Santo: João Punaro Bley
- Goiás: Pedro Ludovico Teixeira
- Maranhão:
- Mato Grosso: Mário Correia da Costa
- Minas Gerais: Benedito Valadares Ribeiro
- Pará: José Carneiro da Gama Malcher
- Paraíba: Argemiro de Figueiredo
- Paraná: Manuel Ribas
- Pernambuco: Carlos de Lima Cavalcanti
- Piauí: Leônidas Melo
- Rio Grande do Norte: Rafael Fernandes Gurjão
- Rio Grande do Sul: José Antônio Flores da Cunha
- Santa Catarina: Nereu Ramos
- São Paulo: Armando de Sales Oliveira (till 29 December); Henrique Smith Baima (from 29 December)
- Sergipe: Erônides de Carvalho

=== Vice governors ===
- Rio Grande do Norte: no vice governor
- São Paulo: no vice governor

== Events ==
- 15 January – Farroupilha Revolution centennial fair closes.
- 16 April – Pedro Calmon is elected to the Academia Brasileira de Letras.
- 16 October – President Vargas signed the decree, which gives the name of the aviator Alberto Santos Dumont Airport located in Ponta do Calabouço, in the city of Rio de Janeiro, currently named Santos Dumont Airport, Brazil's first civilian airport.

== Arts and culture ==
=== Films ===
- Noites Cariocas, directed and written by Enrique Cadícamo and featuring Grande Otelo.

== Births ==
=== January ===
- 13 January – Renato Aragão ("Didi"), actor and comedian
- 19 January – Carlos Mário da Silva Velloso, president of the Supreme Federal Tribunal 1999–2001.
- 28 January – Waldyr Boccardo, basketball player (died 2018)

=== March ===
- 13 March – Carlos Alberto de Nóbrega, actor, comedian and humorist.
- 12 March – José Mojica Marins ("Coffin Joe"), filmmaker, actor, composer, screenwriter, and television horror host (died 2020)
- 26 March – Éder Jofre, architect and boxer (died 2022)

=== April ===
- 24 April – Esther Pillar Grossi, educator and politician

=== May ===
- 23 May – Wadih Mutran, politician

=== June ===
- 22 June – Hermeto Pascoal, composer and multi-instrumentalist (died 2025)

=== August ===
- 4 August
  - Joaquim Roriz, politician (died 2018)
  - Alfredo Bosi, historian and literary critic (died 2021)

=== September ===
- September 16 – Yara Amaral, actress (died 1988)

=== October ===
- October 16 – Agnaldo Timoteo, singer and politician (died 2021)
- October 22 – Rolando Boldrin, actor, singer, songwriter, and presenter (died 2022)

== Deaths ==
- 11 April – Aarão Reis, engineer (born 1853)
- 29 October – Maria José de Castro Rebello Mendes, diplomat (b. 1891)
- date unknown
  - pt:Geminiano Lira Castro, politician (born 1863)

== See also ==
- 1936 in Brazilian football
- List of Brazilian films of 1936
