= Chrispim Jacques Bias Fortes =

Brazilian politician and prosecutor

Bias Fortes
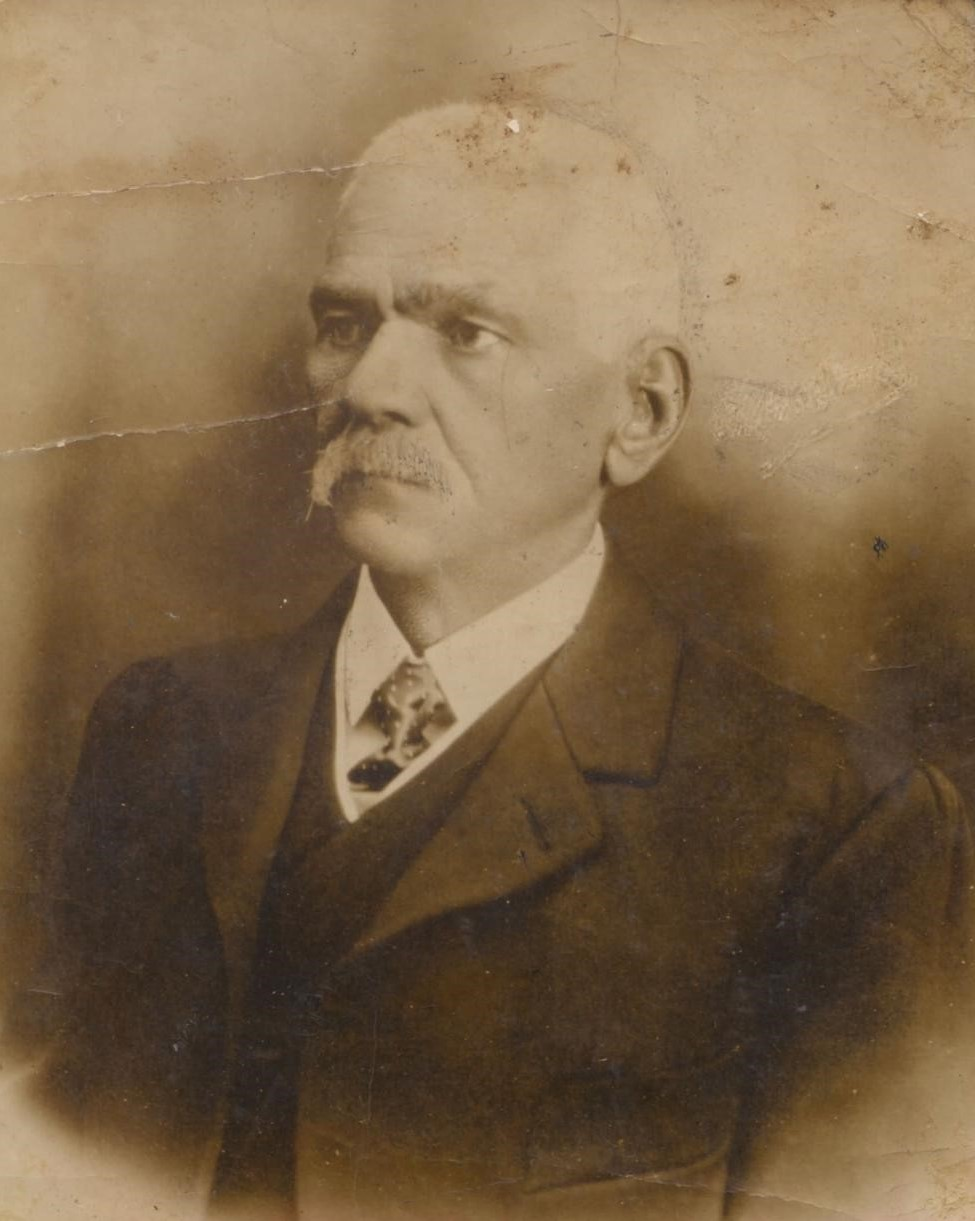

President of Minas Gerais
- In office 7 September 1894 – 7 September 1898
- Preceded by: Afonso Pena
- Succeeded by: Silviano Brandão
- In office 24 July 1890 – 11 February 1891
- Preceded by: Domingos José da Rocha
- Succeeded by: Frederico Álvares da Silva

Personal details
- Born: 25 October 1847 Livramento, Minas Gerais, Empire of Brazil
- Died: 14 March 1917 (aged 69) Barbacena, Minas Gerais, Brazil
- Party: Liberal; PRM
- Spouse: Adelaide de Araújo Fortes
- Children: 3, including José Francisco
- Education: Faculty of Law of São Paulo (LL.B)

Chrispim Jacques Bias Fortes (25 October 1847 – 14 March 1917), often referred to as Bias Fortes, was a Brazilian politician and prosecutor who served as president of Minas Gerais in the early years of the First Brazilian Republic. During his administration the new state capital, Belo Horizonte, was inaugurated in 1897, replacing Ouro Preto.

== Early life and education ==
The son of Francisco José de Oliveira Fortes, a captain in Brazil's National Guard, and Carlota Benedita de Oliveira Fortes, Bias Fortes was born on 25 October 1847 in the Livramento (currently the municipality of Olivera Fortes), Minas Gerais. His name is a homage to Saint Crispin, Jean-Jacques Rousseau, and Greek philosopher Bias of Priene.

Bias Fortes completed his first studies in Barbacena and later moved to São Paulo to study at the Faculty of Law, where he graduated in Legal and Social Sciences in 1870, alongside Joaquim Nabuco, Ruy Barbosa, Afonso Pena and Rodrigues Alves. After finishing his studies at the Faculty of Law, Bias Fortes returned to Minas Gerais, where he began to work as an attorney in Barbacena. In October 1871, he was appointed public prosecutor in the district of Parahybuna and later became a municipal judge in Barbacena.

Bias Fortes married Adelaide de Araújo, who was the daughter of major João Manoel de Araújo, an important figure in the Liberal rebellions of 1842. Together they had 3 children: José Francisco, who would later become governor of Minas Gerais, Maria Alice, and Laurita.

== Political career ==
=== Provincial deputy ===
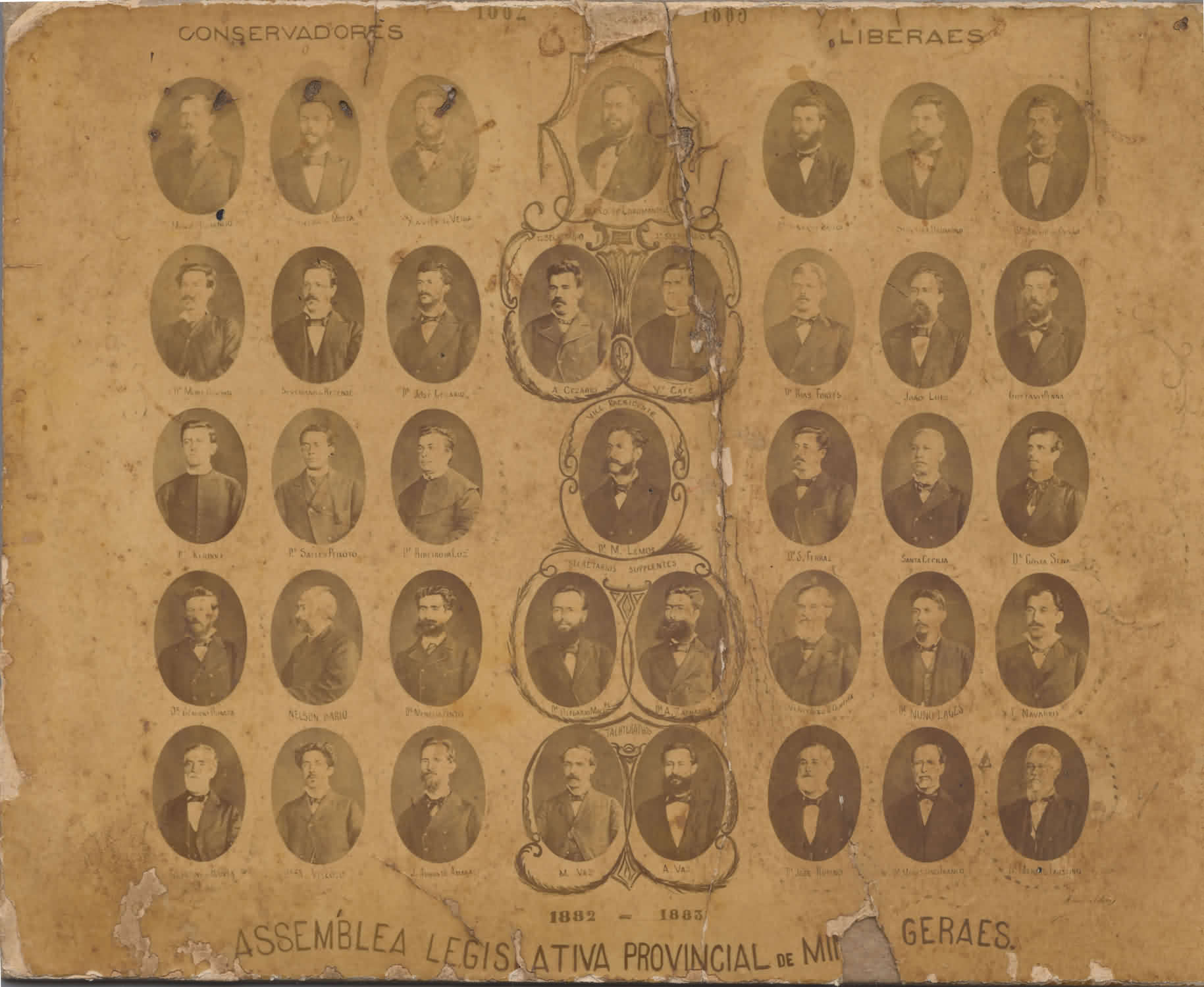
Members of the 24th legislature (1882–1883). Bias Fortes is on the second row, sixth column

In 1879, Bias Fortes requested his dismissal from his office as magistrate and began his political career, joining the Liberal Party. In 1881, he was elected provincial deputy of Minas Gerais for the remainder of the 23rd legislature (1880–1881), being successively reelected until the 27th legislature (1888–1889). During this period, he occupied the position of president of the Provincial Assembly several times, distinguishing himself in the defense of Minas Gerais' interests and the moralization of public administration.

Amidst the growing republican movement in the Brazilian Empire in the 1880s, Bias Fortes declared himself a republican and resigned his position as provincial deputy in 1888, before the end of the 27th legislature. The next year he once again ran for the position. However, despite receiving a considerable number of votes, he was prevented from taking office due to the coup d'état that proclaimed the republic in Brazil. At that time, Bias Fortes had already joined the Republican Party of Minas Gerais (PRM), founded in 1888.

=== President of Minas Gerais ===
With the republic in place, Bias Fortes was invited by state president João Pinheiro to create the draft for the state's constitution. Shortly after, he was appointed provisional president (governor) of Minas Gerais by president Deodoro da Fonseca, serving consecutively from 24 July to 5 August 1890, 14 August to 3 October 1890, 18 October to 27 December 1890, and 7 January to 11 February 1891, being succeeded by Frederico Augusto Álvares da Silva.

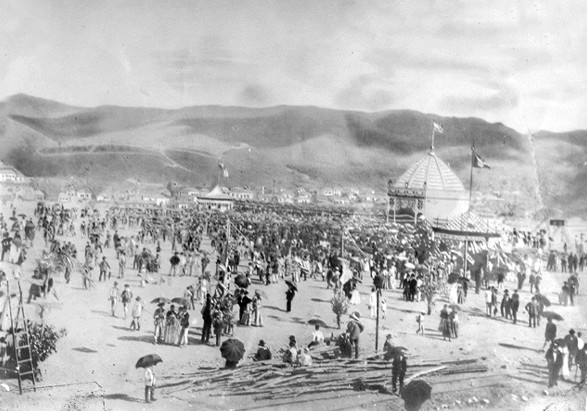
The inauguration of Belo Horizonte in 1897

Bias Fortes was elected to the Minas Gerais Constituent Assembly on 25 January 1891, directly acting in the creation of the state constitution. He also served as president of the State Senate from 1891 to 1893. In 1894, Bias Fortes resigned his position in the Senate after being elected president of Minas Gerais on 7 March and taking office on 7 September, succeeding Afonso Pena. As president of Minas Gerais, Bias Fortes sought to promote agriculture, immigration, and the settlement of interior lands. He also reformed agricultural and veterinary teaching and invested in railway construction. On 12 December 1897, Bias Fortes inaugurated the new state capital, Belo Horizonte, replacing Ouro Preto.

=== Final years and death ===
Bias Fortes was succeeded by Silviano Brandão on 7 September 1898. That year he assumed the presidency of the PRM's executive committee, known as Tarasca, a position he held until 1917.

Bias Fortes died in Barbacena on 14 March 1917 during his office as state senator.

== Homages ==
Bias Fortes lends his name to several avenues and squares in Belo Horizonte and Barbacena. In Belo Horizonte's Liberdade Square there is a monument in his honor. Likewise, in the city's Municipal Park there is a monument to the "founders of Belo Horizonte", which includes Bias Fortes, alongside Augusto de Lima, Afonso Pena and Aarão Reis.

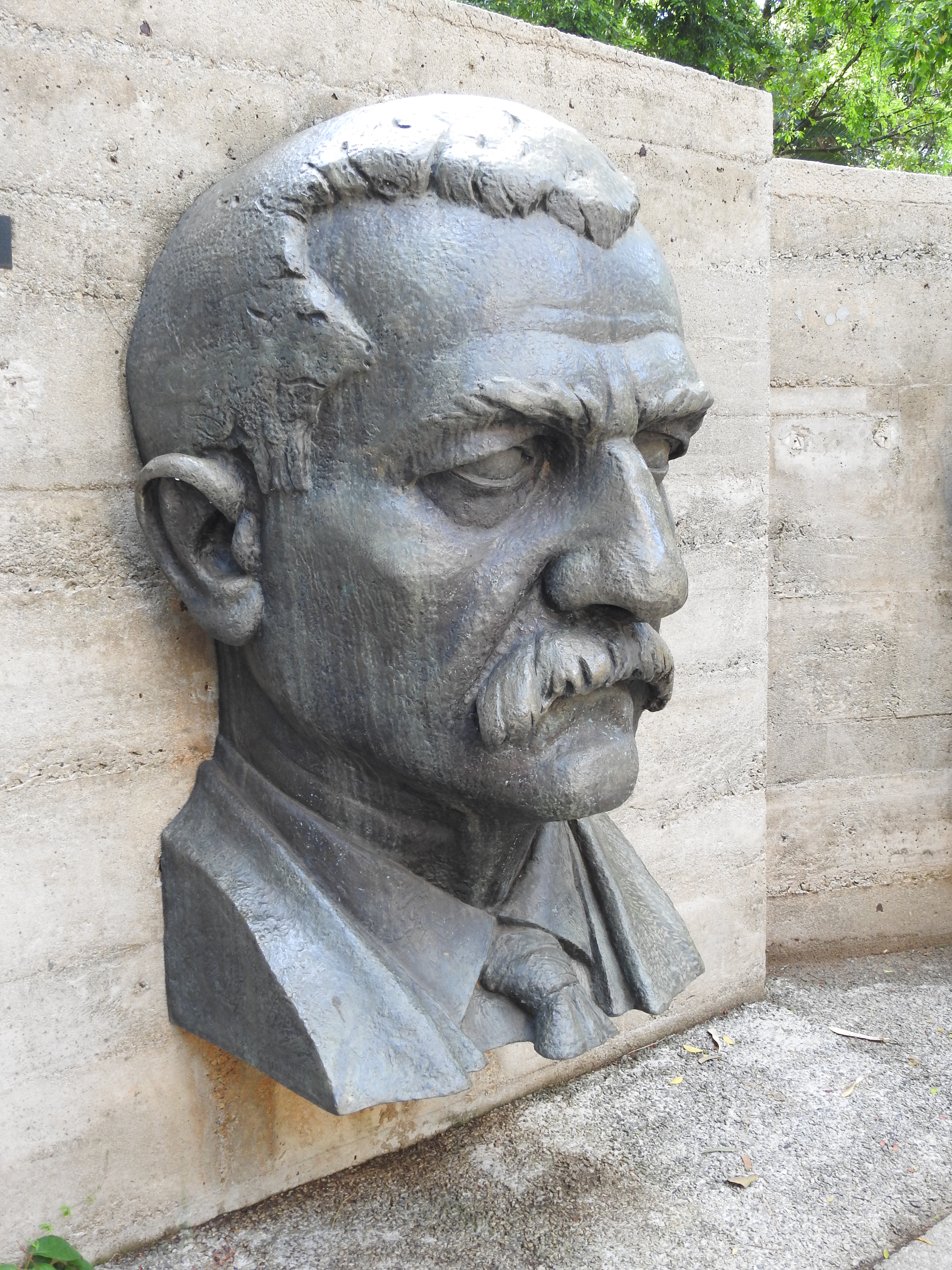
Monument to Bias Fortes in the Municipal Park of Belo Horizonte

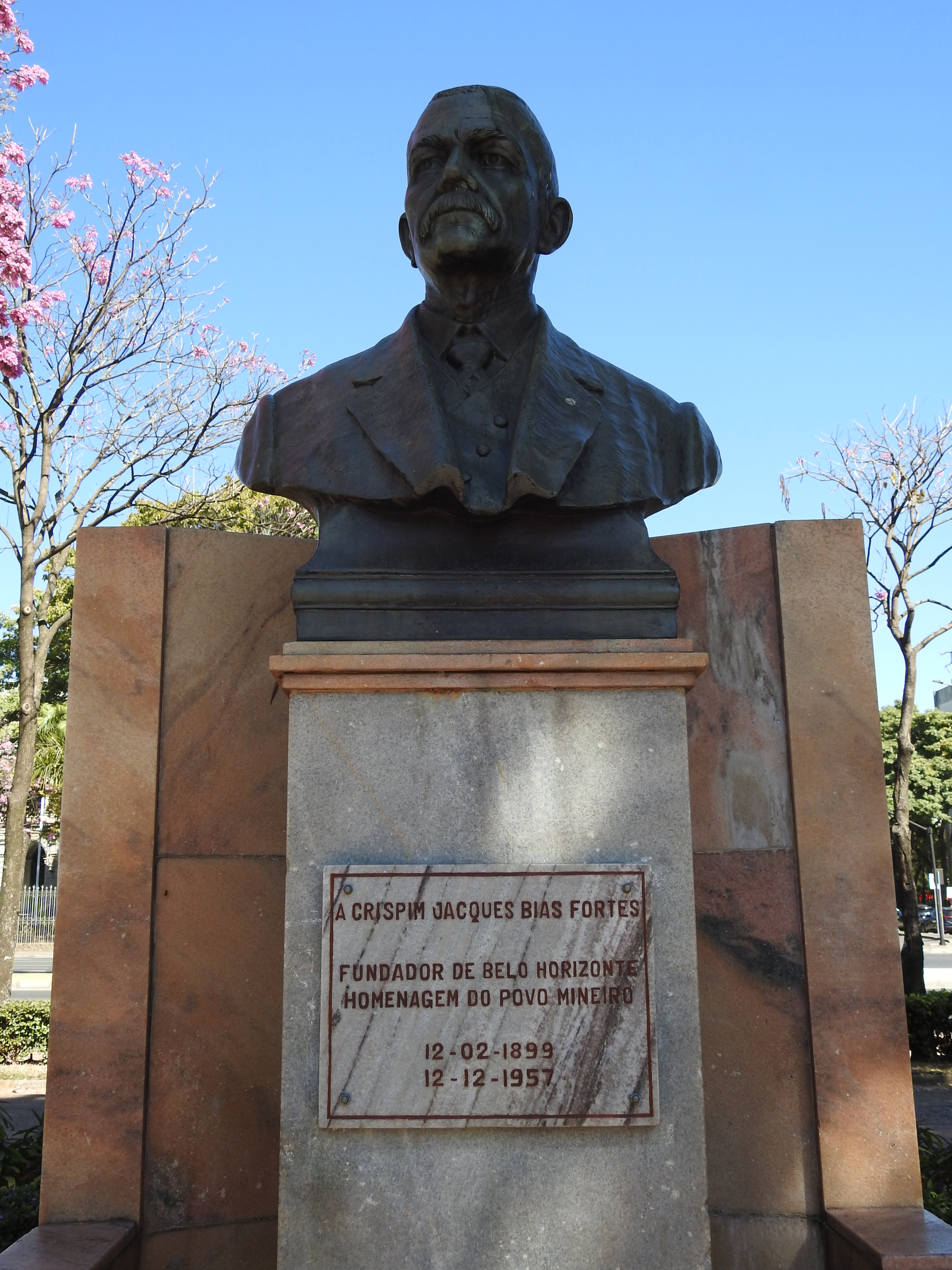
A bust of Bias Fortes in Liberdade Square, Belo Horizonte
