= Alberto Coelho =

Alberto Coelho may refer to:

- Betinho (footballer, born 1993) (Alberto Alves Coelho), Portuguese footballer
- Alberto Coelho (boxer), Angolan boxer
- Alberto Pinto Coelho Júnior, Brazilian administrator and politician
