= Magalhães Pinto =

Brazilian politician and banker

- José de Magalhães Pinto in 1968.

Governor of Minas Gerais
- In office 31 January 1961 – 31 January 1966
- Preceded by: José Francisco Bias Fortes
- Succeeded by: Israel Pinheiro da Silva

President of the Senate
- In office 15 March 1975 – 15 March 1977
- Preceded by: Paulo Francisco Torres
- Succeeded by: Petrônio Portela Nunes

Minister of Foreign Affairs
- In office 15 March 1967 – 30 October 1969
- President: Artur da Costa e Silva; 1969 military junta
- Preceded by: Juracy Magalhães
- Succeeded by: Mário Gibson Barbosa

Senator from Minas Gerais
- In office 1 February 1971 – 31 January 1979

Federal deputy from Minas Gerais
- In office 1 February 1979 – 31 January 1987
- In office 1 February 1967 – 31 January 1971
- In office 5 February 1946 – 31 January 1961

Personal details
- Born: José de Magalhães Pinto; 28 June 1909 Santo Antônio do Monte, Brazil
- Died: 6 March 1996 (aged 86) Rio de Janeiro, Brazil
- Party: UDN, ARENA, PP, PDS
- Spouse: Berenice Catão de Magalhães Pinto
- Occupation: Politician, banker

José de Magalhães Pinto (28 June 1909 – 6 March 1996) was a Brazilian politician and banker.

Magalhães Pinto was born in Santo Antônio do Monte, in the state of Minas Gerais. He was the governor of this state from 1961 to 1966. While governor, Magalhães Pinto became the leading civilian in the opposition movement. In 1964, Magalhães Pinto and Field Marshal Humberto de Alencar Castelo Branco, the chief of staff of the army, "emerged as the chief coordinators of the conspiracy" to depose President João Goulart by the Brazilian military. This conspiracy proved successful, and ushered in "two decades of strict military rule."

After leaving the governorship, he became the Minister of Foreign Affairs in the military government. He later left the government to run for and serve in the Senate, and served as the President of the Senate from 1975 to 1977.

His name officially christens the Mineirão stadium, which hosted six matches of the 2014 FIFA World Cup, including the Mineiraço/Mineirazo.

== See also ==
- List of governors of Minas Gerais
- 1964 Brazilian coup d'état
