= Rondon Pacheco =

Brazilian politician (1919–2016)

- Pacheco in 1969

Governor of Minas Gerais
- In office 15 March 1971 – 15 March 1975
- Preceded by: Israel Pinheiro da Silva
- Succeeded by: Aureliano Chaves

Chief of Staff of the Presidency of Brazil
- In office 15 March 1967 – 30 October 1969
- President: Artur da Costa e Silva
- Preceded by: Luís Augusto Fraga Navarro de Brito
- Succeeded by: João Leitão de Abreu

Personal details
- Born: 31 July 1919 Uberlândia, Minas Gerais, Brazil
- Died: 4 July 2016 (aged 96) Uberlândia, Minas Gerais, Brazil
- Party: UDN; ARENA; PDS; PSDB
- Spouse: Marina de Freitas Pacheco
- Profession: Politician

Rondon Pacheco (31 July 1919 – 4 July 2016) was a Brazilian politician. He served as Chief of Staff of Brazil to President Artur da Costa e Silva, from 1967 to 1969 during the Brazilian military government. In 1971, Pacheco was appointed Governor of his home state of Minas Gerais by President Emílio Garrastazu Médici. He held the office of Governor from 1971 until 1975.

== Biography ==
Pacheco was born in Uberlândia, Minas Gerais, on 31 July 1919. He studied law at the Federal University of Minas Gerais (UFMG). He credited a class speech he delivered at UFMG in 1943 with sparking his interest in politics.

=== Political career ===
In 1947, Pacheco was elected to the state Legislative Assembly of Minas Gerais as a member of the National Democratic Union (UDN). Three years later, in 1950, he was elected to the federal Chamber of Deputies in Rio de Janeiro, which was still the national capital at the time.

President Artur da Costa e Silva, the leader of the Brazilian military government, appointed Pacheco as his Chief of Staff from March 1967 until October 1969. The Chief of Staff is a senior aide to the Brazilian president and a member of the Cabinet of Brazil.

President Emílio Garrastazu Médici appointed Pacheco as the Governor of Minas Gerais from 1971 until 1975. In 1973, the state government under Governor Pacheco signed an agreement with Fiat Automobiles to open an automotive plant in the city of Betim, near Belo Horizonte. The Fiat plant opened in 1976.

Pacheco joined the Democratic Social Party (PDS) in 1976. He endorsed the candidacy of PMDB presidential candidate, Tancredo Neves, in the 1985 election. Pacheco left politics in 1986 after an unsuccessful bid for a seat in the Federal Senate.

A biographical documentary film on Pacheco's life, Algodão entre Espelhos, was released in 2012.

Pacheco had been hospitalized for pneumonia at a hospital in Rio de Janeiro from 9 June until 12 June 2016. He was then transferred to a hospital in his hometown of Uberlândia from 12 June until he was discharged from that facility on 29 June 2016. Rondon Pacheco died in Uberlândia, Minas Gerais on 4 July 2016, at the age of 96. He was survived by his wife, Marina de Freitas Pacheco, and two daughters, Vera and Maria Vitória. Their son died in an accident during the late 1960s.

Rondon Pacheco's funeral was held at the Palácio dos Leões (Palace of the Lions) in Uberlândia, with burial in the cemitério São Pedro.

Pacheco was the second former Governor of Minas Gerais to die in less than two months, following the death of Hélio Garcia on 6 June 2016.
