= Antônio Olinto dos Santos Pires =

Brazilian politician

Antônio Olinto
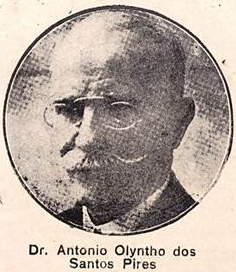

President of Minas Gerais
- In office 17 November 1889 – 24 November 1889
- Preceded by: Viscount of Ibituruna
- Succeeded by: Cesário Alvim

Personal details
- Born: 15 December 1860 Serro, Brazil
- Died: 25 February 1925 (aged 64) Belo Horizonte, Brazil

Antônio Olinto dos Santos Pires (15 December 1860 – 25 February 1925) was the first president of the state of Minas Gerais in Brazil.

== Political career ==
He founded the Minas Republican Party with João Pinheir.

He served as president of Minas Gerais from 17 November 1889 to 24 November 1889, was then a member of the government from 1890 to 1893 and minister of transportation from 1894 to 1896.

== Writing ==
He directed the Estado de Minas and the Movement newspapers and collaborated on a Historical and Geographical Dictionary of Brazil/
