= Cesário Alvim =

Brazilian lawyer, journalist and politician (1839–1903)

Mayor of the Federal District
- In office 31 December 1898 – 23 May 1899
- Preceded by: Luís van Erven
- Succeeded by: Honório Gurgel

President of Minas Gerais
- In office 15 June 1891 – 17 February 1892
- Preceded by: Augusto de Lima
- Succeeded by: Gama Cerqueira
- In office 25 November 1889 – 10 February 1890
- Preceded by: Antônio Olinto
- Succeeded by: João Pinheiro

Personal details
- Born: 7 June 1839 Piranga, Minas Gerais, Brazil
- Died: 3 December 1903 (aged 64) Rio de Janeiro, Brazil

José Cesário de Faria Alvim (7 June 1839 – 3 December 1903) was a Brazilian lawyer, journalist, landowner, and politician who became a prominent figure in the final decades of the Empire of Brazil and the early years of the First Brazilian Republic. Alvim served as president of the Province of Rio de Janeiro, president of Minas Gerais, Minister of the Interior, senator, and Mayor of the Federal District (Rio de Janeiro), being known for his oratory skills, his defense of abolitionist and republican ideals, and his efforts to modernize and consolidate republican institutions in Minas Gerais.

== Early life and education ==
The son of colonel José Cesário de Faria Alvim and Teresa Januária Carneiro, Cesário Alvim was born in Arraial do Pinheiro, then part of the municipality of Mariana (now Pinheiros Altos, a district of Piranga), in the province of Minas Gerais on 7 June 1839.

His parents were both from influential local families connected to the early settlement and economic development of the Ubá region. The Alvim family owned extensive lands, notably the Liberdade farm, where they cultivated coffee and other crops with slave labor and where Cesário spent his youth.

Alvim's father died in 1858, leaving his widow to raise the children and finance their studies. Teresa Januária sold and mortgaged family assets to send José Cesário and his brother Antônio to study law in São Paulo. As a student, he wrote for newspapers such as O Timbira and O Futuro, where he gained recognition for his political articles and poetry, including the piece A Democracia. Alvim graduated in legal and social sciences from the Law School of São Paulo in 1862.

After returning to Minas Gerais, Alvim practiced law in Ubá, where his first case was the defense of his mother in a lawsuit concerning debts incurred to finance his education, though unsuccessful.

=== Marriage and family ===
Alvim married Amélia Calado de Miranda Alvim. His descendants include figures who would later become notable in Brazilian politics, including his grandsons Virgílio Alvim de Melo Franco and Afonso Arinos de Melo Franco, and his great-grandsons Francisco Manuel de Melo Franco and Afonso Arinos de Melo Franco Filho.

== Political career ==
In 1864, at the age of 25, Alvim was elected to the Provincial Assembly of Minas Gerais, being re-elected in 1866. By 1867, he had moved to national politics, serving as deputy in Brazil's General Assembly. During this period, Alvim founded the newspaper A Reforma, becoming known as a fiery liberal orator, and strongly opposing slavery. He was re-elected several times, serving in the Chamber until 1880.

In 1884, Alvim was appointed President of the Province of Rio de Janeiro by prime minister Manuel Pinto de Sousa Dantas, whose government was committed to advancing the abolitionist cause. During his tenure, which lasted until 1886, Alvim proposed reforms aimed at curbing slavery and modernizing the provincial administration. His 1885 provincial report, which condemned slavery, gained national attention.

=== President of Minas Gerais ===
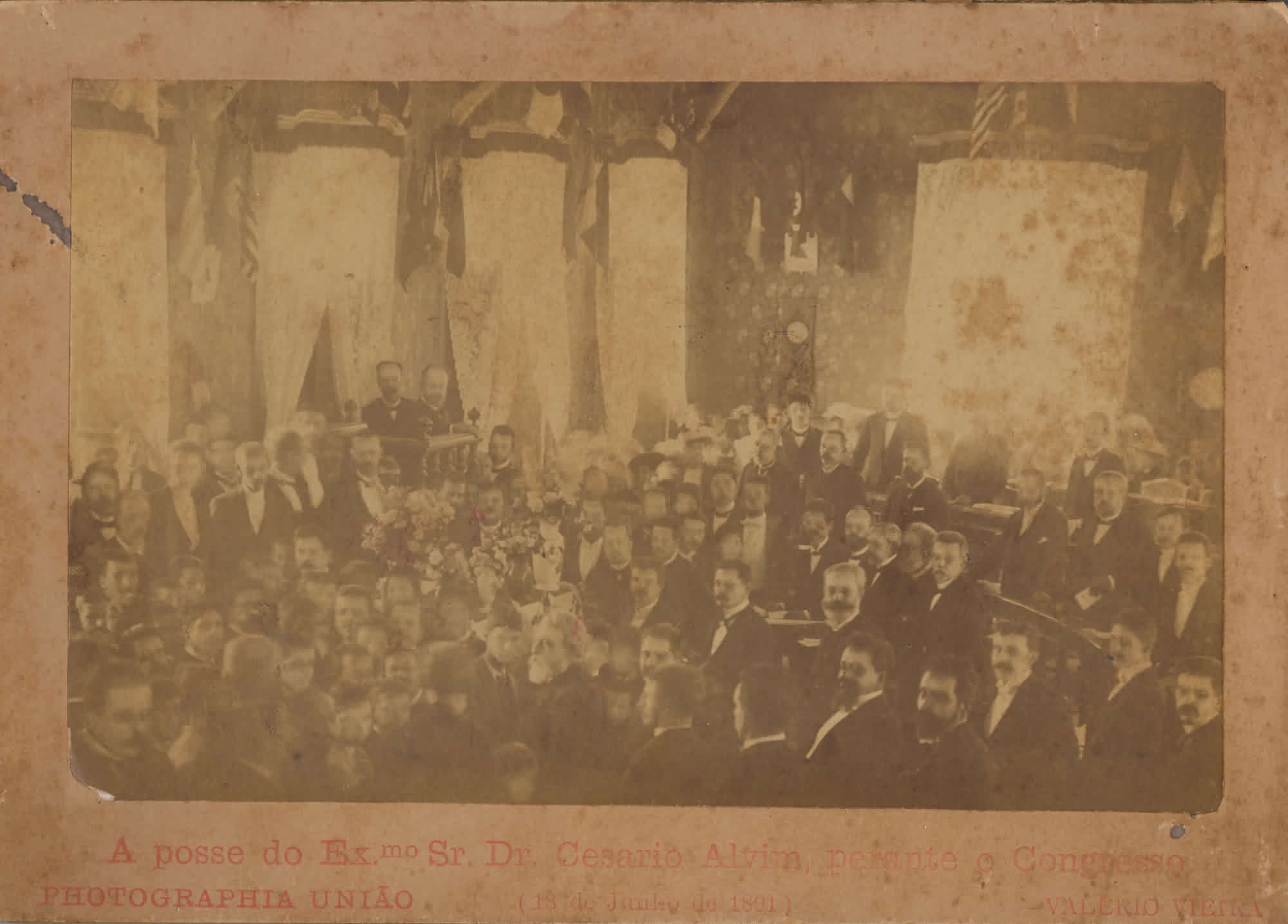
Cesário Alvim's inauguration as governor of Minas Gerais in Ouro Preto on 18 June 1891 Césario Alvim, probably in the 1890s

After the proclamation of the Republic in 1889, President Deodoro da Fonseca appointed Alvim as the first republican president (governor) of Minas Gerais. Fonseca ordered Antônio Felício dos Santos to inaugurate Alvim, who was not found. Santos then named Antônio Olinto for the office, who occupied the position from 17 to 24 November 1889, until Alvim was found.

Alvim took office on 25 November 1889, advocating political conciliation and non-retaliation toward monarchists. In February 1890, he became Minister of the Interior and was elected as a senator for the Constituent Assembly.

On 15 June 1891, Alvim became the first constitutional president of Minas Gerais. His administration worked to stabilize public finances, increase tax revenue, and reduce state debt. He promoted administrative modernization, improving rail transport, public credit, and primary education, as well as enacting new municipal and judicial organization laws.

Alvim faced strong opposition from the so-called "historic republicans", who criticized his conversion to republicanism at the last moment and sought greater political influence. The situation was exacerbated by a separatist movement in southern Minas Gerais aiming to create a new state, Minas do Sul, with its capital in Campanha. To prevent further instability and preserve state unity, Alvim resigned on 17 February 1892, being succeeded by Eduardo Ernesto da Gama Cerqueira, and later by Afonso Pena.

== Death ==
Alvim died in Rio de Janeiro on 3 December 1903.
