= 1825 in Brazil =

This is a list of events that occurred during the year 1825 in Brazil.

== Incumbents ==
- Monarch: Pedro I

== Events ==
=== August ===
- August 29 – The Treaty of Rio de Janeiro between the Kingdom of Portugal and the Empire of Brazil, recognizes Brazil as an independent nation; formally ending Brazil’s war of independence.

=== October ===
- October 12 – The Battle of Sarandí between troops of the Banda Oriental and the Empire of Brazil.

== Births ==
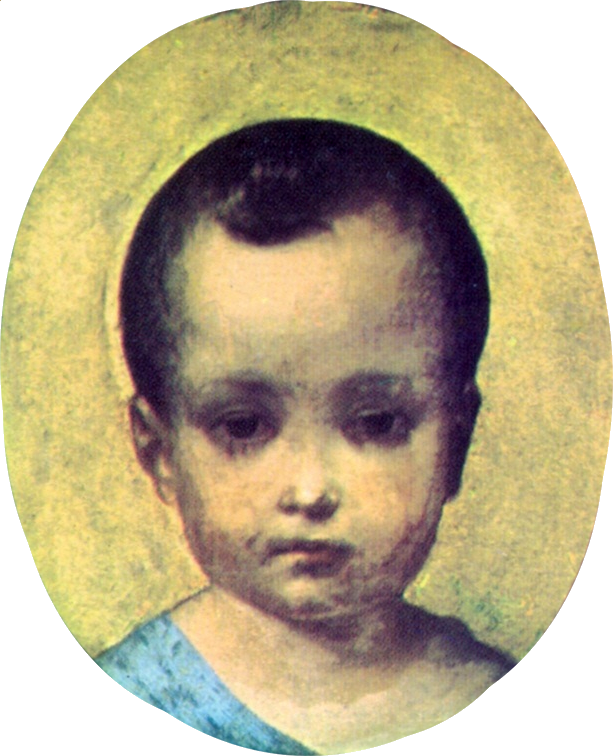
Pedro II of Brazil.

- 26 June – Francisco Otaviano, poet and politician (died 1889)
- 2 December – Pedro II of Brazil, Emperor of Brazil from 1831 to 1889 (died 1891).

== Deaths ==
- 13 January: Frei Caneca, religious leader
