= Miguel Joaquim de Almeida Castro =

Brazilian politician (1834–1901)

- Born: December 4, 1834; Ipueiras, Ceará
- Died: May 6, 1901 (aged 66); Recife
- Occupation: Politician

Constitution of Brazil of 1891, page with the signature of Miguel Joaquim de Almeida Castro (the twenty-second signature). Collection of the National Archives

Miguel Joaquim de Almeida Castro (December 4, 1834, Ipueiras, Brazil – May 6, 1901, Recife, Brazil), also known as Miguel Castro, was a Brazilian politician. He served as the president of the province of Piauí from May 1, 1882, to April 5, 1883.

== Biography ==
He was born on the Convento farm, in the then parish of São Gonçalo da Serra dos Cocos (now a district of the municipality of Ipueiras, Ceará), son of Joaquim Felício de Almeida and Castro, a native of Rio Grande do Norte, and Cosma Rodrigues Veras. Through his father, he was a grandnephew of Padre Miguelinho, a participant in the Pernambucan Revolt of 1817, from whom he inherited his name.

At just eight months old, he moved with his family to Rio Grande do Norte, settling on the Olho d'Água dos Pinhos farm, now in the municipality of Triunfo Potiguar. There, he learned his first letters. In 1848, he went to the city of Imperatriz (Martins, Rio Grande do Norte) in the same province, where he studied Latin until 1851, when he then moved to Olinda to continue his studies and enroll in the Faculty of Law.

He graduated with a degree in law in 1858, in the same class as Tomás Antônio de Paula Pessoa, Ladislau Acrísio de Almeida Fortuna, and Cordolino Barbosa Cordeiro. However, in the fifth year of his course, he was elected provincial deputy for Rio Grande do Norte for the biennium of 1858–1859, after which he was re-elected. He was appointed public prosecutor of the Maioridade district (Martins), by order of March 9, 1859, from Dr. Antônio Marcelino Nunes Gonçalves (later Viscount of São Luís), then president of the province, and by orders of January 6 and August 17 of the same year, public instruction delegate of the said city, and visiting agent of the Literary Circle of Maioridade and Mossoró.

By imperial decree of April 10, 1860, he was appointed municipal judge and orphans' judge of the term of Aracati, in Ceará, and police delegate and effective inspector of the classes of the same term, by orders of 5 and 23 of the same month of the year. By imperial decree of August 20, 1864, he was appointed judge of law of the district of Saboeiro, from which he was transferred at his request to that of Teixeira, in Paraíba, by decree of January 27, 1868. As he did not assume the position of the latter, he was declared surplus and ceased to be part of the active judiciary. However, he continued in public service, appointed, by order of March 16 of the same year, literary inspector of the Saboeiro district.

By imperial letters of May 18, 1878, and February 25, 1882, he was appointed fifth vice-president of Ceará and president of the province of Piauí, where he stayed for about a year. On May 23, 1883, he was honored with the commendation of the Imperial Order of the Rose.

He was elected general deputy, in 1885, for the fifth district of Ceará, as an abolitionist, and, in 1889, for the second district of Rio Grande do Norte. Joining the republican regime, he enlisted in the party led by Pedro Velho and was elected deputy to the Republican Constituent, in 1890.

He was the first governor elected by Rio Grande do Norte, in 1891. Having taken office on September 9, he was deposed by the federal public force on November 28, arrested, and taken to the 34th Battalion Barracks. Restored to power with the rise of Floriano Peixoto, he was deposed, retiring to Ceará and, later, to Recife, where he died. He served as a federal deputy until 1893, when he completely withdrew from politics.

Miguel Castro died at the age of 66, from malaria, at the home of his son-in-law, José Otávio de Freitas.

== Personal life ==
He was married, since 1868, to Rosa Maria Antunes de Oliveira, niece of the Viscount of Mecejana, with whom he had three children:

- Joaquim Felício Antunes de Almeida Castro (c. 1871 – May 28, 1897), Bachelor of Law from the Faculty of Recife in 1891;
- Miguel Joaquim Antunes de Almeida Castro (died in Rio de Janeiro, August 16, 1935), married to Maria Magalhães Silva, had children;
- Rosa Maria Antunes de Almeida Castro (died in Recife, April 29, 1962), unmarried;
- Maria de Castro Freitas, born Maria Cristina Antunes de Almeida Castro (died in Recife, June 4, 1958), wife of Dr. Otávio de Freitas, with children.

Rosa Maria died at the age of 78, on October 22, 1930.
