= Mateus Simões =

Brazilian politician (born 1981)

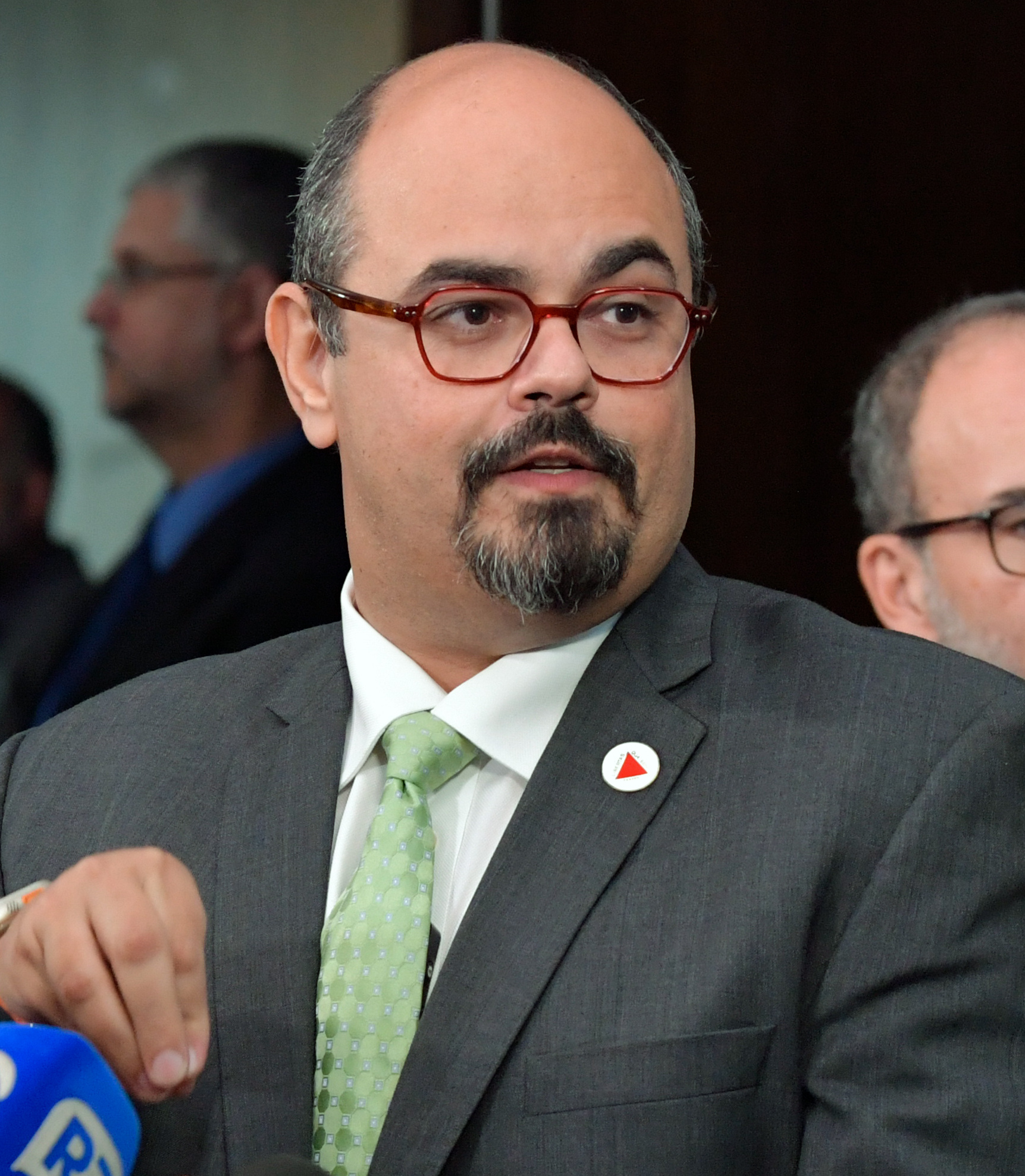
- Simões in 2024

Governor of Minas Gerais
- Incumbent
- Assumed office 22 March 2026
- Preceded by: Romeu Zema

Vice Governor of Minas Gerais
- In office 1 January 2023 – 22 March 2026
- Governor: Romeu Zema
- Preceded by: Paulo Brant

Personal details
- Born: Mateus Simões de Almeida; 9 March 1981 (age 45) Gurupi, Tocantins, Brasil
- Party: PSD (since 2025)
- Other political affiliations: NOVO (2016–2025)

Mateus Simões de Almeida (born 9 March 1981) is a Brazilian politician serving as vice governor of Minas Gerais since 2023. From 2020 to 2022, he served as secretary general of Minas Gerais. On March 22, 2026, he assumed the Governorship of Minas Gerais, replacing Romeu Zema.

== Electoral history ==
Year	Election	Party	Office	Coalition	Partners	Party	Votes	Percent	Result
2016	Municipal Election of Belo Horizonte	NOVO	Councillor	—N/a			5,522	0.46%	Elected
2022	State Elections of Minas Gerais	NOVO	Vice Governor	Minas on the Tracks (NOVO, Avante, PP, Solidariedade, PODE, Patriota, PMN, MDB, DC, Agir)	Romeu Zema	NOVO	6,094,136	56.20%	Elected

Political offices
Preceded by Paulo Brandt	Vice Governor of Minas Gerais; 2023–2026	Vacant
Preceded by Romeu Zema	Governor of Minas Gerais; 2026–present	Incumbent
