= Alberto Pinto Coelho Júnior =

Brazilian administrator and politician (1945–2023)

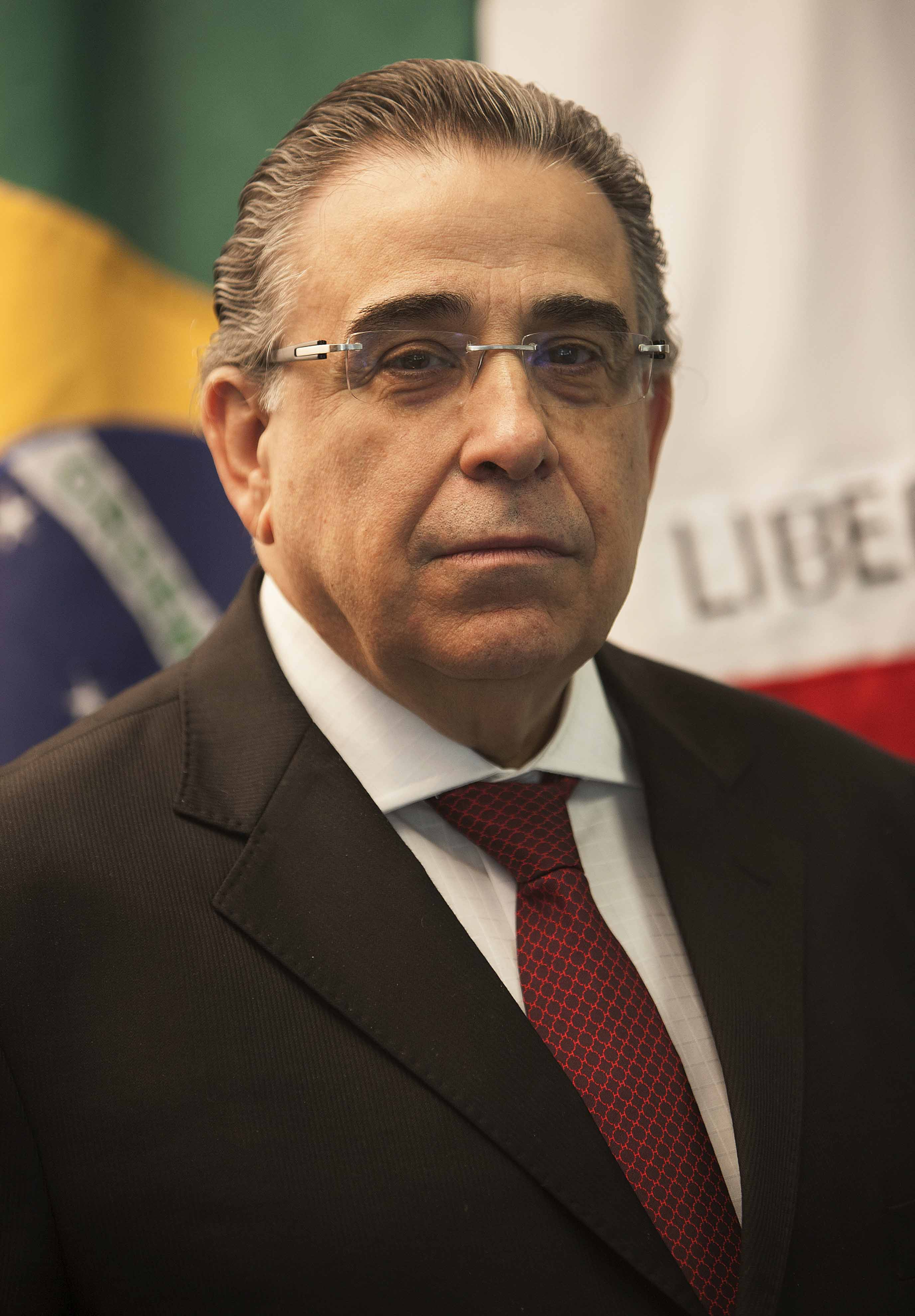
- Coelho in 2014

Governor of Minas Gerais
- In office 4 April 2014 – 1 January 2015
- Preceded by: Antonio Anastasia
- Succeeded by: Fernando Pimentel

Personal details
- Born: 3 October 1945; Rio Verde, Goiás, Brazil
- Died: 20 November 2023 (aged 78); Belo Horizonte, Minas Gerais, Brazil
- Political party: PP
- Occupation: Administrator

Alberto Pinto Coelho Júnior (3 October 1945 – 20 November 2023) was a Brazilian administrator and politician. A member of the Progressistas, Coelho served as Governor of Minas Gerais from 2014 to 2015.

Coelho died in Belo Horizonte on 20 November 2023, at the age of 78.
