= Milton Campos Law School =

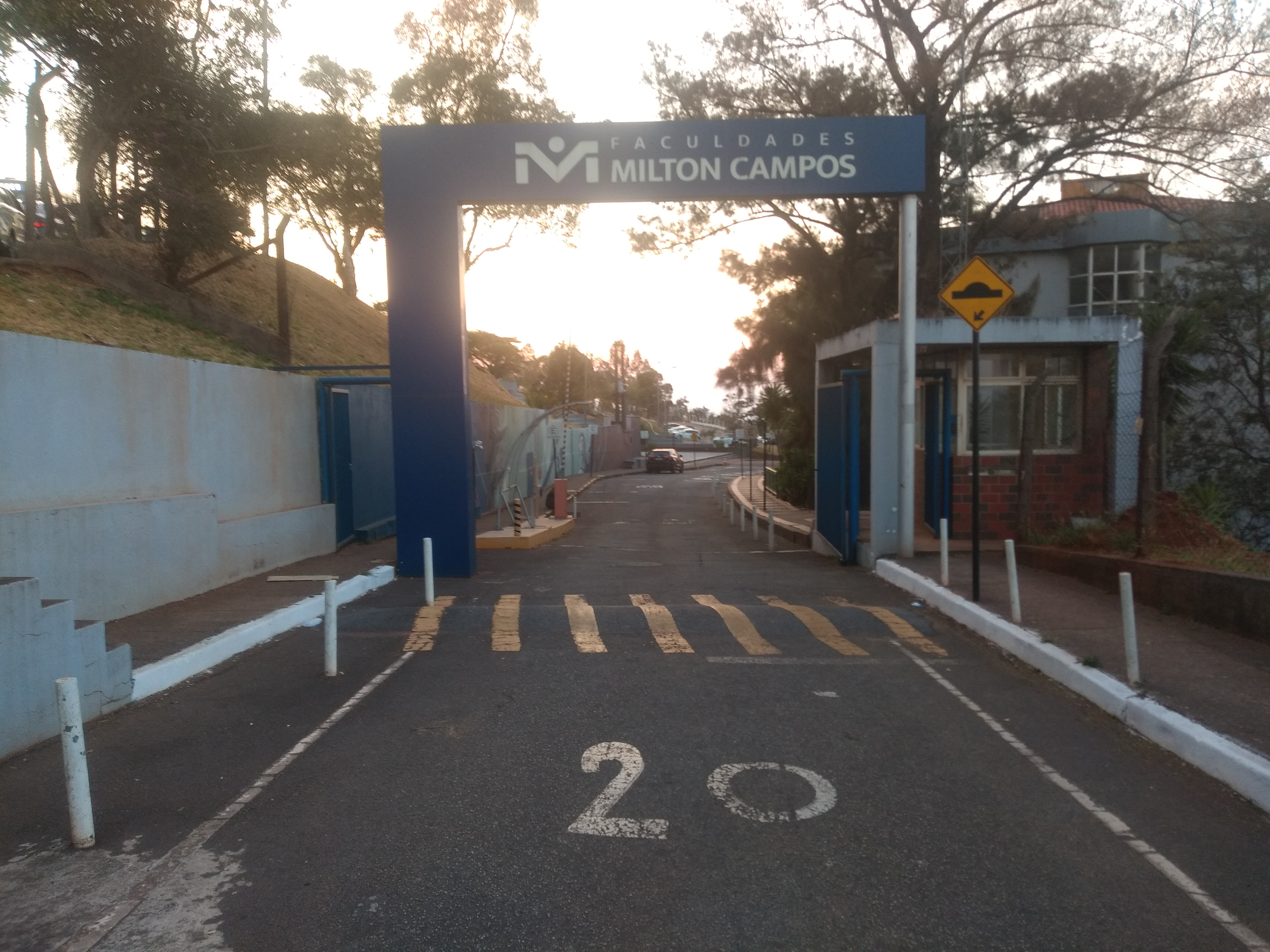
Entrance to the Faculdades Milton Campos, at Rua Senador Milton Campos, 202, Vila da Serra, Nova Lima.

The Milton Campos Law School (Portuguese: Faculdade de Direito Milton Campos (FDMC) is a private law school in the Brazilian state of Minas Gerais. Founded in 1975, it is one of the country's most prestigious law school. Several students from Milton Campos have achieved important positions in the Brazilian society. Earning a bachelor's degree (LL.B.) takes at least five years and eventual post-graduate diplomas (advanced university degrees in law) are completed in addition to the regular five-year program.
