= João Pinheiro Foundation =

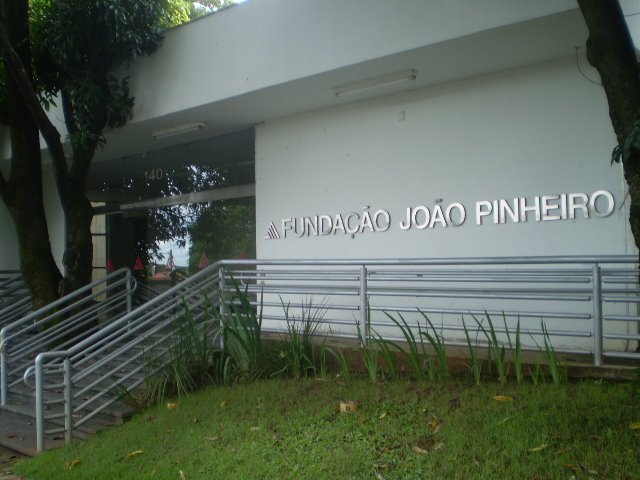
Fundação João Pinheiro

The João Pinheiro Foundation (Fundação João Pinheiro, FJP) is an entity of the government of Minas Gerais technical support to the Secretary of State for Planning and Management and other systems operating in the state.

It operates in the areas of undergraduate education, specialization and master's degree in public administration, public policy evaluation and production of statistical indicators, economic, financial, demographic and social. It provides technical services through contracts and agreements, primarily serving the demands of the government of Minas Gerais, other state governments, national and international organizations, municipalities and city councils, universities, private and state companies and organizations representing various social groups.

The João Pinheiro Foundation is installed on a total area of 13 thousand square meters, the street of Acacias, the São Luís (St. Louis) neighbourhood, in Pampulha, five minutes from Pampulha airport.

The name of the foundation is a tribute to the politician João Pinheiro da Silva, president of Minas Gerais in 1890 and between 1906 and 1908.

== Courses ==
- Degrees: Degree in Public Administration (ACSC)
- Master's: Public Administration
- Extension: Urban Management Programme and Cities
- Specialization: Public Administration (PROAP)

== Subdivisions ==
- Centro de Estatísticas e Informações (CEI)
- Centro de Estudos em Políticas Públicas (CEPP)
- Escola de Governo Paulo Neves de Carvalho (EG)
- Diretoria de Planejamento Gestão e Finanças (DPGF)
