= Rodolfo Gustavo da Paixão =

Brazilian marshal and politician (1853–1925)

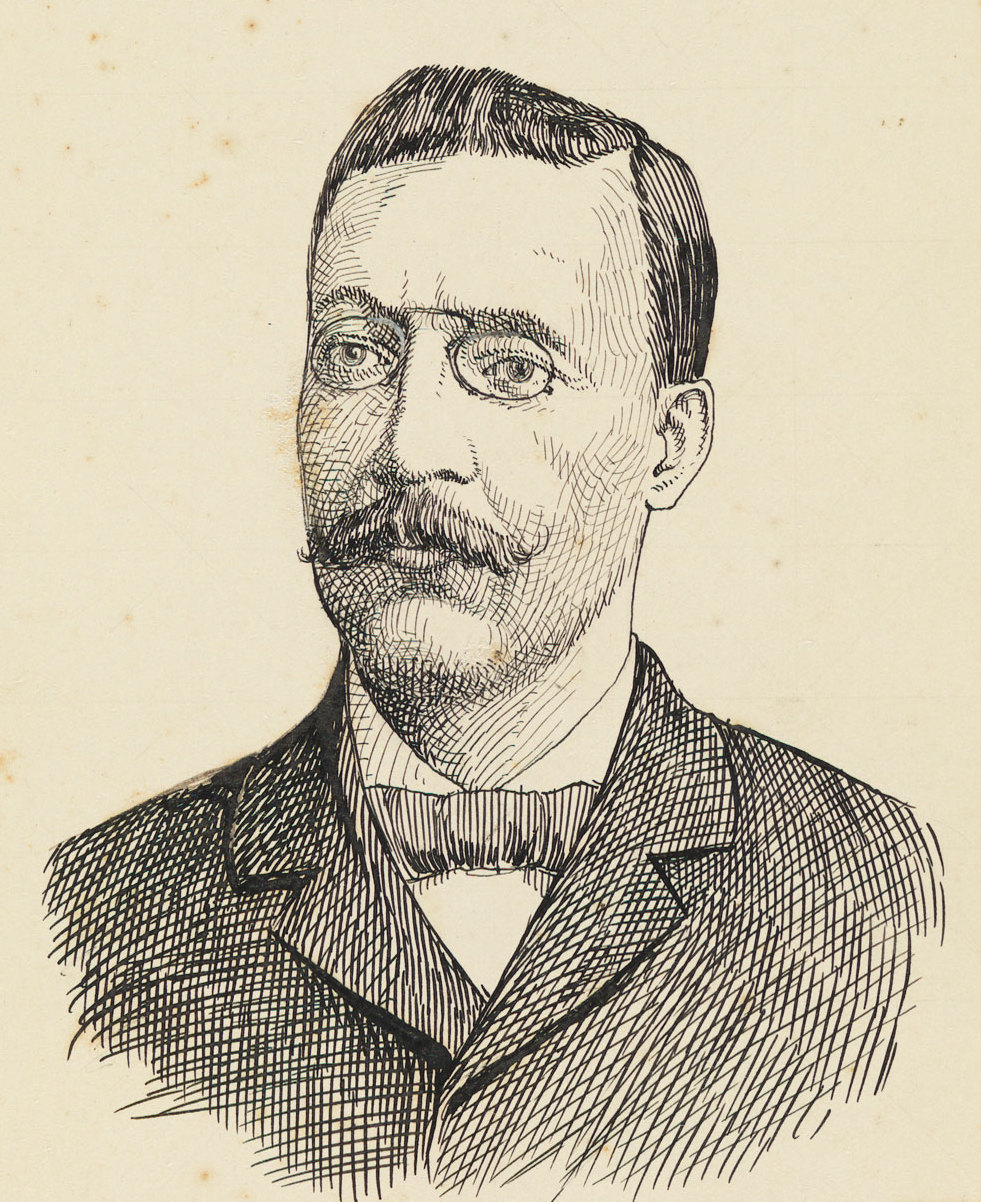

Rodolfo Gustavo da Paixão (13 July 1853 - 18 November 1925) was a Brazilian marshal and politician, who served as the Governor of the state of Goiás twice, February 1890 to January 1891, and again July to December 1891. He was decorated with the Knight of the Military Order of Avis and Gold Military Medal.
