= Piranga, Minas Gerais =

Brazilian municipality located in the state of Minas Gerais

Coordinates: 20°41′S 43°18′W

- Municipality
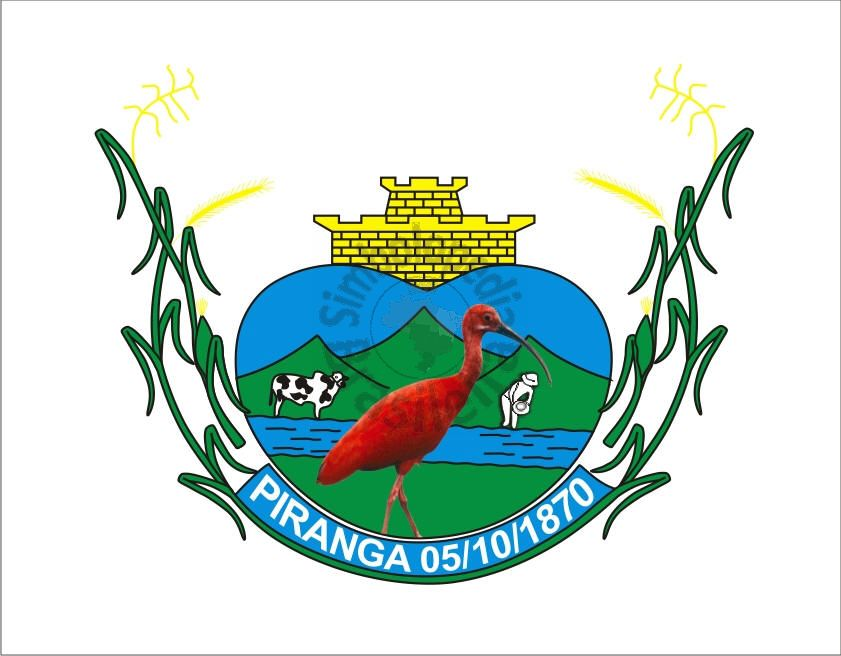
- Coat of arms
- Interactive map of Piranga, Minas Gerais
- Country: Brazil
- State: Minas Gerais
- Region: Southeast

Population (2022 Census)
  - Total: 17,018
  - Estimate (2025): 17,358
- Time zone: UTC−3 (BRT)

Location of Piranga within Minas Gerais

Piranga is a Brazilian municipality located in the state of Minas Gerais. The city belongs to the mesoregion of Zona da Mata and to the microregion of Viçosa. As of 2025, the estimated population was 17,358.

== See also ==
- List of municipalities in Minas Gerais
