= Oliveira Fortes =

Coordinates: 21°20′S 43°27′W

- Municipality
- Interactive map of Oliveira Fortes
- Country: Brazil
- Region: Southeast
- State: Minas Gerais
- Mesoregion: Vale do Rio Doce

Population (2020)
  - Total: 2,130
- Time zone: UTC−3 (BRT)

Oliveira Fortes is a municipality in the state of Minas Gerais in the Southeast region of Brazil.

== See also ==
- List of municipalities in Minas Gerais
