= Senhora do Porto =

Coordinates: 18°53′S 43°06′W

- Municipality
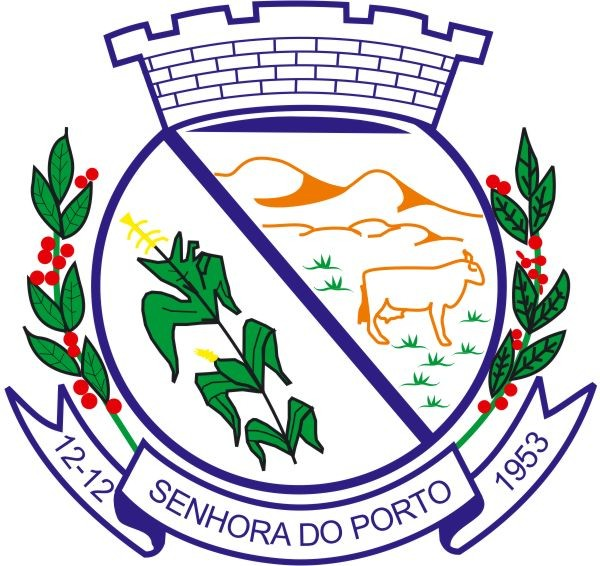
- Coat of arms
- Interactive map of Senhora do Porto
- Country: Brazil
- Region: Southeast
- State: Minas Gerais
- Mesoregion: Vale do Rio Doce

Population (2022 Census)
  - Total: 3,067
  - Estimate (2025): 3,066
- Time zone: UTC−3 (BRT)

Senhora do Porto is a municipality, in the state of Minas Gerais in the Southeast region of Brazil.

== See also ==
- List of municipalities in Minas Gerais
