= Ipueiras, Ceará =

Municipality in Ceará, Brazil

Ipueiras
- Municipality
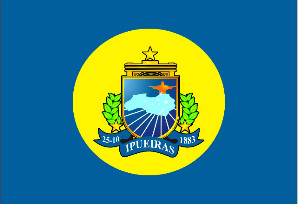
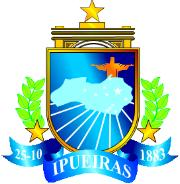
- Flag Coat of arms

- Location in Brazil
- Coordinates: 4°32′35″S 40°43′00″W
- Country: Brazil
- Region: Nordeste
- State: Ceará
- Mesoregion: Noroeste Cearense

Population (2020)
  - Total: 38,114
- Time zone: UTC−3 (BRT)

Ipueiras is a municipality in the state of Ceará in the Northeast region of Brazil. The population as of 2020 is 38,114.

== See also ==
- List of municipalities in Ceará
