= Augusto de Lima =

Brazilian politician

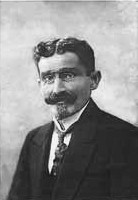

President of Minas Gerais
- In office 18 March 1891 – 15 June 1891
- Preceded by: Frederico Álavares da Silva
- Succeeded by: Cesário Alvim

Member of the Chamber of Deputies
- In office 1909–1929
- Constituency: Minas Gerais

Personal details
- Born: 5 April 1859 Congonhas de Sabará, Minas Gerais, Empire of Brazil
- Died: 22 April 1934 (aged 75)
- Spouse: Vera Monteiro de Barros de Suckow
- Occupation: Author and jurist

Antônio Augusto de Lima (5 April 1859 – 22 April 1934) was a Brazilian journalist, poet, musician, magistrate, jurist, professor and politician. He was born in Congonhas de Sabará (now Nova Lima).

Augusto de Lima was president of the state of Minas Gerais, and he idealized the transfer of the state's capital from Ouro Preto to Belo Horizonte (then "Curral Del Rey"). In 1903, he became a member of the Brazilian Academy of Letters and was elected its president in 1928.

In 1906, Augusto de Lima was elected federal deputy (house representative) and moved to Rio de Janeiro, the federal district. There, he married Vera Monteiro de Barros de Suckow, granddaughter of Hans Wilhelm von Suckow, Major of the Prussian Army (who fought Napoleon's army in the Battle of Waterloo) and patron of Brazil's horse racing — the first breeder of race horses in Brazil.

As a politician, Augusto de Lima defended female suffrage and was also an ecologist. He was strongly devoted to Saint Francis of Assisi, and was responsible for the first Amazon forest protection law in Brazil, implemented after a fifteen-year battle in congress.

== Bibliography ==
- Contemporâneas, poetry (1887)
- Símbolos poetry (1892)
- Poesias, poetry (1909)
- Noites de sábado, chronicles (1923)
- São Francisco de Assis, poetry (1930)
- Coletânea de poesias (1880–1934)
- Poetry (1959)
- Tiradentes, poetry
- Antes da Sombra, poetry (not released).
