= Maria José de Castro Rebello Mendes =

- Born: September 20, 1890
- Died: October 29, 1936 (aged 46)
- Occupation: Diplomat

Maria José de Castro Rebello Mendes (Salvador, September 20, 1891 – Rio de Janeiro, October 29, 1936) was the first Brazilian woman to be accepted to work for the Brazilian Ministry of Foreign Affairs, a controversial event back when women were expected to be subordinated to their husband.

== Early life ==
Maria José de Castro was born to a wealthy family in the city of Salvador, Brazil. Her father died when she was young and her mother, to support the family and her education, opened a school called Colégio Alemão. Rebello Mendes excelled in her studies, becoming fluent in German, French, Italian and English. However, with the death of her mother, she moved to Rio de Janeiro state.

== Career ==
In Rio de Janeiro, Rebello Mendes briefly worked as a private tutor for children, but her income was not enough to her. A relative told her about the Ministry of Foreign Affairs public examination for oficial de secretaria. She enrolled in Escola do Comércio to learn typing, international law, and other disciplines. She then applied to the Ministry of Foreign Affairs in April 1918. At first, Rebello Mendes was dissuaded to give up but she did not turn down her opportunity to work there. Nilo Peçanha defended her aṕplication, arguing that many of the abilities required for the job, like discretion, was not exclusive to men. Rebello Mendes and eight men took the exams during two weeks and she placed first. Local newspapers vocalized their fears that a woman working for the Ministry of Foreign Affairs undermined men from government offices.
