= List of governors of Minas Gerais =

Heads of Minas Gerais

Governor of Minas Gerais
- Governador de Minas Gerais
- Standard of the governor

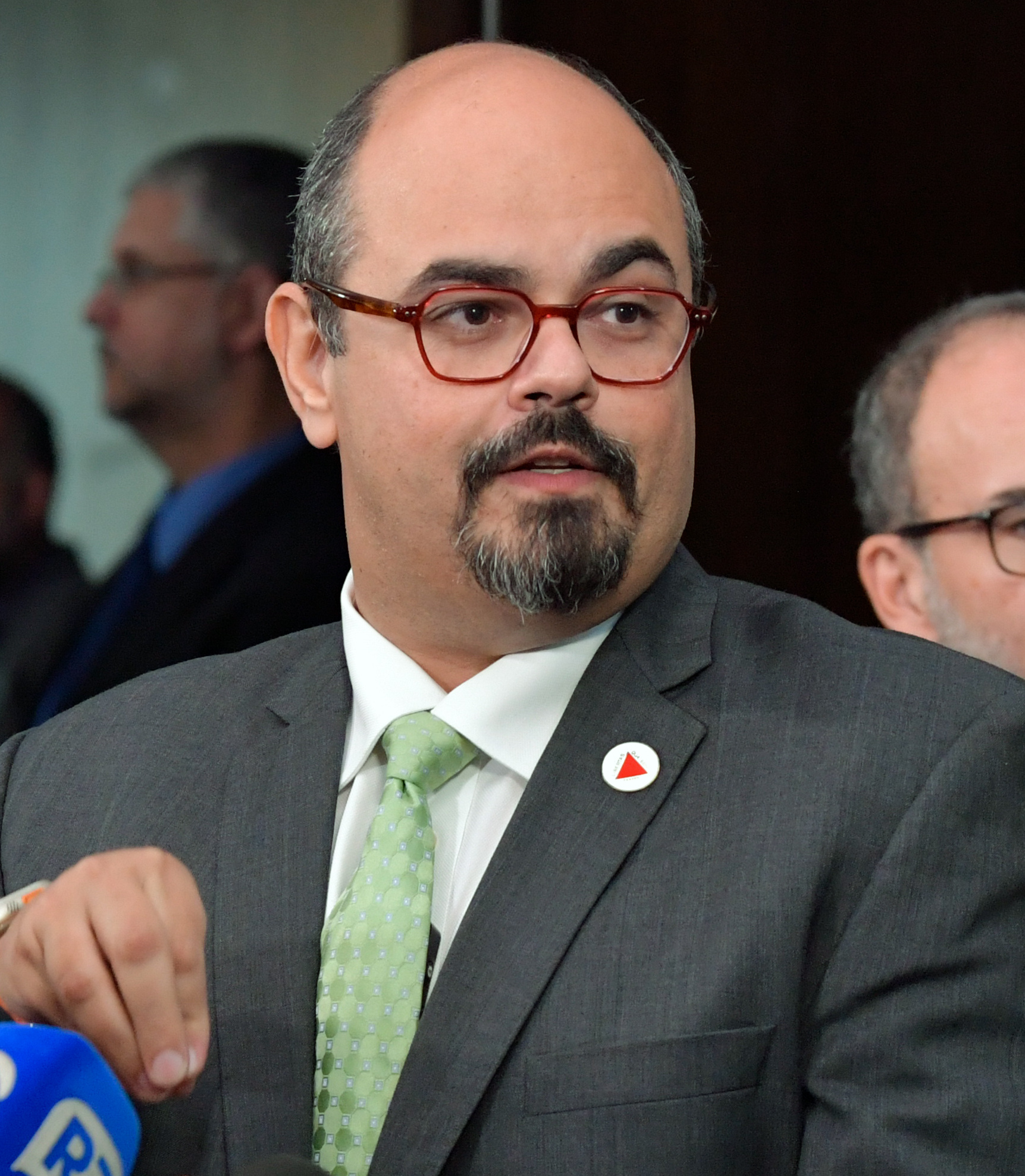
- Incumbent; Mateus Simões since 22 March 2026
- Style: Mr. Governor or even simply Governor (informal); Most Excellent Mr. Governor (formal); His Excellency (alternative formal, diplomatic)
- Status: Head of government
- Residence: Palácio das Mangabeiras (official)
- Term length: Four years, renewable once
- Constituting instrument: 1989 State Constitution
- Precursor: President of the Province of Minas Gerais (until 1891); President of the State of Minas Gerais (until 1946)
- Inaugural holder: Antônio Olinto
- Formation: 15 June 1891; 135 years ago
- Deputy: Vice Governor
- Salary: Net R$30,556.76 (US$5,669.16)
- Website: www.mg.gov.br

The Governor of Minas Gerais is the position of the head of government of Minas Gerais, Brazil. The current governor is Mateus Simões from the PSD.

== First Brazilian Republic (1889–1930) ==
No.	Portrait	Governor	Took office	Left office	Time in office	Party	Election
–	Antônio Olinto	Antônio Olinto; Acting	17 November 1889	24 November 1889	7 days	PRM	–
–	Cesário Alvim	Cesário Alvim; Acting	25 November 1889	10 February 1890	78 days	PRM	–
–	João Pinheiro	João Pinheiro; Acting	10 February 1890	20 July 1890	160 days	PRM	–
–	Domingos José da Rocha	Domingos José da Rocha; Acting	20 July 1890	23 July 1890	3 days	PRM	–
–	Bias Fortes	Bias Fortes; Acting	23 July 1890	5 August 1890	13 days	PRM	–
–	Domingos José da Rocha	Domingos José da Rocha; Acting	5 August 1890	13 August 1890	8 days	PRM	–
–	Bias Fortes	Bias Fortes; Acting	13 August 1890	3 October 1890	51 days	PRM	–
–	Domingos José da Rocha	Domingos José da Rocha; Acting	3 October 1890	27 December 1890	85 days	PRM	–
–	Bias Fortes	Bias Fortes; Acting	27 December 1890	28 December 1890	1 day	PRM	–
–	Frederico Augusto Álvares da Silva	Frederico Augusto Álvares da Silva; Acting	28 December 1890	6 January 1891	9 days	PRM	–
–	Bias Fortes	Bias Fortes; Acting	6 January 1891	12 February 1891	37 days	PRM	–
–	Frederico Augusto Álvares da Silva	Frederico Augusto Álvares da Silva; Acting	12 February 1891	18 March 1891	34 days	PRM	–
–	Augusto de Lima	Augusto de Lima; Acting	18 March 1891	16 June 1891	90 days	PRM	–
1	Cesário Alvim	Cesário Alvim; Acting	16 June 1891	9 February 1892	238 days	PRM	–
–	Eduardo Ernesto Gama	Eduardo Ernesto Gama; Acting	9 February 1892	13 July 1892	155 days	PRM	–
2	Afonso Pena	Afonso Pena	14 July 1892	7 September 1894	2 years, 55 days	PRM	1892
3	Bias Fortes	Bias Fortes	7 September 1894	7 September 1898	4 years, 0 days	PRM	1894
4	Silviano Brandão	Silviano Brandão	7 September 1898	21 February 1902	3 years, 167 days	PRM	1898
5	Joaquim Cândido Senna	Joaquim Cândido Senna; Acting	21 February 1902	7 September 1902	198 days	PRM	1898
6	Francisco Sales	Francisco Sales	7 September 1902	7 September 1906	4 years, 0 days	PRM	1902
7	João Pinheiro	João Pinheiro	7 September 1906	25 October 1908	2 years, 48 days	PRM	1906
8	Júlio Bueno Brandão	Júlio Bueno Brandão; Acting	25 October 1908	3 April 1909	160 days	PRM	1906
9	Venceslau Brás	Venceslau Brás	3 April 1909	7 September 1910	1 year, 157 days	PRM	1909
10	Júlio Bueno Brandão	Júlio Bueno Brandão	7 September 1910	7 September 1914	4 years, 0 days	PRM	1910
11	Delfim Moreira	Delfim Moreira	7 September 1914	7 September 1918	4 years, 0 days	PRM	1914
12	Artur Bernardes	Artur Bernardes	7 September 1918	7 September 1922	4 years, 0 days	PRM	1918
13	Raul Soares	Raul Soares	7 September 1922	4 August 1924	1 year, 332 days	PRM	1922
14	Olegário Maciel	Olegário Maciel; Acting	4 August 1924	21 December 1924	139 days	PRM	1922
15	Melo Viana	Melo Viana	21 December 1924	7 September 1926	1 year, 260 days	PRM	1924
16	Antônio Carlos	Antônio Carlos	7 September 1926	7 September 1930	4 years, 0 days	PRM	1926

== Vargas Era (1930–1946) ==
No.	Portrait	Governor	Took office	Left office	Time in office	Party	Election
17	Olegário Maciel	Olegário Maciel	7 September 1930	5 September 1933	2 years, 363 days	Social Nationalist	1930
18	Gustavo Capanema	Gustavo Capanema	5 September 1933	15 December 1933	101 days	PP	–
19	Benedito Valadares	Benedito Valadares	15 December 1933	4 November 1945	11 years, 324 days	AL	–

== Fourth Brazilian Republic (1946–1964) ==
No.	Portrait	Governor	Took office	Left office	Time in office	Party	Election
–	Nísio Batista	Nísio Batista; Acting	4 November 1945	3 February 1946	91 days	Independent	–
20	João Beraldo	João Beraldo; Acting	3 February 1946	14 August 1946	192 days	PP	–
21	Júlio Ferreira de Carvalho	Júlio Ferreira de Carvalho; Acting	14 August 1946	16 November 1946	94 days	AL	–
22	Noraldino Lima	Noraldino Lima; Acting	17 November 1946	20 December 1946	33 days	AL	–
23	Alcides Lins	Alcides Lins; Acting	21 December 1946	19 March 1947	88 days	PP	–
24	Milton Campos	Milton Campos	19 March 1947	31 January 1951	3 years, 318 days	UDN	1947
25	Juscelino Kubitschek	Juscelino Kubitschek	31 January 1951	31 March 1955	4 years, 59 days	PSD	1950
26	Clóvis Salgado	Clóvis Salgado; Acting	31 March 1955	31 January 1956	306 days	PSD	1950
27	José Bias Fortes	José Bias Fortes	31 January 1956	31 January 1961	5 years, 0 days	PSD	1955
28	Magalhães Pinto	Magalhães Pinto	31 January 1961	31 January 1966	5 years, 0 days	UDN	1960

== Military Dictatorship (1964–1985) ==
No.	Portrait	Governor	Took office	Left office	Time in office	Party	Election
29	Israel Pinheiro	Israel Pinheiro	31 January 1966	15 March 1971	5 years, 43 days	PSD	1965
30	Rondon Pacheco	Rondon Pacheco	15 March 1971	15 March 1975	4 years, 0 days	ARENA	1970
31	Aureliano Chaves	Aureliano Chaves	15 March 1975	5 July 1978	4 years, 0 days	ARENA	1974
32	Ozanam Coelho	Ozanam Coelho; Acting	5 July 1978	15 March 1979	253 days	ARENA	1974
33	Francelino Pereira	Francelino Pereira	15 March 1979	15 March 1983	4 years, 0 days	PDS	1978
34	Tancredo Neves	Tancredo Neves	15 March 1983	14 August 1984	1 year, 152 days	MDB	1982

== Sixth Brazilian Republic (1985–present) ==
No.	Portrait	Governor	Took office	Left office	Time in office	Party	Election
35	Hélio Garcia	Hélio Garcia; Acting	14 August 1984	15 March 1987	2 years, 213 days	MDB	1982
36	Newton Cardoso	Newton Cardoso	15 March 1987	15 March 1991	4 years, 0 days	MDB	1986
37	Hélio Garcia	Hélio Garcia	15 March 1991	1 January 1995	3 years, 292 days	PTB	1990
38	Eduardo Azeredo	Eduardo Azeredo	1 January 1995	1 January 1999	4 years, 0 days	PSDB	1994
39	Itamar Franco	Itamar Franco	1 January 1999	1 January 2003	4 years, 0 days	MDB	1998
40	Aécio Neves	Aécio Neves	1 January 2003	31 March 2010	7 years, 89 days	PSDB	2002 2006
41	Antônio Anastasia	Antônio Anastasia	31 March 2010	4 April 2014	4 years, 4 days	PSDB	2010
42	Alberto Pinto Coelho	Alberto Pinto Coelho; Acting	4 April 2014	1 January 2015	272 days	PP	2010
43	Fernando Pimentel	Fernando Pimentel	1 January 2015	1 January 2019	4 years, 0 days	PT	2014
44	Romeu Zema	Romeu Zema	1 January 2019	22 March 2026	7 years, 80 days	NOVO	2018 2022
45	Mateus Simões	Mateus Simões	22 March 2026	Incumbent	169 days	PSD	2026
