= João Pinheiro =

Brazilian lawyer, industrialist and politician

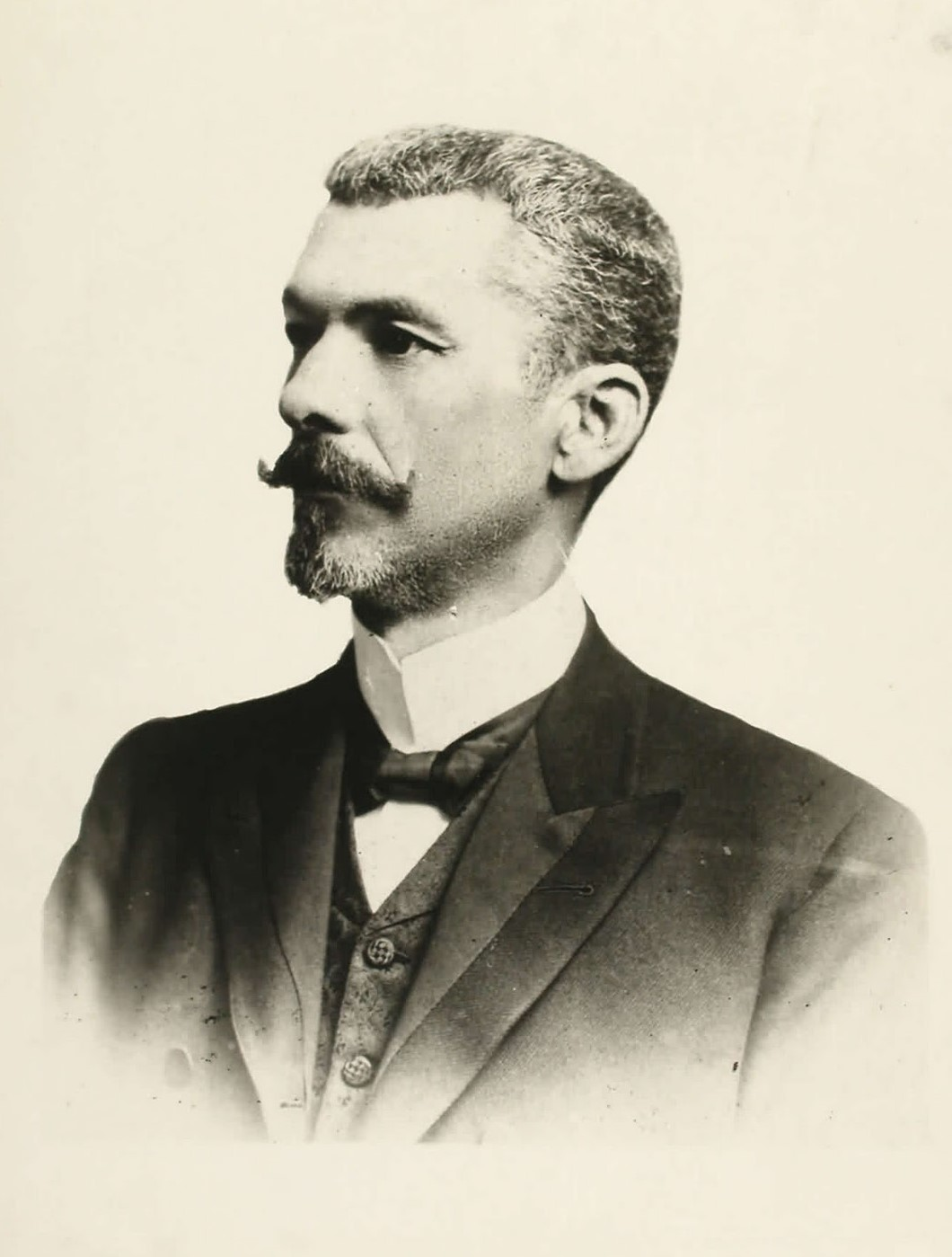
- Pinheiro, 1906

President of Minas Gerais
- In office 7 September 1906 – 25 October 1908
- Vice President: Bueno Brandão
- Preceded by: Francisco Antônio de Sales
- Succeeded by: Bueno Brandão
- In office 11 February 1890 – 20 July 1890
- Preceded by: Cesário Alvim
- Succeeded by: Domingos José da Rocha

Personal details
- Born: 16 December 1860 Serro, Minas Gerais, Empire of Brazil
- Died: 25 October 1908 (aged 47) Belo Horizonte, Minas Gerais, Brazil
- Party: PRM
- Spouse: Helena de Barros (m. 1889)
- Education: Faculty of Law of São Paulo (LL.B)

João Pinheiro da Silva (16 December 1860 – 25 October 1908) was a Brazilian lawyer, industrialist and politician who served as president of Minas Gerais. A defender of republicanism during Brazil's Imperial era, Pinheiro became the main republican figure in Minas Gerais, leading the foundation of the Republican Party of Minas Gerais in 1888.

== Early life and education ==
The youngest son of Giuseppe Pignataro and Carolina Augusta de Morais, João Pinheiro was born on 16 December 1860 in Serro, Minas Gerais. Pignataro was an Italian immigrant who arrived in Brazil in 1848, changing his name to José Pinheiro da Silva, while Carolina, born in Caeté on 22 May 1839, was the daughter of Antônio Pedro Pinto, a primary school teacher, and Joaquina Rosa de Morais. The couple married in Ouro Preto in 1854 and later moved to Serro with the help of Carolina's brother, Luiz Antônio Pinto. João Pinheiro's brothers were José Pinheiro (b. 1856) and João Pinheiro, who died just a few months old in 1859.

According to Maria Marta Araújo, João Pinheiro's father had "stable" financial conditions until 1862, when his situation took a sudden turn for the worse after he was arrested and tried on charges of being an accomplice of a group of Italians in the theft of gold coins and the murder of a local landowner's slave. In April of that year, three of the accused were sentenced to death and one was sentenced to life imprisonment for being a minor. Pignataro was acquitted, but his image and finances were ruined, (Note: The events were reported by newspapers at the time, Araújo 2022, p. 28.) forcing the family to move to Nossa Senhora do Porto (currently Senhora do Porto), then a district of Serro. Pignataro struggled to provide for the family, making several trips in search of work. In 1869, seeking better opportunities, he decided to go on a trip to Rio de Janeiro, during which he contracted yellow fever and died in Ouro Preto in 1870.

Pignataro's death forced the widow to live with relatives in several cities in Minas Gerais until settling in her native Caeté. Faced with financial difficulties, Carolina sent João and José to study at the Mariana Seminary. After finishing his secondary studies at the seminary, João Pinheiro enrolled in the engineering course at the Mining School of Ouro Preto in 1881. Before finishing the course, however, he left the Mining School to study at the Faculty of Law of São Paulo in 1883.

Pinheiro initially needed his brother's help to pay for his studies at the Faculty of Law. In 1884, teacher Cipriano José de Carvalho, who also helped him, got him a job as a janitor at the Normal School of São Paulo. In 1885, Pinheiro was appointed substitute teacher at the school. The next year, he became an elector by the Republican Party in São Paulo and began to support abolitionism. While studying at the Faculty of Law, he published articles in newspapers defending a republic in Brazil. Pinheiro fell in love with a student of the Normal School, Helena de Barros, who was the daughter of a powerful coffee planter from São Paulo; Helena's father was against his daughter's marriage to Pinheiro. Pinheiro graduated with a bachelor's degree in Law and Social Sciences on 18 November 1887.

== Historical republican ==
After graduating from the Faculty of Law, João Pinheiro moved to Ouro Preto, then the capital of Minas Gerais, where he opened a law firm together with Francisco de Assis Barcelos Correia. Soon after, however, Pinheiro became involved with politics and active in the republican propaganda, allying himself with Cesário Alvim, a dissident from the Liberal Party and enemy of the Viscount of Ouro Preto. Pinheiro was one of the organizers of the Republican Club in Ouro Preto, and also led the creation of the Republican Party of Minas Gerais (PRM), which was founded on 4 June 1888, becoming director of the party's journal, O Movimento, which began to circulate on 23 January 1889, becoming Minas Gerais' most circulated one. In this journal Pinheiro defended the separation of church and state, freedom of teaching, the democratization of Justice, and a federation.

In 1889, Pinheiro became one of the main republican propagandists in Minas Gerais, helping to spread republican ideas in various parts of the province. That same year, on 15 November 1889, the republic was proclaimed in Brazil.

== Governor of Minas Gerais ==
Pinheiro was elected president (governor) of Minas Gerais in 1906, taking office on 7 September of that year and succeeding Francisco Antônio de Sales.

== Death ==
Pinheiro died before finishing his term on 25 October 1908, being succeeded by vice-president Júlio Bueno Brandão.
