= Israel Pinheiro =

Brazilian politician and engineer

Israel Pinheiro da Silva
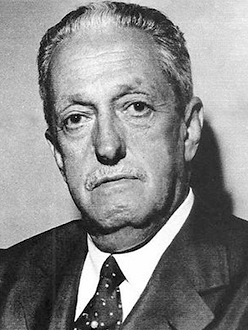
- Israel Pinheiro monument in Brasília

Personal details
- Born: 4 January 1896 Caeté, Minas Gerais, Brazil
- Died: 6 July 1973 (aged 77) Belo Horizonte, Brazil

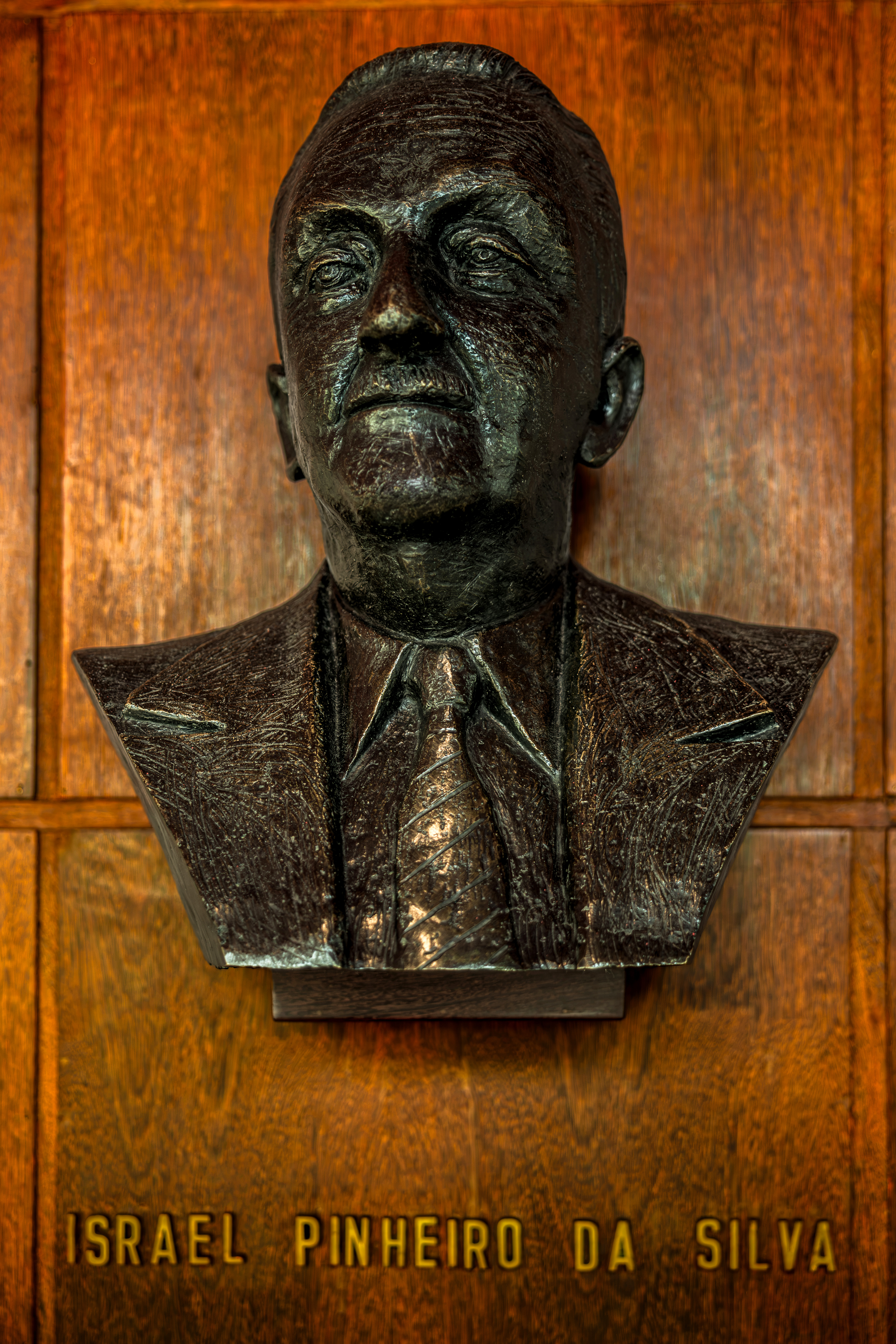
Bronze bust of Israel Pinheiro da Silva at Palácio das Artes in Belo Horizonte, Minas Gerais, Brazil

Israel Pinheiro da Silva (4 January 1896 – 6 July 1973) was a Brazilian politician and engineer.

Pinheiro da Silva was a friend of President Juscelino Kubitschek and was nominated by him the engineer chief of the construction of Brasília, which took place between 1956 and 1960. Despite being an opponent of the military regime installed in 1964, Pinheiro da Silva was elected governor of Minas Gerais in a disputed election in 1965 and he served from 1966 to 1971. He continued the industrialization of the state, started by his predecessors. Pinheiro da Silva was the last directly elected governor of Minas Gerais until 1982.

== See also ==
- List of governors of Minas Gerais
