= A viuvinha =

A viuvinha may refer to:

- A viuvinha (novel), an 1857 novel by José de Alencar
- A Viuvinha (film), a 1914 Brazilian silent romantic drama film, based on the novel
