= A viuvinha (novel) =

1857 novel by José de Alencar

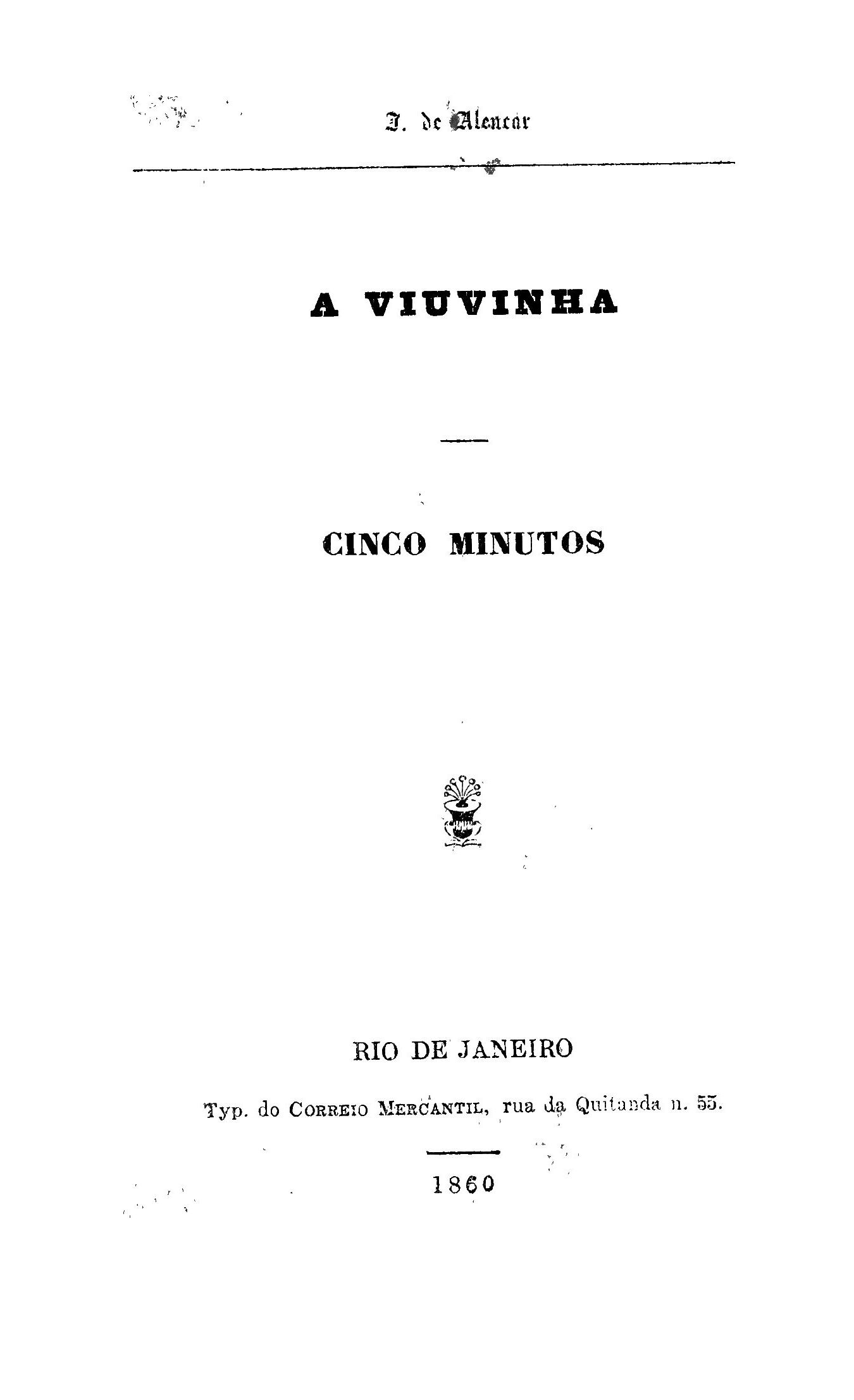

A viuvinha (The Little Widow) is a novel written by the Brazilian writer José de Alencar. It was first published in 1857. Luis de Barros adapted it into a film in 1914.

In the story, a young Brazilian man plans to marry a young woman he met in a church. On the day before the wedding, however, he learns that he has squandered his inheritance and let the company he owns go bankrupt. The man follows through with the ceremony, but then fakes suicide and flees to the United States. He lives in the United States for three years, slowly recovering his fortune, then returns to Brazil to reunite with his bride, who has remained faithful to him.
