= A Viuvinha (film) =

1914 film directed by Luiz de Barros

- Directed by: Luiz de Barros
- Written by: Based on the novel A Viuvinha by José de Alencar.
- Cinematography: João Stamato
- Production company: Carioca Filmes
- Release date: 1914
- Country: Brazil
- Language: Silent

A Viuvinha is a 1914 Brazilian silent romantic drama film directed by Luiz de Barros and starring Linda Bianchi and Gita de Barros.

== Cast ==
- Linda Bianchi
- Gita de Barros
- Luiz de Barros
- Fausto Muniz
