= Sérgio Pereira Couto =

Portuguese-Brazilian writer

Sergio Couto
- Born: March 6, 1967 (age 58); São Paulo

Sérgio Pereira Couto (born 6 March 1967) is a Portuguese-Brazilian writer. He has worked for publications including Ciência Criminal, Discovery Magazine, PC Brasil, Geek!, Galileu, Planeta.

== Works ==
=== Fiction ===
- Sociedades Secretas
- Investigação Criminal
- Os Heróis de Esparta
- Renascimento
- Sociedades Secretas – O Submundo
- Help – a Lenda de um Beatlemaníaco
- Jogos Criminais
- Histórias do Tarô
- Jogos Criminais 2
- Anno Domini 2
- A Batalha dos Deuses

=== Non fiction ===
- Sociedades Secretas: A Verdade Sobre o Código da Vinci
- Decifrando a Fortaleza Digital
- Sociedades Secretas: Maçonaria
- Sociedades Secretas: Templários
- Dicionário Secreto da Maçonaria
- A História Secreta dos Piratas
- Evangelho de Judas e Outros Mistérios
- A História Secreta de Roma
- Seitas Secretas
- Maçonaria Para Não-Iniciados
- Dossiê Hitler
- A Incrível História da Bíblia
- Desvendando o Egito
- Os Segredos do Nazismo
- Segredos e Lendas do Rock'
- A Extraordinária História da China
- Códigos e Cifras – da Antiguidade à Era Moderna
- Segredos da Cabala
- As Dez Sociedades Mais Influentes da História
- Sociedades Secretas: Illuminati
- Os Segredos das Investigações Criminais
- Hitler e os Segredos do Nazismo vols. 1 e 2
- Segredos da Bruxaria
- Almanaque das Guerras
- Decifrando o Símbolo Perdido
- Manual de Investigação Forense
- Desvendando a Maçonaria
- Dossiê John Lennon
- 2012 X Nostradamus
- Arquivos Secretos do Vaticano
- O Homem Que Previa o Futuro
- Almanaque das Sociedades Secretas
- WikiLeaks: Segredos, Informações e Poder (with José Antonio Domingos)
