= Modernism in Brazil =

Cultural movement in the 20th century

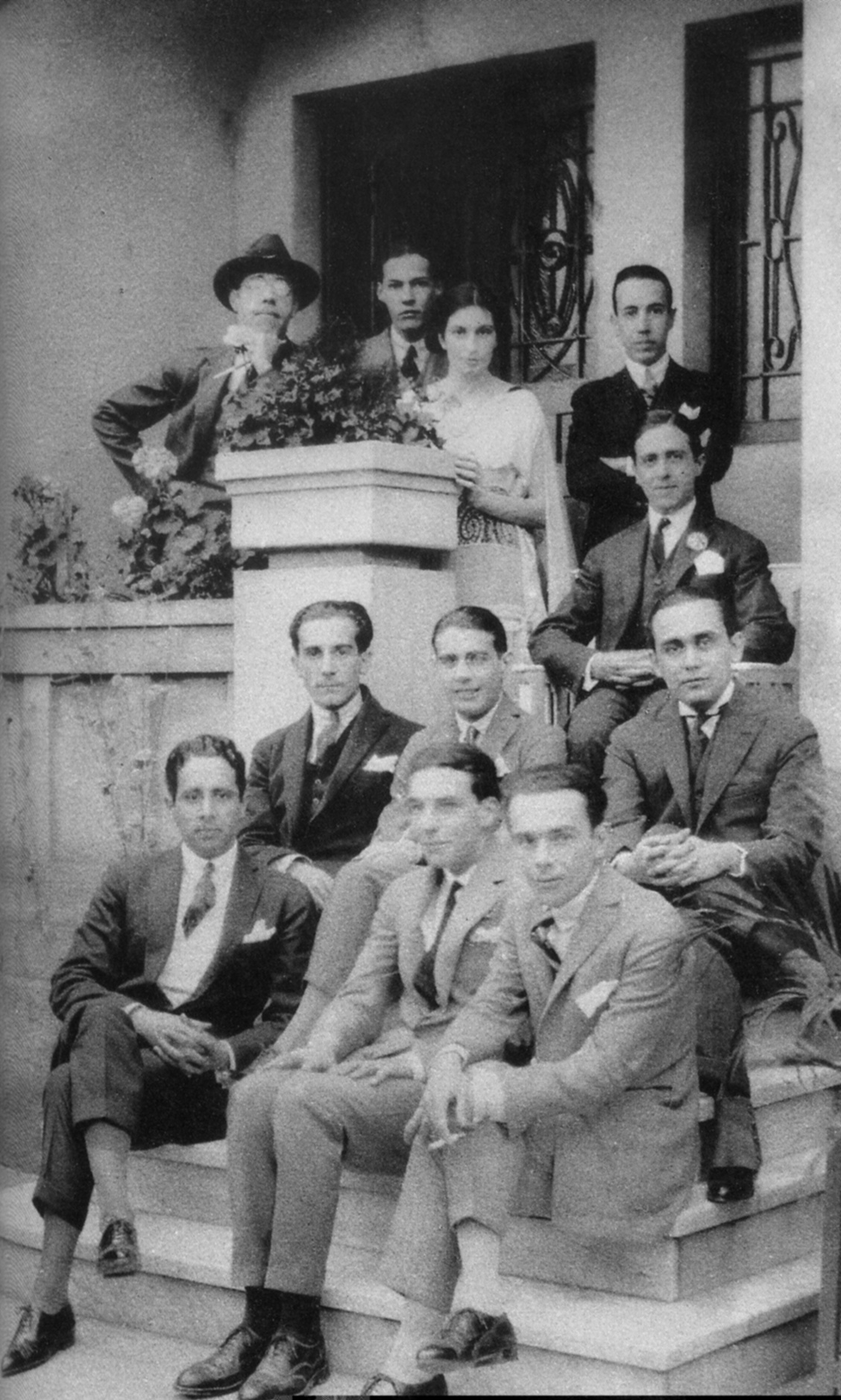
Mário de Andrade (top left), Rubens Borba de Moraes (seated, second from left) and other 1922 modernists, including (unidentified) Tácito de Almeida, Alcântara Machado, Guilherme de Almeida and Yan de Almeida Prado, in São Paulo, Brazil, 1922.

Modernism in Brazil was a broad cultural movement that strongly affected the art scene and Brazilian society in the first half of the 20th century, especially in the fields of literature and the plastic arts. It was inspired by the cultural and artistic trends launched in Europe in the period before the World War I such as Cubism, Futurism, Expressionism and Surrealism. These new modern languages brought by the European artistic and literary movements were gradually assimilated into the Brazilian artistic context, but with elements of the country's culture, as there was a need to valorize the national identity.

The Modern Art Week, which took place in São Paulo in 1922, is considered by official historiography to be the starting point of Modernism in Brazil. However, recent research reveals that artistic and cultural renewal initiatives were taking place in different parts of the country at that moment. According to some scholars, Recife pioneered this artistic movement in Brazil through the works of Vicente do Rego Monteiro, the poetry of Manuel Bandeira, the sociology of Gilberto Freyre, manifestations of popular culture such as frevo and cordel and the urban changes that occurred in the city during that period. For art critic Paulo Herkenhoff, former assistant curator of the Museum of Modern Art in New York, "the historiography of Pernambuco's culture has the challenge of confronting internal colonialism and the erasure of its history".

Not all the participants in the Modern Art Week were modernists, like Graça Aranha from Maranhão, one of the speakers at the event. The movement wasn't dominant from the start, but over time it replaced its predecessors through its freedom of style and approach to spoken language.

Didactically, Modernism is divided into three phases. The first, called Heroic, was the most radical and strongly opposed to everything that came before. The second, milder, called the 1930s Generation, produced great novelists and poets and was characterized by social and political concerns and regionalism, especially in the prose of the Northeast region. The third phase, called Post-Modernist by several authors (or also known as the 1945 Generation), opposed the first stage and was ridiculed with the nickname Parnassianism; it was characterized by a mixture of styles and a concern with aesthetics, whose predominant literary genre was poetry.

== First generation (1922–1930) - the Heroic phase ==
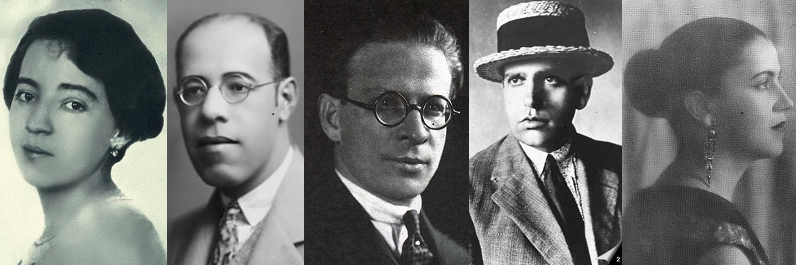
The Group of Five of Brazilian modernism: Anita Malfatti, Mário de Andrade, Menotti del Picchia, Oswald de Andrade and Tarsila do Amaral.

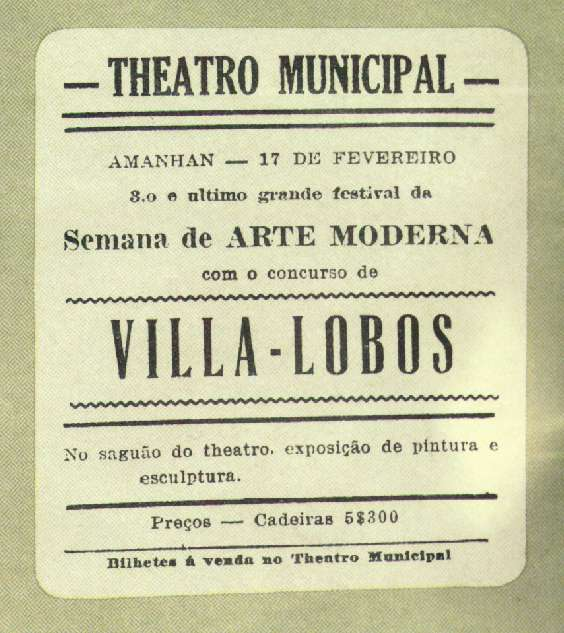
Poster announcing the last day of Modern Art Week.

The first phase of Modernism was characterized by an attempt to define positions, manifestos and fast-circulating magazines. It was the most radical period of the movement due to the necessity of breaking with all the structures of the past. Its anarchic character and strong sense of annihilation were called the "spirit of destruction" by Mário de Andrade.

Most of the intellectuals and artists who represented Modernism in Brazil lived in Europe in the period after the World War I and, from this experience, absorbed ideas and techniques that resulted in Brazilian Modernism. Consequently, all the excitement that characterized the beginning of the 20th century in Europe arrived in Brazil as a moment of renewal and the search to produce a new model of art that was concerned with social issues. However, it wasn't a copy of European art, but rather its own authentic and original art. With the beginning of the Brazilian avant-garde and the return of artists to the country, the necessity of organizing events to disseminate new ideas became a concern for them. In this context, the Modern Art Week took place in 1922, scheduled to commemorate the centenary of independence. Considered a milestone of Modernism in the country and in Latin America, the event featured poetry recitals, musical concerts and opened doors to a new artistic language in relation to different types of art, such as painting, poetry and literature.

There was a search for the modern and original. The return to the origins, through the valorization of the indigenous people and the language spoken by the people, were also addressed. However, nationalism was used in two different ways: critical, aligned with the political left by denouncing reality, and ufanistic, exaggerated and extreme right-wing. Due to the need for definitions and a break with all the structures of the past, this was the most radical phase.

A month after the Modern Art Week, Brazil was experiencing two moments of great political importance: the presidential elections and the founding congress of the Communist Party in Niterói. In 1926, the Democratic Party emerged, with Mário de Andrade as one of its founders, and in 1932, the Brazilian Integralist Action, a radical nationalist movement founded by Plínio Salgado was created.

=== Manifestos and magazines ===
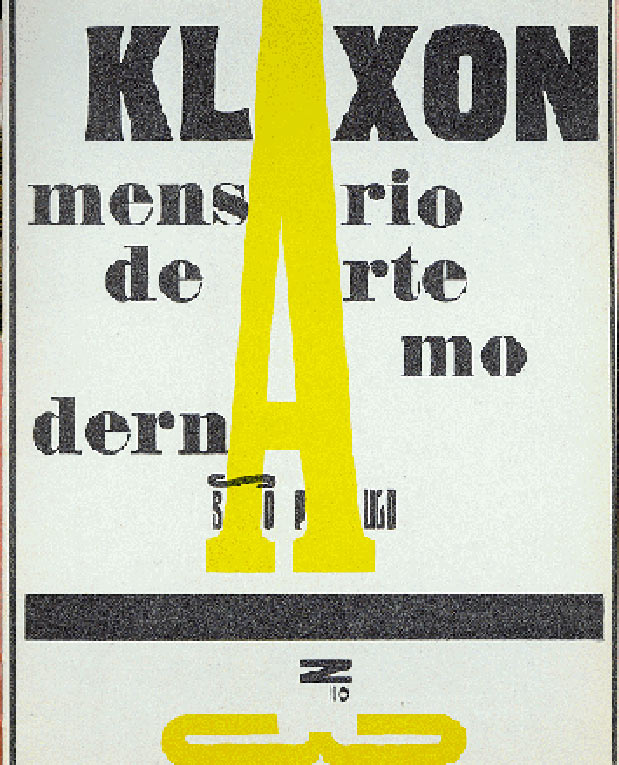
Klaxon magazine cover.

==== Klaxon magazine (1922–1923) ====
It was published in São Paulo from May 15, 1922, to January 1923. It was the first Brazilian modernist publication after the Modern Art Week and its main purpose was to publicize the movement;

==== Manifesto Pau-Brasil (1924–1925) ====
It was written by Oswald de Andrade, first published in Correio da Manhã and reprinted in 1924 as the opening of the poetry book Pau-Brasil. He presented a proposal for literature linked to Brazilian reality, based on a rediscovery of the country, and stated that Brazilian art should be an "export", just like Brazilwood;

==== Movimento Verde-Amarelo (1926–1929) ====
A group formed by Plínio Salgado, Menotti del Picchia, Guilherme de Almeida and Cassiano Ricardo in response to the Manifesto Pau-Brasil to criticize Oswald's "French nationalism". His proposal was a primitivist nationalism, ufanistic and identified with European nationalist regimes, which evolved into Integralism. In May 1929, the Verde-Amarelo group published the Manifesto Nhengaçu Verde-Amarelo, also called the Manifesto of Verde-Amarelismo or Manifesto of the Escola da Anta.

==== Manifesto Regionalista of 1926 ====
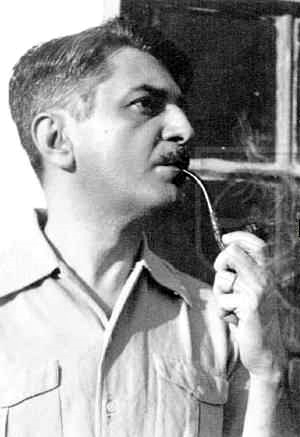
Gilberto Freyre.

The period from 1925 to 1930 was characterized by the dissemination of Modernism throughout the Brazilian states. In this context, the Regionalist Center of the Northeast, located in Recife and chaired by Gilberto Freyre, sought to develop a sense of unity in the region according to the new modernist molds, promoting conferences, art exhibitions and congresses. The document's content emphasizes the importance of restoring both national and, above all, regional and northeastern culture, highlighting its strong aspects. This appreciation of regional culture led to the emergence of new artists from the 1930s onwards, such as Graciliano Ramos, José Lins do Rego, José Américo de Almeida, Rachel de Queiroz, Jorge Amado, Érico Veríssimo and Marques Rebelo.

==== Revista de Antropofagia ====
The Anthropophagic Movement was characterized by critical assimilation ("swallowing") of European avant-gardes and cultures, with the purpose of recreating them to rediscover Brazil in its primitive authenticity. It had two phases: the first with ten issues (1928–1929), directed by Antônio Alcântara Machado and managed by Raul Bopp; and the second, published weekly in 25 issues in the newspaper Diário do Rio de Janeiro in 1929, with Geraldo Ferraz as secretary.

Initiated by Oswald's Manifesto Antropofágico, it included Antônio de Alcântara Machado, Mário de Andrade, Carlos Drummond de Andrade, as well as drawings by Tarsila do Amaral, articles in favor of the Tupi language by Plínio Salgado and poetry by Guilherme de Almeida. Its name comes from Tarsila do Amaral's painting Abaporu (meaning " the one that eats").

== Second generation (1930–1945) – the 1930s Generation ==
Extending from 1930 to 1945, the second phase of Modernism, as well as being rich in poetic work, stood out more in the production of prose, characterized by regionalism focused especially on the northeast region. The thematic universe expanded with the artists' concern for the destiny of man and his position in the world. Unlike the previous generation, it was constructive.

Both the poetry of the '22 and '30 generations were contemporary, since most of the '30 poets absorbed the '22 experiences, such as thematic freedom, a taste for updated or inventive expression, free verse and anti-academicism. In this phase, the modernist poetic language, already structured, was improved and the theme of philosophical and religious restlessness was expanded by Vinícius de Moraes, Jorge de Lima, Augusto Frederico Schmidt, Murilo Mendes, Carlos Drummond de Andrade.

Prose expanded its area of focus to include new political, social, economic, human and spiritual concerns. The joke was replaced by gravity of spirit, seriousness of soul, purpose and means. The 1930s Generation adopted a serious attitude towards the world, for whose pains they considered themselves responsible. Also characteristic of the novel of this period was the author's contact with his people and the search for the Brazilian man in different regions, which made regionalism important. A Bagaceira, by José Américo de Almeida, was the landmark of the so-called regionalist novel.

Authors such as Rachel de Queiroz, Jorge Amado, José Lins do Rego, Graciliano Ramos and José Américo de Almeida presented the problems of the Northeast and the northeastern people in their works and made the region a major symbol of the regionalist genre. Together with Érico Verissimo, Orígenes Lessa and other writers, they created a new style, completely modern and totally freed from traditional language, in which they incorporated real regional speech.

Drummond's almost joking humor was influenced by Mário and Oswald de Andrade. Cecília Meireles, Jorge de Lima and Murilo Mendes introduced a sort of spiritualism that came from Mário's book Há uma Gota de Sangue em Cada Poema (1917). The writers of the second generation also incorporated serious social issues into their works: social inequality, the cruel life of the migrants, the remnants of slavery and the coronelism based on land ownership

== Third generation (1945–1960) - the Post-Modernist (or 1945 Generation) ==
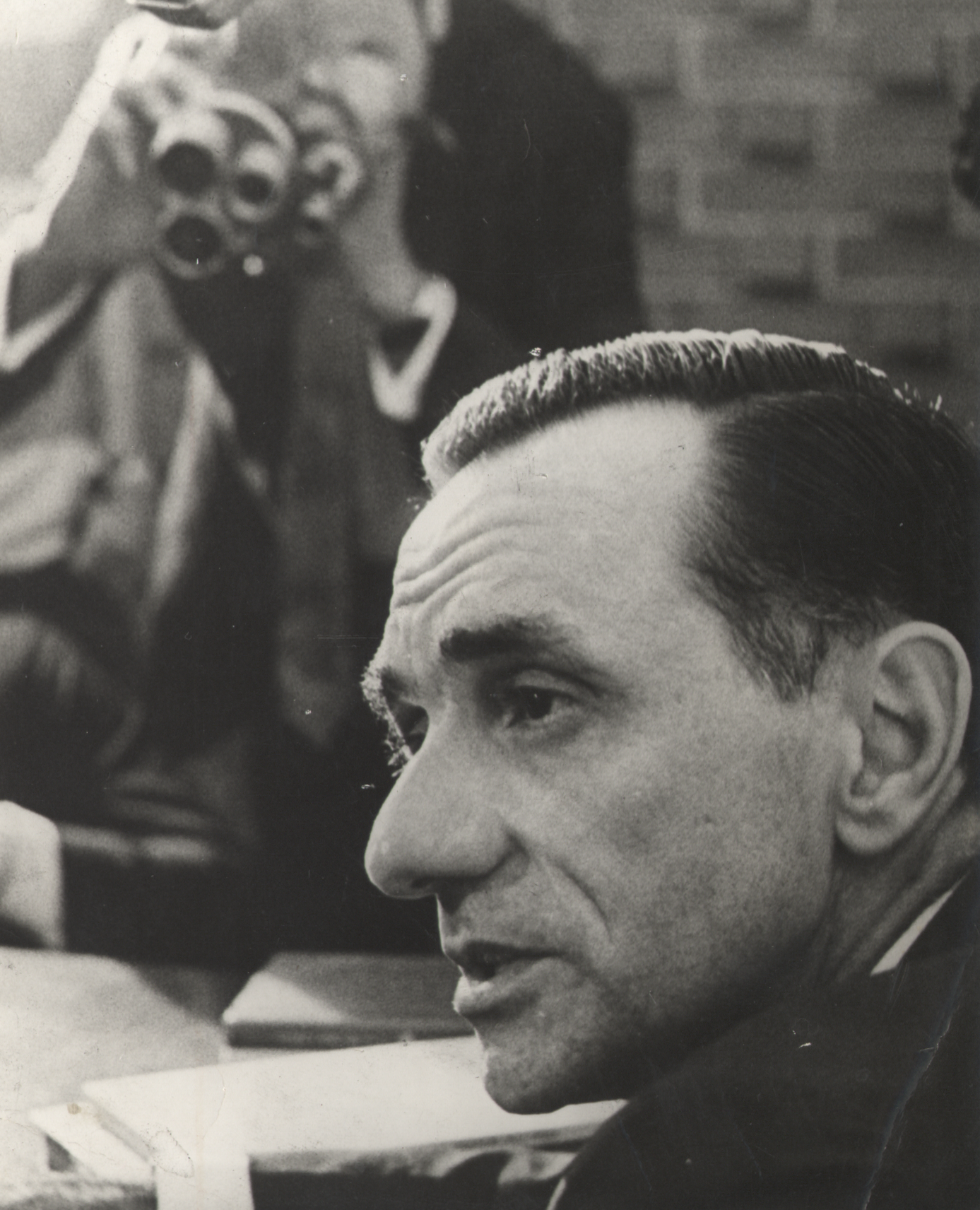
João Cabral de Melo Neto.

The transformation of Brazil's socio-political scenario also changed literature; the end of the Vargas era, the rise and fall of populism, the military dictatorship and the Cold War were all major influences on the third generation. In prose, both in novels and short stories, there was a search for intimate, psychologically and introspective literature. At the same time, regionalism acquired a new dimension with Guimarães Rosa's recreation of the customs and speech of the backlands, reaching deep into the psychology of the jagunço of Northeastern Brazil. Research into language was a characteristic feature of the authors, who were called instrumentalists.

The third generation emerged with poets opposed to the modernist innovations of 1922, which led many scholars (such as Alceu Amoroso Lima and Ivan Junqueira) to describe this group as Post-Modernist. The new proposal, initially defended by the Orpheu magazine in 1947, denied formal freedom, irony, satire and other modernist characteristics; the poets sought a more "balanced and serious" poetry. At the beginning of the 1940s, two unique poets emerged, not aesthetically affiliated to any trend: João Cabral de Melo Neto and Lêdo Ivo. They are considered by many to be the most important representatives of the 1945 Generation.

In 1948, at the 1st São Paulo Poetry Congress, Domingos Carvalho da Silva gave a lecture entitled Há uma Nova Poesia no Brasil (English: There is a New Poetry in Brazil), in which he proposed the name Geração de 45 (English: 1945 Generation) to the group of poets who emerged at the end of World War II: Lêdo Ivo, Bueno de Rivera, João Cabral de Melo Neto, Geraldo Vidigal, Péricles Eugênio da Silva Ramos and himself. Other names joined them, such as Cyro Pimentel, Geraldo Pinto Rodrigues, José Paulo Moreira da Fonseca and Geir Campos.

== See also ==
- Architecture of Brazil
- Brazilian literature
- Brazilian painting
- Before the Green Ball

== Additional reading ==
- Santos, Paula Cristina Guidelli do; Souza, Adalberto de Oliveira. "As vanguardas europeias e o modernismo brasileiro e as correspondências entre Mário de Andrade e Manuel Bandeira". CELLI. 3: 789–798.
- Téo, Marcelo Robson (2011). O tocador pelo pincel: o sonoro, o visual e a sensorialidade, do Modernismo à Era Vargas (Thesis). University of São Paulo. doi:10.11606/T.8.2012.tde-19092012-093322.
- Barbosa, Ana Mae. "Arte-Educação no Brasil". Estudos Avançados.
