= Grupo dos Cinco =

Group of painters representing Brazilian modernism in the 20s

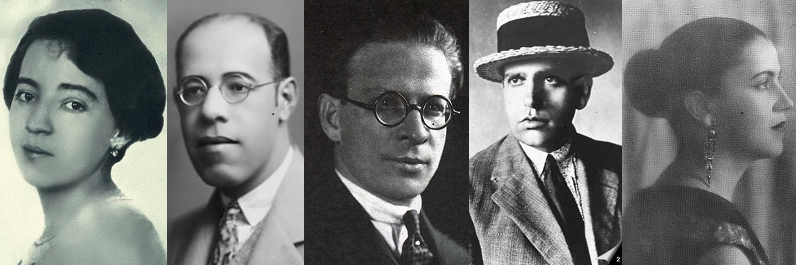
- Left to right: Anita Malfatti, Mário de Andrade, Menotti del Picchia, Oswald de Andrade and Tarsila do Amaral.

The Grupo dos Cinco (lit. 'Group of the Five') were a group of influential painters and writers associated with Brazilian Modernism. They worked together from approximately 1922–1929, although their individual work as artists and poets existed prior to this and continued after their collaboration ended. Grupo dos Cinco included Anita Malfatti, Tarsila do Amaral, Menotti Del Picchia, Oswald de Andrade and Mario de Andrade. While Malfatti and Amaral were painters, their three male counterparts were poets and writers. Grupo dos Cinco are known for their pivotal role in seeking what it is to be Brazilian as well as their work and involvement with the Semana de Arte Moderna, although Amaral did not participate. As a group, they developed ideas and manifestos that would inspire future generations of Brazilian artists such as the Pau-Brasil poetry manifesto and Antropofagia movement.

== Overview ==
In December 1917, Anita Malfatti caused a scandal with her solo exhibition Exposição de Pintura Moderna (Modern Painting Exhibition). Her use of bright colors and abstract figures could not be more in more opposition to the romantic, naturalistic paintings that conservative Brazilian culture revered. While mass reception was overwhelmingly critical, Malfatti's work attracted the attention of Brazilian intellectuals such as Oswald de Andrade and Menotti del Picchia.

Brazil was a conservative country during this time and had yet to be properly introduced to modern art styles such as Cubism, Expressionism or Fauvism that were being practiced in places such as Paris and New York. Malfatti's exhibition highlighted Brazil's conservative art views and inspired artists and intellectuals to push for modern Brazilian art.

Oswald was one such inspired figure and later became the chief organizer of the Semana de Arte Moderna- an exhibition dedicated to modern art in Brazil. Malfatti's work was featured prominently and it was here that the Grupo dos Cinco began to form ties with one another. Amaral was in Paris at the time of the exhibition, but came to Brazil three months later and met with Malfatti, Picchia and the Andrades in her studio on the Rua Vitoria. In this moment, the Grupo dos Cinco was formed and began their quest to discover Brazil. They traveled across the country, sketching and writing about their discoveries. Reflecting on these times, Amaral wrote, "We must have seemed like a bunch of lunatics shooting off everywhere in Oswald's Cadillac, deliriously happy and out to conquer the world in order to renew it".

During the group's 1922 period of intellectual debates and travels, Amaral described the Grupo dos Cinco as "inseparable". While the group stayed in contact with one another, following 1922 they were often apart. Amaral and O. Andrade, especially, traveled together around Brazil without the rest of the group. In December 1923, the pair made a trip to the towns of Minas Gerais with the Swiss poet Blaise Cendrars.

While the group never had an official disbandment, most scholars note that the start of the feud between Mario de Andrade and Oswald de Andrade signals the ending of Grupo dos Cinco's collaboration.

== Members ==
=== Anita Malfatti ===
Malfatti's 1917 exhibition caught the eye of the future members of Grupo dos Cinco and served as inspiration for the Semana de Arte Moderna that would help to officially bring the group together. Malfatti was born in São Paulo and studied art in Germany and France. In 1915, Malfatti went to study in New York where she began to develop her modernist style that would cause controversy Brazil a few years later. In fact, the criticism and backlash that Malfatti received in 1917 caused her to fall into depression. When she returned to painting, her works were more subdued and conservative. Nevertheless, she still befriended the four artistic revolutionaries of Grupo dos Cinco. Tarsila do Amaral in particular would become a close friend of Malfatti.

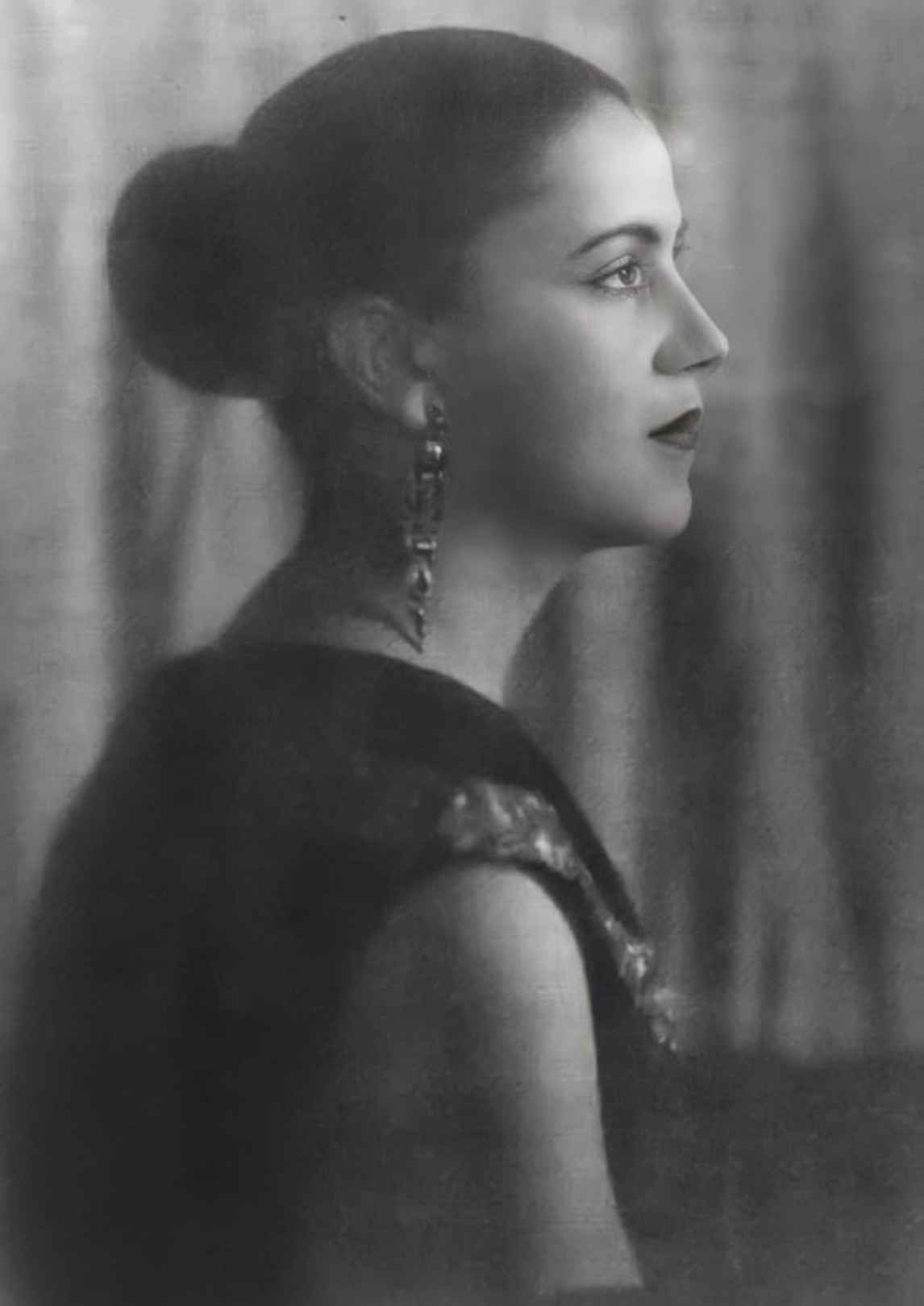
Photograph of Tarsila do Amaral, 1925

=== Tarsila do Amaral ===
"I feel myself ever more Brazilian. I want to be the painter of my country... I want, in art, to be the little country girl from São Bernardo, playing with straw dolls, like in the last picture I am working on... Don't think that this tendency is viewed negatively here. On the contrary. What they want here is that each one brings the contribution of his own country... Paris has had enough of Parisian art." - Tarsila do Amaral, letter to her family in 1923

Tarsila do Amaral is easily the most famous member of Grupo dos Cinco, affectionately referred to as "Tarsila" and often cited as the artist who officially established modern painting in Brazil. From 1916 to 1922 Tarsila was more focused on conservative European styles and received most of her art training in France and other parts of Europe. It was not until her trip back to Brazil in 1922 and her involvement with Grupo dos Cinco that she converted entirely to modernism. Tarsila is most known for her works La Negra (1923), Abaporu (1928) and Antropofagia (1929). In her travels with Oswald and Grupo dos Cinco she was inspired by the Brazilian culture she witnessed, creating a series of landscapes and urban scenes of Brazil. Along with Oswald de Andrade, Tarsila do Amaral is credited as being an inspiration for and later a participant in the Antropofagia movement.

=== Menotti Del Picchia ===
Picchia was born in São Paulo and raised in an urban lifestyle. Although most known for his poetry, Picchia has had many titles including, "landowner, industrialist, banker, political figure, as well as poet, novelist, journalist, painter, and sculptor". For his work with Grupo dos Cinco, he was primarily engaged in writing poetry and political activism. Some of his significant work includes Poemas de Amor (1927) and Republica dos Estados Unidos do Brasil (1928). These two collections differ wildly, the latter being a politically-motivated piece that shows devoted patriotism and less attention to prose.

=== Mario de Andrade ===
M. Andrade was another poet and writer who worked to establish a modern Brazil. His 1922 novel Hallucinated City is hailed as the first book of modern Brazilian poetry and effectively introduced modernist literature to the Brazilian public. He was supportive of Malfatti's 1917 exhibition, but there is little additional account of his direct work and connections with the group, although Amaral has mentioned the group's closeness multiple times, so it is fair to assume that at least at one point he was close with all of the members.

=== Oswald de Andrade ===
"We followed our way across this lengthy sea/ Until the eighth day of Easter/ We chanced upon birds/ And caught sight of the land" - Oswald de Andrade, "The History of Brazil", translated by Pero Vaz Caminha

Oswald Andrade was invaluable in bringing Grupo dos Cinco together. Not only was he one of the loudest proponents for Malfatti's 1917 controversial work, Oswald also played a large role in organizing the Semana de Arte Moderna. His Cadillac was famously used by the Grupo to travel across Brazil, while he is also the author of both the Pau-Brasil Manifesto and the Antropofagia manifesto that was inspired by Tarsila's works and subsequently inspired later painting by Tarsila. His ideas of distinctly Brazilian art and poetry had lasting effects of Brazil culture as a whole.

Poster for Semana de Arte Moderna, created by Emiliano di Calvacanti (1922)

== Semana de Arte Moderna ==
The Semana de Arte Moderna, although occurring slightly before the Grupo dos Cinco's formation, highlights the ideas and passions that the group would focus on and develop during their collaboration. It also played an essential role in bringing the five poets and artists together. The exhibition took place in February 1922 and was "an inaugural event on a symbolic level, comparable to the Armory show that had taken place in the United States nine years earlier". Primarily organized by Oswald de Andrade, the show was intent on pushing Brazil towards modernism. The conservative culture of Brazil at the time was hesitant to welcome such a change, for as shown with the scathing reception of Malfatti's earlier exhibition, Brazil was still unfamiliar with the popular "isms" of modern art. The Semana de Arte Moderna particularly focused on works from Fauvism, Expressionism, and post-Cubism- art movements that were considered bizarre when suddenly presented to a conservative Brazil.

This exhibition is best regarded not for the quality of the work it displayed, but rather for the purposefully provocative nature of the exhibition. "The real quest for Modernism in art began after the Semana de arte moderna", due largely to the formation of Grupo dos Cinco.

== Bibliography ==
- Lucie-Smith, Edward. Latin American art of the 20th century. New York: Thames and Hudson, 2003.
- Sullivan, Edward J. Brazil: body and soul. New York: Guggenheim Museum, 2001.
- Vicuña, Cecilia. The Oxford book of Latin American poetry. Oxford: Oxford University Press, 2010.
- Alessandro, Stephanie, and Luis Perez-Oramas. Tarsila Do Amaral. Inventing modern art in Brazil. New Haven: Yale University Press, 2017.
- Amaral, Tarsila Do, and Juan Manuel Bonet. Tarsila do Amaral; Madrid: Fundación Juan March, 2009.
- Lopes, Albert R., and Willis D. Jacobs. "Menotti Del Picchia and the Spirit of Brazil." Books Abroad 26, no. 3 (1952): 240–43.
