= Tupi or not Tupi, that is the question =

Brazilian phrase

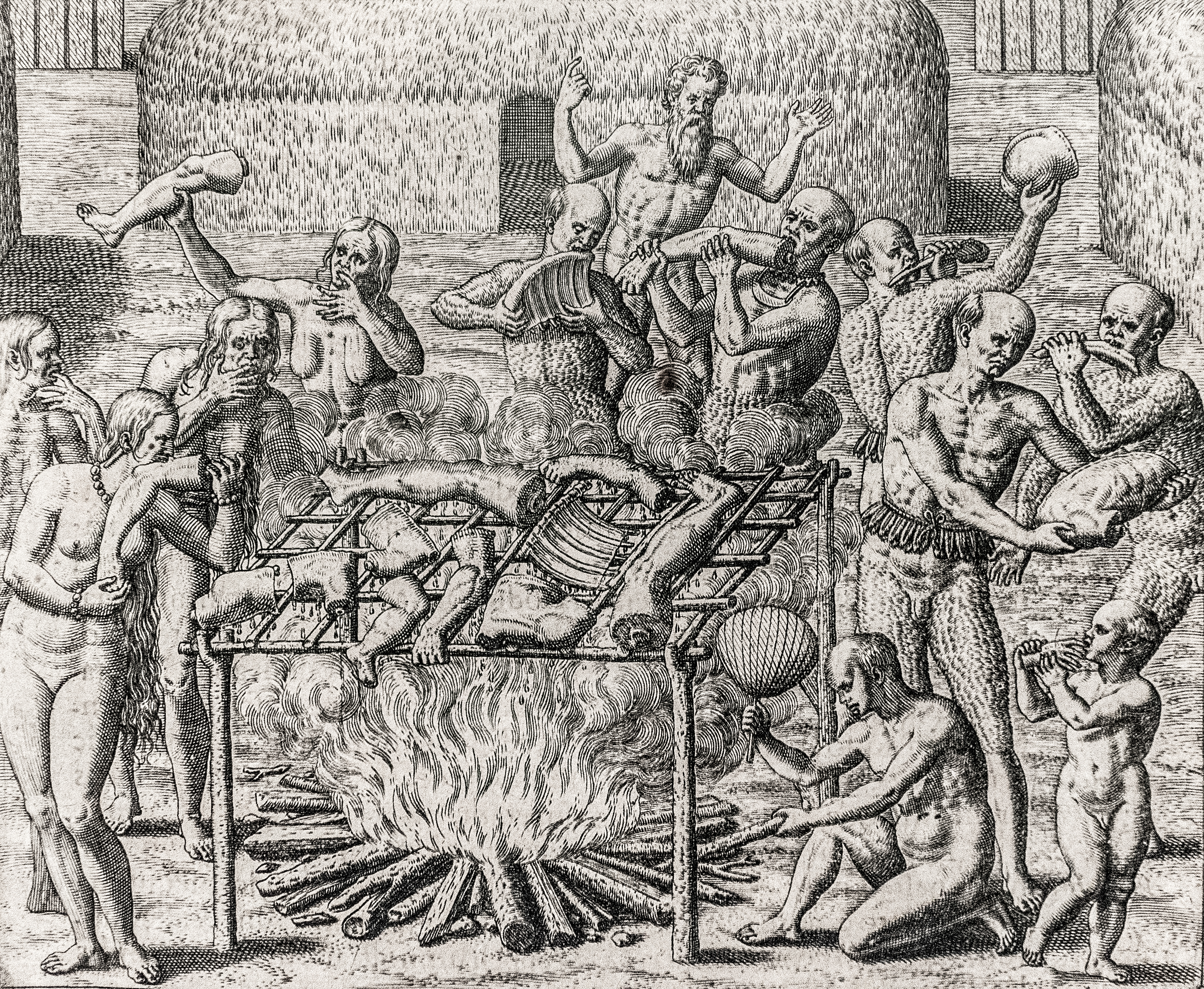
Anthropophagy in Brazil in 1557

Tupi or not Tupi, that is the question (in the original spelling, Tupy or not Tupy, that is the question) is a pun present in the Anthropophagic Manifesto launched by the group of modernist artists gathered around Oswald de Andrade, who produced the Revista de Antropofagia (in English, Anthropophagy Magazine).

It is one of the most famous and quoted aphorisms from the Anthropophagic Manifesto, published in May 1928 by Andrade in the first issue of the Revista de Antropofagia. The Anthropophagic Manifesto is illustrated by the painting Abaporu, which Andrade had received as a gift from his partner, Tarsila do Amaral. Patrícia Galvão, also known as Pagu, Andrade's companion after Amaral, was also part of the group. The manifesto was published in "Piratininga, Year 374 of the Devouring of Bishop Sardinha."

Andrade's Tupi or not Tupi, that is the question had a profound impact on the way indigenous cultures were viewed in Brazil, placing them on the agenda of the nation.

Other phrases from the Anthropophagic Manifesto have also become famous, such as the opening lines:

- "Only Anthropophagy unites us. Socially. Economically. Philosophically."
- "I am only interested in what is not mine."
- "Joy is the proof of the nine."

== See also ==
- Tupi language
