= Ribeiro Couto =

Brazilian novelist

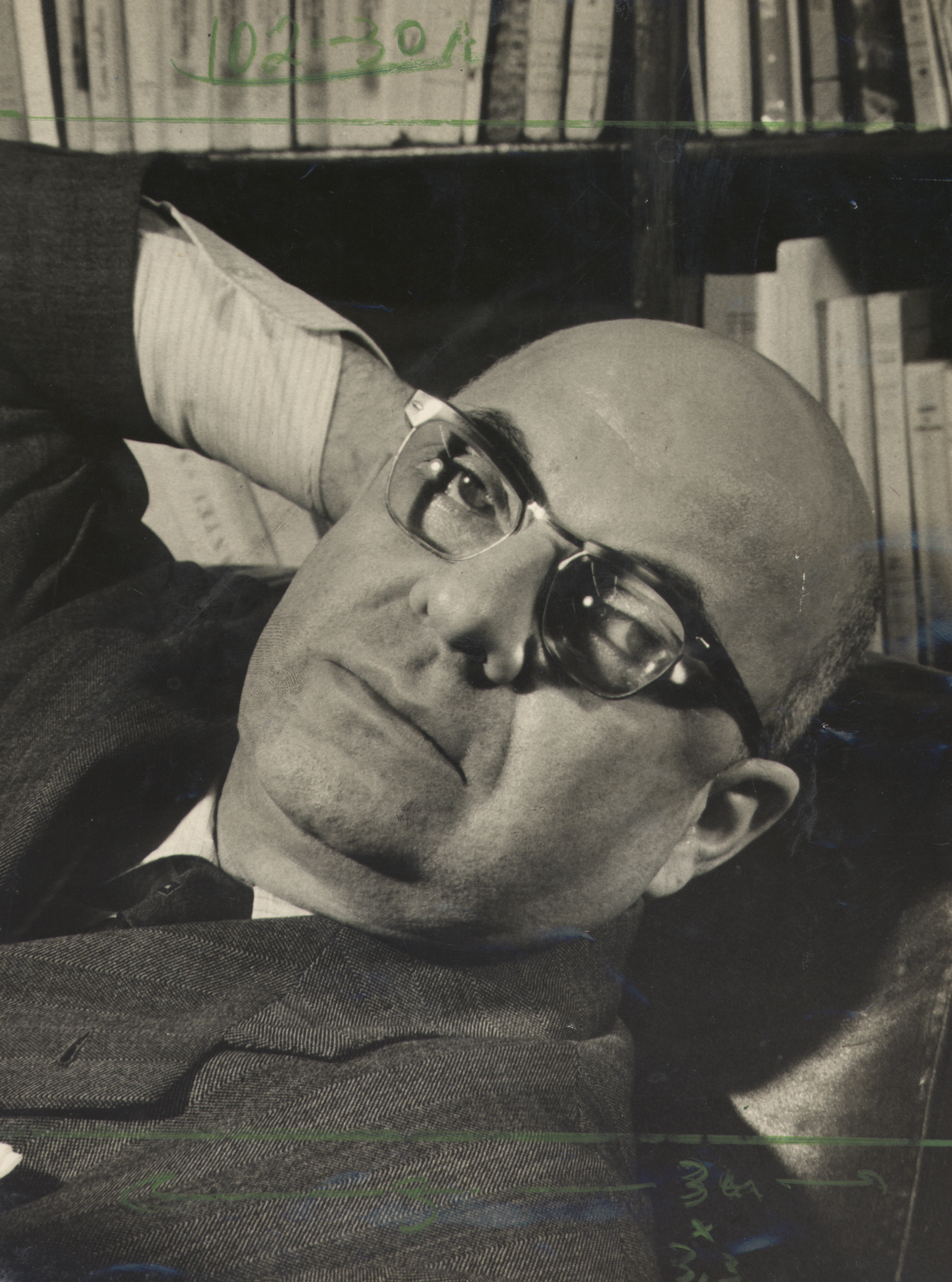
- Ribeiro Couto, circa 1963
- Born: March 12, 1898; Santos, São Paulo, Brazil
- Died: May 30, 1963 (aged 65)
- Education: Federal University of Rio de Janeiro Faculty of Law (1919)

Rui Esteves Ribeiro de Almeida Couto (March 12, 1898 – May 30, 1963) was a Brazilian poet, diplomat, novelist, magistrate, and journalist. He is best known for the 1931 novel Cabocla, which was later adapted into three telenovelas, including the 2004 version Cabocla.

== Biography ==
Born in Santos, Couto completed his education in his hometown, where he began his career in journalism. He then moved to São Paulo to enroll at the city's Faculty of Law, which he pursued while writing for Jornal do Commercio and Correio Paulistano. He transferred to the National Faculty of Law and graduated in 1919.

In 1921, he published his first book of poetry, the symbolist O jardim das confidências, with a cover designed by Di Cavalcanti, and became acquainted with the poet Manuel Bandeira, with whom he developed a lifelong friendship. The following year, he took a minor part in the 1922 Modern Art Week before moving to the interior of São Paulo, where he first worked as a police chief in São Bento do Sapucaí and later as a public prosecutor in São José do Barreiro.

The short stories from that period, published by Monteiro Lobato in two books, already contain modernist motifs, depicting the lives of common people, such as bohemian students leading nocturnal lives in Rio de Janeiro. Alceu Amoroso Lima portrayed Couto as a ''creator of ambiences, who described them with such naturalness and overwhelming emotion, that we read his stories as if we were living them'', and critics compared him to Anton Chekhov, João do Rio, and Katherine Mansfield.

Afflicted with tuberculosis since youth, Couto moved to Pouso Alto, in Minas Gerais, in search of a more agreeable climate. After his health improved, he moved to Rio de Janeiro to work at Jornal do Brasil and was subsequently appointed as honorary vice-consul by the consul Mateus de Albuquerque, working in Marseille. He was later transferred to Paris, and promoted to junior consul by Afrânio de Melo Franco.

In 1931, Couto published his novel Cabocla, the story of a convalescent student who falls in love with a cabocla girl in a small rural village. The book was widely read and discussed, and earned him a seat in the Brazilian Academy of Letters, where he was received by the philologist Laudelino Freire and succeeded the journalist Constâncio Alves. The following year, Couto joined the Brazilian Integralist Action.

As a diplomat, Couto worked in Portugal, Switzerland, and the Netherlands, and served as ambassador of Brazil to Yugoslavia for eleven years.

== Works ==
=== Poetry ===
- O jardim das confidências (1921)
- Poemetos de ternura e de melancolia (1924)
- Um homem na multidão (1926)
- Canções de amor (1930)
- Noroeste e outros poemas do Brasil (1932)
- Província (1934)
- Cancioneiro de Dom Afonso (1939)
- Cancioneiro do ausente (1943)
- Rive etrangère (1951)
- Entre mar e rio (1952)
- Le jour est long (1958)
- Poesias reunidas (1960)
- Longe (1961)

=== Prose ===
==== Short stories ====
- A casa do gato cinzento (1922)
- O crime do estudante Batista (1922)
- Baianinha e outras mulheres (1928)
- Clube das esposas enganadas (1933)
- Largo da Matriz (1940)

==== Novels ====
- Cabocla (1931)
- Prima belinha (1940)

==== Crônicas ====
- A cidade do vício e da graça (1924)
- Espírito de São Paulo (1932)
- Conversa inocente (1935)
- Barro do município (1956)

==== Essay ====
- Presença de Santa Teresinha (1934)
- Dois retratos de Manuel Bandeira (1960)
- Sentimento lusitano (1961)
