= Tarsila do Amaral: Inventing Modern Art in Brazil =

- Publisher: Art Institute of Chicago
- ISBN: 978-0-300-22861-8 (Hardcover)

Tarsila do Amaral: Inventing Modern Art in Brazil is a book about the work of the Brazilian modernist artist Tarsila do Amaral by curators Stephanie D'Alessandro and Luis Pérez-Oramas published by Yale University Press in 2017.

== Critical reception ==
The book was reviewed in "Inventando a arte moderna no Brasil" Correspondance Magazine 11 January 2018. The review credits the book as being "uma rara oportunidade para o público internacional conhecer o trabalho dessa artista singular e suas obras, que pertencem principalmente às coleções brasileiras" - "a rare opportunity for the international public to learn about the work of this singular artist and her works, which are held mainly in Brazilian collections."

In her review in Revista Hispánica Moderna, the art historian and curator Sofia Gotti describes the book as "compelling." Gotti does criticize the book because D'Allessandro and Pérez-Oramas decision to "sideline" Tarsila's harsh treatment by the Brazilian government because of the artist's links to the Communist Party and exhibitions in the Soviet Union. In her critique, Gotti argues that underemphasizing the repression that forced Tarsila to sell her estate is a missed opportunity for the book to "further complicate the artist's understanding of modernity and understanding of modernity."

== Accompanying exhibitions ==
Tarsila do Amaral: Inventing Modern Art in Brazil accompanied exhibitions at the Art Institute of Chicago and the Museum of Modern Art in New York.
