= Abaporu =

1928 painting by Tarsila do Amaral

- Artist: Tarsila do Amaral
- Year: 1928
- Medium: Oil on canvas
- Movement: Brazilian modernism (anthropophagic movement), Surrealism
- Dimensions: 85 cm × 73 cm (33 in × 29 in)
- Location: Latin American Art Museum of Buenos Aires, Buenos Aires

Abaporu (from Tupi language "abapor’u", abá (man) + poro (people) + ’u (to eat), lit. 'the man that eats people') is an oil painting on canvas by Brazilian painter Tarsila do Amaral. It is one of the main works of the anthropophagic phase of the modernist movement in Brazil. It was painted as a birthday gift to writer Oswald de Andrade, who was her husband at the time.

It is considered the most valuable painting by a Brazilian artist, having reached the value of $1.4 million, paid by Argentine collector Eduardo Costantini in an auction in 1995. It is currently displayed at the Latin American Art Museum of Buenos Aires (Spanish: Museo de Arte Latinoamericano de Buenos Aires, MALBA) in Buenos Aires, Argentina.

The subject matter – one man, the sun and a cactus – inspired Oswald de Andrade to write the Manifesto Antropófago and consequently create the Anthropophagic Movement, intended to "swallow" foreign culture and turn it into something culturally Brazilian.

== The painting ==
Tarsila described the subject of the painting as "a monstrous solitary figure, enormous feet, sitting on a green plain, the hand supporting the featherweight minuscule head. In front a cactus exploding in an absurd flower." This "monstrous" figure is, in fact, human. An unadorned, undressed, sexless, and ageless human whose anatomy has been distorted. Beginning with a huge foot and hand at the bottom of the picture, the figure slowly shrinks to a tiny head at the top.

The background of the painting suggests a natural setting. Here, earth is depicted as a simple small green mound upon which the subject sits. The vegetation is represented by a cactus at the right of the figure and a golden sun or flower which crowns the composition. The sky is a plain pale blue background.

The style of Abaporu can be traced back to the French modernists, specially Fernand Léger, who taught Tarsila in Paris in 1924. However, the closest resemblance of Abaporu can be found in the Spanish Surrealists, Pablo Picasso and Joan Miró, who also painted a figure with an oversized foot in 1924.

== History ==
It was painted in oil on canvas in January 1928 by Tarsila do Amaral (1886–1973) as a birthday gift to the writer Oswald de Andrade, her husband at the time. The name of the work was given by him and by the poet Raul Bopp, who asked Oswald upon seeing the painting: "Shall we start a movement around this painting?".

Other works by Tarsila from her anthropophagic phase include A Lua (1928), O Lago (1928), Cartão Postal (1929), and Sol Poente (1929).

The choice of colors, forms, and perspective in the work reflects Tarsila's desire to show the real Brazil. "Tarsila disembarked from the 'Massilia', a luxury ship arriving from Paris, bringing in her luggage beautiful paints, many elegant dresses and a great deal of renewal". The painting belongs to Tarsila's anthropophagic phase which, like the Pau-Brasil phase, is considered one of the most important periods in the painter's career. Influenced by Cubism, this period in the artist's career allowed her to create a visual interpretation of the structures of Brazilian society.

After Tarsila's death in 1973, the painting passed to Pietro Maria Bardi's art gallery, who sold it to the art collector Érico Stickel. In 1984 the painting was purchased by the amount of $250,000 by Raul de Souza Dantas Forbes, who then auctioned the painting at Christie's in New York City in 1995.

=== Exhibition history ===
In April 2019, the work was finally exhibited at MASP in the retrospective exhibition "Tarsila Popular".

=== Abaporu in Brazil ===
Although it is one of the symbols of Brazilian modernism, Abaporu was not present at the Semana de Arte Moderna of 1922, since the painting would only be produced in 1928. In 1922, when the event took place (11–18 February), Tarsila was in Paris in search of an artistic identity and would only return to Brazil at the end of that year.

Since Costantini acquired the canvas in 1995, it has been exhibited in Brazil several times. In 1998, it appeared in an exhibition at the Museu de Arte Moderna de São Paulo (MAM) displaying works from the Argentine entrepreneur's collection. In 2002, it was shown at FAAP in the exhibition Da Antropofagia a Brasília. In 2008, the painting participated in Tarsila Viajante at the Pinacoteca do Estado de São Paulo. Once again at FAAP, it was part of Mulheres, Artistas e Brasileiras in 2011. During the Rio de Janeiro Olympic Games in 2016, the painting was exhibited at the Museu de Arte do Rio (MAR) in the exhibition A Cor do Brasil. On 5 April 2019, it was exhibited for the first time at the Museu de Arte de São Paulo (MASP). According to the artist's great-niece, Tarsilinha do Amaral, it had been her dream for the painting to be exhibited there.

== Interpretation ==
Gonzalo Aguilar in his article "O Abaporu, de Tarsila do Amaral: saberes do pé", mentioned in Antropofagia hoje? Oswald de Andrade em cena, a book by Jorge Ruffinelli and João Cezar de Castro Rocha, interprets Abaporu as a kind of anti-human portrait, since the face is erased, the body is animal-like, yet the feet are very human and detailed. For Aguilar, the human gesturality in the painting is parodied. The man in the painting is devoid of identity, almost dehumanized.

For José Ortega y Gasset, the aim is not to paint something completely different from a man, house or mountain, but rather to paint a man who resembles a man as little as possible, a house that preserves only what is strictly necessary for us to witness its metamorphosis, a cone that miraculously emerged from what was once a mountain, as a snake emerges from its skin. For the modern artist, aesthetic pleasure arises from this triumph over the human; therefore the victory must be made concrete and the strangled victim presented in each case.

For Gilles Deleuze and Félix Guattari, in "Ano-zero Rostidade", in the book Mil Platôs: capitalismo e esquizofrenia, the face of man is a surface and a map that arises from the intersection of the axes of significance and subjectivation, which acquires the name white wall–black hole. According to the scholars, even if it is human, the head is not necessarily a face. The face is only produced when the head ceases to be part of the body, when it stops being coded by the body, when it itself stops having a multidimensional polyvalent bodily code—when the body, including the head, becomes decoded and must be overcoded by something that we will call the Face.

The inversion of the hierarchy between the face and the rest of the body in Tarsila's work subverts the valuation of Western culture in relation to the upper part of the body, especially the head, in a kind of aesthetic provocation.

Mikhail Bakhtin addresses the lower and upper bodily material in his book A cultura popular na Idade Média e no Renascimento. For him, the defining feature of grotesque realism is degradation, that is, the transfer to the material and bodily plane—the earth and the body in their indissoluble unity—of everything that is elevated, spiritual, ideal and abstract.

Another interpretation of the painting raises the issue of labor. According to Nádia Battella Gotlib, the theme appears in the representation of the figure's feet and hands, which appear disproportionately large, symbolizing the manual labor performed by a large part of the Brazilian population. Meanwhile, the head, less emphasized, represents intellectual work, relegated to a small economic and academic elite.
