= Anthropophagic movement =

20th century cultural movement in Brazil

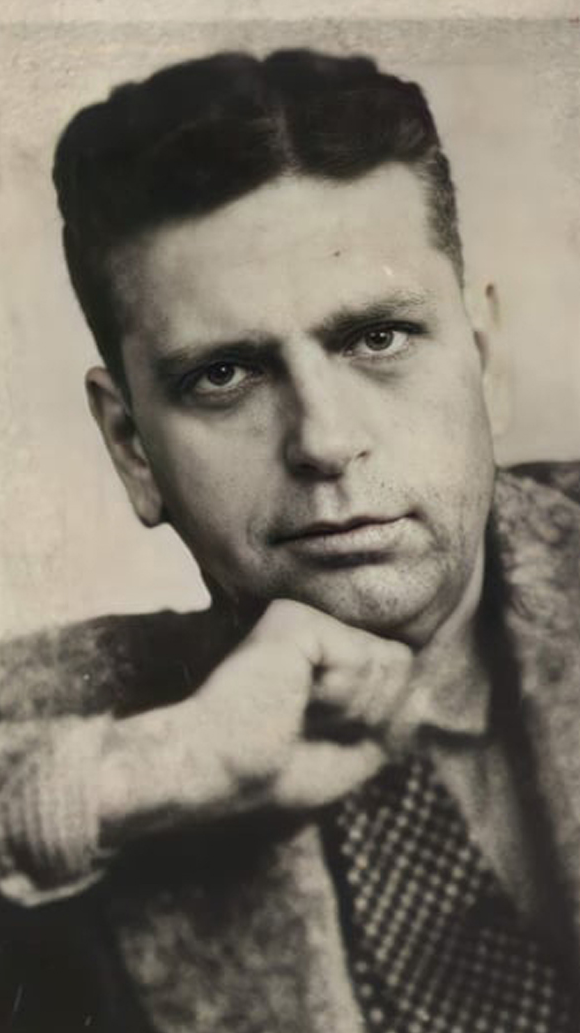
Oswald de Andrade

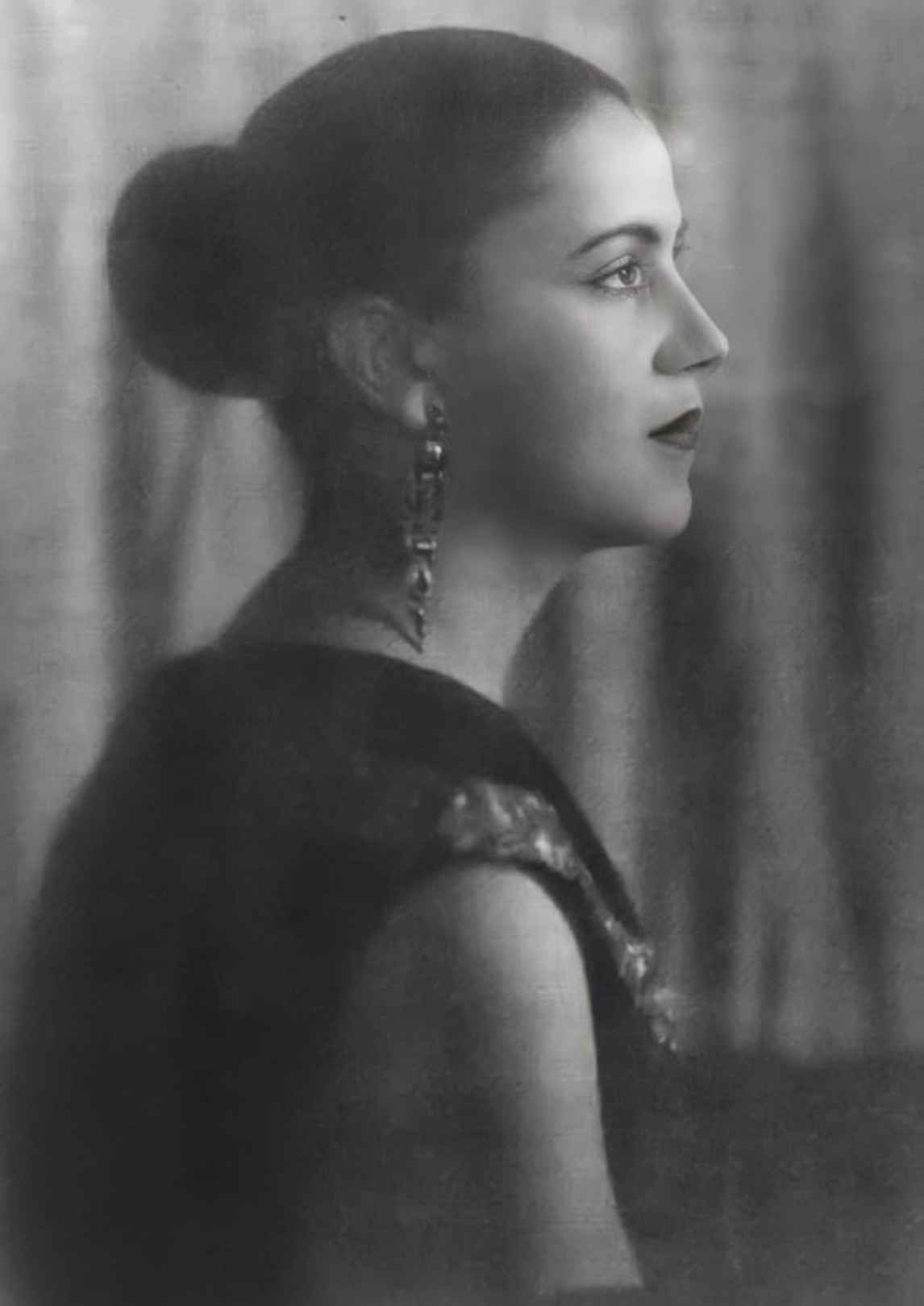
Tarsila do Amaral

The anthropophagic movement (Portuguese: Movimento antropofágico) was a Brazilian artistic manifestation of the 1920s founded and theorized by the poet Oswald de Andrade and the painter Tarsila do Amaral.

Expanding on the ideology of Poesia Pau-Brasil, also written by Oswald, which wanted to create an export poetry, the anthropophagic movement had the objective of "swallowing" (metaphorical nature of the word "anthropophagic") external cultures, such as the American and European, and internal ones, like that of the Amerindians, Afro-descendants, Euro-descendants and Asian-descendants. Overall, foreign culture should not be denied, but it should not be imitated. In his works, Oswald de Andrade ironized the Brazilian elite's submission to developed countries and proposed the "cultural absorption of imported techniques in order to elaborate them autonomously, and convert them into an export product".

== Manifesto Antropófago ==
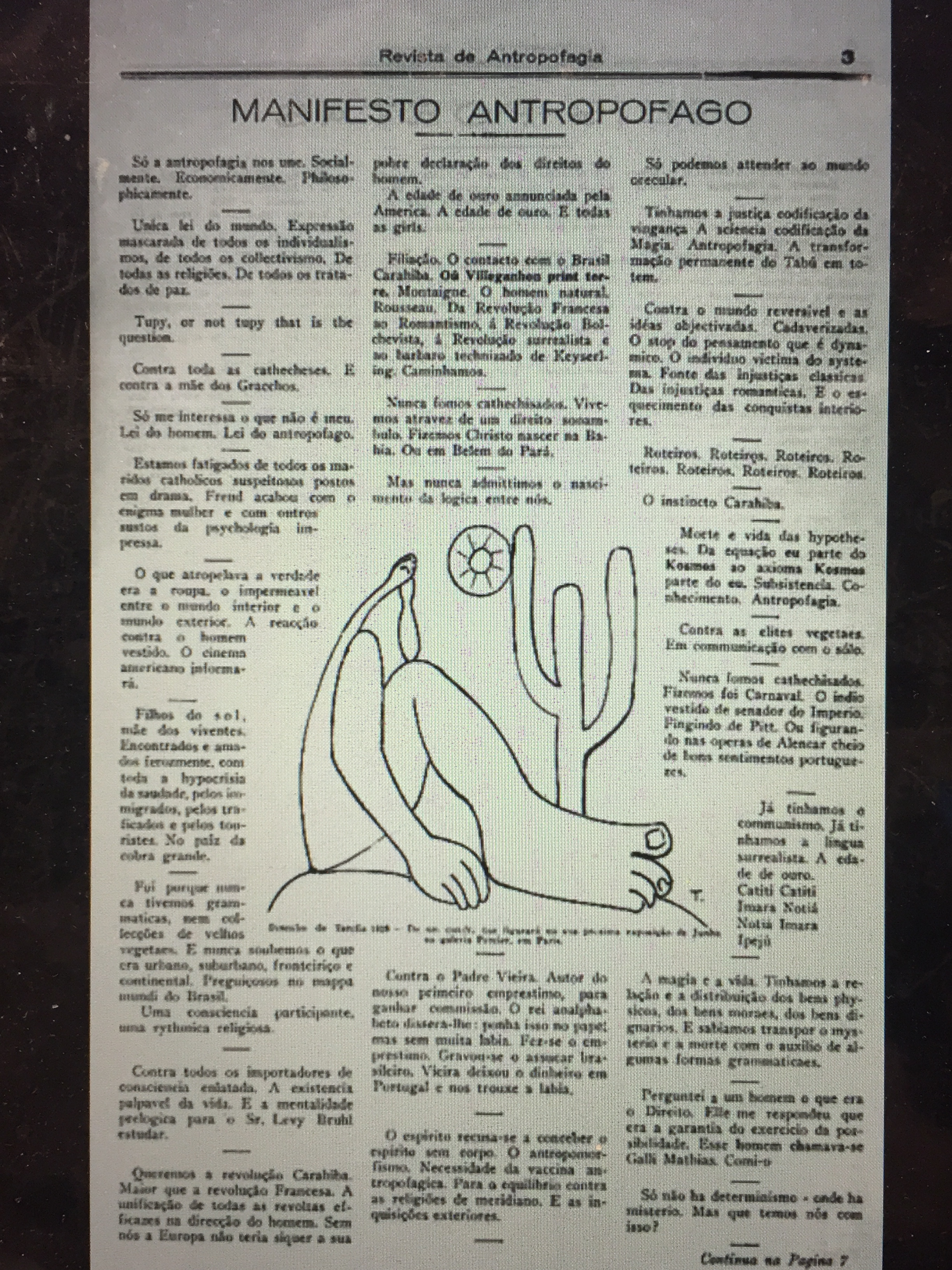
Original publication of Manifesto Antropófago in Revista de Antropofagia by Oswald de Andrade in 1928. Image at center is a contour line drawing by Brazilian artist Tarsila do Amaral of her 1928 painting Abaporu.

The Manifesto Antropófago (or Manifesto Antropofágico) was a statement published in 1928 by the Brazilian poet and polemicist Oswald de Andrade, an important figure in the cultural movement of Brazilian modernism. It was inspired by Abaporu, a painting by Tarsila do Amaral, a modernist artist and Oswald's wife. Read in 1928 to his friends at Mário de Andrade's house, it was published in the Revista de Antropofagia, which Oswald helped found with Raul Bopp and Antônio de Alcântara Machado, with the date "year 374 of the swallowing of Bishop Sardinha".

Aesthetically, Oswald's second manifesto basically reaffirmed the previous statement's values, demanding the use of a "non-catechized" "literary language". The declaration was the first formal reaction by Brazilian intellectuals in favor of an authentically national artistic production, but it failed to influence a new generation of writers, as intended.

=== Contents ===
Written in poetic prose in the modernist style of Rimbaud's A Season in Hell, the Manifesto Antropófago is more directly political than the Manifesto Pau-Brasil, created to propagate a Brazilian poetry for export. The text, while stating that Brazil's history of "cannibalizing" other cultures is its greatest strength, mentions the modernists' primitivist interest in cannibalism as a supposed tribal rite, which became a way for Brazil to assert itself against post-colonial European cultural domination.

One of the iconic lines of the Manifesto, written in English in the original, is "Tupi or not Tupi: that is the question". The line is both a celebration of the Tupis, who practiced certain forms of ritual cannibalism (as detailed in the 16th century writings of André Thévet, Hans Staden and Jean de Léry) and a metaphorical instance of cannibalism: "eat" Shakespeare. Meanwhile, some critics argue that Anthropophagy as a movement was too heterogeneous for comprehensive arguments to be derived from it and had little connection with a post-colonial cultural politics.

== Revista de Antropofagia ==
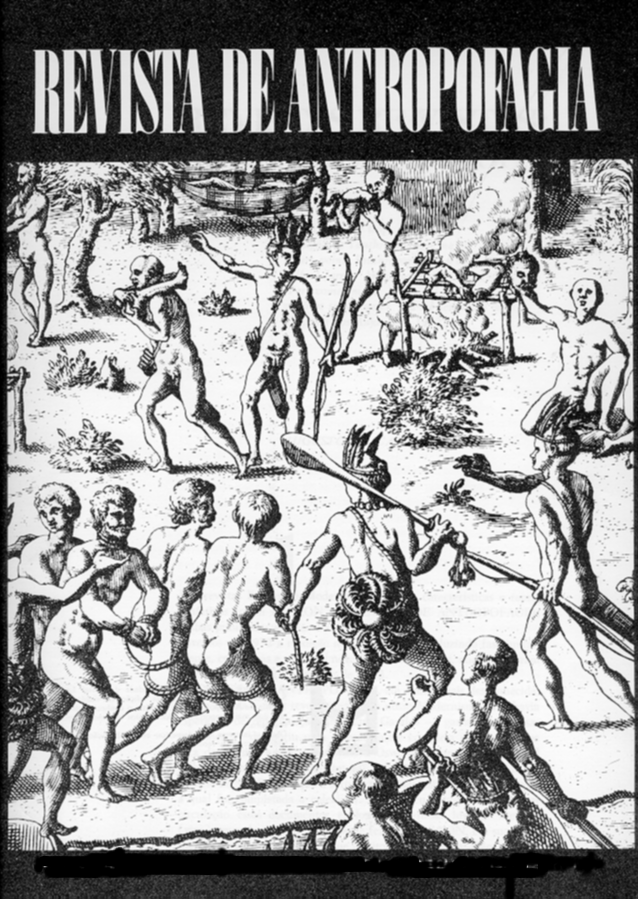
Cover of Revista de Antropofagia.

Revista de Antropofagia, a part of the anthropophagic movement that emerged as a consequence of the Manifesto Antropófago, was published between May 1928 and August 1929 and had two phases. The magazine published poetry, texts, book advertisements and criticism of some of the content of the major newspapers.

=== Issues ===
The first edition, under the direction of Alcântara Machado and Raul Bopp, had ten issues published and ran from May 1928 to February 1929. In this first phase, the main contributors were Plínio Salgado, Mário de Andrade, Jorge de Lima, Carlos Drummond de Andrade, Manuel Bandeira, Menotti del Picchia, Oswaldo Costa, Murilo Mendes, Augusto Meyer and Pedro Nava. The second edition, under the leadership of Geraldo Ferraz, had 15 issues published in the newspaper Diário de São Paulo. The first edition was released on March 17, 1929, and the last on August 1, 1929.

== Legacy ==
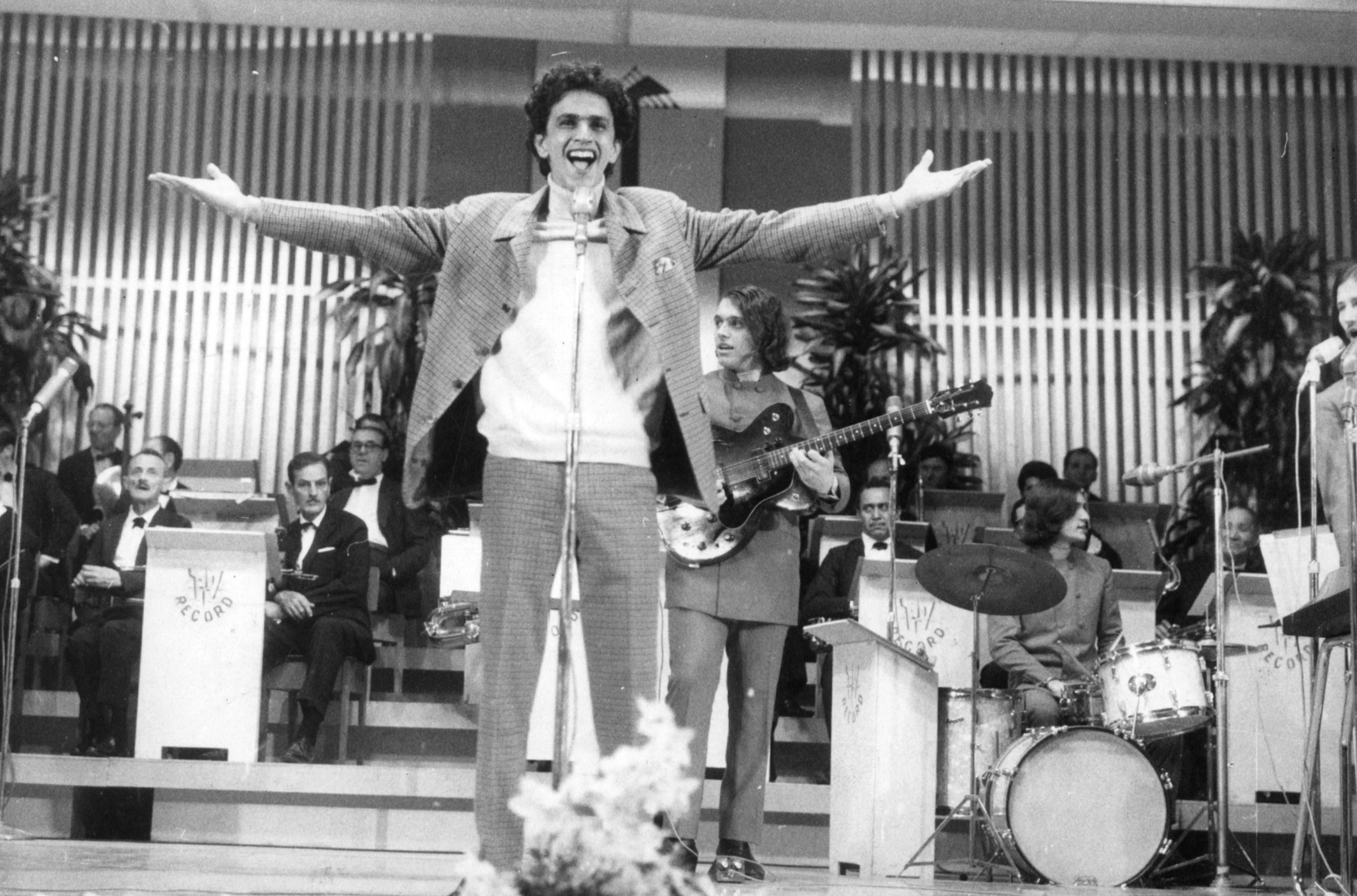
Caetano Veloso at the III Festival of Brazilian Popular Music, 1967.

In the 1960s, the artist Hélio Oiticica and the musician Caetano Veloso, introduced to Oswald de Andrade's work by the concrete poet Augusto de Campos, saw the Manifesto as a major artistic influence on the Tropicália movement. Veloso said: "The idea of cultural cannibalism fit us Tropicalists like a glove. We were 'eating' the Beatles and Jimi Hendrix." On the 1968 album Tropicalia ou Panis et Circensis, Gilberto Gil and Torquato Neto explicitly refer to the statement in the song "Geléia geral" when they sing that "alegria é a prova dos nove" (joy is the test of nine), followed by "e a tristeza é teu porto seguro" (sadness is your safe harbor).

In 1990, Brazilian artist Antonio Peticov created a mural in homage to Andrade's centenary. The work O Momento Antropofágico com Oswald de Andrade was installed at the República subway station in São Paulo and was inspired by three of Andrade's works: O Perfeito Cozinheiro das Almas deste Mundo, Manifesto Antropofágico and O Homem do Povo.

== See also ==
- Modern Art Week
- Modernism in Brazil
