= Maní =

The word Maní may refer to:

Geography:

- Maní, Yucatán, a small city in Yucatán, Mexico.
- Maní, Casanare a town and municipality in Casanare Department, Colombia.

Other:

- Maní, a character in Tupinambá mythology explaining manioc.
- Juego de maní, an Afro-Cuban martial art/dance similar to Capoeira.
- Maní, a Spanish word for peanut.
