= Tarsila do Amaral =

Brazilian painter, draftswoman and translator

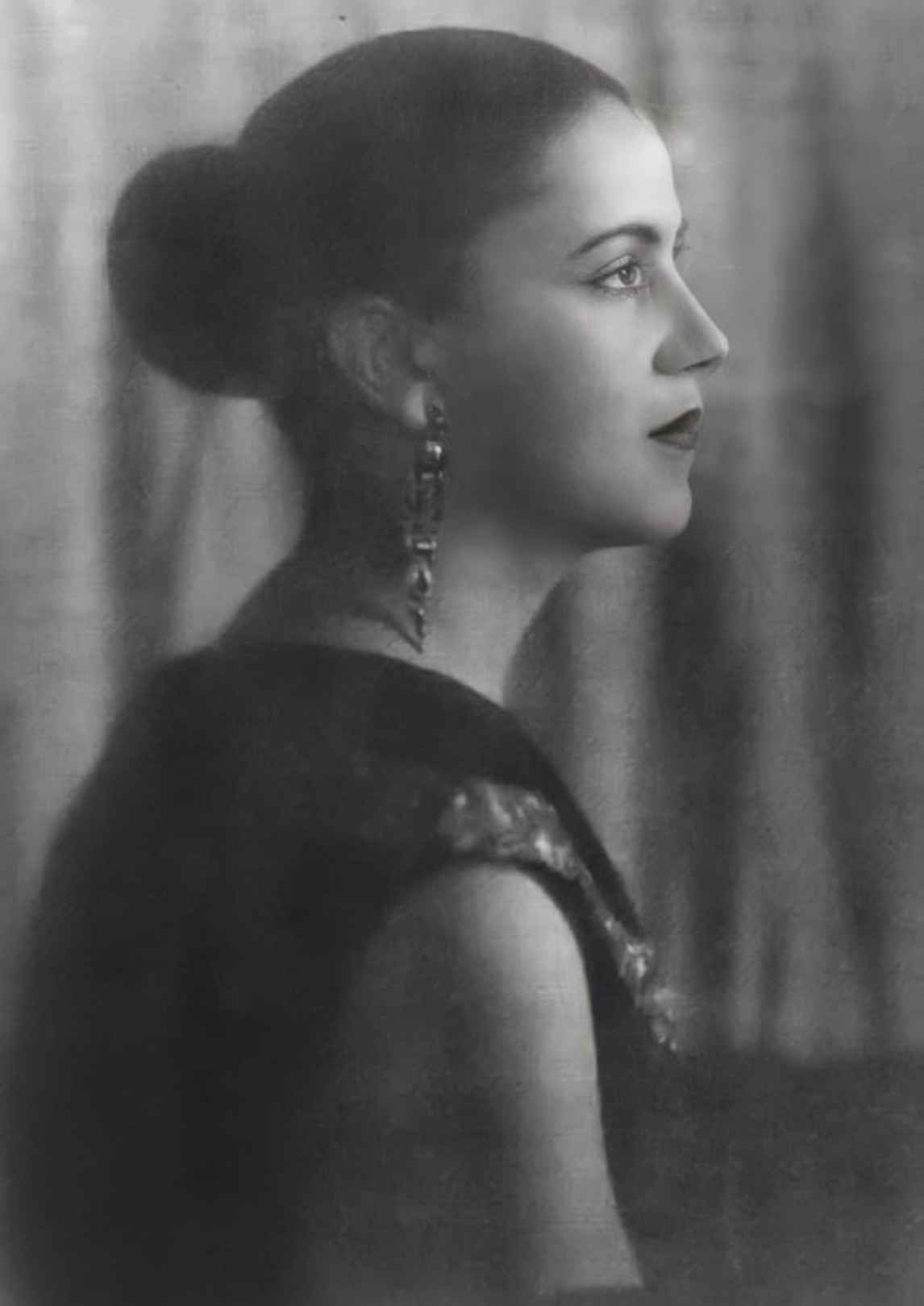
- Amaral circa 1925
- Born: 1 September 1886; Capivari (modern-day Rafard), São Paulo, Empire of Brazil
- Died: 17 January 1973 (aged 86); São Paulo, Brazil
- Resting place: Consolação Cemetery, São Paulo, Brazil
- Known for: Grupo dos Cinco; Abaporu
- Style: Modernist
- Movement: Antropofagia
- Spouses: André Teixeira Pinto (m. 1906; ann. 1925) Oswald de Andrade (m. 1926; sep. 1929)

Tarsila de Aguiar do Amaral (Portuguese pronunciation: [taʁˈsilɐ du ɐmaˈɾaw]; 1 September 1886 – 17 January 1973) was a Brazilian painter, draftswoman, and translator. She is considered one of the leading Latin American modernist artists, and is regarded as the painter who best achieved Brazilian aspirations for nationalistic expression in a modern style. As a member of the Grupo dos Cinco, Tarsila is also considered a major influence in the modern art movement in Brazil, alongside Anita Malfatti, Menotti Del Picchia, Mário de Andrade, and Oswald de Andrade. She was instrumental in the formation of the aesthetic movement, Antropofagia (1928–1929); in fact, Tarsila was the one with her celebrated painting, Abaporu, who inspired Oswald de Andrade's famous Manifesto Antropófago.

== Early life and education ==
Tarsila do Amaral was born in Capivari, a small town in the countryside of the state of São Paulo. She was born to a wealthy family of farmers and landowners who grew coffee, two years before the end of slavery in Brazil. At that time in Brazil women were not encouraged to seek higher education, especially if they came from affluent families. Despite coming from an upper class family, Tarsila had her family's support in obtaining higher education. As a teenager, Tarsila and her parents traveled to Spain, where Tarsila caught people's eyes by drawing and painting copies of the artwork she saw at her school's archives. Tarsila attended school in Barcelona, and later trained privately in her hometown under painter Pedro Alexandrino Borges (1864-1942). She also attended the Académie Julian in Paris and studied with other prominent artists (1920-1923).

== Career ==
Beginning in 1916, Tarsila do Amaral studied painting in São Paulo. Later she studied drawing and painting with the academic painter Pedro Alexandrino. These were all respected but conservative teachers. Because Sao Paulo lacked a public art museum or significant commercial gallery until after World War II, the Brazilian art world was aesthetically conservative and exposure to international trends was limited.

It is believed that around this time (1913-1920) Amaral composed a song in A minor for voice and piano named "Rondo D'Amour". The song remained unknown until November 2021, when its sheet music was discovered at her grandniece's house in Campinas. On 25 January 2022, the song was recorded at the theater of the School of Music of the Federal University of Rio Grande do Norte by three professors of the institution: pianist Durval Cesetti, soprano Elke Riedel and tenor Kaio Morais.

== Brazilian modernism ==
Returning to São Paulo from Paris in 1922, Tarsila was exposed to many things after meeting Anita Malfatti, Oswald de Andrade, Mário de Andrade, and Menotti Del Picchia. These fellow artists formed a group that was named the Grupo dos Cinco. Prior to her arrival in São Paulo from Europe, the group had organized the Semana de Arte Moderna ("Modern Art Week") during the week of February 11–18, 1922. The event was pivotal in the development of modernism in Brazil. The participants were interested in changing the conservative artistic establishment in Brazil by encouraging a distinctive mode of modern art. Tarsila was asked to join the movement and together they became the Grupo dos Cinco, which sought to promote Brazilian culture, the use of styles that were not specifically European, and the inclusion of things that were indigenous to Brazil.

During a brief return to Paris in 1929, Tarsila was exposed to Cubism, Futurism, and Expressionism while studying with André Lhote, Fernand Léger, and Albert Gleizes. European artists in general had developed a great interest in African and primitive cultures for inspiration. This led Tarsila to utilize her own country's indigenous forms while incorporating the modern styles she had studied. While in Paris at this time, she painted one of her most famous works, A Negra (1923). The principal subject matter of the painting is a large figure of a black woman with a single prominent breast. Tarsila stylized the figure and flattened the space, filling in the background with geometric forms.

Excited about her newly developed style and feeling ever more nationalistic, she wrote to her family in April 1923:

I feel myself ever more Brazilian. I want to be the painter of my country. How grateful I am for having spent all my childhood on the farm. The memories of these times have become precious for me. I want, in art, to be the little girl from São Bernardo, playing with straw dolls, like in the last picture I am working on…. Don't think that this tendency is viewed negatively here. On the contrary. What they want here is that each one brings the contribution of their own country. This explains the success of the Russian ballet, Japanese graphics and black music. Paris had had enough of Parisian art.

== Pau-Brasil period ==
Tarsila spent much of 1923 in Europe with poet Oswald de Andrade. Upon returning to Brazil in December 1923, Tarsila and Andrade then traveled throughout Brazil to find inspiration for their nationalistic art in folk religion and popular ritual. In March 1924, they spent Carnaval in Rio de Janeiro, and in April 1924, they traveled to baroque mining towns in Minas Gerais during Holy Week as part of the "caravana modernista" (modernist caravan). During this period, Tarsila made drawings of the various places they visited, which became the basis for many of her upcoming paintings. Paintings created during this period include São Paulo (1924), Morro de Favela (1924), and Lagoa Santa (1925).

She also illustrated the poetry that Andrade wrote during their travels, including his pivotal book of poems entitled Pau Brasil, published in 1924. In the manifesto of the same name, Andrade emphasized that Brazilian culture was a product of importing European culture and called artists to create works that were uniquely Brazilian in order to "export" Brazilian culture, much like the wood of the Brazil tree had become an important export to the rest of the world. In addition, he challenged artists to use a modernist approach in their art, a goal they had strived for during the Modern Art Week in São Paulo. In works by both Andrade and Tarsila, the Pau-Brasil movement was a concept that sought to establish a modern art particular to Brazil.

During this time, Tarsila's colors became more vibrant. In fact, she wrote that she had found the "colors I had adored as a child. I was later taught they were ugly and unsophisticated." Her initial painting from this period was E.C.F.B.(Estrada de Ferro Central do Brasil), (1924). Furthermore, at the time, she had an interest in industrialization and urbanization, and their impacts on society. Tarsila painted several representations of large cities, like São Paulo, that combined small aspects of the city, like gas pumps, with broader urban scenes. Building on the ideas of the earlier Pau-Brasil movement, she appropriated European styles similar to those of her former teacher, Fernand Léger, but adapted them to the local cityscapes in order to develop modes and techniques that were uniquely Brazilian.

In 1926, Tarsila married Andrade and they continued to travel throughout Europe and the Middle East. In Paris, in 1926, she had her first solo exhibition at the Galerie Percier. The paintings shown at the exhibition, which marked the culmination of her Pau Brasil period, as well as her earlier stay in Paris, included São Paulo (1924), A Negra (1923), Lagoa Santa (1925), and Morro de Favela (1924). Her works were praised and called "exotic", "original", "naïve", and "cerebral", and her use of bright colors and tropical images was commented on.

== Antropofagia period ==
Abaporu (1928), oil on canvas, 85.3 cm × 73 cm (33.6 in × 28.7 in)

While in Paris in the mid-1920s, Tarsila encountered surrealism. After returning to Brazil, Tarsila began a new period of painting where she departed from urban landscapes and scenery, and began incorporating surrealist style into her nationalistic art. This shift also coincided with a larger artistic movement in São Paulo and other parts of Brazil which focused on celebrating Brazil as the country of the big snake, as part of a broader rediscovery of Amerindian mythology and history.

Tarsila's first painting during this period was Abaporu (1928), which had been given as an untitled painting to Andrade for his birthday. The subject is a large stylized human figure with enormous feet sitting on the ground next to a cactus with a lemon-slice sun in the background. Andrade selected the eventual title, Abaporu, which is a Tupi-Guarani term for "man who eats", in collaboration with the poet Raul Bopp. This was related to the then current ideas regarding the melding of European style and influences. Soon after, Andrade wrote his Anthropophagite Manifesto, which literally called Brazilians to devour European styles, ridding themselves of all direct influences, and to create their own style and culture. Colonialism played a role in her work; Tarsila incorporated this concept into her art. Instead of being devoured by Europe, they would devour Europe themselves. Andrade used Abaporu for the cover of the manifesto as a representation of his ideals. The following year the manifesto's influence continued, Tarsila painted Antropofagia (1929), which featured the Abaporu figure together with the female figure from A Negra from 1923, as well as the Brazilian banana leaf, cactus, and again the lemon-slice sun.

In 1929, Tarsila had her first solo exhibition in Brazil at the Palace Hotel in Rio de Janeiro, and it was followed by another at the Salon Gloria in São Paulo. In 1930, she was featured in exhibitions in New York and Paris. Unfortunately, 1930 also saw the end of Tarsila and Andrade's marriage. This brought an end to their collaboration.

== Later career and death ==
In 1931, Tarsila traveled to the Soviet Union. While there, she had exhibitions of her works in Moscow at the Museum of Occidental Art, and she traveled to various other cities and museums. Upon her return to Brazil in 1932, she became involved in the São Paulo Constitutional Revolt against the dictatorship in Brazil, led by Getúlio Vargas. Along with others who were seen as leftist, she was imprisoned for a month because her travels made her appear to be a communist sympathizer.

For the remainder of her career she focused on social themes. Representative of this period is the painting Segunda Classe (1931), which has impoverished Russian men, women and children as the subject matter. She also began writing a weekly arts and culture column for the Diario de São Paulo, which continued until 1952.

In 1938, Tarsila finally settled permanently in São Paulo, where she spent the remainder of her career painting Brazilian people and landscapes. In 1950, she had an exhibition at Museum of Modern Art, São Paulo, where a reviewer called her "the most Brazilian of painters here, who represents the sun, birds, and youthful spirits of our developing country, as simple as the elements of our land and nature…". She died in São Paulo in 1973. An article written by Carol Damian in Woman's Art Journal mentions that "Tarsila's life is a mark of the warm Brazilian character and an expression of its tropical exuberance."

== Legacy ==
Besides the 230 paintings, hundreds of drawings, illustrations, prints, murals, and five sculptures, Tarsila's legacy is her effect on the direction of Latin American art. Tarsila moved modernism forward in Latin America, and developed a style unique to Brazil. Following her example, other Latin American artists were influenced to begin utilizing indigenous Brazilian subject matter, and developing their own style. The Amaral Crater on Mercury is named after her.

In 2018 MoMA opened a solo exhibition of her work, the eighth retrospective on Latin America artists following exhibitions on Diego Rivera, Cândido Portinari, Roberto Matta, Manuel Álvarez Bravo, Armando Reverón, José Clemente Orozco and Joaquín Torres García.

In August 2022 several of her paintings were recovered in Brazil from criminals who had gained them from an art dealer and collector's widow by deception and force. This included Sol poente, O sono and Pont-neuf.

== Major works ==
- An Angler, 1920s, Hermitage Museum, Saint Petersburg, Russia
- "A Negra", 1923
- Cuca, 1924, Museum of Grenoble, France
- Landscape with Bull, 1925, Private Collector
- O Ovo, 1928, Gilberto Chateaubriand, Rio de Janeiro
- Abaporu, 1928, Eduardo Constantini, MALBA, Buenos Aires
- Lake, 1928, Private Collection, Rio de Janeiro
- Antropofagia, 1929, Paulina Nemirovsky, Nemirovsky Foundation, San Pablo
- Sol poente, 1929, Private Collection, São Paulo
- Segunda Classe, 1933, Private Collection, São Paulo
- Retrato de Vera Vicente Azevedo, 1937, Museu de Arte Brasileira, São Paulo
- Purple Landscape with 3 Houses and Mountains, 1969–72, James Lisboa Escritorio de Arte, São Paulo

== Exhibitions ==
- 1922 - Salon de la Société des Artistes Français in Paris (group)
- 1926 - Galerie Percier, Paris (solo)
- 1928 - Galerie Percier, Paris (solo)
- 1929 - Palace Hotel, Rio de Janeiro (solo)
- 1929 - Salon Gloria, São Paulo (solo)
- 1930 - New York (group)
- 1930 - Paris (group)
- 1931 - Museum of Occidental Art, Moscow
- 1933 - I Salon Paulista de Bellas Artes, São Paulo (group)
- 1951 - I Bienal de São Paulo, São Paulo (group)
- 1963 - VII Bienal de São Paulo, São Paulo (group)
- 1963 - XXXII Venice Bienalle, Venice (group)
- 2005 - Woman: Metamorphosis of Modernity, Fundacion Joan Miró, Barcelona (group)
- 2005 - Brazil: Body Nostalgia, The National Museum of Modern Art, Tokyo, Japan (group)
- 2006 - Salão de 31: Diferenças em processo, National Museum of Fine Arts, Rio de Janeiro (group)
- 2006 - Brazilian Modern Drawing: 1917-1950, Museum of Modern Art, Rio de Janeiro (group)
- 2006 - Ciccillo, Museum of Contemporary Art of the University of São Paulo, São Paulo (group)
- 2007 - A Century of Brazilian Art: Collection of Gilbert Chateaubriand, Museum Oscar Niemeyer, Curitiba (group)
- 2009 - Tarsila do Amaral, Fundación Juan March, Madrid
- 2017 - Tarsila do Amaral: Inventing Modern Art in Brazil, Art Institute of Chicago, Chicago (solo)
- 2018 - Brasil: Body & Soul, The Guggenheim, New York (group)
- 2018 - Tarsila do Amaral: Inventing Modern Art in Brazil, Museum of Modern Art, New York (solo)
- 2019 - Tarsila Popular, São Paulo Museum of Art, São Paulo (solo)

== Sources and further reading ==
- Congdon, K. G., & Hallmark, K. K. (2002). Artists from Latin American cultures: a biographical dictionary. Westport, Connecticut, Greenwood Press. ISBN 0-313-31544-2
- Barnitz, Jaqueline. Twentieth-Century Art of Latin America. China: University of Texas Press, 2006: 57.
- Gotlib, Nadia Batella. Tarsila do Amaral: a Modernista. São Paulo: Editora SENAC, 2000.
- Pontual, Roberto. Tarsila. Groves Dictionary of Art. Ed. Jane Turner. New York: Macmillan, 1996.
- Amaral, Aracy and Kim Mrazek Hastings. Stages in the Formation of Brazil's Cultural Profile. The Journal of Decorative and Propaganda Arts. 21 (1995): 8-25.
- Fundación Juan March. Tarsila do Amaral (Catalogue: published in English and Spanish) Madrid: Fundación Juan March (2009), 295 pp. English ISBN 978-84-7075-561-3
- D'Alessandro, Stephanie and Luis Pérez-Oramas. Tarsila do Amaral: Inventing Modern Art in Brazil. New Haven: Yale University Press, 2017. ISBN 9780300228618
- Scott, Andrea. Introducing New York to the First Brazilian Modernist. The New Yorker, 2018.
- Cardoso, Rafael. The Problem of Race in Brazilian Painting, c. 1850-1920. Art History, 2015: 18–20.
- Ebony, David. Brazil's First Art Cannibal: Tarsila Do Amaral. Yale University Press Blog, 2017.
- Jackson, Kenneth David. Three Glad Races: Primitivism and Ethnicity in Brazilian Modernist Literature. Modernism/modernity 1, (1994): 89–112.
- Latin American Women Artists 1915–1995. Films Media Group, 2003.
