= Vicente do Rego Monteiro =

Brazilian artist

Vicente do Rego Monteiro (December 19, 1899 — June 5, 1970), born in Recife, was a Brazilian painter, sculptor, and poet, born to a rich family. He was part of the Semana de Arte Moderna exhibition and helped form the later Brazilian Modernism.

== Biography ==
Vicente do Rego Monteiro was part of a rich Pernambuco family in Recife. His mother was a professor and his father a businessman. He was born December 19, 1899. He was known for being a Brazilian painter, poet and sculptor, by 1911 he went to Paris, in company of his older sister. He attended a course, for little time, at the Académie Julian, as well as the academies Colarossi and the Grande Chaumiére. At those academies he established close friendships with Parisian Modernists. With precocious talent, in 1913 and 1914 he showed his art for the first time by participating in the Hall of the Independent Artists (Salon des Indépendants), in the French capital. He returned to Brazil in 1917, and established himself in Rio de Janeiro and Recife. In Rio de Janeiro he sculpted a bust of Rui Barbosa and a maquette for the heroes of the 1817 revolution monument. The following year Rego Monteiro worked on a drawing series inspired by the dancer Pavlova and created a ballet of indigenous legends of Brazil. Two years later, in Recife, he did his first individual sample, presenting in 1920 and 1921 in Rio de Janeiro, in São Paulo and Recife. Eventually he settled in Recife after a heart attack.

== Artistic career ==
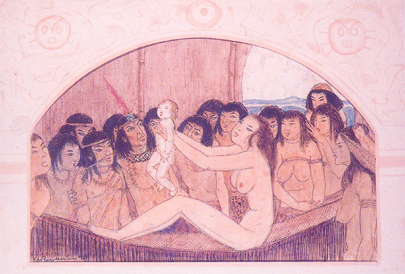
1921 Watercolor Maní Oca, the birth of Maní, by Vicente do Rego Monteiro.

He created a large impact on the Brazilian avant-garde movements, especially after he participated in the 1922 Semana da Arte Moderna in São Paulo which ignited new trends in the Brazilian Modernism movement. From 1922 to 1930 Vicente do Rego Monteiro was associated with Léonce Rosenberg's Galérie de l'effort Moderne, showing in a variety of solo exhibitions.

He illustrated two books depicting modern art centered on the regional culture of Brazilian natives and their traditions; one in 1923: Legendes, croyances et talismans des Indiens de l'Amazone and one in 1925: Quelques Visages de Paris. In Vittel, Rego Monteiro focused on religious themes, influenced by Fernand Léger. There was a fire at his studio that destroyed some of his works, but afterwards in 1928, Amédée Ozenfant suggested Rego Monteiro do a second solo show at the Galerie Bernheim Jeune.

He then went back to Paris until 1930. In Paris he produced some of his best art that was known for its tension between universal and vernacular as well as how it appropriated Cubist effects. He would portray legends, talisman, and beliefs of the Amazon River Indians, these themes stayed in his works for the rest of his life. He also challenged in his art the way Parisian artists portrayed Indians as "noble savages" when they have been the revered symbol of Brazilian republicanism.

Rego Monteiro was committed to a native and cosmopolitan approach. He lived and work in busy Paris but drew from the native people of Brazil.. He was supported by Maison de L’Amerique Latine and Revue de L’Amerique Latine while in Paris, along with Pedro Figari, Joaquίn Torres-Garcίa and a few other artists.

== Later life ==
In 1930, Rego Monteiro started participating in car races while promoting exhibitions of French art in Brazil. Three years later he returned home to Pernambuco, created an industry of sugarcane schnapps, taught for a while in his home town, becoming the director in 1938 of the Prensa del estado (State Press), then a year later established his own publishing house called Renovacão, which lasted from 1939 to 1942. The goal of the publishing house was proletarian education after Getύlio Vargas's Estado Novo. In 1941 Rego Monteiro published his pocket poems, most of which inspired the Concrete poetry in the next decade. He then went back to Paris where he published Calligrammes and designed covers for La Presse à Bras, then, after being weakened by a heart attack in 1955, he went back to Brazil and spent the rest of his life teaching at the Instituto Central de Arte da Universidade de Brasίlia.

== Artistic Movements and Meaning ==
Modernism was first found in writer's and poets' works such as Oswald de Andrade and Mário de Andrade, who also were a part of organizing the Semana de Arte Monderna. It started due to the transforming of São Paulo into the new urban cultural center. São Paulo was rapidly changing, the elite traveled often to Europe and would bring back the latest aesthetic ideas and contemporary art, which spread widely in a short amount of time. Anita Malfatti's art was the final push to put Brazilian Modernism into full swing.

Vicente do Rego Monteiro's art was known for its identity based nature. His works focused on showing the true identity of Brazilians and used the natives as way to illustrate it. Rego Monteiro was part of an artist group that focused was centered on modernism using pre-colonization native roots and the regional cultural traditions and stories. The Semana de Arte Moderna was the turning point for Early Brazilian modernism, and from that exhibition sprang Pau-Brazil and Antropofagia.

Pau-Brazil was the movement where artists tried to create a uniquely Brazilian art and unique as their paubrasilia wood. There Brazilian art became and showed Brazilian identity that they themselves would export similar to their wood. Soon came Antropofagia, meaning cannibalize. For centuries other countries had been 'consuming' Brazil either by taking their culture for their own art or using the people for one's own work. Brazil artists wanted to take back their culture and have their turn 'consuming' other cultures. Artists would go to Europe learn they could and wanted to learn then go back to Brazil to use their knew knowledge, transforming it into their own unique Brazilian style.

Vicente do Rego Monteiro also used Japanese woodblock prints, Art Nouveau, Futurism, Art Deco, African tribal art, barroco mineiro, and indigenous motifs from the Island of Marajό.

== Style ==
During the early 1920s he started developing his “relief” style where is paintings looked like sculptures. They are two-dimensional and look like they are carved into the surface. A multitude of his relief paintings were of religious themes such as “A Crucifixão” (The Crucifixion), which is one of his most famous works. "A Crucifixão" and "A Descida Da Cruz" along with several of his other religious paintings feature figures that are forlorn, mourning, and crying, the color of the paintings also being very muted; which is very different from his brightly colored ceramics of indigenous. Because of their style, most of his religious-themed works are similar to Ivan Mestrović's "melancholic deco".

In his poems, Rego Monteiro was very whimsical with strong humorous undertones that mocked traditional Eurocentric travel narrative. Often he would use hieroglyphs in his poems such as Légendes, and tended to write in French, even though it would have Brazilian subject matter.

== Exhibitions and Groups ==
- Salons des Indepéndants (1913-1914)
- Independent Exhibits
  - Exhibition (1920-1921)
  - Galérie Fabre (1925)
  - Galerie Bernheim-Jeune (1928)
- Semana de Arte Moderna (1922): At the same time the Brazilian government was hosting Exposição Internacional do Centenário da Independência do Brasil (International Exposition of the Centennial of the Independence of Brazil) held at the capital Rio de Janeiro. A group of modern artists decided to put on their own exhibition in São Paulo that represented a different view of Brazilian identity. Writers such as Mário de Andrade and Oswald de Andrade and artists Anita Malfatti, Emiliano Di Cavalcanti, John Graz, Martin Ribeiro, Zina, and Vicente do Rego Monteiro participated in the Modern Art Week. They, instead of overwriting the country's past, chose to redefine and exhibit the true Brazilian identity through their arts.
- 1928 Solo show at the Galerie Bernheim Jeune
- Galérie de l'effort Moderne (1922-1930)
- Galérie Zack (1930): The first exhibition of Latin American Artists, organized by Joaquίn Torres-Garcίa.

== Artworks ==
- "A Cobra Grande manda para a sua filha a noz de tucunã" (Big Snake sends her daughter the tucunã nut)
- Presented at the Semana de Arte Moderna
  - "Negro Head" (1922)
  - "Retrato de Ronald de Carvalho" (Portrait of Ronald de Carvalho, 1921): Expressionist
  - "Cabecas de Negras" (Heads of Black Woman, 1920): Impressionist portrait of black women
  - Two Cubist works, both titled "Cubismo" (Cubism)
  - Two with Brazilian subject matters, both titled "Lenda Brasileira" (Brazilian Legend)
- "A Crucifixão" (The Crucifixion, 1922)
- "A Descida Da Cruz" (The Descent from the Cross, 1924)
- "O Urso" (the bear, 1925)
- "A cacada" (Hunting, 1923)
- "O atirador de arco" (the bowman, 1925)
- "Maternidade Indigena" (native motherhood, 1924)
- "A crucifixão" (crucifixion, 1922)
- "Pieta" (1924)
- "Seated Woman" (1924)
- "Guerreiro, vagalume, indiozinho montado" (Warrior, gloworm, and seated little Indian, 1920)
