= A Cuca =

1924 oil on canvas painting by Brazilian artist Tarsila do Amaral

A Cuca (1924), oil on canvas, 60.5 cm × 72.5 cm (23.8 in × 28.5 in)

A Cuca is an oil on canvas painting of a cuca by Brazilian artist Tarsila do Amaral, from 1924.

== Description ==
Its wooden frame was commissioned by the artist herself from the French decorative artist Pierre Legrain, who covered it in leather imitating snakeskin.

In the Brazilian modernist style, it shows the Cuca herself, depicted as a "strange animal", alongside a toad, an armadillo, and another "imaginary animal", amidst the luxurious vegetation of a landscape.

The artist presented it to the Salon du Franc in Paris in 1926 and it did not find a buyer at the auctions to raise money for the French state, which thus automatically recovered it. It is still in the artist's only work in a public collection. Part of the Fonds national d'art contemporain, it has been held at the Musée de Grenoble since 1928.
