= Cassiano Ricardo =

Brazilian journalist, literary critic, and poet

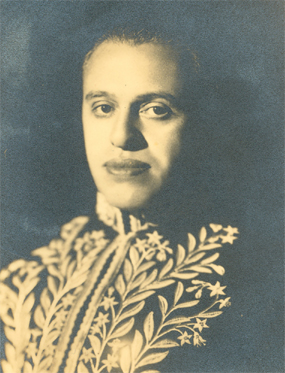
- Cassiano Ricardo in 1937
- Born: July 26, 1895; São José dos Campos, Brazil
- Died: January 14, 1974 (aged 78)
- Occupations: Journalist, literary critic, poet
- Writing career
- Genres: Concrete poetry, symbolist poetry
- Literary movement: Brazilian modernism

Cassiano Ricardo (July 26, 1895 – January 14, 1974) was a Brazilian journalist, literary critic, and poet.

An exponent of the nationalistic tendencies of Brazilian modernism, he was associated with the Green-Yellow and Anta groups of the movement before launching the Flag group, a social-democratic reaction to these groups. His work evolved into concrete poetry at the end of his career.

== Early life ==
Cassiano Ricardo was born in São José dos Campos, São Paulo in 1895.

== Career ==
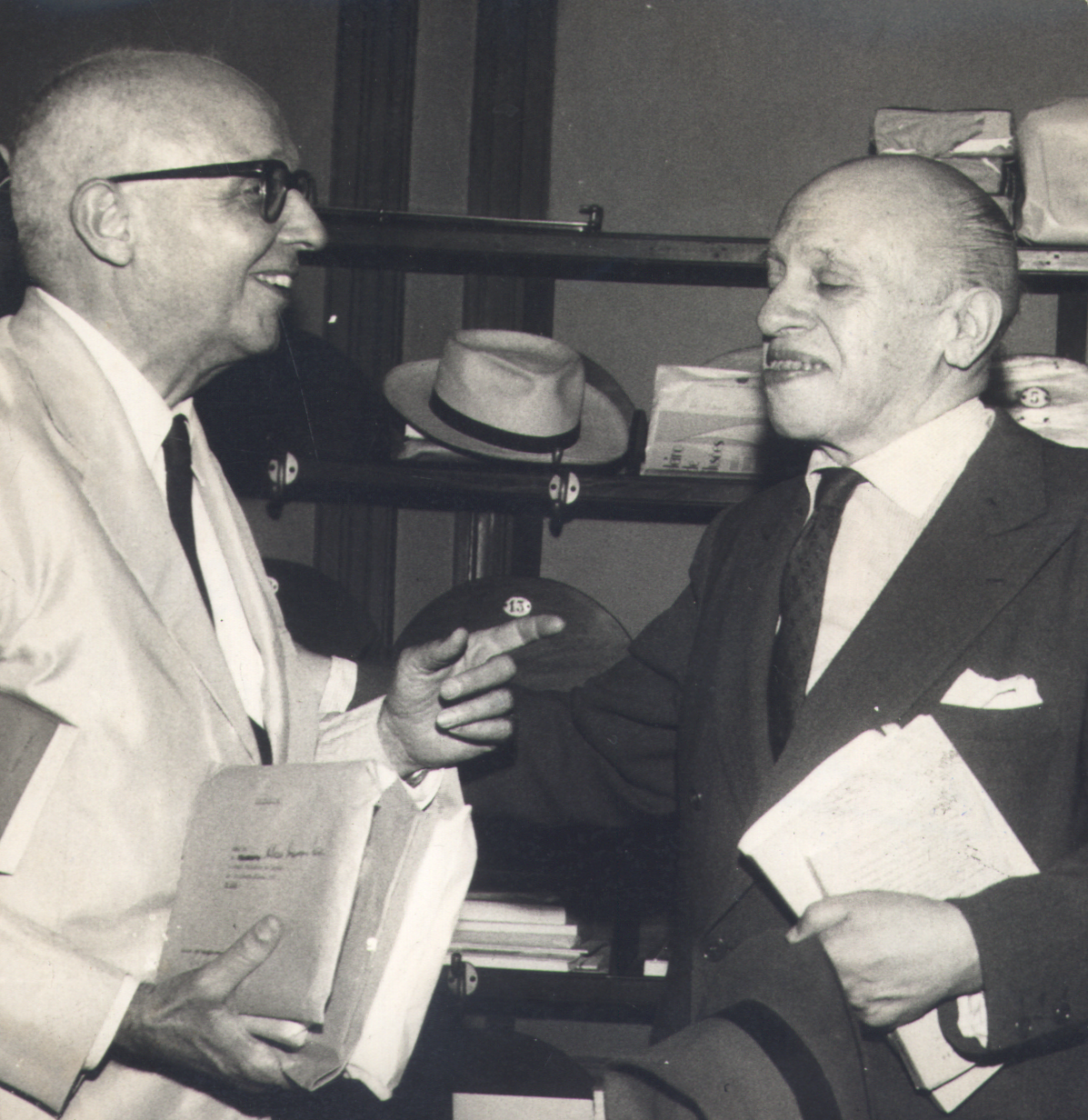
Cassiano Ricardo (right) in 1960

Ricardo, formerly a Symbolist poet, became a late adherent to Brazilian modernism and co-founded the mystical nationalist journal Novíssima. In the following year, 1926, he launched the Green-Yellow movement, with Menotti del Picchia, Cândido Motta Filho and Plínio Salgado. In 1928, he co-founded the Flag group, again with Menotti del Picchia and Cândido Motta Filho.

His 1928 book Marcha para Oeste supported the frontier for being both anti-liberal and democratic. He held a hierarchical view of such a society with the whites holding "the spirit of adventure and command".

In 1937, he was elected to the Brazilian Academy of Letters, where he campaigned for the Modernist poets to be formally recognized and appreciated.

== Bibliography ==
- Dentro da noite (1915)
- A flauta de Pã (1917)
- Jardim das Hespérides (1920)
- A mentirosa de olhos verdes (1924)
- Vamos caçar papagaios (1926)
- Borrões de verde e amarelo (1927)
- Martim Cererê (1928)
- Deixa estar, jacaré (1931)
- Canções da minha ternura (1930)
- Marcha para Oeste (1940)
- O sangue das horas (1943)
- Um dia depois do outro (1947)
- Poemas murais (1950)
- A face perdida (1950)
- O arranha-céu de vidro (1956)
- João Torto e a fábula (1956)
- Poesias completas (1957)
- Montanha russa (1960)
- A difícil manhã (1960)
- Jeremias sem-chorar (1964)
- Os sobreviventes (1971)

Preceded by Paulo Setúbal	Brazilian Academy of Letters - Occupant of the 31st chair 1937 — 1974	Succeeded by José Cândido de Carvalho
