= Paulo Setúbal =

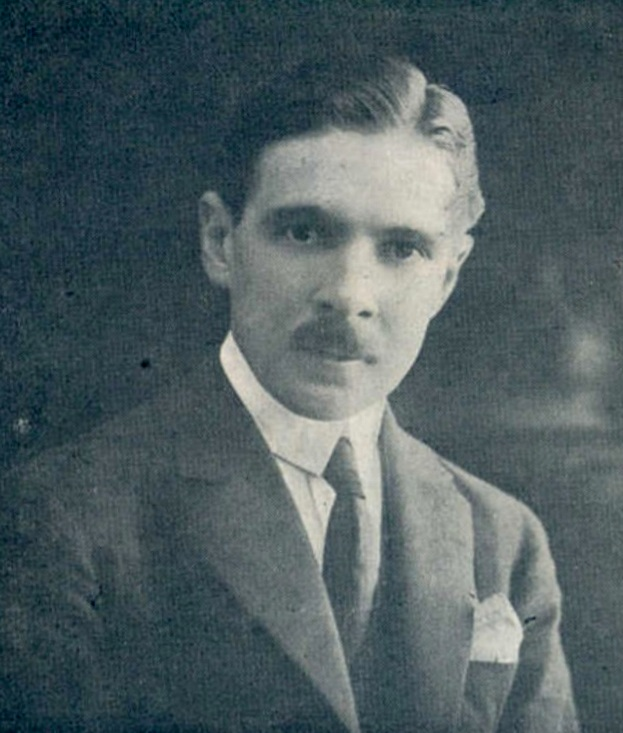
- Born: Paulo de Oliveira Leite Setúbal; 1 January 1893; Tatuí, São Paulo, Brazil
- Died: 4 May 1937 (aged 44); Rio de Janeiro City, Rio de Janeiro, Brazil
- Occupations: novelist, poet, short story writer

Paulo de Oliveira Leite Setúbal (January 1, 1893 – May 4, 1937) was a Brazilian writer, lawyer, journalist, essayist and poet.

He occupied the 31st chair of the Brazilian Academy of Letters from 1934 until his death in 1937.

Preceded by João Batista Ribeiro de Andrade Fernandes	Brazilian Academy of Letters - Occupant of the 31st chair 1934 — 1937	Succeeded by Cassiano Ricardo
