= Maní (mythology) =

Tupi origin myth

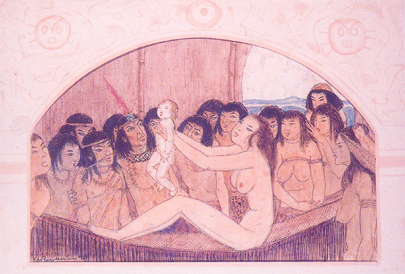
1921 Watercolor Maní Oca, the birth of Maní, by Vicente do Rego Monteiro.

Maní is a Tupi mythological character depicted as a girl with very fair complexion, whose story comprises the Tupi myth of origins. The Amazonian legend of Maní is related to the cult of manioc, the native staple food that sprang from her grave.

== The legend ==
The daughter of a Tupí chief became pregnant. Her father wanted to take revenge on the man who brought shame to his family and dishonour to his pride despite her saying that she had known no man. He insisted that she revealed the name of the man and even made use of prayers, threats and finally severe punishments. As she refused to say, her father held her prisoner inside a hut and decided to kill her. So with this thought in mind the chief of the tribe went to sleep and dreamed of a white-skinned man dressed like a warrior who told him that his daughter was telling him the truth and that she had not had any contact with any man. He told him to take care of his daughter because one day she was going to bear a great gift for all his tribe.

After nine full moons she gave birth to a girl whose skin was as white as the moon and her eyes as dark as the night. That caused the surprise of not only the entire tribe, but also of the neighboring tribes who came to visit the new born child for they could not believe she was white. Happy and beautiful Maní grew up until after her first birthday, when she died unexpectedly without signs of any illness or pain. The chief was so desolate that he buried the child inside his own hut. Her mother watered her grave every single day, as it was then the custom in her tribe. One day a different kind of plant sprang up from Maní's grave, and as no one had ever seen that kind of plant, they let it grow and no one in the tribe dared touch it. They even noticed that when the birds ate the fruits of the plant, they displayed strange symptoms, as if they were drunk. Sometime later a crack opened on the earth and the people of the tribe found a fruit that resembled the white skin tone of the dead child's body. They picked up the fruit from the ground, peeled and cooked it, and for their surprise it tasted delicious. It even renewed their strength. They also prepared a drink which could easily put one to sleep. So, from this day on, they began using the root as their staple food and called it "mandioca", which in Tupi means "house (oca, in Tupi–Guarani) of Mandi= Maní".

=== Versions ===
Alternative versions for the legend exist. One says that a good spirit came down to Earth and showed the manioc to the Indians, teaching them to extract the evil spirit dwelling in it, despite failing to teach them how the plant might be reproduced. After that, one of the female Indians of the tribe, while wandering through the forest, encountered a beautiful young hunter who was no other than the manioc metamorphosed. He seduced her and a daughter was born from this union. She led the tribe to the plantation of the shrub and taught them how to reproduce it from the fine portions of the stem.

A more elaborate version by Couto de Magalhaes tells how the chief of the tribe was about to kill his daughter when a white male warrior appeared in his dream and told him not to do so because his daughter was telling him the truth, and that she really had no contact with any man. The child born to the maiden was a boy who was named Maní. At the end of a year, the child perished unexpectedly without showing signs of illness. He was buried and later a strange plant grew upon his grave. The Indians opened the grave and instead of finding the body of the child, discovered a root which they called Mani-oka (House of Mani).

Another version given by Carlos Teschauer says that the child born from the union of the chief's daughter and the white warrior not only lived long, but also taught his tribe many things. He also told them that after a year from his death they should open his grave that the greatest treasure of all, a bread-yielding root, would be then revealed to them.

== See also ==
- Albinism
- Brazilian mythology
- Hainuwele
- Tupinambá
