= Manifesto Antropófago =

Manifesto by Oswald de Andrade

- Author: Oswald de Andrade
- Language: Portuguese
- Publication date: 1928
- Publication place: Brazil

The Anthropophagic Manifesto (Portuguese: Manifesto Antropófago), also variously translated as the Cannibal Manifesto or the Cannibalist Manifesto, is an essay published in 1928 by the Brazilian poet and polemicist Oswald de Andrade, a key figure in the cultural movement of Brazilian Modernism and contributor to the publication Revista de Antropofagia. It was inspired by "Abaporu," a painting by Tarsila do Amaral, modernist artist and wife of Oswald de Andrade. The essay was translated to English in 1991 by Leslie Bary.

== Content ==
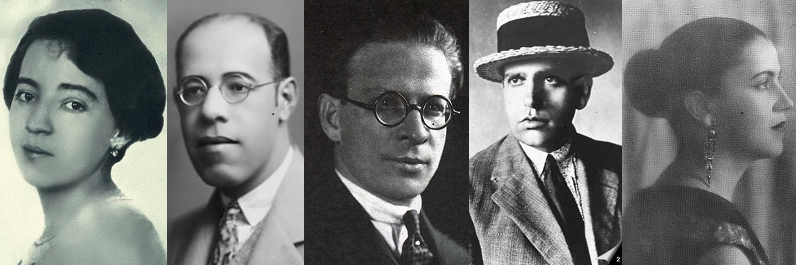
The Grupo dos Cinco, a modernist art collective that upheld the principles of the Modern Art Week of 1922.

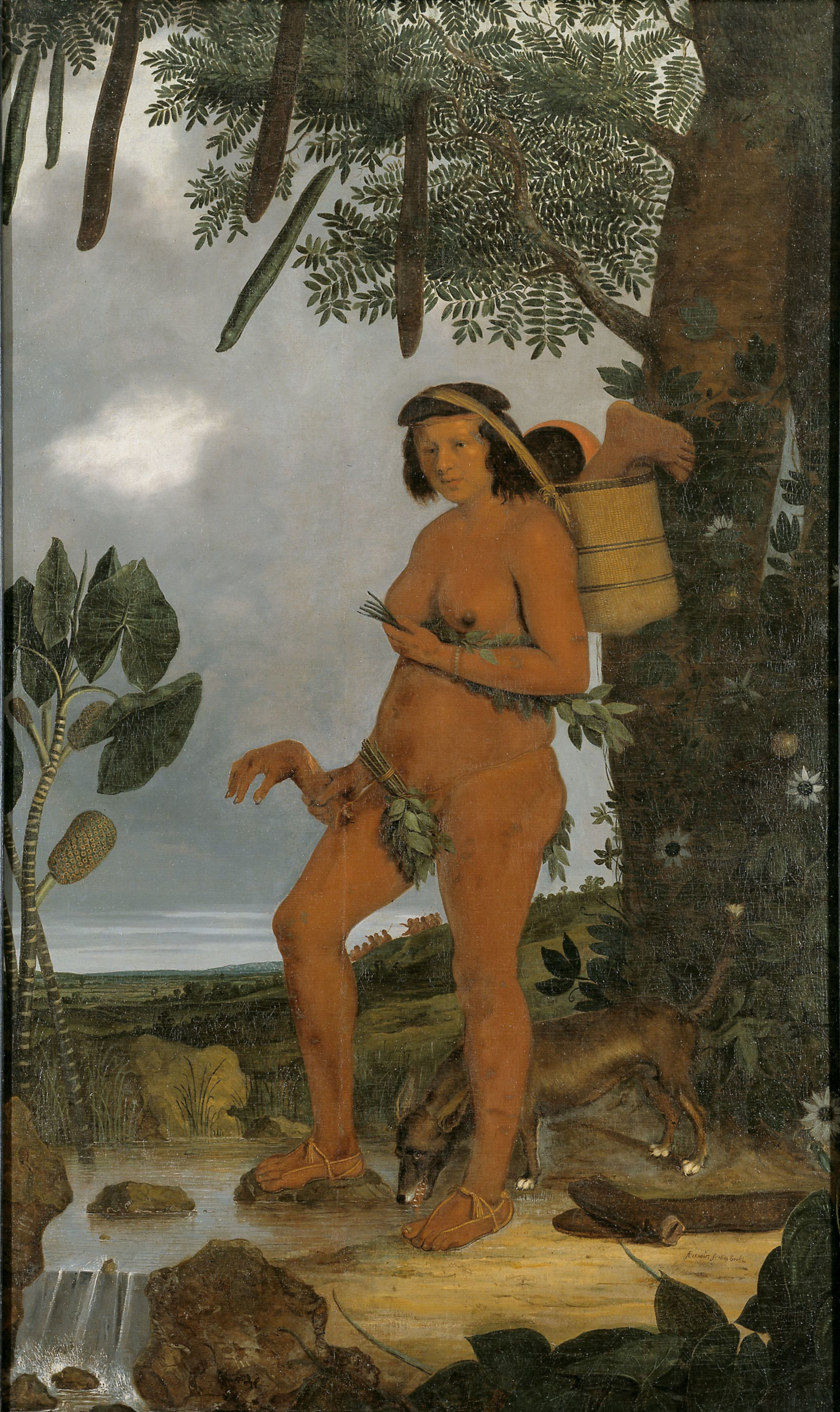
"A Tapuya woman with human body parts" by Albert Eckhout.

Written in poetic prose in the modernist style of Une Saison en Enfer by Rimbaud, the Manifesto Antropófago is more directly political than Oswald's previous manifesto, Manifesto Pau-Brasil, which was created in the interest of propagating a Brazilian poetry for export. The "Manifesto" urges Brazilian artists to take what they wanted from European culture and digest it to create a uniquely Brazilian form of art, centered in indigenous thought. Oswald de Andrade argues that Brazil's history of "cannibalizing" other cultures is its greatest strength, while playing on the modernists' primitivist interest in cannibalism as an alleged tribal rite. Cannibalism becomes a way for Brazil to assert itself against European post-colonial cultural domination.

One of the Manifesto's iconic lines, written in English in the original, is "Tupi or not Tupi, that is the question." The line is simultaneously a celebration of the Tupi, who practiced certain forms of ritual cannibalism (as detailed in the 16th century writings of André Thévet, Hans Staden, and Jean de Léry), and a metaphorical instance of cannibalism: it eats Shakespeare. On the other hand, some critics argue that the anthropophagic movement was too heterogeneous for overarching arguments to be extracted from it, and that often it had little to do with a post-colonial cultural politics.

== Influences ==
In the 1960s, introduced to the work of Oswald de Andrade by concrete poet Augusto de Campos, both visual artist Hélio Oiticica and musician Caetano Veloso saw the Manifesto as a major artistic influence on the Tropicália movement. Veloso has stated, "the idea of cultural cannibalism fit us, the tropicalists, like a glove. We were ‘eating’ the Beatles and Jimi Hendrix." On the 1968 album Tropicalia: ou Panis et Circensis, Gilberto Gil and Torquato Neto explicitly refer to the Manifesto in the song "Geléia geral" in the lyric "a alegria é a prova dos nove" (happiness is the proof of nines), which they follow with "e a tristeza é teu porto seguro" (and sadness is your safe harbor).

In 1990, Brazilian visual artist Antonio Peticov created a mural in honour of what would have been Andrade's 100th birthday. Momento Antropofágico com Oswald de Andrade was installed in the São Paulo Metro's Republica station. It was inspired by three of Andrade's works: O Perfeito Cozinheiro das Almas deste Mundo, Manifesto Antropofágico, and O Homem do Povo.

== See also ==
- Literature of Brazil
- Tropicália
