= Anita Malfatti =

Brazilian artist

Anita Catarina Malfatti
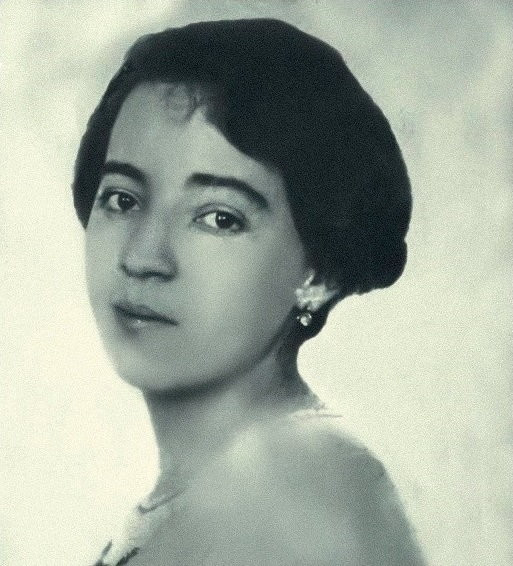
- Born: Anita Catarina Malfatti; December 2, 1889; São Paulo, Brazil
- Died: November 6, 1964 (aged 74); São Paulo, Brazil
- Notable work: The Idiot
- Movement: Modernist

Anita Catarina Malfatti (December 2, 1889 – November 6, 1964) was a Brazilian artist. She is heralded as the first one to introduce European and American forms of Modernism to Brazil. Her solo exhibition in São Paulo, in 1917–1918, was controversial at the time, and her expressionist style and subjects were revolutionary for the complacently old-fashioned art expectations of Brazilians who were searching for a national identity in art, but who were not prepared for the influences Malfatti would bring to the country. Malfatti's presence was also highly felt during the Week of Modern Art (Semana de Arte Moderna) in 1922, where she and the Group of Five made huge revolutionary changes in the structure and response to modern art in Brazil.

== Historical background ==
The cultural history of Brazil is relevant to the changing theories of art's purpose and the consequential role that Modernist artists played. There were not many art institutions in Brazil and the country lacked a long theory of art technique that was institutional in other countries such as France with the Academie Royale de Peinture et Sculpture. By the end of the nineteenth century there was dissent in Rio's National School of Fine Arts and it was threatened with closure by the Republicans who wanted anyone desiring to become an artist to have the ability to do so. This sparked somewhat of a revolution where society became more receptive to new ideas by 1890. However, people who were too tied to the emperor were left from the artistic and cultural spectrum. By the 1920s there was a desire for a more specified and formal reconsideration of the arts and São Paulo was especially prominent in this area. However, along with the desire for renovation came the equally strong loyalty to a realistic portrayal of Brazilian life and culture.

== Formal training ==
Malfatti's studies began in Mackenzie College in São Paulo, but the limited world of art in Brazil was not enough to satiate her curious mind and so she left for Berlin in 1912. Europe still remained an extremely important agent in defining artistic tendencies during this era. Hence, when Anita Malfatti went to Germany and studied with important artists Fritz Burger-Muhlfeld (1867–1927), Lovis Corinth (1858–1925) and Ernst Bischoff-Culm her influences and creative exposure were inflated. During this period she studied German Expressionism. German Expressionism emphasized the color palette and artists were expected to paint with expressive amounts of emotion that was emphasized and where subjects of the work were frequently altered or jarred. A huge influence in her artistic style lay in her exposure to the Sonderbund exhibition in Cologne from May to September 1912. At the show a conglomeration of artists exhibited their work. Although there were many post-impressionist painters exhibited, Cubism stole the show by far. Homer Boss was included in the show and Malfatti went to study with him in New York in 1915. Malfatti also studied under artists George Bridgman, Dimitri Romanoffsky (s.d.-1971), however it was her experience with Homer Boss at the Independent School of Art that was most influential. Homer Boss was a huge impact on Malfatti's style because of his comprehensive studies of the human anatomy. He stressed the idea of understanding the muscular body which helped Malfatti to hone her own technique. New York was central in celebrating Cubism and Malfatti was an exceptional student within the Independent School of Art. Thus she was exposed to European style, which by the early twentieth century was even being forged with other styles. Europe's views on Modernism included a subjective treatment toward subjects as well as a highly repellent attitude towards the artistic movements proceeding modernism such as Realism or Romanticism. Malfatti's exposure to the European world of art allowed her a glimpse into an artistic world that she could never have known in São Paulo and gave her the more global viewpoint that she would pass on to other artists as well.

== Controversial art ==
Malfatti had her own solo exhibition, Exposição de Pintura Moderna in São Paulo, Brazil from December 12, 1917, to January 11, 1918. Although Malfatti carefully chose her artworks so as not to offend—for example, she omitted her nudes from the exposition—her work was still highly criticized. In New York she had been heralded as another member of the avant-garde artists, but in Brazil her art was not recognized to be a positive contribution in the important search of nationalism and traditions within art. One of the reasons why Malfatti became such a scandal was because her art was displayed as a one-person show. Instead of having many different artists revealing their intentions of bringing Brazilian art into context of globally modernist innovations such as Post-Impressionism or Cubism to Brazil, Malfatti was seen as an individual who caused scandal to the carefully and rather conservatively minded Brazilians whose only desire was to continue the fin-du siecle romantic style. As Batista argues, Malfatti's thought was something similar to, "I'm not the only person who paints in this style unfamiliar to you; out there, this is the new, current art many others are experimenting with." However, despite the fact that Malfatti was an artist riding the global wave of thought and style, in Brazil she was simply viewed as an alien artist with no link to the Brazilian culture. Therefore, Malfatti's internationalism only further estranged her from Brazilian's expectations of art and of her art in particular.

Malfatti's art was in no way romantic. "Her formal innovations, including Cubist planar distortions, a vibrant high-colour palette and forceful drawing, were deemed unintelligible." However, Malfatti's art was celebrated by critics like Oswald de Andrade who had been familiar with Marinetti's futurist manifesto in Europe and translated that to Brazilian culture because her artwork reflected true freedom of subject and style. One of the huge factors of Brazilian modernism lay in the close association between the literary avant-garde to painting and sculpture. Lucie-Smith, in Latin American Art of the 20th Century, argues that this association prevented art from being created smoothly and progressively and furthermore provided artists with cultural, social and political responsibilities that the artists may not have been tied to. For example, Oswald de Andrade's “Pau-Brazil Poetry Manifesto” argues for:

Synthesis Balance Finished bodywork Invention Surprise A new perspective A new scale Any natural effort in this direction will be good. Pau-Brazil Poetry

With literary movements propelling the artistic explosion which was to become Brazilian modernism, Malfatti was painting in a time of political and social need for a fresh and creative artistic license. The synthesis between Andrade and other painters such as Tarsila do Amaral and the rest of the Group of Five was enormously important in replacing the older more conservative views of art and culture.

Yet another reason that Malfatti's exposition was viewed with such distaste lies in the fact that she was a woman. Malfatti's art was not seen in correlation to proper feminine etiquette of the era. She was criticized by critic Monteiro Lobato for having an inauthentic Brazilian spirit. Lucie-Smith among other art historians argue that due to the negative responses aroused toward Malfatti's art, her style never evolved further than her paintings exhibited in her 1917 exhibition. "Her later paintings are a step backwards, naïve and cheerfully folkoristic."

The Week of Modern Art in São Paulo, Brazil was created in respect to events in Europe such as Deauville, France which tended to celebrate futurism and progressive thought. Not only exhibiting art, the week included conferences, architectural exhibits, music and poetry readings. The point of the week was to celebrate the down-to-earth and free-thinking styles of art that could propagate change and social movement toward a less pretentious and more open-minded Brazilian mindset. Academic training was not stressed during the Week of Modern Art. In fact, there was an array of artistic styles exhibited, which also underlined the lack of direct organization of the exhibition. "Diverse directions were taken: from postimpressionism to half-baked cubism." Although Cubism and art deco later became a huge part of the Modernist movement, Malfatti's particular style was most influential in its initial impression to Brazil. She was a member of the Group of Five modern artists, but she is heralded more as the instigator of modernism rather than a propellant of the movement, as Tarsila do Amaral turned out to be. The artists in the Group of Five beyond Anita Malfatti were Tarsila do Amaral (1886–1973), Mário de Andrade (1893–1945), Oswald de Andrade (1890–1954) and Menotti Del Picchia (1892–1988). During the Week of Modern Art Anita Malfatti and Andrade organized classes for children in the hopes that stimulating children's interest in the spontaneity and creativity of art might help to further the modernist movement.

Malfatti's importance lies in the fact that she was the groundbreaking Brazilian painter, and furthermore an upper-class woman, who was exposed to global art's tendencies and who was able to bring these tendencies back to her Brazilian roots. In her search for her own artistic identity and her influence influenced by Modernist movements in Europe and America, her paintings accurately reflected the transformative twentieth century ideals. Although her art is never seen to transcend her initial breakthrough, that first impact was enough to impart a lasting legacy upon other Brazilian modernist painters as well as to herself.

== Evolution of painting ==
Anita Malfatti's style of painting has been criticized for not evolving artistically after her shocking reintroduction to Brazil's artistic vision. Although Lucie-Smith is quite harsh saying that none of her works after The Idiot are of any importance, it is relevant to say that her style became much more toned down and "respectable" than it had been. Malfatti's exhibition in 1917–18 was even a toned-down version of what her artistic style was. Although she did not exhibit any of her nude pieces in her exhibition her style was still seen as extremely avant-garde. Her changing style can be well explained through a comparison of pieces throughout her career. The Idiot is her most influential piece and can be compared to a piece from the 1940s, O Canal e a Ponta, a much less controversial style and subject matter.

The Idiot is her most famous example of this. Her color palette is extremely vivid and striking. Malfatti makes use of primary colors, and she outlines her subject in black which clearly defines the shape of the chair and the woman, but which leaves the background indiscernible as to exactly what it is representing. The brush-strokes are large and imperfect as well and do not lend a solid feeling of spatial organization to the painting. Instead, the woman and the background seem to exist on the same plane, only being separated by color movement and shapes. The subject of a woman seated on a chair is nothing remarkable in the art world, but the subject title of the piece as well as the striking upward glance of the woman's eyes explains how it would be shocking to a conservative Brazilian culture. Not only is Malfatti painting an (as it would seem) underbelly representation of society, but she is doing so at a time when society was searching for a "Brazilian" style. All of a sudden it becomes uncertain what Malfatti is representing of Brazil.

Malfatti almost sacrificed her artistic career to pave the path for contemporary artists such as Tarsila do Amaral in their search for Brazilian identity and culture. She is celebrated as the artist who brought Modernism to Brazil.

== Exhibitions ==
Esposição de Pintura Moderna Anita Malfatti Dec 12, 1917 – Jan 11, 1918 Semana de Arte Moderna, São Paulo, 1922 Museum of Art São Paulo Assis, 1949 São Paulo Hall of Modern Art, 1951

== Artworks ==
- Treseburg Forest, Private Collection, Treseburg (Germany), 1913
- Study for the Silly One, Museu de Arte Brasileira, São Paulo 1915–1916
- O Barco, Museum of Modern Art, Rio de Janeiro, 1915
- The Silly One, Museu de Arte Contemporânea da USP, 1916
- Picture of Man, Museu de Arte Brasileira, São Paulo
- Man of the Seven Colors, São Paulo, 1916
- The Russian Student, São Paulo Museum of Art, São Paulo, 1916
- Mildred, Private Collection, New York, 1915 or 1916
- Ritmo, Collection of Museu de Arte Contemporânea da USP, São Paulo, 1915–1916
- Tropical, Collection of Pinacoteca do Estado, São Paulo, 1916
- The Yellow Man, Collection Mario de Andrade, Instituto de Estudos Brasileiros da USP, São Paulo, 1915–1916
- The Chinese, 1921–1922
- Dora Rainha do Frevo Museu de Arte Moderna de São Paulo 1934
- Maria Antonia, Private Collection, 1937
- O Canal e a Ponte, Galeria 22, Arte Brasileira 1940s
- Vaso de Flores, Galeria 22, Arte Brasileira, 1922
- Nu, Galeria 22, Arte Brasileira, 1925
