= Luis Pérez-Oramas =

Venezuelan-American poet (born 1960)

Luis Pérez-Oramas (August 7, 1960 in Caracas) is a Venezuelan/American poet, art historian and curator. He is the author of twelve poetry books, seven recollections of essays, and numerous art exhibition catalogs. He has contributed as Op-Ed author to national newspapers in Venezuela such as El Nacional and El Universal as well as to various literary and art magazines in the U.S., Latin America and Europe.

== Early life ==
He studied Comparative Literature in Caracas at the Andrés Bello Catholic University, graduating Summa Cum Laude after writing a thesis on the Mexican poet José Gorostiza. Later he pursued his studies in Philosophy and Art History in Toulouse and Paris (France), receiving a Ph.D. from the School for Advanced Studies in the Social Sciences (EHHSS, Paris) in 1994, under the direction of Louis Marin and Hubert Damisch, after completing his doctoral dissertation on Diego Velazquez.

He was a member of Grupo Guaire, in Venezuela, and took part at the Taller Calicanto under the direction of the Venezuelan poet Antonia Palacios, thereafter successfully pursuing his literary production to critical acclaim.

== Career ==
He taught Art History at the University of Rennes 2-Upper Brittany, the Ecole Supérieure de Beaux-Arts de Nantes, and, after returning from France to his native Venezuela, at the Instituto Superior de Estudios Universitarios en Artes Plásticas Armando Reverón, Caracas. He has also taught at the Master Program in Museum Architecture and Museology at the Faculty of Architecture, Central University of Venezuela. Between 1994 and 2003 he was curator of the Patricia Phelps de Cisneros Collection, Caracas.

He has organized numerous art exhibitions in Venezuela, Brazil, Europe, and the US. In 2011 he was appointed Curatorial Director of the XXXth São Paulo Biennial, which he organized under the title The Imminence of Poetics, an edition extremely well received both nationally and internationally. He worked as a curator at The Museum of Modern Art, New York, since 2003 where he held the position of Latin American Art curator between 2006 and 2017. He currently lives and works in New York as an independent curator, art consultant and writer.

== Publications ==
=== Books – Poetry ===
- Servidumbre de luces seguido de Poesía selecta (1983-2022). Editorial Pre-textos, Valencia, 2026.
- Balada de Joey Stefano (with drawings and insertions by Matheus Chiaratti). Ikrek Editora/Quadra Galeria, São Paulo, Brazil, 2023.
- Animal vesperal. Editorial Pre-Textos, Valencia, Spain, 2022.
- La mano segadora.Selección antológica (1983–2021). Fundación La Poeteca. Caracas, Venezuela, 2022.
- La dulce astilla. Editorial Pre-Textos, Valencia, Spain, 2015.
- Prisionero del Aire. Editorial Pre-Textos, Valencia, Spain, 2008.
- Gego: Anudamientos. Fundación Gego-Sala Mendoza, Caracas, 2004.
- Gacelas y otros poemas. Editorial Goliardos, Caracas, 1999.
- Doble siesta. Sixtus, Limoges, 1994.
- La Gana Breve. Fondo editorial Pequeña Venecia, Caracas, 1992.
- Salmos y boleros de la casa. Monte Avila Editores, Caracas, 1986.
- Poemas. Editorial Arte, Caracas, 1978.

=== Books – Art History and Criticism, Social Issues ===
- La (in)actualidad de la pintura y vericuetos de la imagen. Editorial Pre-Textos, Valencia, 2021.
- Olvidar la muerte. Pensamiento del toreo desde América. Real Maestranza de Caballería de Ronda-Editorial Pre-Textos, Valencia, 2016.
- La República Baldía. Crónica de una falacia revolucionaria (1995–2014), La Hoja del Norte, Caracas, 2015.
- La cocina de Jurassic Park y otros ensayos visuales. Polar Foundation, Caracas, 1998.
- Mirar Furtivo. National Culture Council. Art and Critique Collection, Caracas, 1997.
- La década impensable y otros escritos fechados. Museo Jacobo Borges, Caracas, 1996.
- Armando Reverón. De los prodigios de la luz a los trabajos del arte. Museo de Arte Contemporáneo Sofía Imber, Caracas, 1990.

=== Catalogues (A selection) ===
- Carlito Carvalhosa. (Co-organized with Lúcia K. Stumpf). Nara Roesler Books, São Paulo, 2025
- Joaquín Torres-García. The Arcadian Modern, The Museum of Modern Art, New York, 2015
- Lygia Clark. The Abandonment of Art (Co-authored with Cornelia Butler), The Museum of Modern Art, New York, 2014
- Catalogo Trigésima Bienal de São Paulo: A Inminência das Poéticas, Fundaçao Bienal de São Paulo, São Paulo, 2012
- Tangled Alphabets, León Ferrari and Mira Schendel, The Museum of Modern Art, New York, 2009
- An Atlas of Drawings, Transforming Chronologies, The Museum of Modern Art, New York, 2006
- Armando Reverón. El lugar de los objetos, Galería de Arte Nacional, Caracas, 2001

=== Anthologies ===
Lopez Ortega A., Gomes Miguel, Saraceni G.: Rasgos Comunes. Antología de la poesía venezolana del siglo XX, Valencia: Pe-textos, 2019. Gina Saraceni: En-Obra. Antología de la poesía venezolana 1983–2008, Caracas: Equinoccio-Universidad Simón Bolívar, 2008. Enrique Andrés Ruiz: Las dos hermanas. Antología de la poesía española e hispanoamericana del siglo XX sobre pintura, Madrid: Fondo de Cultura Económica de España, 2011. Syntaxis: una aventura creadora. 30 años del nacimiento de una revista, Santa Cruz de Tenerife: TEA, 2014.

== Awards ==
Monteávila Poetry Award 1983.
