= Raul Bopp =

Brazilian poet and diplomat

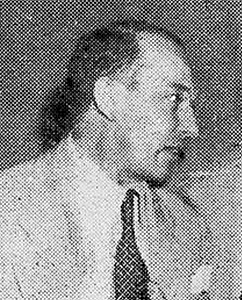
- Bopp in 1943
- Born: 4 August 1898; Santa Maria, Rio Grande do Sul, Brazil
- Died: 2 June 1984 (aged 85); Rio de Janeiro, Brazil

Raul Bopp (4 August 1898 – 2 June 1984) was a Brazilian poet and diplomat. He did diplomatic work in Japan and was a friend of Oswald de Andrade. Hence his Cobra Norato is an example of work based in the Manifesto Antropófago. In 1977 he won the Prêmio Machado de Assis.
