= Menotti Del Picchia =

Brazilian poet, journalist, and painter

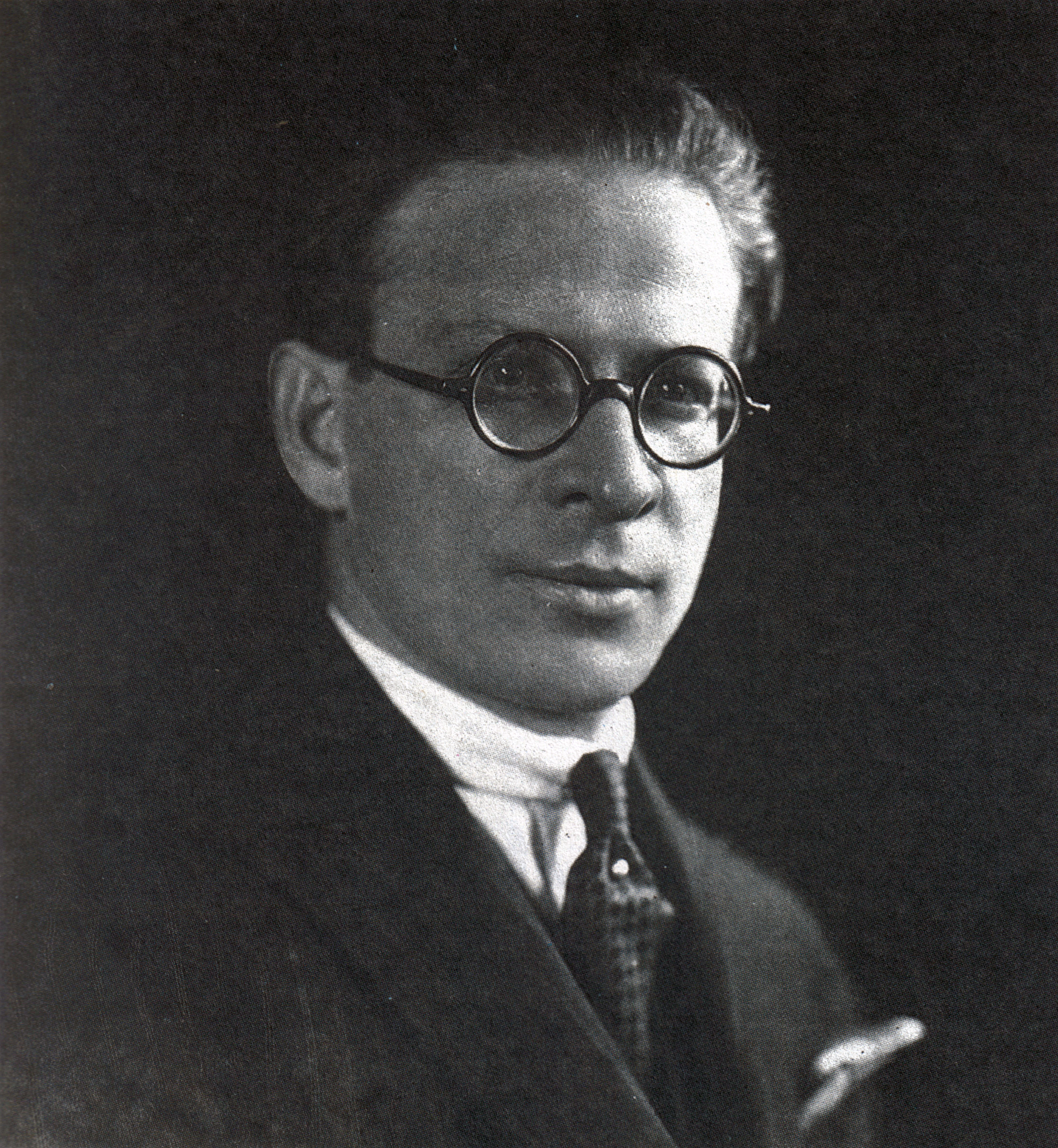
- Born: Paulo Menotti Del Picchia; 20 March 1892; São Paulo, Brazil
- Died: 23 August 1988 (aged 96); São Paulo, Brazil

Paulo Menotti Del Picchia (20 March 1892 – 23 August 1988) was a Brazilian poet, journalist, and painter who was born and died in São Paulo. He is associated with the Generation of 1922, the first generation of Brazilian modernism artists.

Del Picchia was educated in law, and was a practicing attorney in Itapira when he began writing poetry. He moved to São Paulo, his native city, and became acquainted with Mário de Andrade and the other young modernists in the city. He was a member of the Group of Five, along with Andrade, poet Oswald de Andrade, and painters Tarsila do Amaral and Anita Malfatti, and was one of the key participants of the Modern Art Week in São Paulo, in February 1922, a watershed event in the history of modernist arts in Brazil.

Because del Picchia outlived his literary generation, he received in person much more honor for his role in the creation of Modernismo than any of his youthful colleagues. By the time of his death, he had received most of the highest governmental, academic, and private honors in Brazil, and his house in Itapira is now a museum.

He occupied the 28th chair of the Brazilian Academy of Letters from 1943 until his death in 1988.

Preceded by Xavier Marques	Brazilian Academy of Letters - Occupant of the 28th chair 1943 — 1988	Succeeded by Oscar Dias Correia
