= Modern Art Week =

1922 Arts festival in São Paulo, Brazil

Cover of an exhibition catalog from the Modern Art Week, 1922

The Modern Art Week (Portuguese: Semana de Arte Moderna) was an arts festival in São Paulo, Brazil, that ran from 10 February to 17 February 1922. Historically, the Week marked the start of Brazilian Modernism; though a number of individual Brazilian artists were doing modernist work before the week, it coalesced and defined the movement and introduced it to Brazilian society at large.

The Week took place at the Municipal Theater in São Paulo, and included plastic arts exhibitions, lectures, concerts, and reading of poems. In its breadth it differed significantly from the Armory Show, with which it is often compared, but which featured only visual art. It was organized chiefly by painter Emiliano Di Cavalcanti and poet Mário de Andrade, in an attempt to bring to a head a long-running conflict between the young modernists and the cultural establishment, headed by the Brazilian Academy of Letters, which adhered strictly to academicism. The event was controversial at best and divisive at worst, with one member of the Academy, Graça Aranha, ostracized for attending. He had opened the week with a conference titled "The aesthetic emotion in modern art". Due to the radicalism (for the times) of some of their poems and music, the artists were vigorously booed and pelted by the audience, and the press and art critics in general were strong in their condemnation (such as in a famous episode by editor, writer and art critic Monteiro Lobato).

The group that took part in the Week, contrary to their initial intentions, did not remain a unified movement. A number of separate groups split off, and the original core members had separated by 1929. Two divisions predominated: the Anthropophagics (cannibalists), led by Oswald de Andrade, wanted to make use of the influence of European and American artists but freely create their own art out of the regurgitations of what they had taken from abroad (thus the term anthropophagy: they would "eat" all influences, digest it, and throw out new things). The Nationalists wanted no foreign influences, and sought a "purely Brazilian" form of art. This group was led by writer Plínio Salgado, who later became a fascist political leader (Brazilian Integralism) and was arrested by dictator Getúlio Vargas after a failed coup.

Before the events leading up to 1922, São Paulo was a prosperous but relatively culturally unimportant city. However, the Week established São Paulo as the seat of the new modernist movement, against the far more culturally conservative Rio de Janeiro.

== Participants ==
=== Painters ===
- Anita Malfatti
- Emiliano Di Cavalcanti
- Zina Aita
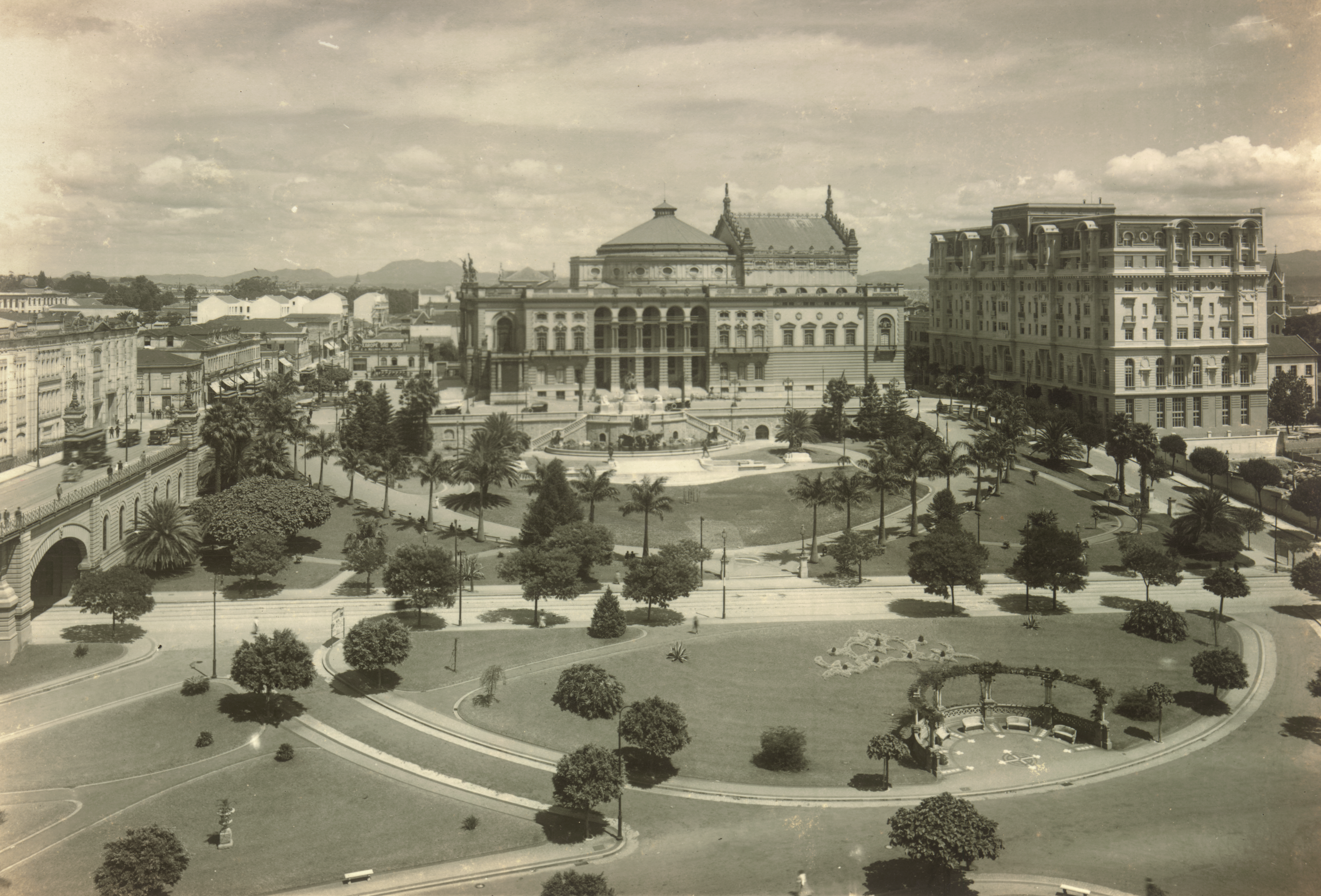
  The Municipal Theater of São Paulo, in a photo from the beginning of the 1920s.
- Vicente do Rego Monteiro
- Ferrignac (Ignácio da Costa Ferreira)
- Yan de Almeida Prado
- John Graz
- Alberto Martins Ribeiro
- Oswaldo Goeldi

=== Architects ===
- Georg Przyrembel

=== Writers ===
- Mário de Andrade
- Oswald de Andrade
- Menotti del Picchia
- Sérgio Milliet
- Plínio Salgado
- Ronald de Carvalho
- Agenor Fernandes Barbosa
- Álvaro Moreira
- Renato de Almeida
- Ribeiro Couto
- Guilherme de Almeida
- Graça Aranha

=== Composers ===
- Heitor Villa-Lobos
- Guiomar Novais
- Ernani Braga
- Frutuoso Viana

== See also ==
- Brazilian art
- Armory Show
- Before the Green Ball
