= Amazonas 1600 =

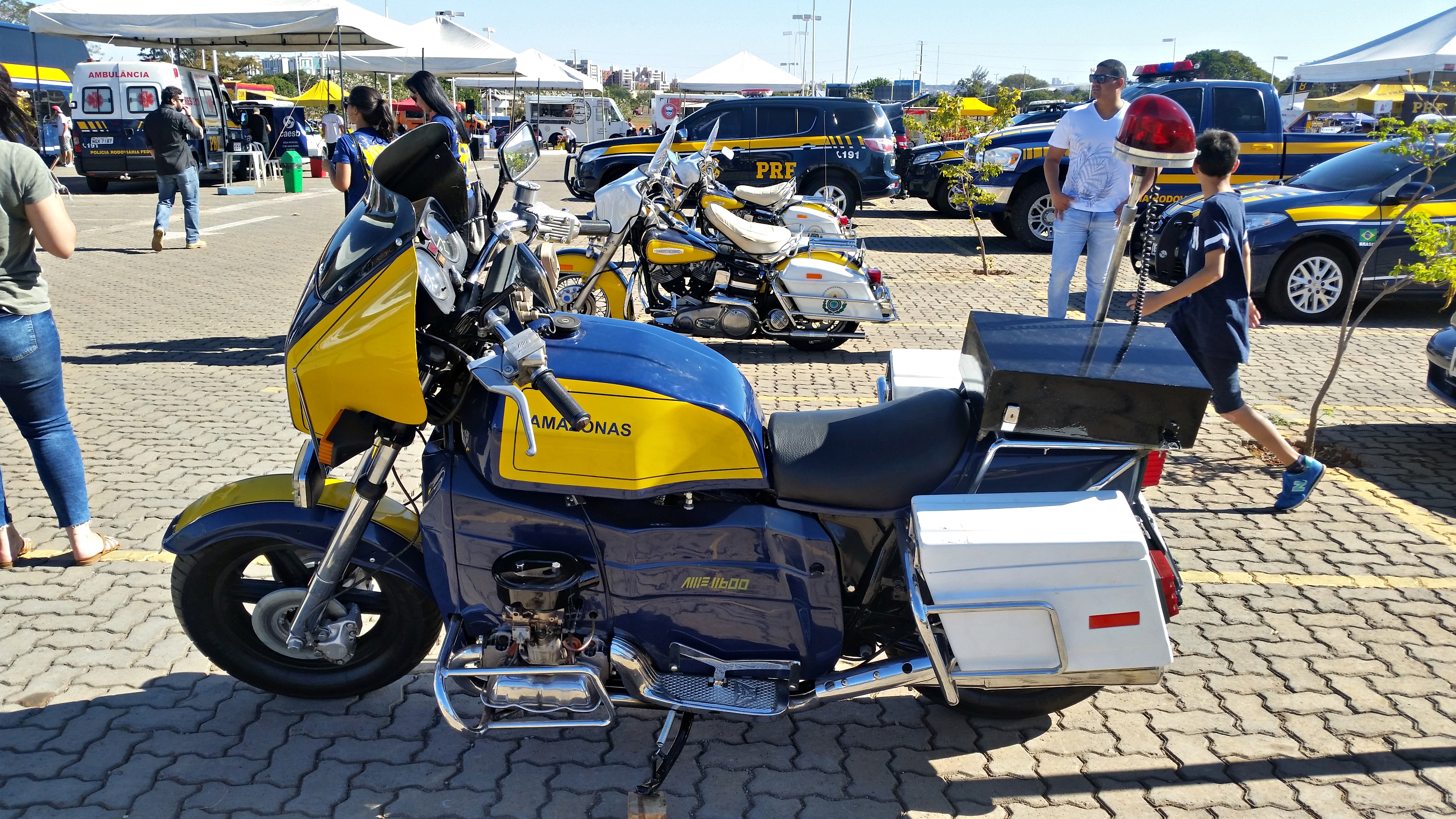
- Manufacturer: Amazonas Motos Especiais
- Also called: Motovolks
- Production: 1978–1988
- Successor: Kahena ST 1600
- Class: Cruiser
- Engine: 1,584 cc (96.7 cu in) air-cooled OHV 4-valve 180° Boxer engine
- Top speed: 140 km/h (87 mph)
- Power: 53 hp (40 kW) civilian version @ 4200 RPM; 68 hp (51 kW) police version @ 4600 RPM
- Torque: 108 N⋅m (80 lb⋅ft) @ 2200 RPM
- Transmission: 4-speed, belt drive
- Wheelbase: 1,690 mm (67 in)
- Dimensions: L: 2,240 mm (88 in); W: 1,050 mm (41 in)
- Seat height: 724 mm (28.5 in)
- Weight: 384 kg (847 lb) (dry); 555 kg (1,224 lb) (wet)
- Fuel capacity: 32 L (8.5 US gal)
- Oil capacity: 2.5 L (2.6 US qt)
- Fuel consumption: 15.2 km/L (36 mpg_{‑US})
- Related: Amazonas 250

The Amazonas 1600 was a motorcycle made by the Brazilian manufacturer Amazonas, manufactured in Manaus from 1978 to 1988.

== Model-specific features ==
When the importation of foreign motor vehicles into Brazil ceased in 1976, there was a need for nationally produced motorcycles. Since only much smaller motorcycles had been manufactured in Brazil until then, the Amazon was received with enthusiasm. In 1978, the company started producing the Amazonas 1600 in three versions: A civilian, military, and police version.

The massive motorcycle was powered by the Volkswagen Beetle engine, and the disc brake system was also from Volkswagen do Brasil.

The air-cooled four-cylinder boxer engine was supplied with fuel by two 32 mm Solex carburetor. The displacement was 1584 cc the power output of the civilian version was stated to be up to 54 hp, the police version was said to have reached 68 hp at 4600 min-1.

The Amazon had the elegance and power of a truck.

— Hugo Wilson
