= 1900 in Brazil =

Events in the year 1900 in Brazil.

== Incumbents ==
=== Federal government ===
- President: Campos Sales
- Vice President: Rosa e Silva

=== Governors ===
- Alagoas: Francisco Manuel dos Santos Pacheco (till 12 June); Euclides Vieira Malta (from 12 June)
- Amazonas: José Cardoso Ramalho Júnior (till 23 July); Silvério José Néri (from 23 July)
- Bahia: Luís Viana; Rodrigues Lima
- Ceará: Antônio Nogueira Accioli (till 12 July); Pedro Augusto Borges (from 12 July)
- Goiás: Urbano Coelho de Gouveia
- Maranhão: João Gualberto Torreão da Costa
- Mato Grosso: Antônio Pedro Alves de Barros
- Minas Gerais: Silviano Brandão
- Pará: Pais de Carvalho
- Paraíba: Antônio Alfredo Mello (till 22 October); José Peregrino de Araújo (from 22 October)
- Paraná: Santos Andrade; Francisco Xavier da Silva
- Pernambuco: Sigismundo Antônio Gonçalves (till 7 April); Antônio Gonçalves Ferreira (from 7 April)
- Piauí: Raimundo Artur de Vasconcelos (till 1 July); Arlindo Francisco Nogueira (from 1 July)
- Rio Grande do Norte: Joaquim Ferreira Chaves (till 25 March); Alberto Maranhão (from 25 March)
- Rio Grande do Sul: Borges de Medeiros
- Santa Catarina:
- São Paulo: Fernando Prestes de Albuquerque (till 1 May); Rodrigues Alves (from 1 May)
- Sergipe:

=== Vice governors ===
- Rio Grande do Norte:
- São Paulo:

== Events ==
- 30 January - Luis Gálvez Rodríguez de Arias is restored to the governorship of Acre.
- 15 March - The Brazilian government sends troops to arrest rebel leader Luis Gálvez Rodríguez de Arias and restore the Republic of Acre to Bolivia.
- 7 May - The first line of electric trams in São Paulo starts operating.
- 3 June - Priest and inventor Landell de Moura publicly demonstrates a radio broadcast of the human voice.
- 11 August - The football club Associação Atlética Ponte Preta is founded.
- November - An attempt is made to create a Second Acre Republic with Rodrigo de Carvalho as president; it fails.
- 1 September - Number of deaths from "Plague" in Rio decreases and the outbreak is limited to the city.
- 24 December - The Brazilians are defeated by the Bolivian military, who dissolve the Republic of Acre.

== Literature ==
- Joaquim Nabuco – Minha formação (autobiography)

== Music ==
- Heitor Villa-Lobos – Panqueca

== Births ==
- 25 February – Madame Satã, drag performer and capoeirista (died 1976)
- 15 March – Gilberto Freyre, sociologist, anthropologist, historian, writer, painter, journalist and congressman (died 1987)
- 11 April – Teóphilo Bettencourt Pereira, footballer (died 1988)
- 19 April – Iracema de Alencar, actress (died 1978)
- 4 June – Alfredo Le Pera, journalist, dramatist and lyricist (died 1935)
- 11 July – Filinto Müller, military-associated politician (died 1973)
- 9 October – Ismael Nery, artist (died 1934)

== Deaths ==
- 18 May - Karl von Kraatz-Koschlau, German geologist (born 1867; yellow fever)
- date unknown - Soto Grimshaw, Argentine explorer of the Amazon region of Brazil (born 1833)
