= 1972 in Brazil =

Events in the year 1972 in Brazil.

== Incumbents ==
=== Federal government ===
- President: General Emílio Médici
- Vice President: General Augusto Rademaker

=== Governors ===
- Acre: Vacant
- Alagoas: Afrânio Lages
- Amazonas: João Walter de Andrade
- Bahia: Antônio Carlos Magalhães
- Ceará: César Cals
- Espírito Santo: Artur Carlos Gerhardt Santos
- Goiás: Leonino Caiado
- Guanabara: Antonio de Pádua Chagas Freitas
- Maranhão: Pedro Neiva de Santana
- Mato Grosso: José Fragelli
- Minas Gerais: Rondon Pacheco
- Pará: Fernando Guilhon
- Paraíba: Ernâni Sátiro
- Paraná: Pedro Viriato Parigot de Sousa
- Pernambuco: Eraldo Gueiros
- Piauí: Alberto Silva
- Rio de Janeiro: Raimundo Padhila
- Rio Grande do Norte: Jose Pereira de Araújo Cortez
- Rio Grande do Sul: Euclides Triches
- Santa Catarina: Colombo Salles
- São Paulo: Laudo Natel
- Sergipe: Paulo Barreto de Menezes

=== Vice governors ===
- Acre: Alberto Barbosa da Costa
- Alagoas: José de Medeiros Tavares
- Amazonas: Deoclides de Carvalho Leal
- Bahia: Menandro Minahim
- Ceará: Francisco Humberto Bezerra
- Espírito Santo: Henrique Pretti
- Goiás: Ursulino Tavares Leão
- Maranhão: Alexandre Sá Colares Moreira
- Mato Grosso: José Monteiro de Figueiredo
- Minas Gerais: Celso Porfírio de Araújo Machado
- Pará: Newton Burlamaqui Barreira
- Paraíba: Clóvis Bezerra Cavalcanti
- Paraná: Vacant
- Pernambuco: José Antônio Barreto Guimarães
- Piauí: Sebastião Rocha Leal
- Rio de Janeiro: Teotônio Araújo
- Rio Grande do Norte: Tertius Rebelo
- Rio Grande do Sul: Edmar Fetter
- Santa Catarina: Atílio Francisco Xavier Fontana
- São Paulo: Antonio José Rodrigues Filho
- Sergipe: Adalberto Moura

== Events ==
=== February ===
- 19 February: The inauguration of the Festa da Uva by President Emílio Garrastazu Médici, in Caxias do Sul, Rio Grande do Sul; is nationally broadcast on color television for the first time.
- 24 February: A fire at the Pirani Building (now the Andraus Building), leaves 16 dead and 330 injured in São Paulo, making it one of the biggest tragedies in the city's history.

=== June ===
- June 29: The National Congress of Brazil approves the project to create Telecomunicações Brasileiras S/A (Telebras).

=== July ===
- July 24: A team from the Polytechnic School of the University of São Paulo builds the first Brazilian (and South American) computer. It is introduced by Governor of São Paulo and rector Miguel Reale.

=== September ===
- 18 September: São Paulo Metro is inaugurated in Brazil.
- 27 September: Emerson Fittipaldi wins his first Formula One world championship after winning the Italian Grand Prix.
- 27 September: President Emílio Garrastazu Médici introduces the first stretch of the Trans-Amazonian Highway.

== Births ==
=== January ===
- January 1: Gabriela Alves, actress
- January 2:
  - Rita Guedes, actress
  - Sérgio Baresi, coach and former footballer
- January 19: Cynthia Falabella, actress

=== February ===
- 4 February: Giovanni Silva de Oliveira, footballer
- 7 February: Amon Tobin, musician
- 13 February – Ana Paula Connelly, volleyball player

=== April ===
- 19 April: Rivaldo, footballer

=== May ===
- 23 May: Rubens Barrichello, racing driver
- 27 May: Ivete Sangalo, singer-songwriter, actress and television show host

=== June ===
- 16 June: Kiko Loureiro, guitarist
- 30 June: Fabiano Scherner, mixed martial artist and jiu-jitsu black belt

=== July ===
- 23 July: Giovane Élber, footballer

=== August ===
- 1 August: Sergio Moro, politician and federal judge
- 28 August: Ivan Almeida Dias, futsal player

=== September ===
- 28 September: Guta Stresser, actress

=== October ===
- 30 October: Paola Carosella, Cook and MasterChef judge

=== November ===
- November 12: Reynaldo Gianecchini, actor and model
- November 22: Eliana, television host and businesswoman
- November 29: Rodrigo Pessoa, equestrian

=== December ===
- December 2: Gustavo Borges, swimmer
- December 30: Selton Mello, actor and film director

== Deaths ==
- Lia Torá, dancer and actress (b. 1907)

=== June ===
- 14 June: Leila Diniz, actress (b. 1945)

=== August ===
- 31 August: Dalva de Oliveira, singer (b.1917)

=== October ===
- 6 October: Cléo de Verberena, actress and film director (b. 1904)

=== November ===
- November 10: Torquato Neto, poet, journalist and songwriter (b. 1944)

== See also ==
- 1972 in Brazilian football
- 1973 in Brazilian television
