= 1944 in Brazil =

Events in the year 1944 in Brazil.

== Incumbents ==
=== Federal government ===
- President: Getúlio Vargas

=== Governors ===
- Alagoas: Ismar de Góis Monteiro
- Amazonas: Álvaro Botelho Maia
- Bahia: Renato Onofre Pinto Aleixo
- Ceará: Francisco de Meneses Pimentel
- Espírito Santo: João Punaro Bley
- Goiás: Pedro Ludovico Teixeira
- Maranhão:
- Mato Grosso: Júlio Strübing Müller
- Minas Gerais: Benedito Valadares Ribeiro
- Pará: Magalhães Barata
- Paraíba: Rui Carneiro
- Paraná: Manuel Ribas
- Pernambuco: Agamenon Magalhães
- Piauí: Leônidas Melo
- Rio Grande do Norte: Rafael Fernandes Gurjão/Antonio Fernandes Dantas
- Rio Grande do Sul: Ernesto Dornelles
- Santa Catarina: Nereu Ramos
- São Paulo: Fernando de Sousa Costa
- Sergipe: Augusto Maynard Gomes

=== Vice governors ===
- Rio Grande do Norte: no vice governor
- São Paulo: no vice governor

== Events ==
- 1 January - The former Royal Military Academy expends into the city of Resende.
- 2 July - Second World War: The first five thousand Brazilian Expeditionary Force soldiers, the 6th RCT, leave Brazil for Europe aboard the USNS General Mann.
- September - Brazilian air-land forces go into action in Italy.
- 31 October - Brazilian pilots begin operations, as individual elements of flights attached to 350th FG squadrons.
- date unknown
  - The Banco Nacional is founded in São Paulo.
  - Getúlio Vargas allocated an area of 4 million square meters near Santa Maria for the purpose of building an aerodrome. Santa Maria Airport opens the following year.

== Arts and culture ==
=== Books ===
- Jorge Amado - São Jorge dos Ilhéus
- Oswald de Andrade - Meu Testamento

=== Films ===
- Corações Sem Piloto
- Berlim na Batucada
- É Proibido Sonhar
- O Brasileiro João de Souza

=== Music ===
- Camargo Guarnieri - Symphony no 1

== Births ==
- 8 February - Sebastião Salgado, photojournalist (died 2025)
- 19 June - Chico Buarque, singer, dramatist, writer and poet
- 27 June - Zezé Motta, actress and singer
- 11 July - Valdeir Vieira, football manager
- 2 August - Naná Vasconcelos, jazz musician (died 2016)
- 6 October - Amelinha Teles, journalist and human rights activist (died 2026)
- 18 October - Nelson Freire, pianist (died 2021)
- 9 November - Torquato Neto, journalist, poet and songwriter (died 1972)
- 13 December - Luiz Eduardo de Oliveira ("Léo"), comics creator
- 15 December - Chico Mendes, rubber tapper and activist (died 1988)

== Deaths ==
- 29 April - Bernardino Machado, President of Portugal 1915–17 and 1925–26 (born 1851)

== See also ==
- 1944 in Brazilian football
- List of Brazilian films of 1944
