= 1988 in Brazil =

Events in the year 1988 in Brazil.

== Incumbents ==
=== Federal government ===
- President: José Sarney
- Vice President: Vacant

=== Governors ===
- Acre: Flaviano Melo
- Alagoas: Fernando Collor de Mello
- Amazonas: Amazonino Mendes
- Bahia: Waldir Pires
- Ceará: Tasso Jereissati
- Espírito Santo: Max Freitas Mauro
- Goiás: Henrique Santillo
- Maranhão: Epitácio Cafeteira
- Mato Grosso: Carlos Bezerra
- Mato Grosso do Sul: Marcelo Miranda Soares
- Minas Gerais: Newton Cardoso
- Pará: Hélio Gueiros
- Paraíba: Tarcísio Burity
- Paraná: Alvaro Dias
- Pernambuco: Miguel Arraes
- Piauí: Alberto Silva
- Rio de Janeiro: Moreira Franco
- Rio Grande do Norte: Geraldo José Ferreira de Melo
- Rio Grande do Sul: Pedro Simon
- Rondônia: Jerônimo Garcia de Santana
- Roraima: Romero Jucá
- Santa Catarina: Pedro Ivo Campos
- São Paulo: Orestes Quércia
- Sergipe: Antônio Carlos Valadares

=== Vice governors ===
- Acre: Edison Simão Cadaxo
- Alagoas: Moacir Andrade
- Amazonas: Vivaldo Barros Frota
- Bahia: Nilo Moraes Coelho
- Ceará: Francisco Castelo de Castro
- Espírito Santo: Carlos Alberto Batista da Cunha
- Goiás: Joaquim Domingos Roriz
- Maranhão: João Alberto Souza
- Mato Grosso: Edison de Oliveira
- Mato Grosso do Sul: George Takimoto
- Minas Gerais: Júnia Marise de Azeredo Coutinho
- Pará: Hermínio Calvinho Filho
- Paraíba: Vacant
- Paraná: Ary Veloso Queiroz
- Pernambuco: Carlos Wilson Rocha de Queirós Campos
- Piauí: Lucídio Portela Nunes
- Rio de Janeiro: Francisco Amaral
- Rio Grande do Norte: Garibaldi Alves
- Rio Grande do Sul: Sinval Sebastião Duarte Guazzelli
- Rondônia: Orestes Muniz Filho
- Santa Catarina: Casildo João Maldaner
- São Paulo: Almino Afonso
- Sergipe: Benedito de Figueiredo

== Events ==
=== January ===
- January 6-16: The first official edition of Hollywood Rock takes place at Praça da Apoteose in Rio de Janeiro from January 6 to 9 and at Estádio do Morumbi in São Paulo from January 13 to 16.

=== June ===
- June 25: PSDB is founded by members of the Brazilian Democratic Movement Party linked to the European social democratic movement as an attempt to clarify their ideals.

=== August ===
- August 3: The end of censorship and torture, as well as freedom of intellectual expression and the press in the country, is approved, by a vote of 313 to 5, by the National Constituent Assembly.

=== September ===
- September 29: VASP Flight 375, made by a Boeing 737-300, is hijacked by an unemployed person, with the intention of crashing the plane into the Planalto Palace and killing President José Sarney. The kidnapping ends unsuccessfully.

=== October ===
- October 5: The country's current constitution is created. According to the new constitution, Roraima becomes Brazil's 24th state.

=== November ===
- November 29: Presidents José Sarney of Brazil and Raúl Alfonsin of Argentina, sign the Treaty of Integration, Cooperation and Development in Buenos Aires, which stipulates a deadline for the creation of a free trade area between the two countries.

=== December ===
- December 22: Brazilian union and environmental activist Chico Mendes is assassinated.
- December 31: The Bateau Mouche cruise ship capsized and sank in the South Atlantic off Rio de Janeiro with the loss of at least 51 of the 149 people on board.

== Births ==
=== January ===
- January 16: Mel Fronckowiak, actress and television host
- January 17: Taison, professional footballer
- January 21: Felipe Neto, YouTuber

=== February ===
- February 8: Renato Augusto, professional footballer

=== March ===
- March 28: Arthur Sanches, football player

=== May ===
- May 1: Mayky Vilaça, politician
- May 12: Marcelo, professional footballer
- May 30: Amanda Nunes, mixed martial artist

=== June ===
- June 7: Marlos, professional footballer

=== July ===
- July 5: Adriano Buzaid, racing driver
- July 25: Paulinho, professional footballer

=== August ===
- August 9: Willian, professional footballer

=== September ===
- September 19: Thiago Martins, actor
- September 28: Caio César, actor, voice actor and police officer (d. 2015)

== Deaths ==
=== January ===
- January 4: Henfil, cartoonist and writer (b. 1944)
- January 11: Janires, singer-songwriter (b. 1953)
- January 15: Viana Moog, writer and journalist (b. 1906)

=== April ===
- April 25: Lygia Clark, artist (b. 1920)

=== May ===
- May 28: Alfredo Volpi, painter (b. 1896)

=== June ===
- June 30: Chacrinha, television personality (b. 1917)

=== August ===
- August 23: Menotti Del Picchia, poet and painter (b. 1892)

=== December ===
- December 22: Francisco Alves Mendes Filho, environmental activist (b. 1944)
- December 31: Yara Amaral, actress (b. 1936)

== See also ==
- 1988 in Brazilian football
- 1988 in Brazilian television
