= Kahena (motorcycle) =

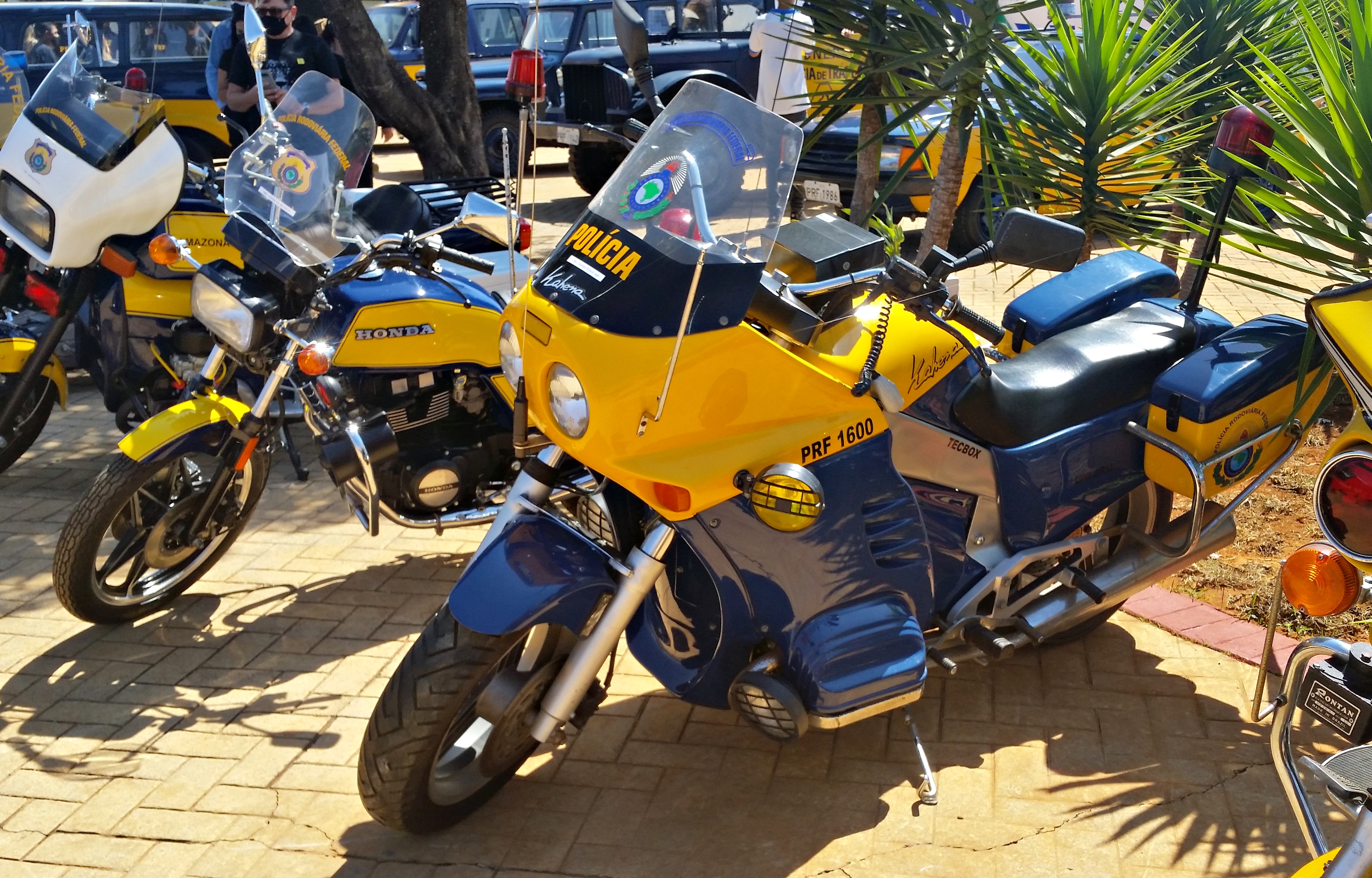
- Manufacturer: Técnica Paulista de Máquinas
- Also called: LJ1600RT, SS1600, ST1600
- Production: 1992–1999
- Predecessor: Amazonas 1600
- Class: Sport touring
- Engine: 1,584 cubic centimetres (96.7 cu in) air-cooled SOHC 4-valve Boxer engine Cylinder bore/stroke 85.5/69mm
- Top speed: 212 kilometres per hour (132 mph)
- Power: 90 horsepower (67 kW) @5800 RPM
- Torque: 115 newton-metres (85 lbf⋅ft) @3500 RPM
- Transmission: 4-speed, belt drive
- Suspension: Front: 155mm telescopic fork stroke Rear: dual shocks, 100mm Cantilever-type single shock
- Tires: Front: Pirelli 120/70-ZR 18 59W Pirelli Rear: Pirelli 170/60-ZR 17 73W
- Wheelbase: 1,570 millimetres (62 in)
- Dimensions: L: 2,267 millimetres (89.3 in); W: 790 millimetres (31 in); H: 1,280 millimetres (50 in)
- Seat height: 740 millimetres (29 in)
- Weight: 317 kilograms (699 lb) (dry)
- Fuel capacity: 26 litres (5.7 imp gal; 6.9 US gal)
- Oil capacity: 2.5 litres (0.55 imp gal; 0.66 US gal)
- Fuel consumption: 14.1 kilometres per litre (40 mpg_{‑imp}; 33 mpg_{‑US})

The Kahena was a motorcycle made by the Brazilian manufacturer Paulista Machine Technique S.A., manufactured in São Paulo from 1991 to 1999.

== Model-specific features ==
After the sale of the old Amazonas brand, former owners Luiz Gomi and José Biston together developed a new motorcycle called Kahena in 1988. In 1990 they sold the production rights to an industry in São Paulo, which manufactured the first six prototypes and presented them in 1991 at the São Paulo International Motor Show. The first models were delivered to the buyers only in 1992. From 1993 on, the Kahena was available in sport bike and sport touring configuration.

Similar to its predecessor, it also had a 1600cc engine VW do Brasil, the same used in the VW Beetle. Available in two engine configurations 65 hp at 4,600 rpm and 90 hp at 5,800 rpm. In both versions the carburetion was double Brasol 32mm, four-speed gearbox, plus the reverse gear, using Volkswagen gears.

The secondary transmission was a cardan shaft on mono cantilever scales, the brakes were double disc in the front and single disc in the rear. The front suspension had common telescopic forks, but the rear was carried by a single spring and shock absorber assembly, a large monocoque was installed in a diagonal position, attached to the inner part of the frame at the front and to the rear scale.
