= 1886 in Brazil =

Events in the year 1886 in Brazil.

== Incumbents ==
- Monarch: Pedro II
- Prime Minister: Baron of Cotegipe

== Events ==
- July 23: The Republic of Cunani, located in present-day Amapá, is proclaimed.
- unknown date: The Brazilian arboreal mouse (Rhagomys rufescens) is described for the first time by zoologists.

== Births ==
- April 19: Manuel Bandeira, poet (died 1968)
- September 1: Tarsila do Amaral, artist (died 1973)
