= Heverton Perereca =

Brazilian footballer

Personal information
- Full name: Heverton Santos de Oliveira
- Date of birth: 15 April 1978 (age 48)
- Place of birth: Cuiabá, Brazil
- Height: 1.81 m (5 ft 11 in)
- Position: Goalkeeper

Youth career
- 1996–1997: Mixto

Senior career*
Years	Team	Apps	(Gls)
1996–1998	Mixto		
1999–2000	Berga		
2001	Ceilândia		
2003	Cuiabá		
2004	Luverdense		
2005	Mixto		
2005	Luverdense		
2007	Cacerense		
2008	União Rondonópolis		
2009	Genus		
2009	CSA		
2009	União Barbarense		
2009	Operário-MT		
2010	Campinense		
2010	Cuiabá		
2010	CRB		
2011	Vila Aurora		
2011	Coruripe		
2011–2012	Mixto		
2013	Mato Grosso EC		
2013	Operário-MT		
2014	Dom Bosco		
2015–2017	Operário-MT		
2018	Ação		
2018	Juara		
- * Club domestic league appearances and goals as of 20 May 2025

Heverton Santos de Oliveira (born 15 April 1978), better known by the nickname Heverton Perereca, is a Brazilian former professional footballer who played as a goalkeeper.

== Career ==
Heverton Perereca debuted his professional career in 1996 playing for Mixto with only 17 years old, when due to an injury to the main goalkeepers he received an opportunity against Sinop. Throughout his career he accumulated the mark of more than 350 appearances in the Matogrossense Championship, playing for several clubs in the state.

On 14 August 2011, playing for Vila Aurora against Cuiabá, in a match valid for the 2011 Campeonato Brasileiro Série D, Perereca scored a goal from a free kick.

On 18 January 2018, while playing for Operário-MT, Perereca was arrested during half-time of the match against Luverdense, for late payment of child support, being released only on the 27th of same month.

Perereca won a total of three state titles and three more in the FMF Cup. His last professional club was Juara in 2018.

== Personal life ==
In 2023, he announced on his social media that he was graduating in physical education. Perereca is cousin of the also footballer Hugo Alcântara, who was his coach at Ação in 2018.

== Honours ==
Mixto

- Campeonato Matogrossense: 1996
- Copa FMF: 2012

Cuiabá

- Campeonato Matogrossense: 2003
- Copa FMF: 2010

Cacerense

- Campeonato Matogrossense: 2007

Luverdense

- Copa FMF: 2004

== See also ==
- List of goalscoring goalkeepers
