= 1968 in Brazilian television =

This is a list of Brazilian television related events from 1968.

== Events ==
- 2 February – TV Globo in Belo Horizonte was inaugurated.

== Networks and services ==
=== Launches ===
Network	Type	Launch date	Notes	Source
TV Globo Minas	Terrestrial	5 February		
TV Universitária	Terrestrial	22 November		

== Births ==
- 1 March - Christine Fernandes, American-born actress
- 17 May - Mônica Martelli, actress & TV host

== See also ==
- 1968 in Brazil
