= Wormwood Star =

Wormwood Star may refer to:

- Wormwood (Bible), a star or angel that appears in the Book of Revelation
- A Estrela de Absinto, a 1927 novel by Oswald de Andrade
- A miscarried child of Marjorie Cameron
  - The Wormwood Star, a 1956 film about Marjorie Cameron by Curtis Harrington
  - Wormwood Star, a 2011 book about Marjorie Cameron by Spencer Kansa
- "The Wormwood Star", a 1984 poem by Czesław Miłosz
- Wormwood Star, a 1996 album by Duo Zikr
