= 1978 in Brazilian television =

This is a list of Brazilian television related events from 1978.

== Debuts ==
- July 10: Dancin' Days

== Networks and services ==
=== Launches ===
Network	Type	Launch date	Notes	Source
TV Paranaíba	Terrestrial	28 June	Band affiliate until 2003, when it switched to Record	

== Television shows ==
- Turma da Mônica (1976–present)
- Sítio do Picapau Amarelo (1977–1986)

== Births ==
- 13 January - Victor Pecoraro, actor & model
- 3 August - Anderson Di Rizzi, actor
- 6 October - Samara Felippo, actress
- 4 December - Katiuscia Canoro, actress

== See also ==
- 1978 in Brazil
