= 1973 in Brazil =

Events in the year 1973 in Brazil.

== Incumbents ==
=== Federal government ===
- President: General Emílio Médici
- Vice President: General Augusto Rademaker

=== Governors ===
- Acre: Vacant
- Alagoas: Afrânio Lages
- Amazonas: João Walter de Andrade
- Bahia: Antônio Carlos Magalhães
- Ceará: César Cals
- Espírito Santo: Artur Carlos Gerhardt Santos
- Goiás: Leonino Caiado
- Guanabara: Antonio de Pádua Chagas Freitas
- Maranhão: Pedro Neiva de Santana
- Mato Grosso: José Fragelli
- Minas Gerais: Rondon Pacheco
- Pará: Fernando Guilhon
- Paraíba: Ernâni Sátiro
- Paraná: Emílio Hoffmann Gomes
- Pernambuco: Eraldo Gueiros
- Piauí: Alberto Silva
- Rio de Janeiro: Raimundo Padhila
- Rio Grande do Norte: Jose Pereira de Araújo Cortez
- Rio Grande do Sul: Euclides Triches
- Santa Catarina: Colombo Salles
- São Paulo: Laudo Natel
- Sergipe: Paulo Barreto de Menezes

=== Vice governors ===
- Acre: Alberto Barbosa da Costa
- Alagoas: José de Medeiros Tavares
- Amazonas: Deoclides de Carvalho Leal
- Bahia: Menandro Minahim
- Ceará: Francisco Humberto Bezerra
- Espírito Santo: Henrique Pretti
- Goiás: Ursulino Tavares Leão
- Maranhão: Alexandre Sá Colares Moreira
- Mato Grosso: José Monteiro de Figueiredo
- Minas Gerais: Celso Porfírio de Araújo Machado
- Pará: Newton Burlamaqui Barreira
- Paraíba: Clóvis Bezerra Cavalcanti
- Paraná: Jaime Canet Júnior (from 11 August)
- Pernambuco: José Antônio Barreto Guimarães
- Piauí: Sebastião Rocha Leal
- Rio de Janeiro: Teotônio Araújo
- Rio Grande do Norte: Tertius Rebelo
- Rio Grande do Sul: Edmar Fetter
- Santa Catarina: Atílio Francisco Xavier Fontana
- São Paulo: Antonio José Rodrigues Filho
- Sergipe: Adalberto Moura

== Events ==
=== January ===
- 11 January: President Emílio Garrastazu Médici signs a law that establishes the Brazilian Civil Procedure Code.

=== February ===
- 11 February: Emerson Fittipaldi wins the 1973 Brazilian Grand Prix at Interlagos.

=== April ===
- 26 April: Presidents Emílio Garrastazu Médici of Brazil and Alfredo Stroessner of Paraguay sign the Treaty of Itaipu in Brasília, for a joint use of hydroelectric power in the Paraná River.

=== June ===
- 18 June: The president of Petrobras, General Ernesto Geisel, is selected as a candidate for President of Brazil.

=== July ===
- 11 July: Varig Flight 820 makes a forced landing due to a fire breaking out and then crashing in Paris, France. 123 out of the 134 people are dead from the crash, fire, and smoke inhalation.

== Births ==
=== January ===
- 1 January: Shelda Bede, volleyball player
- 22 January: Rogério Ceni, retired footballer and coach

=== February ===
- 2 February: Latino, singer-songwriter
- 22 February: Gustavo Assis-Brasil, guitarist
- 22 February: Juninho Paulista, footballer

=== April ===
- 10 April: Roberto Carlos, footballer
- 18 April: Adriane Galisteu, Brazilian actress and model
- 15 April: Emanuel Rego, beach volleyball player

=== May ===
- 8 May: Jorge Patino, mixed martial arts fighter

=== June ===
- 16 June: Veronica Rossi, novelist

=== July ===
- 19 July: Aílton, footballer

=== August ===
- 4 August: Marcos, footballer
- 6 August: Vanessa Gerbelli, actress
- 10 August: Zé Roberto, footballer

=== September ===
- 24 September: Scheila Carvalho, model and dancer
- 26 September: Leandro Hassum, actor, comedian, writer & producer

=== October ===
- 7 October: Dida, footballer
- 20 October: Rodrigo Faro, TV host, actor & singer

=== November ===
- 22 November: Eliana Michaelichen Bezerra, TV host, actress & singer
- 30 November: Angélica Ksyvickis, TV host, actress, singer & businesswoman

=== December ===
- December 3: Bruno Campos, actor and lawyer

== Deaths ==
=== January ===
- 17 January: Tarsila do Amaral, modernist artist (b. 1886).

=== July ===
- 11 July:
  - Jörg Bruder, sailor and geology professor (b. 1937)
  - Júlio Delamare, sports journalist (b. 1928)
  - Filinto Müller, politician (b. 1900)
  - Agostinho dos Santos, singer and composer of bossa nova (b. 1932)

== See also ==
- 1973 in Brazilian football
- 1973 in Brazilian television
