= 1892 in Brazil =

Events in the year 1892 in Brazil.

== Incumbents ==
=== Federal government ===
- President: Marshal Floriano Peixoto
- Vice-President: vacant

=== Governors ===
- Alagoas: Manuel Gomes Riberio (until 24 March), Gabino Besuoro (starting 24 March)
- Amazonas:
  - until 27 February: Gregório Taumaturgo Azevedo
  - 27 February: José Inácio Borges Machado
  - starting 27 February: Eduardo Gonçalves Ribeiro
- Bahia: Leal Ferreira then Rodrigues Lima
- Ceará: José Clarindo de Queirós, until 16 February
  - João Nepomuceno de Medeiros Mallet, until 18 February
  - Benjamin Liberato Barroso, until 12 July
  - Antônio Nogueira Accioli, until 27 August
  - José Bezerril Fontenelle
- Goiás:
  - until February 19: Constâncio Ribeiro da Maia
  - February 19 - July 17: Brás Abrantes
  - from July 17: Antônio Caiado
- Maranhão:
  - until January 8: Maranhão Governing Board of 1891
  - January 8 - November 30: Manuel Belfort Vieira
  - from November 30: Alfredo Martins
- Mato Grosso:
- Minas Gerais:
  - until February 9: Cesário Alvim
  - February 9 - July 13: Eduardo Ernesto da Gama Cerqueira
  - from July 14: Afonso Pena
- Pará: Lauro Sodré
- Paraíba:
  - until February 18: Paraíba governing board of 1891
  - from February 18: Álvaro Lopes Machado
- Paraná:
  - until April 7: Antônio Epaminondas de Barros Correia
  - April 7 - April 20: Ambrósio Machado da Cunha Cavalcanti
  - From April 20: Alexandre José Barbosa Lima
- Pernambuco:
  - until April 7: Antônio Epaminondas de Barros Correia
  - April 7 - 20: Ambrósio Machado da Cunha Cavalcanti
  - from April 20: Alexandre José Barbosa Lima
- Piauí:
  - until February 11: Álvaro Lopes Machado
  - from February 11: Coriolano de Carvalho e Silva
- Rio Grande do Norte:
  - until February 22: Governing board consisting of: Francisco de Lima e Silva, Joaquim Ferreira Chaves, and Manuel do Nascimento Castro and Silva
  - February 22-28: Jerome Américo Raposo Chamber
  - from February 28: Pedro de Albuquerque Maranhão
- Rio Grande do Sul:
  - until June 8: Military Junta of 1891
  - June 8-16: José Antônio Correia da Câmara
  - June 16-17: Júlio Prates de Castilhos
  - from June 17: Vitoriano Ribeiro Carneiro Monteiro
- Santa Catarina:
- São Paulo:
- Sergipe:

=== Vice governors ===
- Rio de Janeiro: Miguel de Carvalho (9 April-3 May), Manuel Torres (starting 3 May)
- Rio Grande do Norte: no vice-governor (until 28 February), Silvino Bezerra (starting 28 February)
- São Paulo: José Alves de Cerqueira César

== Events ==
- 21 May - The French-built monitor Solimoes is wrecked off Cape Polonio, Uruguay, with the loss of 125 lives.
- date unknown
  - Danish botanist Eugenius Warming gives the first detailed description of the Brazilian cerrado in his book Lagoa Santa.
  - The Afro-Brazilian practice of Capoeira is banned (not to be re-legalised until 1937).

== Births ==
- 20 January - Sud Mennucci, journalist and educator (died 1948)
- 20 March - Menotti Del Picchia, poet, journalist and painter (died 1982)
- 23 April - Francisco Cavalcanti Pontes de Miranda, lawyer and diplomat (died 1979)
- 18 July - Arthur Friedenreich, soccer player, regarded by some as the sport's first outstanding black player (died 1969)
- 23 July - João de Souza Mendes, chess master (died 1969)
- 4 October - Assis Chateaubriand, lawyer, journalist, politician and diplomat (died 1968)
- 27 October - Graciliano Ramos, modernist writer, politician and journalist (died 1953)

== Deaths ==
- 23 August - Deodoro da Fonseca, first president of the Republic of Brazil (born 1827)
