= 1968 in Brazil =

Events of the year 1968 in Brazil

== Incumbents ==
=== Federal government ===
- President: Marshal Artur da Costa e Silva
- Vice-President: Pedro Aleixo

=== Governors ===
- Acre: Vacant
- Alagoas: Antônio Simeão de Lamenha Filho
- Amazonas: Danilo Duarte de Matos Areosa
- Bahia: Luís Viana Filho
- Ceará: Plácido Castelo
- Espírito Santo: Cristiano Dias Lopes Filho
- Goiás: Otávio Lage
- Guanabara: Francisco Negrão de Lima
- Maranhão: José Sarney
- Mato Grosso: Pedro Pedrossian
- Minas Gerais: Israel Pinheiro da Silva
- Pará: Alacid Nunes
- Paraíba: João Agripino Maia
- Paraná: Pablo Cruz Pimentel
- Pernambuco: Nilo Coelho
- Piauí: Helvídio Nunes
- Rio de Janeiro: Geremias de Mattos Fontes
- Rio Grande do Norte: Walfredo Gurgel Dantas
- Rio Grande do Sul: Walter Peracchi Barcelos
- Santa Catarina: Ivo Silveira
- São Paulo: Roberto Costa de Abreu Sodré
- Sergipe: Lourival Baptista

=== Vice governors ===
- Alagoas: Manoel Sampaio Luz
- Amazonas: Rui Arajuo
- Bahia: Jutahy Magalhães
- Ceará: Humberto Ellery
- Espírito Santo: Isaac Lopes Rubim
- Goiás: Osires Teixeira
- Maranhão: Antonio Jorge Dino
- Mato Grosso: Lenine de Campos Póvoas
- Minas Gerais: Pio Soares Canedo
- Pará: João Renato Franco
- Paraíba: Antônio Juarez Farias
- Paraná: Plínio Franco Ferreira da Costa
- Pernambuco: Salviano Machado Filho
- Piauí: João Clímaco d'Almeida
- Rio de Janeiro: Heli Ribeiro Gomes
- Rio Grande do Norte: Clóvis Motta
- Santa Catarina: Jorge Bornhausen
- São Paulo: Hilário Torloni
- Sergipe: Vacant

== Events ==
=== March ===
- 28 March: A 16 year-old student named Edson Luís de Lima Souto, is killed after being shot in the chest by a police officer. This was during a protest between students and the Military Police at the Calabouço restaurant, in the UNE building, in Rio de Janeiro.

=== April ===
- 5 April: The Minister of Justice, Luís Antônio da Gama e Silva, signs an act, prohibiting the functioning of the leftist political movement, known as Frente Ampla.
- 20 April: A bomb attack destroys the headquarters entrance of the newspaper O Estado de S. Paulo, in São Paulo.

=== May ===
- 15 May: A bomb explodes at the door of the São Paulo Stock Exchange.
- 26 May: Dr. Euryclides de Jesus Zerbini and his team perform the first heart transplant in Latin America.
- 30 May: A 23rd star representing the state of Acre, established six years before, is added to the flag of Brazil.

=== June ===
- 26 June: The Passeata dos Cem Mil (March of the One Hundred Thousand), a demonstration organized by the student movement against the military regime, takes place in the center of Rio de Janeiro.

=== July ===
- 5 July: The Minister of Justice, Luís Antônio da Gama e Silva bans street demonstrations across the country.
- 13 July: Martha Vasconcellos becomes the second Brazilian to win the Miss Universe title, in the pageant held in Miami Beach, Florida, United States.

=== November ===
- 1-11 November: Queen Elizabeth II of the United Kingdom arrives in Brazil for an eleven-day visit.
- 7 November: The new headquarters of the São Paulo Museum of Art on Avenida Paulista is inaugurated with the presence of Queen Elizabeth II of the United Kingdom.

=== December ===
- 13 December: President Costa e Silva issues Institucional Act Number 5, giving the President powers to intervene on local governments, suspend Congress, ban political meetings, as well as censor the press, music and film.
- 16 December: Mobster Castor de Andrade is arrested, after Secretary of Public Security of Guanabara, General Luís de França Oliveira, starts one of the biggest attacks against crime.
- 30 December: The Secretariat of the National Defense Council publishes a list of impeached federal deputies.

== Births ==
=== January ===
- 3 January: Matheus Nachtergaele, actor and director
- 7 January: Cazé Peçanha, television host
- 12 January: Mauro Silva, former footballer

=== July ===
- 20 July: Carlos Saldanha, director

=== November ===
- 18 November: Luizianne Lins, politician

=== December ===
- 31 December: Luciano Szafir, actor

== Deaths ==
=== April ===
- 4 April: Assis Chateaubriand, entrepreneur (b. 1892)

=== October ===
- 13 October: Manuel Bandeira, poet (b. 1886)

== See also ==
- 1968 in Brazilian football
- 1968 in Brazilian television
