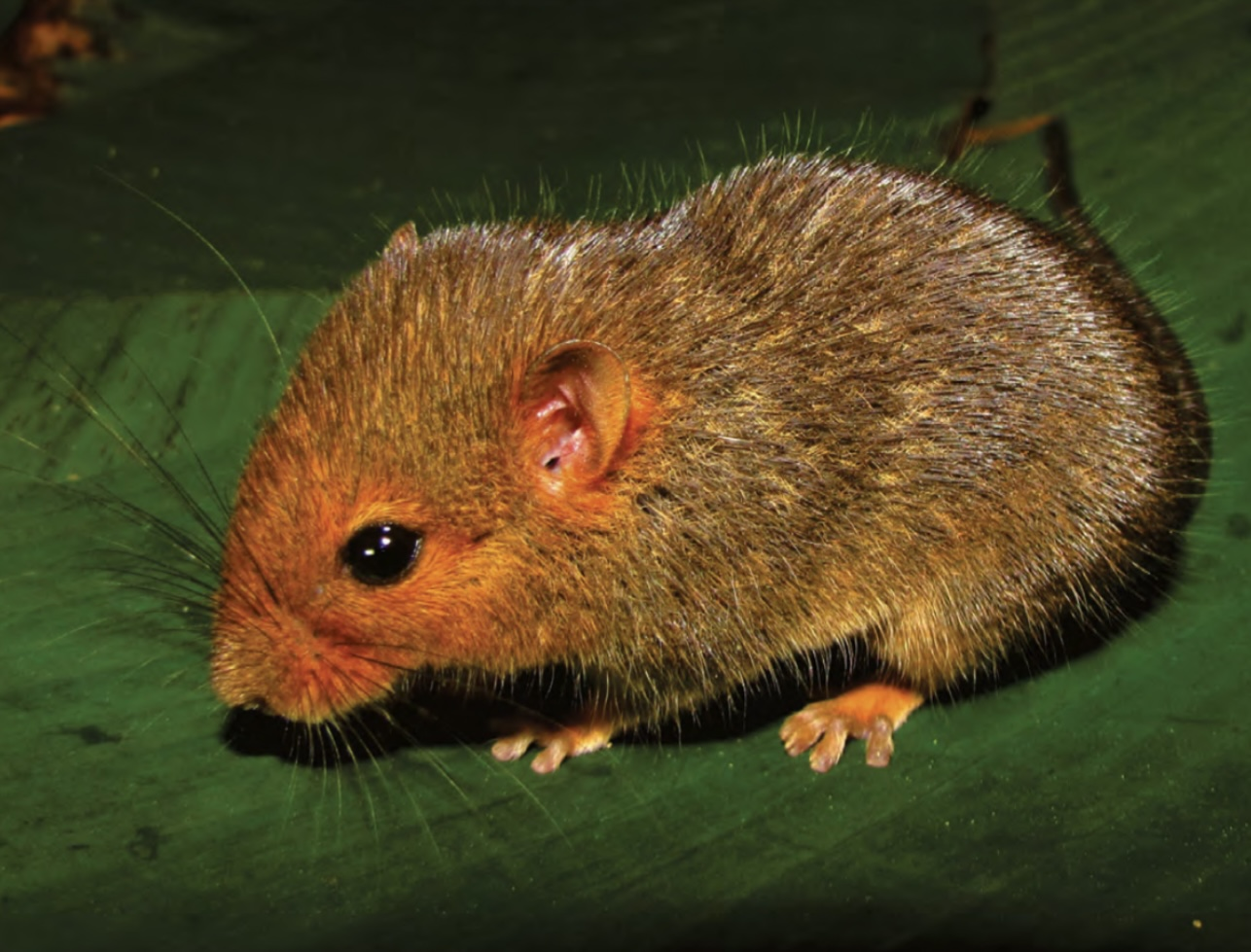

Conservation status
- Least Concern (IUCN 3.1)

Scientific classification
- Kingdom: Animalia
- Phylum: Chordata
- Class: Mammalia
- Order: Rodentia
- Family: Cricetidae
- Subfamily: Sigmodontinae
- Genus: Rhagomys
- Species: R. longilingua

Binomial name
- Rhagomys longilingua Luna & Patterson, 2003

= Long-tongued arboreal mouse =

Species of rodent

The long-tongued arboreal mouse (Rhagomys longilingua) is a South American rodent species of the family Cricetidae. It is found in a variety of habitats, including dense forest, in Bolivia and Peru at elevations from 450 to 2,100 metres (1,480 to 6,890 ft) on the eastern side of the Andes. The species is at least partly arboreal. It is distinguished from the Brazilian arboreal mouse (R. rufescens), the only other known member of Rhagomys, by spiny fur and certain skull features such as the presence of beading in the interorbital region.

== Description ==
The adult long-tongued arboreal mouse weighs in the range 25 to 35 g (0.88 to 1.23 oz) and has a tail that is nearly as long as the head-and-body length. The fur is short and dense, and consists of a mixture of long slender hairs and spines, giving the mouse a bristly appearance. The upper parts are olive-brown and the underparts are buffish ochre with fewer spines. The tail is dark above and slightly paler below, with rings of scales, and hairs increasing in length towards the tip and ending with a tuft of hairs. The fore feet have five long digits with broad, blunt tips and short, narrow claws that hardly project beyond the tips of the digits. The hind feet are short and broad and have five digits with blunt, calloused tips, the hallux (big toe) being shorter than the others and having a nail rather than a claw. The female has three pairs of mammary glands.

== Distribution ==
The known range consists of four sites on the eastern slopes of the Andes in South America. The sites are in Peru and Bolivia, and the maximum distance between them is 520 km (323 mi), and their altitudinal range 450 to 1,900 m (1,500 to 6,200 ft).

== Ecology ==
This mouse is probably an insectivore. Examination of the stomach contents showed that the diet includes flies, ants and moths, and the short gut and crested teeth reinforce this hypothesis. The morphology of the feet, the forward-pointing eyes and the short snout make it likely that it is an arboreal species. Three of the specimens examined were caught in pitfall traps and the fourth one was a metre above the ground, in a clump of bamboo. The noticeably long tongue may be used to extract insects from crevices, but very little is known of this animal and its natural history.

== Status ==
Although only known from a few isolated records, R. longilingua is listed by the International Union for Conservation of Nature as being of "least concern". This is because of its tolerance of several types of habitats, and because in the absence of any particular threats, it seems unlikely that it is declining at a sufficient rate to qualify for being included in a more threatened category.
