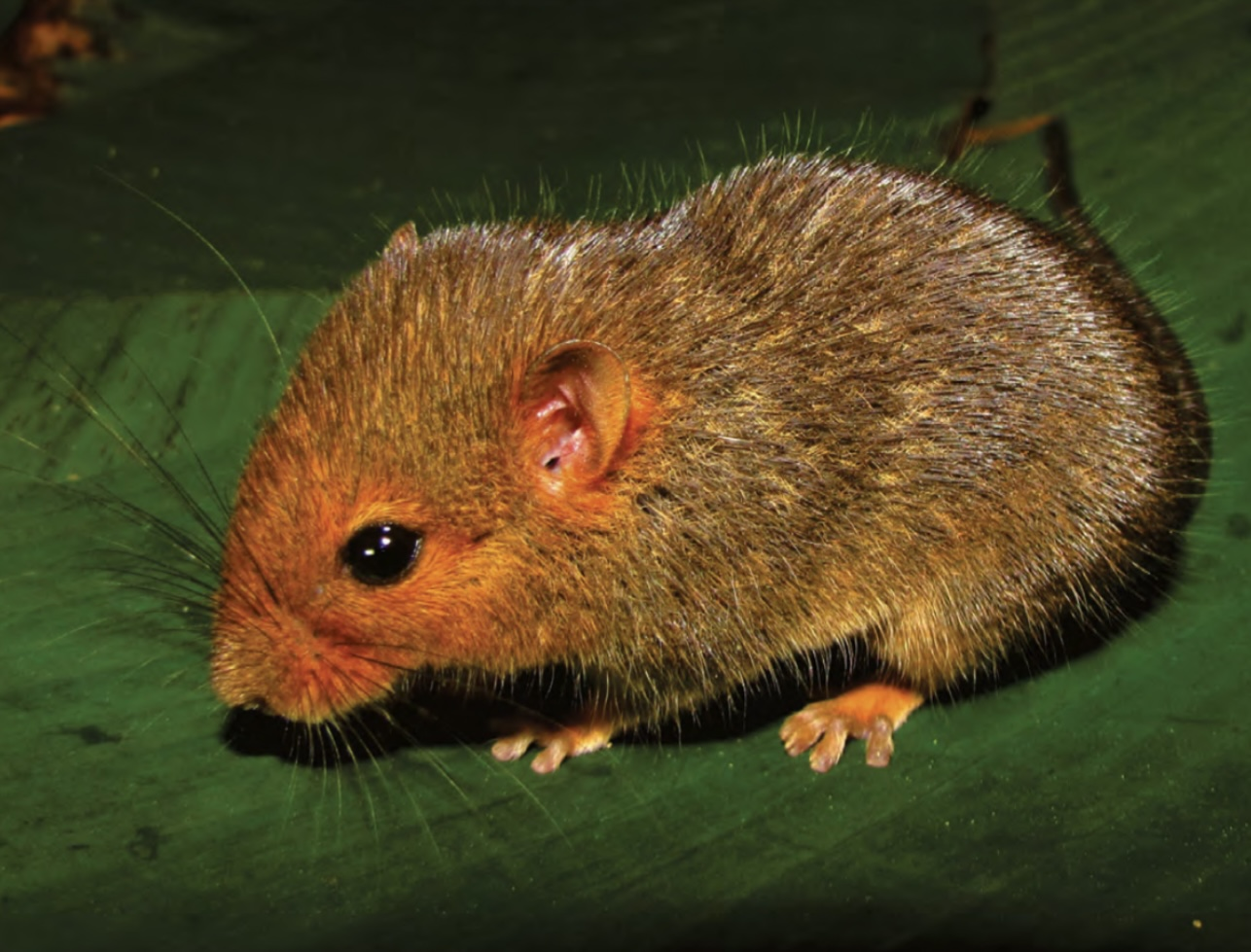
- Rhagomys longilingua

Scientific classification
- Kingdom: Animalia
- Phylum: Chordata
- Class: Mammalia
- Infraclass: Placentalia
- Order: Rodentia
- Family: Cricetidae
- Subfamily: Sigmodontinae
- Tribe: Thomasomyini
- Genus: Rhagomys; Thomas, 1917

Type species
- Hesperomys rufescens Thomas, 1886

Species
- Rhagomys longilingua Rhagomys rufescens

= Rhagomys =

Genus of rodents

Rhagomys is a genus of South American rodents in the tribe Thomasomyini of the family Cricetidae. Two species separated by about 3100 km are known, from southeast Peru and Bolivia east of the Andes, and in the Atlantic Forest of southeast Brazil. An undetermined species of Rhagomys has also been reported from Mato Grosso in central Brazil. The species are as follows:

- Long-tongued arboreal mouse (Rhagomys longilingua)
- Brazilian arboreal mouse (Rhagomys rufescens)

This genus is distinguished from other sigmodontine rodents by the presence of a nail on the hallux. Nuclear DNA sequence analysis has indicated that it is a sister taxon to Thomasomys.

The geographic distribution may reflect a formerly continuous distribution made disjunct by extinctions, or may reflect limited sampling of the intervening areas. While no other mammal taxa have a similar geographic distribution, a group of hylid frogs does. Juscelinomys is an example of another sigmodontine rodent genus that also has a disjunct distribution. Some disjunct distributions have been attributed to fluctuations in forest coverage during the Pleistocene, resulting from the climatic swings of the ice age. However, the report of molars of an unknown member of the genus in an ocelot scat sample from a geographically intermediate location suggests that the disjunct distribution may well be artifact of limited sampling.
