= Serafim Ponte Grande =

1933 book by Oswald de Andrade

- Author: Oswald de Andrade
- Language: Portuguese
- Publication date: 1933
- Publication place: Brazil

Serafim Ponte Grande is a novel by the Brazilian writer Oswald de Andrade. It was first published in 1933, though portions were published earlier in magazines. It has been described as "the complete and powerful application of social satire in Brazil" and "a degenerate invention of a quasi-novel." Andrade also stated that he wrote the novel backwards.
