= Rebanhão =

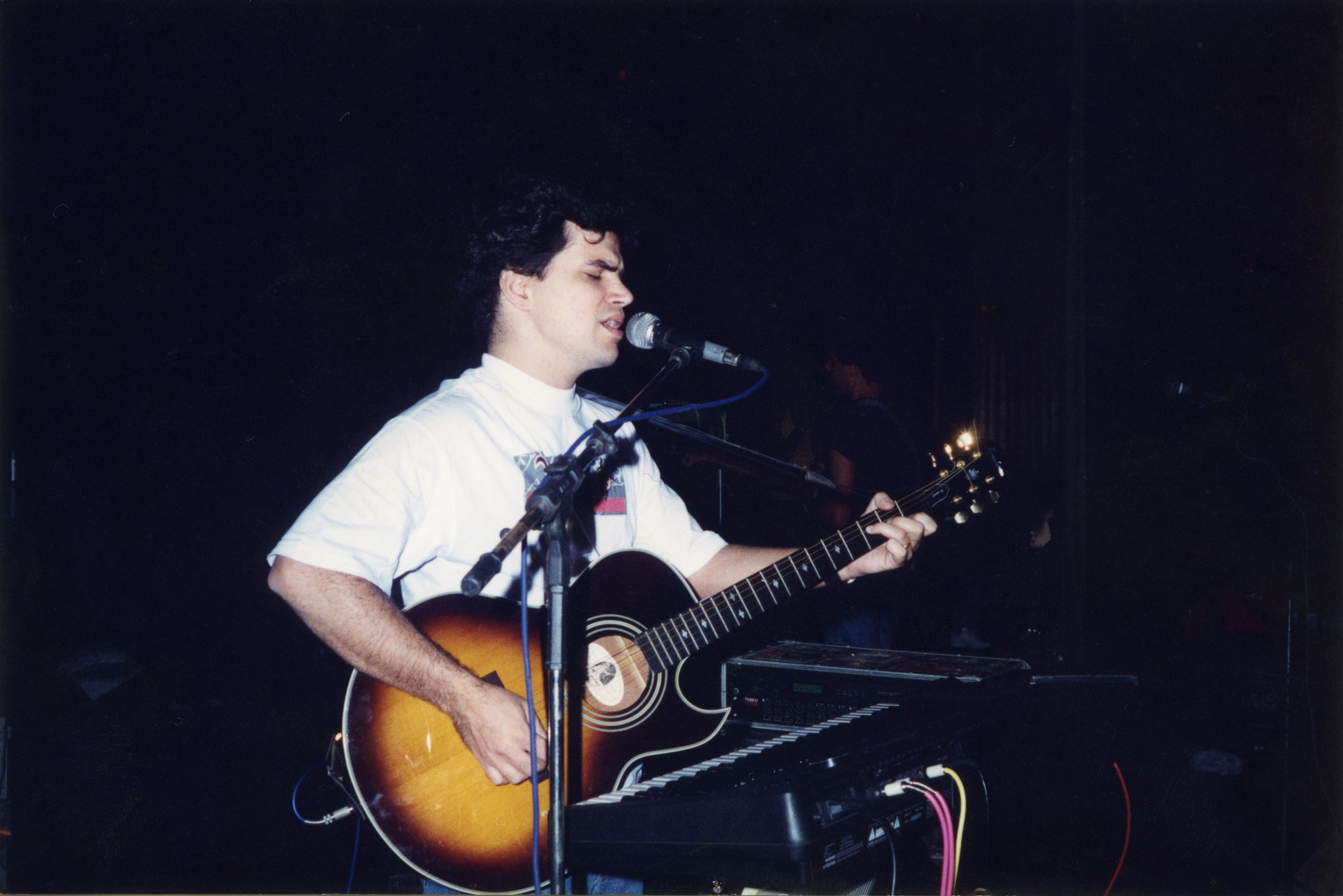
- Pedro Braconnot of Rebanhão band during a concert

Background information
- Origin: Rio de Janeiro, Brazil
- Genres: Christian rock, pop rock, progressive rock, jazz
- Years active: 1979–2000
- Labels: Doce Harmonia (1981-1983); Arca Musical Evangélica (1983-1984); Doce Harmonia (1984-1985); PolyGram (1985-1988); Gospel Records (1989-1994); Warner Music Brasil (1994-1998); Independent (1998-2000)
- Past members: Janires; Carlinhos Felix; Paulo Marotta; Pedro Braconnot; Tutuca

Rebanhão was a Christian rock band from Brazil that had about twenty years of activity. Its founder is the singer and songwriter Janires Magalhães Manso who had just converted to Christianity and with friends in São Paulo created a new rock group that joined poetic lyrics with Christian themes. Soon the musician departed for Rio de Janeiro, where they finally assembled the "Rebanhão" that would be remarkable in Brazil, which would pass through tree distinct phases.

From the album Mais Doce que o Mel, released in 1981, the band became the first in the country to have national notoriety in the genre. Despite the sound and the lyrics were criticized, the songs of Rebanhão attracted young Christians, and the band has achieved a high sales of his first album. The Rebanhão was also responsible for recording the first gospel album live in Brazil, Janires e Amigos in 1984.

The output of the founder and leader of the group, in 1985, made the Rebanhão passed in its second phase and most successful phase in sales. The guitarist and singer Carlinhos Felix served as leader and lead singer, recording several works. After the release of Pé na Estrada, in 1991, Felix decided to go solo career and then keyboardist and only member of the original lineup, Pedro Braconnot took the lead vocals and the Rebanhão. In his contribution, the band released the successful and praised Enquanto é Dia, 1994.

However, with the frequent change of members, and low popularity of the band in the late 90s, Rebanhão released his latest work, Vamos Viver o Amor ended its activities in 2000. However, the band is often cited as one reason for the modernization of Christian music and serving of influence for many musicians of contemporary Christian music.

== Discography ==
=== Studio albums ===
- 1981 - Mais Doce que o Mel (Sweeter than honey)
- 1983 - Luz do Mundo (Light of the World)
- 1985 - Semeador (Sower)
- 1987 - Novo Dia (New day)
- 1989 - Princípio (Principle)
- 1991 - Pé na Estrada (On the Road)
- 1994 - Enquanto é Dia (While it is Day)
- 1996 - Por Cima dos Montes (Over the Hills)
- 1999 - Vamos Viver o Amor (Come Live the Love)

=== Live albums ===
- 1984 - Janires e Amigos (Janires and Friends)

=== Compilations ===
- 1994 - Grandes Momentos (Great Moments)
- 1998 - O Melhor do Rebanhão (The best of Rebanhão)
