= 1978 in Brazil =

Events in the year 1978 in Brazil.

== Incumbents ==
=== Federal government ===
- President: General Ernesto Geisel
- Vice President: General Adalberto Pereira dos Santos

=== Governors ===
- Acre: Vacant
- Alagoas:
  - Divaldo Suruagy (until 14 August)
  - Ernandes Lopes Dorvillé (14 August-14 September)
  - Geraldo Mello (from 14 September)
- Amazonas: Henoch da Silva Reis
- Bahia: Roberto Santos
- Ceará:
  - José Adauto Bezerra (until 28 February)
  - Waldemar Alcântara (from 28 February)
- Espírito Santo: Élcio Álvares
- Goiás: Irapuan Costa Jr.
- Maranhão: Oswaldo da Costa Nunes Freire
- Mato Grosso:
  - Jose Garcia Neto (until 14 August)
  - Cássio Leite de Barros (from 14 August)
- Mato Grosso do Sul: Vacant
- Minas Gerais:
  - Aureliano Chaves (until 9 July)
  - Levindo Ozanan Coelho (from 9 July)
- Pará:
  - Aloysio Chaves (until 1 August)
  - Clóvis Rego (from 1 August)
- Paraíba:
  - Ivan Bichara (until 14 August)
  - Dorgival Terceiro Neto (from 14 August)
- Paraná: Jaime Canet Júnior
- Pernambuco: Francisco Moura Cavalcanti
- Piauí:
  - Dirceu Arcoverde (until 14 August)
  - Djalma Veloso (from 14 August)
- Rio de Janeiro: Floriano P. Faria Lima
- Rio Grande do Norte: Tarcisio de Vasconcelos Maia
- Rio Grande do Sul: Sinval Sebastião Duarte Guazzelli
- Santa Catarina: Antônio Carlos Konder Reis
- São Paulo: Paulo Egídio Martins
- Sergipe: José Rollemberg

=== Vice governors ===
- Acre: Omar Sabino de Paula
- Alagoas: Antônio Guedes Amaral (from 14 September)
- Amazonas: João Bosco Ramos de Lima
- Bahia: Edvaldo Brandão Correia
- Ceará:
  - José Waldemar de Alcântara e Silva (until 1 March)
  - Vacant thereafter (from 1 March)
- Espírito Santo: Carlos Alberto Lindenberg von Schilgen
- Goiás: José Luís Bittencourt
- Maranhão: José Duailibe Murad
- Mato Grosso:
  - Cássio Leite de Barros (until 14 August)
  - Vacant thereafter (from 14 August)
- Mato Grosso do Sul: Vacant
- Minas Gerais:
  - Levindo Ozanam Coelho (until 5 July)
  - Vacant thereafter (from 5 July)
- Pará:
  - Clovis Silva de Morais Rego (until 1 August)
  - Vacant thereafter (from 1 August)
- Paraíba:
  - Dorgival Terceiro Neto (until 14 August)
  - Vacant thereafter (from 14 August)
- Paraná: Octávio Cesário Pereira Júnior
- Pernambuco: Paulo Gustavo de Araújo Cunha
- Piauí:
  - Djalma Martins Veloso (until 14 August)
  - Vacant thereafter (from 14 August)
- Rio de Janeiro: Vacant
- Rio Grande do Norte: Geraldo Melo
- Rio Grande do Sul: José Augusto Amaral de Sousa
- Santa Catarina: Marcos Henrique Büechler
- São Paulo: Ferreira Filho
- Sergipe: Antônio Ribeiro Sotelo

== Events ==
=== March ===
- March 29-31: United States President Jimmy Carter makes his three-day visit to Brazil and is the fifth US president to visit the country.

=== July ===
- July 8: A fire destroys the art collection at the Museum of Modern Art in Rio de Janeiro.

=== August ===
- August 4: President Ernesto Geisel signs a national decree, that prohibits strikes in the sectors of national security and public services.

=== September ===
- September 6: Dr. Roberto Farina is sentenced to two years in prison for performing Brazil's first male-to-female gender-affirming surgery.

=== October ===
- October 13: The National Congress of Brazil grants Constitutional Amendment No. 11, which would repeal the Institutional Act No. 5.
- October 16: General João Batista Figueiredo is elected President of Brazil by the electoral college.
- October 27: A federal judge delivers a judgement, establishing that journalist Vladimir Herzog was wrongfully detained and tortured under the premises of the DOI-CODI.

=== December ===
- December 29: President Ernesto Geisel signs a decree that lifts the banning of over a hundred Brazilians living abroad as political exiles. The decree also extinguishes the General Commission of Investigations.

== Births ==
=== January ===
- January 4: André Neles, footballer (died 2020)
- January 19: Eryk Rocha, director and screenwriter
- January 29: Joice Hasselmann, journalist, writer, activist and conservative political commentator

=== March ===
- March 7: Jaqueline Jesus, psychologist and activist
- March 18: Fernandão, Brazilian footballer and manager (d. 2014)

=== May ===
- May 8: Lúcio, footballer
- May 18: Helton, football manager and former player
- May 10: Marcelo Moretto, footballer
- May 30: Lyoto Machida, mixed martial artist

=== June ===
- June 23: Leandro Firmino, actor
- June 28: Baiano, footballer

=== July ===
- July 4: Marcos Daniel, tennis player
- July 17: Ricardo Arona, mixed martial artist
- July 20: André Bankoff, actor

=== August ===
- August 31: Regiane Alves, actress

=== September ===
- September 16: Emerson Sheik, association footballer
- September 16: Carolina Dieckmann, actress

=== November ===
- 6 November: Daniella Cicarelli, Brazilian model
- 25 November: Taís Araújo, actress

== Deaths ==
- 17 March - Iracema de Alencar, actress (born 1900)
- 10 October -Hermes Lima, prime minister and foreign minister of Brazil (born 1902)

== See also ==
- 1978 in Brazilian football
- 1978 in Brazilian television
