= A Marcha das Utopias =

- Author: Oswald de Andrade
- Language: Portuguese
- Publication date: 1953
- Publication place: Brazil

A Marcha das Utopias is a Portuguese-language essay on the theme of utopia by Brazilian author Oswald de Andrade.

Andrade originally submitted the essay as a master's thesis in 1950; it was declined by the Faculty of Philosophy of the University of São Paulo. In 1953, he published it as part of a series of articles in the newspaper O Estado de S. Paulo. It has been frequently reprinted, including a posthumous edition by Brazil's Ministry of Education and Culture (MEC) in 1966.

The theme of utopia in relation to the Americas is one Andrade returned to through his career. In this essay he considers how the idea of utopia has affected the history of the Americas, and whether it can be appropriated as a tool of resistance.
