= Verdão =

Former stadium in Cuiabá, Brazil

Coordinates: 15°36′11″S 56°07′14″W

Estádio Governador José Fragelli
- Verdão
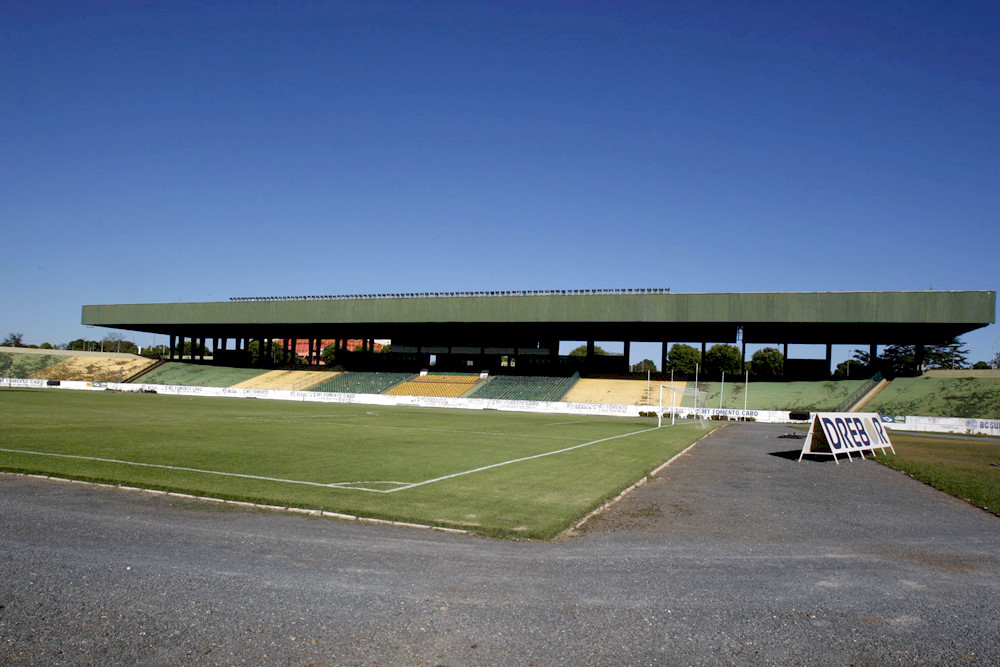
- The stadium on launch day of its demolition 8 August 2009
- Interactive map of Estádio Governador José Fragelli
- Location: Av. Prof. Ranulfo Paes de Barros, 478, Cidade Alta, Cuiabá (MT)
- Owner: Government of the State of Mato Grosso
- Operator: Government of the State of Mato Grosso
- Capacity: 55,000

Construction
- Opened: April 8, 1976
- Closed: 2009
- Demolished: 2010

Tenants
- Berga; Cuiabá; Dom Bosco; Mixto; Operário (VG)

Estádio Governador José Fragelli, usually known as Verdão, was a multi-purpose stadium in Cuiabá, Brazil. The stadium, used mostly for football matches, holds 55,000, and was built in 1976. It was replaced by a new stadium in the city, seating about 44,097, that was used for the 2014 FIFA World Cup.

Verdão is owned by the Mato Grosso state government. The stadium was named after José Fragelli, who was the Mato Grosso's governor from 1970 until 1974, during the time of the stadium's construction. Verdão means Big Green in the Portuguese language. It was the home stadium of Mixto, Dom Bosco and Operário.

== History ==
Construction started in 1973, The stadium had a planned capacity of 50,000 individuals and architectural design of Silvano Wendel, Verdão was the reason for harsh criticism of the administration of Fragelli. Budgeted at Cr$1,200,000.00, currency of the time, the work that was started in the Government Jose Fragelli, was finally completed in 1976, now in administration José Garcia Neto.

On March 12, 1975, the team of Fluminense and selection of Cuiaba faced in the match celebrating the partial completion of works at the opportunity when the team made history Cuiabá swinging for the first time the networks' Verdão. The following year, April 8, the stadium was finely finished with the presence of Flamengo and a square between the clubs in the capital, Mixto, Worker and Don Bosco, attended by over 44,000 fans.

In 1976, the construction work on Verdão was completed. The inaugural match was played on April 8 of that year, when Mixto beat Dom Bosco 2-0. The first goal of the stadium was scored by Mixto's Pastoril. The stadium's attendance record currently stands at 44,021, set in the inaugural match.

On August 9, 1980, the stadium entertained its biggest result, when Mixto beat Humaitá 14-0. Mixto's striker Elmo scored eight goals in this match.

== World Cup 2014 ==
Brazil won the right to host the 2014 FIFA World Cup, and Cuiabá was one of 18 cities bidding to host it. The state government planned to invest $250 million to build a new stadium in the place of Verdão. Cuiabá was announced as one of the 12 host cities on May 31, 2009.

Demolition of Verdão started on April 26, 2010, and was completed later the same year. The new stadium, Arena Pantanal, was built adjacent to the stadium's former site.

== See also ==
- 2014 FIFA World Cup
