= List of Brazilian films of 1944 =

A list of films produced in Brazil in 1944:

Title	Director	Cast	Genre	Notes
Abacaxi Azul	Ruy Costa, Wallace Downey	Alvarenga, Ranchinho, Duarte de Moraes	Musical comedy	
Berlin to the Samba Beat	Luiz de Barros	Procópio Ferreira, Delorges Caminha, Chocolate	Musical comedy	
Brazil	Joseph Santley	Tito Guízar, Virginia Bruce, Robert Livingston	Musical romantic comedy	American film shot in Brazil
Corações Sem Piloto	Luiz de Barros	Aimée, Afonso Stuart, Juvenal Fontes	Comedy	
Gente Honesta	Moacyr Fenelon	Oscarito, Mário Brasini, Vanda Lacerda		
É Proibido Sonhar	Moacyr Fenelon	Mesquitinha, Lourdinha Bittencourt, Mário Brasini	Drama	
Esforço de Guerra do Brasil	Jurandyr Passos Noronha			
O Brasileiro João de Souza	Bob Chust	Sandro Roberto, Zezé Pimentel, Zbigniew Ziembinski	War drama	
Romance de um Mordedor	José Carlos Burle	Maria Batista, Iris Belmonte, Emilinha Borba	Comedy	
Romance Proibido	Adhemar Gonzaga	Milton Marinho, Lúcia Lamar, Nilza Magrassi	Drama	

== See also ==
- 1944 in Brazil
