= Manifesto Pau-Brasil =

Manifesto of Pau-Brasil Poetry
- 1991 edition
- Author: Oswald de Andrade
- Language: Portuguese
- Publication date: 1924
- Publication place: Brazil

Manifesto da Poesia Pau-Brasil ('Manifesto of Pau-Brasil Poetry,' also translated as 'Manifesto of Brazilwood Poetry') is a Portuguese language article by Brazilian author, Oswald de Andrade. It was first published in the Correio da Manha on March 18, 1924 with the Portuguese title "Manifesto da poesia pau-brasil." An English language translation by Stella m. de sa Rego was published in the Latin American Literary Review, vol. XIV, no. 27, Jan – June 1986, pg 184 - 187.
