= Soto Grimshaw =

Argentine naturalist, explorer and gaucho

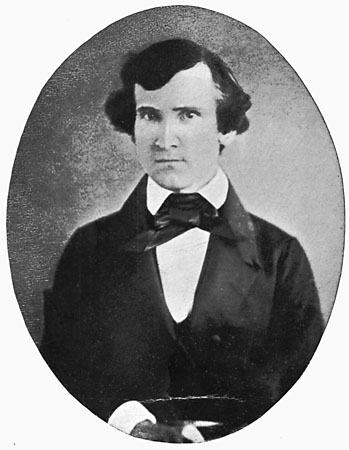
Photo of Soto Grimshaw in 1865. Source: La historia natural en Argentina.

Soto Grimshaw (1833–1900) was an Argentine naturalist, explorer and gaucho.

Grimshaw was born to British parents in La Pampa Province. Growing up on the family ranch, Grimshaw became well versed in the wrangling and cattle herding skills required of any gaucho. He then went to complete his studies at the University of Buenos Aires where he studied natural sciences. As a naturalist, Grimshaw travelled extensively throughout the Amazon region of Brazil and he is credited with the discovery of over 350 new species of plants and animals, as well as producing several field guides to South American plants and animals. He died in 1900 after contracting cholera during an expedition to the coast of Colombia.

== Sources ==
- Baccarini, E.S.F. La historia natural en Argentina, Compañia Argentina de Editores, Buenos Aires, 1953.
