= Oswald de Andrade =

Brazilian poet novelist and cultural critic

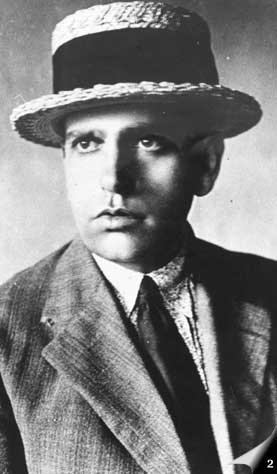
- Andrade in 1920
- Born: José Oswald de Souza Andrade; January 11, 1890; São Paulo, Brazil
- Died: October 22, 1954 (aged 64); São Paulo, Brazil
- Occupations: poet and polemicist
- Writing career
- Notable works: Manifesto Pau-Brasil (1924); Pau-Brasil (poems, 1925); A Estrela de Absinto (1927); Manifesto Antropófago (1928); Meu Testamento (1944); A Arcádia e a Inconfidência (1945); A Crise da Filosofia Messiânica (1950); Um Aspecto Antropofágico da Cultura Brasileira: O Homem Cordial (1950); A Marcha das Utopias (1953)
- Literary movement: Founder of Brazilian modernism; member of the Group of Five

José Oswald de Souza Andrade (January 11, 1890 – October 22, 1954) was a Brazilian poet, novelist and cultural critic. He was born in, spent most of his life in, and died in São Paulo.

Andrade was one of the founders of Brazilian modernism and a member of the Group of Five, along with Mário de Andrade, Anita Malfatti, Tarsila do Amaral and Menotti del Picchia. He participated in the Modern Art Week (Semana de Arte Moderna).

== Biography ==
Born into a wealthy bourgeois family in São Paulo, Andrade used his money and connections to support numerous modernist artists and projects. He sponsored the publication of several major novels of the period, produced a number of experimental plays, and supported several painters, including Tarsila do Amaral, with whom he had a long affair, and Lasar Segall.

Andrade joined the Communist Party in 1931, but left it, disillusioned, in 1945. He remained controversial for his radical political views and his often belligerent outspokenness. His role in the modernist art community was made somewhat awkward by his feud with Mário de Andrade, which lasted from 1929 (after Oswald de Andrade published a pseudonymous essay mocking Mário for effeminacy) until Mário de Andrade's untimely death in 1945.

== Manifesto Antropófago ==
Andrade is particularly important for his Manifesto Antropófago (Anthropophagist Manifesto), published in 1928. Its argument is that colonized countries, such as Brazil, should ingest the culture of the colonizer and digest it in its own way. The text is explicitly inspired by Michel de Montaigne, Karl Marx, Sigmund Freud and André Breton, and is composed through a procedure of "deglutition" of some of the most renowned manifestos of the Western culture, such as the Manifesto of the Communist Party and the Surrealist Manifesto. Andrade distinguishes Anthropophagy from cannibalism (low anthropophagy) on the grounds that the former is a ritualistic practice to be found among indigenous peoples in Brazil; in this ritual sense, Anthropophagy functions as a rite of incorporation of the world-view of the ingested enemy.

By turning Anthropophagy into the motto of a manifesto, Andrade operates an inversion through which he affirms as the leitmotiv of a cultural movement precisely those practices based on which several indigenous peoples were considered as barbarians deprived of culture. Anthropophagy becomes thus a way for the former colony to assert itself against European postcolonial cultural domination. The manifesto's iconic line is "Tupi or not Tupi: that is the question." The line is simultaneously a celebration of the Tupi, who had been at times accused of cannibalism (most notoriously by Hans Staden), and an instance of the anthropophagical rite: it eats Shakespeare. Antropofagia, as a movement, has a significant impact in multiple domains of Brazilian culture, such as theater (Teatro Oficina), music (Tropicalismo) and cinema (Cinema Novo). As a consequence, some authors such as Augusto de Campos and Eduardo Viveiros de Castro consider it as Brazil's most radical artistic movement and as the only "original philosophy" produced in the country. On the other hand, some critics argue that Antropofagia, as a movement, was too heterogeneous to extract overarching arguments from it and that often it had little to do with a post-colonial cultural politics (Jauregui 2018, 2012).

== Selected works ==
- Alma (1922)
- Manifesto Pau-Brasil (1924)
- Pau-Brasil (poems, 1925)
- A Estrela de Absinto (1927)
- Manifesto Antropófago (1928)
- Serafim Ponte Grande (1933)
- Meu Testamento (1944)
- A Arcádia e a Inconfidência (1945)
- A Crise da Filosofia Messiânica (1950)
- Um Aspecto Antropofágico da Cultura Brasileira: O Homem Cordial (1950)
- A Marcha das Utopias (1953)

== Sources ==
In English:

- Garcia, Luis Fellipe. "Only Anthropophagy unites us – Oswald de Andrade's Decolonial Project", in Cultural Studies 34:1 (2020): 122–142.
- Jauregui, Carlos, A. "Antropofagia", in Irwin, Robert McKee, and Szurmuk, Mónica (eds.), Dictionary of Latin American Cultural Studies. Gainesville, FL: The University Press of Florida (2012): 22–28.

In Portuguese:

- Azevedo, Beatriz. Antropofagia - Palimpsesto Selvagem. São Paulo: Cosac Naify, 2016.
- Boaventura, Maria Eugenia. A Vanguarda Antropofágica. São Paulo: Ática, 1985.
- Helena, Lúcia. Totens e tabus da modernidade brasileira: símbolo e alegoria na obra de Oswald de Andrade. Rio de Janeiro: Tempo Brasileiro. 1985.
- Justino, Maria José. O Banquete Canibal: A modernidade em Tarsila do Amaral 1886-1973. Curitiba, Brazil: Editora UFPR, 2002.
- Nunes, Benedito. Oswald Canibal. São Paulo: Perspectiva, 1979.
- Nunes, Benedito. A Utopia Antropofágica: A Antropofagia ao alcance de todos. São Paulo: Globo, 1990.
- Netto, Adriano Bitarães. Antropofagia Oswaldiana: Um Receituário Estético e Científico. São Paulo: Annablume, 2004.
- Morais Junior, Luís Carlos de Lui Morais. O Olho do Ciclope e os Novos Antropófagos: Antropofagia Cinematótica na Literatura Brasileira. Rio de Janeiro: Quártica Editora, 2009.

In Spanish:

- Jauregui, Carlos A. Canibalia. Canibalismo, calibanismo, antropofagia cultural y consumo en América Latina. Premio Casa de las Américas. Madrid, Spain: Vervuert, ETC: Ensayos de Teoría Cultural 1, 2008.
