= TV Paranaíba =

TV Paranaíba (ZYQ 805)
- Uberlândia, Minas Gerais; Brazil
- Channels: Digital: 28; Virtual: 10
- Branding: TV Paranaíba

Programming
- Affiliations: Record

Ownership
- Owner: Grupo Paranaíba; (Rádio e Televisão de Uberlândia Ltda.)
- Sister stations: Educadora FM; Paranaíba FM

History
- First air date: June 28, 1978; 48 years ago
- Former call signs: ZYA 727 (1978–2018)
- Former names: TV Triângulo (1964–1995); TV Integração (1995–2001); Rede Integração Uberlândia (2001–2009)
- Former channel numbers: Analog: 10 (VHF, 1978–2018)
- Former affiliations: Rede Bandeirantes (1978–2003)

Technical information
- Licensing authority: ANATEL
- ERP: 1.8 kW
- Transmitter coordinates: 18°53′6.9″S 48°15′30.2″W

Links
- Public license information: Profile
- Website: tvparanaiba.com.br

TV Paranaíba (channel 10) is a Record-affiliated television station licensed to Uberlândia, Minas Gerais, owned by Grupo Paranaíba. The station covers the western area of the state, including the Triângulo Mineiro area, for a total of 89 municipalities.

== History ==
The license for VHF channel 10 in Uberlândia was granted through decree nº 75.312, signed by president Ernesto Geisel on 28 January 1975, to a group led by Ary de Castro Santos, who had as his aides Virgílio Galassi, Nicomedes Alves dos Santos, Ruy Castro Santos, Branly Macêdo de Oliveira and Adib Chueiri. After three and a half years, TV Paranaíba started broadcasting on 28 June 1978, as a Rede Bandeirantes affiliate. The station was the first in the Triângulo Mineiro area to use microwave links, using Companhia de Telecomunicações do Brasil Central's infrastructure networks, and, from 1982, started carrying the network's programming via satellite.

On 1 February 2003, TV Paranaíba left Rede Bandeirantes after nearly 25 years, and joined Rede Record. AThe switch was motivated after problems the station and the network faced since 2001, and in the midst of Band's decision to rent an hour of its primetime schedule to the International Grace of God Church (to carry Show da Fé), which caused problems among some its affiliates and threatened some partnerships. It was estimated that as of the time of the affiliation switch, TV Paranaíba covered 39 cities of the Triângulo Mineiro and Alto Paranaíba regions, for a potential audience of around two million viewers.

The station shut down its analog signal on VHF channel 10 on 17 December 2018, alongside other Uberlândia stations, according to the official ANATEL roadmap.
