= Berga Esporte Clube =

Berga
- Full name: Berga Esporte Clube
- Founded: April 13, 1983 (41 years ago)
- Dissolved: 2005
- Ground: Verdão, Cuiabá, Mato Grosso state, Brazil
- Capacity: 40,000
Home colors	Away colors

Berga Esporte Clube, commonly known as Berga, was a Brazilian football club based in Cuiabá, Mato Grosso state.

== History ==
The club was founded on April 13, 1983, as Treze Esporte Clube, it was renamed to Berga Esporte Clube on April 1, 1999, after the club was bought by businessman Ettore Bergamaschi. The club folded in 2005, after he died.

== Stadium ==
Berga Esporte Clube played their home games at Verdão. The stadium has a maximum capacity of 40,000 people.
