= Mayky Vilaça =

Brazilian politician (born 1988)

Member of the Legislative Assembly of Pará
- Incumbent
- Assumed office 1 February 2027

Personal details
- Born: 1 May 1988 (age 38)
- Party: Liberal Party (since 2024)

Mayky Tayly Guimarães Franco (born 1 May 1988), better known as Mayky Vilaça, is a Brazilian politician who was elected member of the Legislative Assembly of Pará in 2026. He has been a municipal councillor of Belém since 2025.
