= 1953 in Brazil =

Events in the year 1953 in Brazil.

== Incumbents ==
=== Federal government ===
- President: Getúlio Vargas
- Vice President: Café Filho

=== Governors ===
- Alagoas: Arnon de Mello
- Amazonas: Álvaro Botelho Maia
- Bahia: Régis Pacheco
- Ceará: Raul Barbosa
- Espírito Santo: Francisco Alves Ataíde
- Goiás: Pedro Ludovico Teixeira
- Mato Grosso: Fernando Corrêa da Costa
- Minas Gerais: Juscelino Kubitschek
- Pará: Zacarias de Assumpção
- Paraíba: José Américo de Almeida
- Paraná: Bento Munhoz da Rocha Neto
- Pernambuco: Etelvino Lins de Albuquerque
- Piauí: Pedro Freitas
- Rio de Janeiro: Amaral Peixoto
- Rio Grande do Norte: Silvio Piza Pedrosa
- Rio Grande do Sul: Ildo Meneghetti
- Santa Catarina: Irineu Bornhausen
- São Paulo: Lucas Nogueira Garcez
- Sergipe: Arnaldo Rollemberg Garcez

=== Vice governors ===
- Alagoas: Antônio Guedes de Miranda
- Ceará: Stênio Gomes da Silva
- Espírito Santo: Francisco Alves Ataíde
- Goiás: Jonas Ferreira Alves Duarte
- Maranhão: Renato Bayma Archer da Silva
- Mato Grosso: João Leite de Barros
- Minas Gerais: Clóvis Salgado da Gama
- Paraíba: João Fernandes de Lima
- Piauí: Tertuliano Milton Brandão
- Rio de Janeiro: Tarcísio Miranda
- Rio Grande do Norte: Vacant
- São Paulo: Erlindo Salzano
- Sergipe: Edelzio Vieira de Melo

== Events ==
- Date Unknown: JBS Group, a worldwide meat processing brand, was founded in Goiás.

=== January ===
- January 20: Lima Barreto's film O Cangaceiro is released in cinemas.

=== March ===
- March 23: The Brazilian branch of the German automaker Volkswagen is established in São Bernardo do Campo.

=== April ===
- April 1: The Brazilian football team is defeated 3-2 by Paraguay at the Estadio Nacional, Lima, to finish second in the 1953 South American Championship.

=== June ===
- June 30: The naval destroyer escort USS Pennewill (DE-175) is transferred from the United States to Brazilian ownership, taking on the new name Bertioga (BE–1).

=== July ===
- July 25: The Ministry of Health is created.

=== September ===
- September 27: RecordTV is launched in São Paulo.

=== October ===
- October 3: President Getúlio Vargas signs the law that creates the state-owned multinational corporation Petrobras.

== Births ==
=== March ===
- 3 March: Zico, footballer and coach

=== April ===
- 22 April: Lucinha Turnbull, singer, composer and guitarist

=== May ===
- 4 May: Lulu Santos, singer and guitarist
- 23 May: Armandinho, composer and singer

== Deaths ==
=== March ===
- 20 March: Graciliano Ramos, writer (born 1892)

=== November ===
- 15 November: Jorge de Lima, writer (born 1893)
- 2 December – Miguel Osório de Almeida, physician and scientist (born 1890)

== See also ==
- 1953 in Brazilian football
