= Janires =

Brazilian singer (1953–1988)

- Also known as: Jaja
- Born: Janires Magalhães Manso; May 22, 1953; Vitória, Espírito Santo, Brazil
- Died: January 11, 1988 (aged 34) Três Rios, Rio de Janeiro, Brazil
- Genres: MPB; Baião; Christian rock; Psychedelic rock; Progressive rock; Folk rock; Pop rock
- Instruments: Classical guitar; guitar; piano; vocals
- Years active: 1979–1988
- Formerly of: Rebanhão, Banda Azul, João Alexandre

Janires "Jaja" Magalhães Manso (Portuguese pronunciation: [ʒɐˈniɾis maɡaˈʎɐ̃j̃s ˈmɐ̃su]; May 22, 1953 – January 11, 1988) was a Brazilian singer, songwriter, music producer, arranger and multi-instrumentalist. He began his career in the late 1970s, and is best known as the person responsible for the modernization of Christian music that occurred in the 1980s. Born into a poor family and the son of a single mother, he spent part of his youth in strong contact with music, and later began to use drugs. After being arrested and spending some time in a halfway house, he became a Christian and returned to his musical activities.

He was the founder and one of the vocalists of Rebanhão, the first Christian rock band in Brazil to achieve national notoriety. In the band, he composed several songs, among which "Baião" and "Casinha" stand out. The group's first work was Mais Doce que o Mel, released in 1981 and which was criticized by religious leaders for using sounds that were previously forbidden in churches, such as distorted guitars and lyrics contextualized with the social and economic reality of the time. However, the band was a success with the young public, presenting a new musicality for that generation. Janires' last work in the group was the album Janires e Amigos, considered the first Christian album recorded live in Brazil, released in 1985. After that, he left the group, but always keeping in touch with its members.

After leaving Rebanhão, he moved to Belo Horizonte, where he started a radio program, besides doing evangelization work with young people at the movement Youth for Christ (Mocidade para Cristo). At the same time, he founded the Banda Azul, which even before releasing its first album already had a certain notoriety in the segment. Unfortunately, before the release of Espelho nos Olhos, Janires was victim of a fatal traffic accident in January 1988, and his body was buried in Brasília. His work released that year was greatly acclaimed by the public.

Even with his short career, the singer is considered one of the greatest composers of contemporary Christian music and his works have been re-recorded by several musicians, besides being an influence to others. In recognition of his contribution to music, he was honored by various ensembles and artists in a live event recorded on CD, entitled Tributo a Janires.

== Early life ==
Janires Magalhães Manso was born in Vitória, Espírito Santo in May 22, 1953. He never met his biological father and lived his early life with his mother Luzia. Since his childhood he did not understand his mother's explanations and advice, and ended up getting involved with drugs at the age of twelve, living this reality for about seven years.

He was arrested in the act. However, thanks to the help of his mother and another woman, he managed to be transferred to the Youth Challenge Program (Programa Desafio Jovem) in Brasília. With the support of a teacher named Gaudino, the future musician and his mother learned about Christianity in the program. Janires stayed there for nine months, forming bonds with the people who worked in that place. However, he had to go through a trial, where he was sentenced to one year in prison and payment of eleven salaries. However, his name was exchanged with that of another inmate, and Janires ended up returning to the youth program.

In the program, he became active in music, writing his first Christian compositions, and remained there until he was freed. Janires' old friends came looking for him again, and he couldn't resist going back to drugs. After six months, Arlete, the coordinator of Desafio Jovem and a great friend of the singer, took him to São Paulo, where he attended Uncle Cássio's church and finally became a Protestant.

== Career ==
=== Beginning and formation of the Rebellion (1975–1979) ===
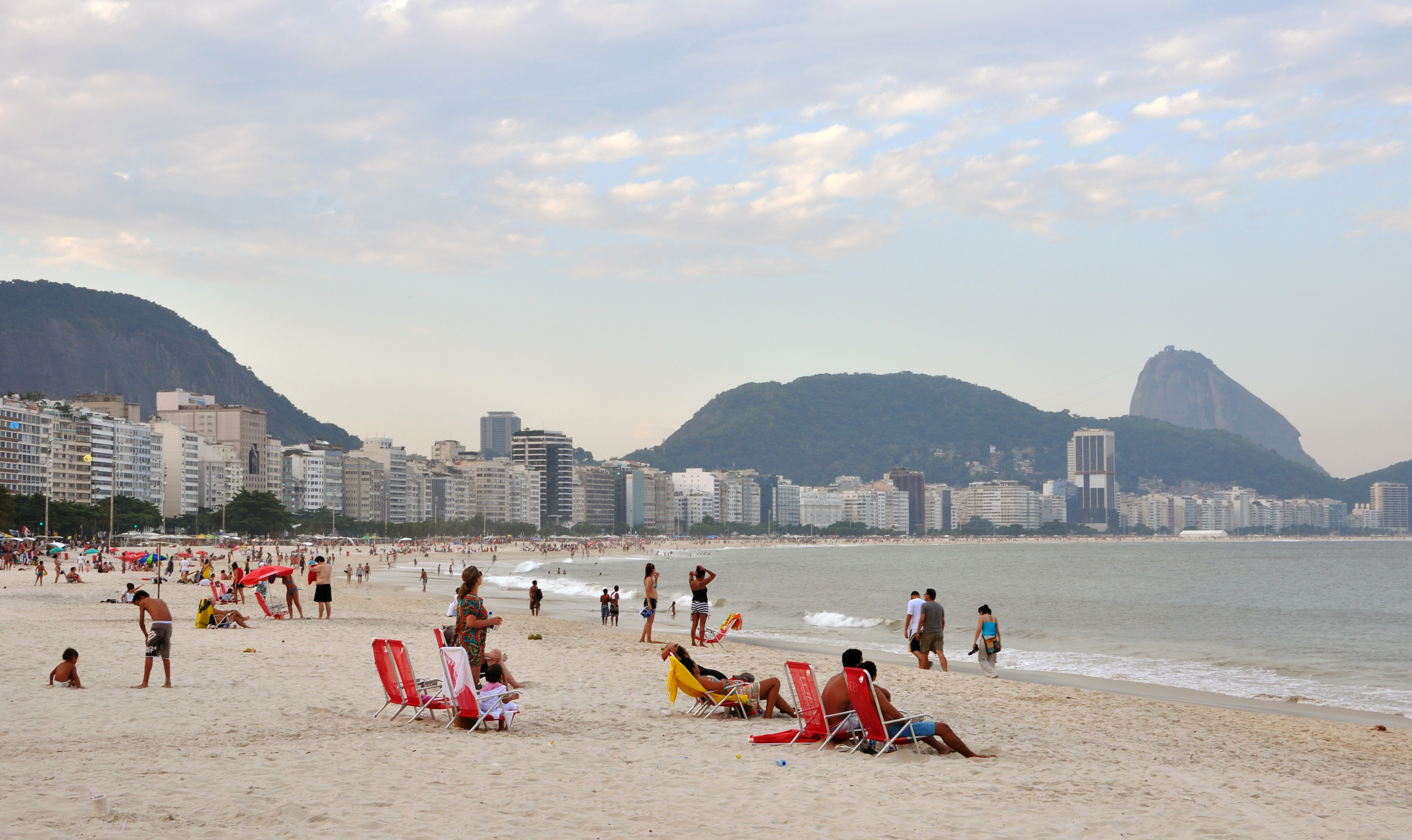
Copacabana, the neighborhood where the church that Janires attended was located.

In São Paulo, he formed a group called "Rebanhão", consisting of Janires Magalhães on vocals and guitar; Jerubal Liasch on drums; Jeziel Liasch and Mike on bass; Pipa and Carrá on percussion; and Neidinha on keyboards. Later he left the group and moved to Rio de Janeiro with his belongings, where he met Pedro Braconnot, who would be his follower and one of the future leaders of the new Rebanhão.

One day, the two of them went to watch a rehearsal of several musicians, namely Paulo Marotta, Kandel Rocha and André Marien. Pedro and Janires invited them to join the new band he was forming, and they accepted. To finish, the group included the guitarist and singer Carlinhos Félix.

Paulo Marotta tells that he met the founder of the Rebanhão in 1979 in meetings at the Presbyterianism church in Copacabana, and that his appearance was totally against the beauty standards of that time: dark brown and unkempt hair, thin and slender, wearing a faded jeans jumpsuit. His teeth were white and his smile, according to him, was unmistakable. His words were different and good, joining his life experiences, and his compositions always brought words of praise to Jesus. His sermons were sometimes very different from what preachers used to give, often harsh. Just as he appeared, he disappeared. Marotta also tells that with Janires' belongings he had several copies in cassette tape of the band he formed in São Paulo, with several songs that would later be part of the first work of that band.

The cover of the tape, on satin cardboard with the gold print of the silhouette of a shepherd with a staff in his hand and a sheep at his side, said it all. On the smaller flap the titles: "Jesus, Filho do Homem", "Baião", "Casinha", "Arco-Iris" were a small sample of the genius of its composer.

The tape was absolutely revolutionary. The repertoire was eclectic: an original mix of rural rock, tending toward the progressive, with bucolic songs laden with poetic phrasing.

=== Mais Doce que o Mel, Luz do Mundo and Janires e Amigos (1981–1985) ===
Marotta also said that in Rebanhão, everyone had freedom to produce, and that Janires was totally unusual. However, the recording of the group's first work was involved in several difficulties. Mais Doce que o Mel was released by the Doce Harmonia recording company in 1981, with a repercussion that exceeded the expectations of the members. From then on, Rebanhão became known, but also had its work criticized for mixing rhythms and using instruments forbidden inside most churches, also accused of containing subliminal messages. However, Mais Doce que o Mel sold over one hundred and fifty thousand copies in Brazil. The LP's repertoire contained several songs written by Janires, such as "Baião" and "Casinha", which became some of his best known compositions in the Christian environment.

In 1983, the group's second album, Luz do Mundo, was released, in which the singer also participated. Launched in the middle of the military dictatorship in Brazil, Janires ironized the policies and the management of the military government. In this Rebanhão record, he expresses his opinion clearly in verses of the song "Casa no Céu": "There will be no neighbors complaining about the increase in gas prices there", "There will be no holes in the middle of the street there", "There will be no pickpockets or thieves disrespecting the 80km/h speed limit, fleeing from pollution there". In the same work he criticizes the way people live, as in the song "Hoje sou Feliz", where he says: "And I found out that I live in a South American country full of supermen flying and drinking from bar to bar, that artists seduce girls and good guys and bad guys are killing each other on the street corners, oh, how it hurts, to know that what is going on in the country it is not a child's dream".

In December 1984, Rebanhão recorded the first live album in Brazilian Christian music, the LP Janires e Amigos, recorded in the auditorium of Rádio Boas Novas to commemorate the ten years of Janires' conversion, where the singer, along with band members, paid homage to several friends. The record was released in 1985.

=== Banda Azul and Espelho nos Olhos (1985–1987) ===
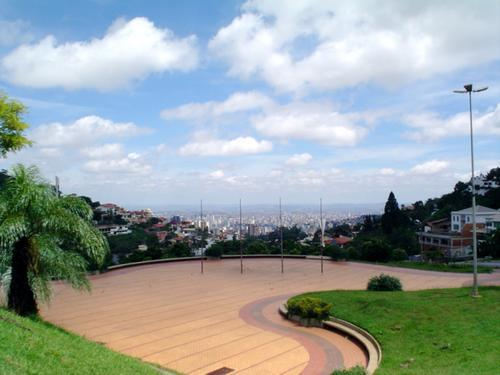
Israel Pinheiro Square, one of the places where Banda Azul performed before the recording of Espelho nos Olhos.

After the recording of Janires e Amigos, Janires left Rebanhão, going to Belo Horizonte, where he founded the Banda Azul. According to Paulo Marotta, his departure caused pain for the members that remained, since he was the founder and mentor of the group, but they didn't lose contact, always advising or helping the band. He had not settled down with the success, and decided, according to God's direction to take on new projects.

In the Belo Horizonte, the singer started working at the "Youth for Christ" movement (Mocidade para Cristo). He also started to present a radio program called "Ponto de encontro", also recording an album with the same name, singing the songs "Casinha" and "Paz pra Cidade", the latter together with Rebanhão. In May of that year, Janires went to Goiânia to see the soccer player Baltazar again, one of his friends. At that time he also met Carlinhos Veiga.

Together with several musicians, he began singing, preaching, and leading worship at Mocidade para Cristo before a crowd of young people, and on Mondays at the well-known Clubão. After returning from a season in the United States, the musician was excited to do a new job. After an unusual event in a restaurant located in the Bus Station of Belo Horizonte, he chose the name of the new band he was forming: Banda Azul.

In July 1987, he and Banda Azul produced what would be Janires' last album, Espelho nos Olhos. The work was recorded in a studio in Rio de Janeiro. However, with his death early the following year the work would be released after his death in May 1988.

== Death ==
On January 11, 1988, leaving Rio de Janeiro, Janires took a bus in the direction of Belo Horizonte. As the bus was passing through the city of Três Rios in the early hours of the same day, around 3:30 a.m. BRT, it got involved in a fatal accident, with Janires dying on the spot. He was supposed to arrive in town that day to attend in the "Clubão", where an audience of one thousand young people was waiting for him, but he didn't show up. Friends from Mocidade para Cristo in Petrópolis recognized the body, and soon the institution's office in Belo Horizonte was notified of the fatality.

Two days later, Janires was mourned in Brasília, and at three o'clock in the afternoon a service was held at the Nova Vida Church. Then he was taken to the Campo da Esperança Cemetery, where he was buried. The funeral was attended by friends and people close to him, like the members of the Banda Azul, Carlinhos Félix, Carlinhos Veiga, the musician's mother, and the teacher Gaudino from Desafio Jovem.

== Personal life ==
Friends of Janires tell that he, although one of the most successful and famous in the Christian community at the time, did not have many possessions. He lived from music, and if he got a lot of money but saw someone who needed it more than he did, he gave it to those who needed it most.

According to Paulo Marotta, the singer was not worried about starting a family, having material possessions or a good job. He always tried to preach what he believed in to people. One of such moments was inside a bus, when a policeman was searching people and the musician took advantage of the moment when the authority was checking his belongings and told people in the vehicle about Jesus. Pretending to be crazy, shouting and running in Copacabana saying "Jesus, Jesus!" helped to scare away criminals who were bothering two women in the neighborhood.

Years before his death, his biological father reappeared, and Janires was invited to meet him. However, he refused, saying that at that time his family were those who lived around him and admired his ministry.

When all his possessions were gathered together, Paulo Marotta says that they were barely enough to fill two bags. His main belongings were his guitar, clothes and his old Bible. The musician had a peculiar way of dressing and expressing himself in society, and was an influence on young people.

== Musical style and influences ==
Janires' music has often fused rock with Brazilian rhythms, such as baião, MPB and choro. Among musicians from Brazil, Zé Rodrix, Taiguara, Ivan Lins, 14 Bis, Raimundo Fagner, Gonzaguinha, and Os Mutantes were some of his influences, among bands and artists from abroad, such as Pink Floyd, The Beatles, Genesis, and others.

The lyrics and sonorities contained in their songs emerged at a time when hymns were sung in most churches using piano and organ. The guitar had just been accepted in congregations, but the guitar, drums, bass, and synthesizers were frowned upon by church authorities. The musician dealt in his lyrics with human daily life and made a contrast with life in Jesus Christ.

He ironized corrupt politicians, TV commercials, parodied movies and soap operas, talked about realities, dreams, failures and frustrations, sin and the resulting misery, to present, in stark contrast, the dazzling light, stupendous grace, and infinite peace of Jesus Christ.

In his best known composition, "Baião", Janires makes an analysis of the social situation of the planet: "Without Jesus Christ it's impossible to live in this big world, it seems people are living in the backlands, it's knife and knife, bullet and bullet, machine guns and cannons, it seems colleges are only training Lampiões... and money is shorter than a snake's leg..."

== Legacy ==
Janires is often pointed out as one of those responsible for the modernization of Christian music. His compositions and his peculiar way of Christian life served as an influence for many musicians. Rebanhão and Banda Azul, his creations, are considered to be the precursors of the so-called gospel movement, which gained strength in the 1990s.

Several contemporary musicians, besides those of his time declared to be influenced, listened to or re-recorded songs of his authorship recorded by Rebanhão and Banda Azul, such as Luiz Arcanjo, Carlinhos Felix, Marcos Almeida, Alex Gonzaga, Paulo César Baruk, Bruno Branco and Marcus Salles.

In 2003, a group of Protestant musicians got together at the Som do Céu Camp, in Belo Horizonte, and interpreted some of the singer's compositions. The production was from the movement Youth for Christ and the songs were performed by Banda Azul, Baixo e Voz, Verso Livre, Cia de Jesus, Expresso Luz, Nelson Bomilcar, Jorge Camargo, Paulinho Marotta, MPC Band, and Carlinhos Veiga. The live recording was entitled Tributo a Janires.

== Discography ==
In his lifetime, Janires recorded several works, with the first being an unreleased 1979 cassette tape. The repertoire of the work was distributed in the first work of Rebanhão, Mais Doce que o Mel. Luz do Mundo was the second record, released in 1983, and two years later his first live album and the only one in his career, Janires e Amigos, was released. After that, Janires recorded Espelho nos Olhos with the Banda Azul in 1987. However, by the time it hit the stores Janires was already dead.

- 1979: Rebanhão
- 1981: Mais Doce que o Mel
- 1983: Luz do Mundo
- 1985: Janires e Amigos
- 1988: Espelho nos Olhos

== Bibliography ==
- Pinheiro, Márcia Leitão (2006). "Na 'pista' da fé: música, festa e outros encontros culturais entre os evangélicos no Rio de Janeiro". Instituto de Filosofia e Ciências Sociais (in Brazilian Portuguese). Rio de Janeiro.
