= Amazonas Motos Especiais =

Brazilian manufacturer of motorcycles

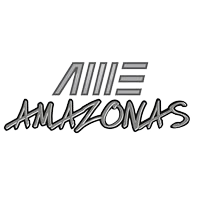
- Company type: privately held company
- Industry: automotive
- Founded: 1978; 48 years ago re-launched-2006
- Founder: Luiz Antônio Gomide; José Carlos Biston
- Defunct: 2009; 17 years ago
- Headquarters: Manaus, Brazil
- Key people: Guilherme Hannud Filho

Amazonas Motos Especiais, commonly shortened to Amazonas or AME, was a Brazilian manufacturer of motorcycles and automobiles.

== History ==
In 1978, production of motorcycles began in plants in São Paulo and Manaus. The vehicles were also exported to the United States and to Europe and Japan. In 1986 there was a change of ownership. From 1987, automobiles and kit cars were also produced. Production ended in 1988. In total, about 700 motorcycles and a few cars were produced.

== Production ==
The range included large motorcycles similar to those from Harley-Davidson. An air-cooled four-cylinder boxer engine from VW do Brasil with 1600 cc displacement powered the vehicles. A sidecar was available from 1982.

In March 1987, the Porsche 550 replica was presented at a São Paulo International Motor Show. A tubular frame formed the basis. An open body made of fiberglass was mounted on it. The VW engine with either 1600 cm^{3}, 1800 cm^{3} or 2160 cm^{3} displacement was placed behind the seats in mid-engine design. Production of 10 to 16 vehicles per month was planned. Already in the same year, the production of this model ended when Porsche decided to give the license to Chamonix NG Cars.

== Relaunch ==
In 2006, the company resumed activities with new models and with the collaboration of the Loncin Corporation, with its headquarters in the Manaus.

== Fate ==
No motorcycle has left the assembly line since 2009, after the partnership with the Chinese brand ended, the company went bankrupt.

== Past models ==
- Cruisers
  - Amazonas 1600 (1978–1988)
  - Amazonas 250 (2006–2009)
- Scooters
  - Amazonas 110 (2006–2009)
  - Amazonas 125 (2006–2009)
  - Amazonas 150 (2008–2009)
