= 1973 in Brazilian television =

This is a list of Brazilian television related events from 1973.

== Events ==
- October 6 - TV Sergipe becomes a TV Globo affiliate.

== Television shows ==
=== 1970s ===
- Vila Sésamo (1972-1977, 2007–present)

== Networks and services ==
=== Launches ===
Network	Type	Launch date	Notes	Source

=== Conversions and rebrandings ===
Old network name	New network name	Type	Conversion Date	Notes	Source

=== Closures ===
Network	Type	Closure date	Notes	Source

== Births ==
- 6 August - Vanessa Gerbelli, actress
- 26 September - Leandro Hassum, actor, comedian, writer & producer
- 20 October - Rodrigo Faro, TV host, actor & singer
- 22 November - Eliana Michaelichen Bezerra, TV host, actress & singer
- 30 November - Angélica Ksyvickis, TV host, actress, singer & businesswoman

== See also ==
- 1973 in Brazil
