= Sud Mennucci =

Brazilian journalist and educator

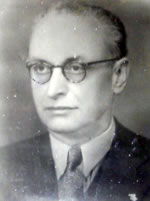
- Dr. Sud Mennucci
- Born: January 20, 1892; Piracicaba, São Paulo, Brazil
- Died: July 22, 1948 (aged 56); São Paulo, Brazil
- Occupations: Journalist, Educator
- Known for: Promoting quality in public education
- Title: Director of the Regional Office of Campinas, General Director of the State Secretary of Education of São Paulo
- Awards: Award by the Academia Brasileira de Educação for A Crise Brasileira da Educação

Sud Menucci (January 20, 1892 — July 22, 1948) was a Brazilian journalist and educator, who was a strong proponent of quality in public education in his country. He was the regional education delegate of Campinas, and later moved to the central office of the State School Census, working with reformer Sampaio Dória. He was the author of numerous works on education, culture, literary criticism, and nationalism.

The municipality of Sud Mennucci, São Paulo has been named in his honor.

== Early life and education ==
The son of Italian immigrants, Mennucci was born in Piracicaba, state of São Paulo. In 1908, he completed a degree as a primary school teacher.

== Career ==
In 1910 he started his career as a teacher in a rural school. In 1913 he moved to Belém, in the state of Pará, invited to reorganize the Escolas de Aprendizes de Marinheiros de Belém do Pará until 1914.

Back to São Paulo, he continued to work as a teacher in the cities of Porto Ferreira and São Paulo City.

In 1920, he was the coordinator of the school census of the state, which led the reorganization of the state secretary of education into 15 regional offices. Briefly after that, he was appointed as the director of the regional office of Campinas.

Mennucci's career as a journalist started in 1925. Until 1931, he worked as an editor and literary critic at the O Estado de S. Paulo newspaper. In that year, he was promoted to the general directorship of the state secretary of education of the state of São Paulo. He was also very active, beginning 1930, in the creation of the Centro do Professorado Paulista, one of the main teacher's associations in the state. He was its president between 1931 and 1948.

He was the author of A Crise Brasileira da Educação (The Brazilian Educational Crisis), which received an award by the Academia Brasileira de Educação (Brazilian Academy of Education). He died in São Paulo, aged 56.
