= A Estrela de Absinto =

1927 novel by Oswald de Andrade

- Author: Oswald de Andrade
- Language: Portuguese
- Genre: Novel
- Publication date: 1927
- Publication place: Brazil
- Media type: Print

A Estrela de Absinto is a Portuguese-language novel by Brazilian author Oswald de Andrade.
