= Jaqueline Jesus =

Brazilian psychologist, writer, and activist (born 1978)

Jaqueline Gomes de Jesus
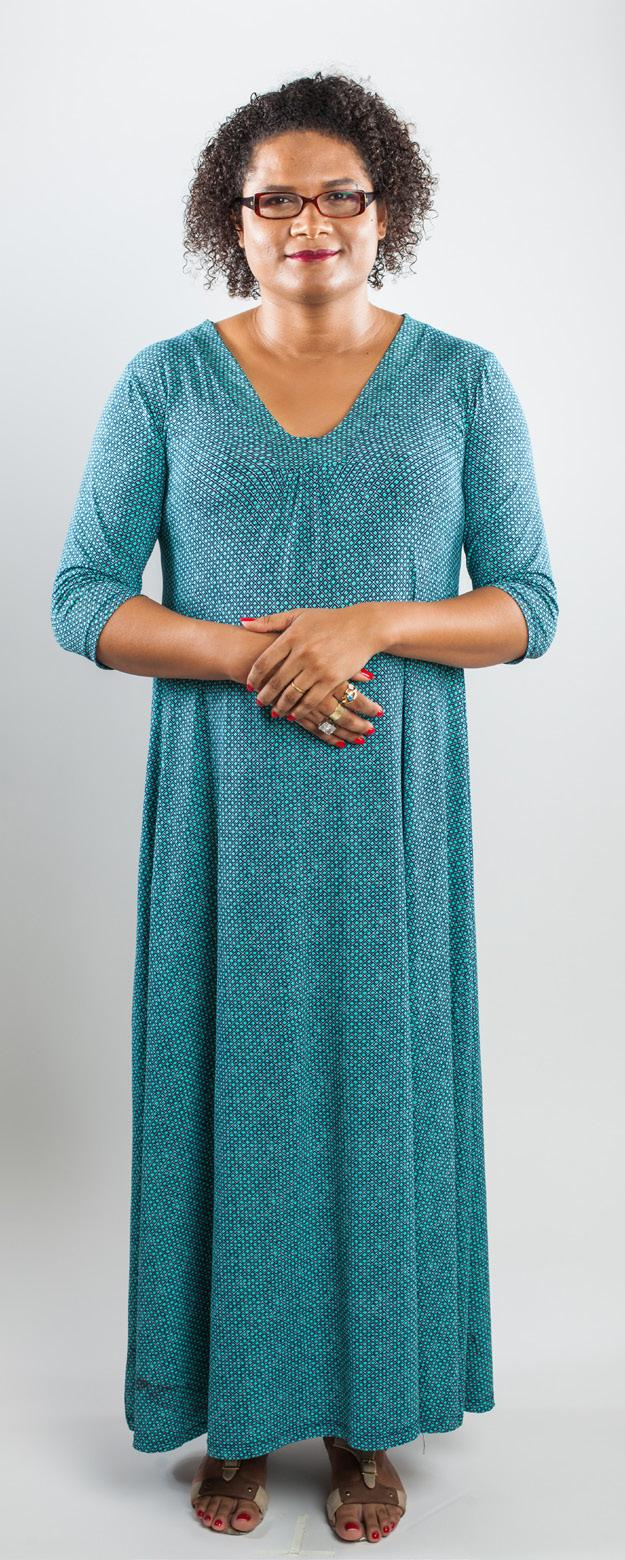
- Born: March 7, 1978 (age 48); Brasília, DF, Brazil
- Education: MSc in Psychology; PhD in Social Psychology, Work and Organisations
- Alma mater: University of Brasília
- Scientific career
- Fields: Psychology
- Institutions: University of Brasília

Jaqueline Gomes de Jesus (born March 7, 1978) is a Brazilian psychologist, writer, and LGBT activist.

== Biography ==
Jesus is the daughter of a computer operator and a mining science teacher. She has a sibling, a younger brother. Jesus lived most of her life in Ceilândia. A good student, she studied chemistry, for a year before switching majors. She holds an M.Sc. in psychology from the University of Brasília, and a PhD in Social Psychology, Work and Organisations from the same institution. She worked at the University of Brasília from 2003 to 2008 as a diversity adviser and also coordinated a center for black students. She was one of the organizers of Brasilia's Pride parade, and participated in the development of Brazil's goals for the UN's Millennium Dome. Jesus has proactively addressed discriminatory actions, refusing to accept passive prejudice. She began her human rights activism in 1997, with "Estructuración", a Brasilia homosexual group, serving first as secretary and in 1999, became president. In that period, she worked alongside government and educational institutions, in fighting prejudice and valuing differences, speaking at the opening of the 5th National Conference on Human Rights. Jesus participated in various social movements. In 2000, with Luiz Mott, she co-founded the Academic Association of Gays, Lesbians and Sympathizers of Brazil, serving as general secretary. She was appointed to the editorial board of the Grupo Gay Negro de Bahia; and founded the NGO Acciones Ciudades en Orientación sexual.

== Key publications ==
- Homofobia : identificar e prevenir, 2015 (tr. "homophobia: identifying and preventing")
- Ainda que tardia : escravidão e liberdade no Brasil contemporâneo, 2016 (tr. "Although late: slavery and freedom in contemporary Brazil")
