= Meu Testamento =

1944 novel by Oswald de Andrade

- Author: Oswald de Andrade
- Language: Portuguese
- Publication date: 1944
- Publication place: Brazil

Meu Testamento is a Portuguese-language novel by Brazilian author, Oswald de Andrade. It was first published in 1944.
