= TV Universitária (Recife) =

TV Universitária (ZYQ 102)
Recife, Pernambuco; Brazil
- Channels: Digital: 40 (UHF); Virtual: 11
- Branding: TV Universitária

Programming
- Affiliations: TV Brasil

Ownership
- Owner: Núcleo de Rádio e TV Universitárias; (Federal University of Pernambuco)
- Sister stations: Rádio Paulo Freire; Universitária FM

History
- Founded: November 22, 1968
- First air date: November 22, 1968
- Former call signs: ZYB 54; ZYB 306
- Former channel numbers: Analog: 11 (VHF, 1968–2017)
- Former affiliations: Educational independent (1968-1978); TVE Brasil (1978-1997; 2007); TV Cultura (1997-2009)

Technical information
- Licensing authority: ANATEL
- ERP: 6 kW
- Transmitter coordinates: 8°2′57.9″S 34°52′29.8″W

Links
- Public license information: Profile
- Website: www.ufpe.br/ntvru

TV Universitária is a Brazilian television station based in Recife, capital of the state of Pernambuco. It operates on channel 11 (UHF digital 40) and is affiliated to TV Brasil. It belongs to the University Radio and TV Center of the Federal University of Pernambuco, which also includes radio stations Paulo Freire and Universitária FM. It was opened in 1968, being the first educational TV station created in the country.

== History ==
The idea for an educational station in Recife stemmed from Caetano Queiroz de Andrade in 1963. Professor of Engineering and Geometric Design of the course of Architecture at UFPE, he discovered a passion for video to teach Arts and Crafts in the “Como Ensinar Desenho pela Televisão” thesis, by professor Fernanda Ferrancini. This occurred in October 1963, during the 1st Brazilian Congress of Drawing Teachers.

The initiative to request the granting of an educational channel was taken to the University Council in 1964 and divided opinions in the academic community.

On January 11, 1966, the National Telecommunications Council (CONTEL) reserved five frequencies for non-commercial educational television stations: channel 5 in Londrina, channel 11 in Recife, channel 6 in Alegrete, channel 3 in Bagé and channel 5 in Bauru. CONTEL granted the license to channel 11, what would become TVU, on February 4, 1966, with the contract being signed on February 28 the same year. On February 28, 1967, CONTEL defined rules for educational television stations for state capitals and cities with a population of over 100,000. 128 licenses were reserved – 75 UHF licenses and 53 VHF licenses. The first test broadcasts were held on July 28, 1968.

TV Universitária was created on November 22, 1968, as a part of the Núcleo de TV e Rádios Universitárias - a supplementary body of UFPE - with the purpose of expanding the horizons of information, culture and education. At the time, TV was the fastest growing means of communication, according to UNESCO, and Brazil was among the ten countries with the highest number of television sets. At the time, it was in ninth place in a total of 110 countries, with 4.5 million television sets and 500,000 new television sets manufactured per year. The Northeast region had 200,000 residential television sets and, despite being part of one of the poorest regions in the country, these statistics were used as justification for the implementation of the channel in Pernambuco, according to the report "Televisão Universitária - Canal 11", on the implementation of the station. It was located at a terrain on Avenida Norte.

According to the document, illiteracy reached 50% of the population and was the same rate as school-age inhabitants. To educate and train this part of society that was far from education centers, TVU was created as it had a greater reach.

The broadcaster began its production with more than 20 programs. Under the general direction of Professor Manoel Caetano, the production department had a team of 12 people. The sector produced 11 programs, including Sala de Visitas, The Grand Jury, No Mundo das Artes and Isto é Universidade. In the 2000s, TV Universitária was part of the Public Television Network (RPTV), which reached 98 million viewers throughout Brazil. In 2008, the station started showing TV Brasil programming, but without stopping showing TV Cultura.

In 2009, it left RPTV and TV Cultura and became entirely affiliated to TV Brasil.

== Technical information ==
Virtual channel	Digital channel	Aspect ratio	Content
11.1	40 UHF	1080i	TV Universitária/TV Brasil's main schedule

The station began its digital transmissions on April 13, 2017, through channel 40 UHF .

Based on the federal decree transitioning Brazilian TV stations from analogue to digital signals, TV Universitária, as well as the other stations in Recife, ceased broadcasting on VHF channel 11 on July 26, 2017, following the official ANATEL timeline. Unlike other stations, the station only ended its broadcasts hours later, in the early hours of July 27.
