= Amazonas AME-250 C1 =

AME-250 C1
- Manufacturer: Amazonas Motos Especiais
- Production: 2006–2009
- Class: Cruiser
- Engine: 249 cc (15.2 cu in) air-cooled OHC 4-valve V4
- Power: 21.5 hp (16.0 kW) @ 6,700 RPM
- Torque: 25.2 N⋅m (18.6 lb⋅ft) @ 5,400 RPM
- Transmission: 5-speed, belt drive
- Suspension: Front: telescopic forks Rear: dual shock
- Brakes: Front: Twin disc 2 piston Rear: Single disc
- Tires: Front: 110/90-16; Rear: 130/90-15
- Wheelbase: 1,500 mm (59 in)
- Dimensions: L: 2,200 mm (87 in); W: 830 mm (33 in); H: 1,200 mm (47 in)
- Seat height: 740 mm (29 in)
- Weight: 185 kg (408 lb) (dry); 335 kg (739 lb) (wet)
- Fuel capacity: 18 L (4.8 US gal)
- Oil capacity: 1.5 L (1.6 US qt)

The Amazonas AME-250 C1 was a motorcycle made by the Brazilian manufacturer Amazonas, manufactured in Manaus from 2006 to 2009. The engine looks similar to the one found in the BMW R1200C by general design, nevertheless sizes of practically all elements differ and the parts are not interchangeable.
