= José Fragelli =

Brazilian politician (1915–2010)

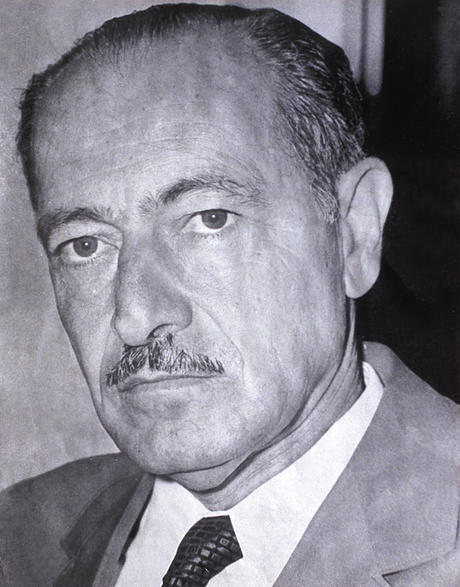

Personal details
- Born: 31 December 1915 Corumbá, Brazil
- Died: 30 April 2010 (aged 94) Aquidauana, Brazil

José Manuel Fontanillas Fragelli (31 December 1915 – 30 April 2010) was a Brazilian politician, lawyer and academic. Fragelli served as the governor of Mato Grosso from 1970 until 1974 and the President of the Senate of Brazil from 1985 through 1987.

Fragelli was born in the city of Corumbá, Brazil. (Corumbá was located in the state of Mato Grosso at the time. In 1977, the new state of Mato Grosso do Sul, which includes Corumbá, was carved from Mato Grosso). He earned his law degree from the Faculty of Law at Largo São Francisco (Faculdade de Direito da Universidade de São Paulo).

Fragelli began his career as a district attorney and law professor. He served as a Mato Grosso state legislator from 1947 until 1959 before being elected as a deputy to the Chamber of Deputies of Brazil, the lower house of the National Congress, where he served from 1950 until 1959. He was a leader of the now defunct National Democratic Union.

He served as the governor of Mato Grosso from 1970 until 1974. Returning to Congress, this time as a Senator, Fragelli was elected President of the Senate of Brazil from 1985 until 1987. he briefly served as the acting President of Brazil for nine days during the administration of President José Sarney.

José Fragelli died on 30 April 2010, at the age of 95. He was buried in the municipal cemetery in the city of Aquidauana, Mato Grosso do Sul.

The Estádio Governador José Fragelli, located in Cuiabá, Mato Grosso, is named for Fragelli.
