= List of Brazilian painters =

This is a list of notable Brazilian painters.

== A–E ==
- Abigail de Andrade
- Francisco Pedro do Amaral
- Tarsila do Amaral
- Pedro Américo
- Rodolfo Amoedo
- Constantine Andreou
- Félix Bernardelli
- Romero Britto
- João Câmara
- Iberê Camargo
- Marcela Cantuária
- Lygia Clark
- Edgard Cognat
- Fernando Da Silva
- Emiliano Di Cavalcanti
- Djanira da Motta e Silva
- Augustus Earle

== F–M ==
- Clóvis Graciano
- Eli Heil
- Arcangelo Ianelli
- Fábio Innecco
- Almeida Júnior
- Aldo Locatelli
- Juarez Machado
- Solange Magalhaes
- Anita Malfatti
- Denis Mandarino
- Ferreira Louis Marius
- Aldemir Martins
- Manuel Martins
- Victor Meirelles
- Sérgio Milliet
- Sergio Rossetti Morosini
- Ismael Nery
- Fulvio Pennacchi
- Georgina de Albuquerque
- Grupo Santa Helena (collective)
- Hélio Oiticica
- Hipólito Boaventura Caron
- Humberto Rosa
- José Pancetti
- Karl Ernst Papf
- Lasar Segall
- Lucas Pennacchi
- Manuel de Araújo Porto-Alegre
- Manuel Dias de Oliveira
- Mario Zanini

== N–P ==
- Naza
- Constancia Nery
- Nicson
- Antônio Parreiras
- Regina Parra
- Antonio Peticov
- Wanda Pimentel
- Antônio Rafael Pinto Bandeira
- Candido Portinari

== R–Z ==
- Francisco Rebolo
- Vicente do Rego Monteiro
- Alfredo Rizzotti
- Simplício Rodrigues de Sá
- Isabelle Tuchband
- Rubem Valentim
- Eliseu Visconti
- Alfredo Volpi
- Bertha Worms
- Niobe Xandó
- Emmanuel Zamor

== See also ==
- Brazilian art
- List of Brazilian artists
