= Marcela =

Marcela is a feminine given name which may refer to:

== Actresses ==
- Marcela Barrozo (born 1992), Brazilian actress
- Marcela Carvajal (born 1969), Colombian actress
- Marcela Gallego (born 1971), Colombian actress
- Marcela Guirado (born 1989), Mexican actress
- Marcela Kloosterboer (born 1983), Argentine actress
- Marcela Osorio (born 1964), Chilean actress
- Marcela Walerstein (born 1971), Venezuelan actress

== Musicians ==
- Marcela Bovio (born 1979), Mexican singer, violinist and songwriter
- Marcela Gándara (born 1983), Mexican singer-songwriter of Christian music
- Marcela Lucatelli (born 1988), Brazilian composer, director, vocalist and performance artist
- Marcela Morelo (born 1969), Argentine singer-songwriter
- Marcela Oroši, 21st century Croatian singer
- Marcela Pavia (born 1957), Italian-American composer
- Marcela Rodríguez (born 1951), Mexican composer

== Politicians ==
- Marcela Aguiñaga (born 1973), Ecuadorian politician
- Marcela Amaya (born 1968), Colombian politician, former governor of Meta Department
- Marcela Antola (born 1964), Argentine politician
- Marcela Campagnoli (born 1957), Argentine politician
- Marcela Guerra Castillo (born 1959), Mexican politician
- Marcela Čavojová (born 1973), Slovak politician
- Marcela Costales (1951–2020), Ecuadorian historian and politician
- Marcela Cubillos (born 1967), Chilean lawyer and politician, former Minister of Education and former Minister for the Environment
- Marcela González Salas (1947–2023), Mexican politician
- Marcela Hernando (born 1960), Chilean politician and physician, former Minister of Mining
- Marcela Holguín (born 1973), Ecuadorian politician
- Marcela Lagarde (born 1948), Mexican academic, author, researcher, anthropologist, feminist activist and politician
- Marcela Lombardo Otero (1926–2018), Mexican politician
- Marcela Losardo (born 1958), Argentine lawyer and politician, former Minister of Justice and Human Rights
- Marcela Mitaynes, 21st century American politician
- Marcela Fabiana Passo (born 1976), Argentine politician
- Marcela Ríos (born 1966), Chilean politician and sociologist, former Minister of Justice
- Marcela Sabat (born 1981), Chilean lawyer and politician
- Marcela Vieyra Alamilla (1963–2019), Mexican politician

== Scientists ==
- Marcela Bilek (born 1968), Czech-born Australian physicist
- Marcela Carena (born 1962), Argentine-born American physicist
- Marcela Contreras (born 1942), Chilean-British blood expert and educator
- Marcela Maus, American immunologist and professor of medicine

== Sportspeople ==
- Marcela Acuña (born 1976), Argentine boxer
- Marcela Arounian (born 2000), Brazilian handball player
- Marcela Chibás (born 1951), Cuban sprinter
- Marcela Cuesta (born 1972), Costa Rican former swimmer
- Marcela Daniel (born 1943), Panamanian former sprinter
- Marcela Erbanová (born 1978), Slovak former sprint canoer
- Marcela Hilgertová (born 1962), Czech former slalom canoeist
- Marcela Hussey (born 1967), Argentine former field hockey player
- Marcela Joglová (born 1987), Czech former long-distance runner
- Marcela Krůzová (born 1990), Czech retired footballer
- Marcela Kubalčíková (born 1973), Czech former swimmer
- Marcela Kubatková (born 1971), Czech orienteering competitor
- Marcela Lopez (born 1982), Brazilian aerobic gymnast
- Marcela Marić (born 1996), Croatian Olympic diver
- Marcela Menezes (born 1986), Brazilian group rhythmic gymnast
- Marcela Ortiz (born 1996), Bolivian footballer
- Marcela Pavkovčeková (born 1977), Slovak biathlete
- Marcela Prieto (born 1992), Mexican racing cyclist
- Marcela Restrepo (born 1995), Colombian footballer
- Marcela Richezza (born 1964), Argentine field hockey player
- Marcela Rizzotto (born 1948), Argentine former Paralympic swimmer
- Marcela Robinson (born 1997), Puerto Rican footballer
- Marcela Torres (born 1988), Argentine-born Swedish artistic gymnast
- Marcela Váchová (born 1953), Czech retired artistic gymnast
- Marcela Valera (born 1987), Mexican footballer
- Marcela Zacarías (born 1994), Mexican former tennis player

== Writers and journalists ==
- Marcela Delpastre (1925–1998), French-Occitan author
- Marcela Serrano (born 1951), Chilean novelist
- Marcela Topor (born 1976), Romanian journalist
- Marcela Turati (born 1974), Mexican journalist, author and activist
- Marcela Zamora (born 1980), Salvadoran-Nicaraguan documentary director and journalist

== Other ==
- Marcela Agoncillo (1859–1946), Filipina principal seamstress of the first Philippine flag
- Marcela Cantuária (born 1991), Brazilian visual artist
- Marcela Gracia Ibeas, participant in the first same-sex marriage in Spain (1901)
- Marcela Marcelo (1869–1897), Filipina general in the Philippine Revolution
- Marcela de San Félix (1605–1688), Spanish nun, poet, actress and dramatist
- Marcela Trujillo (born 1969), Chilean visual artist, painter, cartoonist and professor
- Marcela Valladolid (born 1978), American chef, author and television host
- Marcela Hope Yellowbear (2002–2004), American child murdered by her father

== See also ==
- Marcella (disambiguation), the Italian equivalent
- Marcel (given name)
