= Clóvis Graciano =

Brazilian artist (1907–1988)

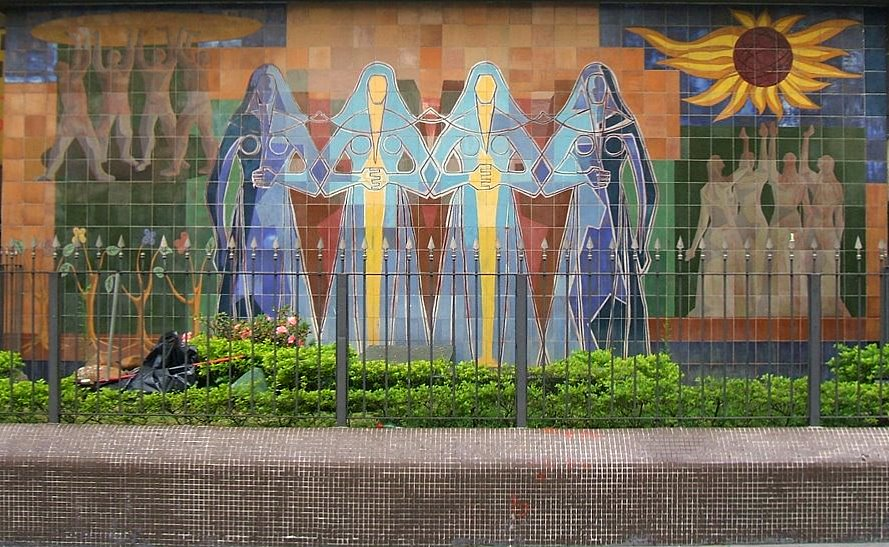

Clóvis Graciano (January 29, 1907 – June 29, 1988) was a Brazilian artist who worked with painting, drawing, scenography, costume design, engraving and illustration.

== Early life ==
Graciano was born in Araras.

== Career ==
In 1927 he was hired by the Estrada de Ferro Sorocabana (or "Sorocabana Railroad", currently América Latina Logística), in Conchas, São Paulo state, where he painted poles, signboards and warnings for the railroad stations.

In 1934 he moved to São Paulo to work as a clerk. From then, he divided his time between art and his job. After ten years, he was fired for excessive absences.

In 1937, having encountered the art of Alfredo Volpi, Clóvis Graciano took his place in the Palacete Santa Helena, becoming part of the Grupo Santa Helena, together with Francisco Rebolo, Mario Zanini, Aldo Bonadei, Fulvio Pennacchi and others, besides Volpi.

Graciano befriended Portinari. In the late 1940s, he went to Paris, where he learned about mural painting. Back to Brazil, he did several panels. For instance, Armistício de Iperoig (or "Iperoig's truce"), for FAAP (1962); the panel Operário (or "Proletarian") in Avenida Moreira Guimarães, in São Paulo city (1979), murals in Avenida Paulista, and in Diário Popular's building.

In 1971, he worked as director of São Paulo State Pinacotheca, and as president of the São Paulo's State Board for Visual Arts, and of the São Paulo's State Council for Culture.

Besides painting, Graciano worked in several different activities in parallel, teaching scenography in EAD (USP's drama school), and illustration newspapers, magazines and books, particularly in the 1980s.

Throughout his career, Graciano was faithful to Figurativism, and never felt a slight attraction to abstract art. He worked extensively with social themes, like the migrants, besides themes with musicians and dancers. He died in São Paulo, aged 81.

His works are held by museums and private collections in Brazil and abroad.

== See also ==
- List of Brazilian painters
