= Francisco Rebolo =

Brazilian painter and footballer (1902-1980)

Francisco Rebolo Gonsales, widely known as Francisco Rebolo or just Rebolo (August 22, 1902 – July 10, 1980), was a Brazilian painter and footballer. He was a son of Spanish immigrants that arrived into Brazil at the end of the 19th century.

== Biography ==
He was born on August 22, 1902 in São Paulo. He lived intensely two different life paths: from 1917 to 1932, he was an association football player. He played for Corinthians from 1921 to 1927, and for Ypiranga after that. Both are based in São Paulo city. From 1934 on, he became a painter.

He was founder of Grupo Santa Helena, together with Fulvio Pennacchi, Aldo Bonadei, Humberto Rosa, Manuel Martins, Clóvis Graciano, Mario Zanini, Alfredo Volpi and Alfredo Rizzotti.

Rebolo is considered as one of the most important landscape painters of Brazilian art. His work is estimated in more than 3.000 paintings, hundreds of drawings, and a set of fifty engraving images. Besides landscapes, he also had an important work with portraits and still life paintings, particularly of flowers. Nowadays, Rebolo works figure in the main Brazilian museums, in the collection catalog of cultural and governmental organizations, as well as in privately held collections all over Brazil.

Rebolo was also the creator of the coat of arms of the Sport Club Corinthians Paulista, drawn in the 1930s.

He died on July 10, 1980 in São Paulo.

== See also ==
- List of Brazilian painters
