= Pennacchi =

Pennacchi is a surname. Notable people with the surname include:

- Andrea Pennacchi (born 1969), Italian actor
- Antonio Pennacchi (1950–2021), Italian writer
- Fulvio Pennacchi (1905–1992), Italian-Brazilian artist
- George Pennacchi, American economist
- Lucas Pennacchi (born 1960), Brazilian artist
- Pier Maria Pennacchi (1464—before 1515), Italian Renaissance painter

See also:

- Pennacchio (surname)
