= Grupo Santa Helena =

Brazilian painters

Grupo Santa Helena, or Santa Helena Group, was the name given by the critic Sérgio Milliet to the painters that met in the ateliers of Francisco Rebolo and Mario Zanini starting in the 1930s. The ateliers belonged to a Praça da Sé building named Palacete Santa Helena. This building was demolished in 1971, when the Sé station of São Paulo Metro was built.

The Santa Helena Group was formed spontaneously, without any conceptual commitment. Most of its members were Italian immigrants, like Alfredo Volpi and Fulvio Pennacchi; sons of Italian immigrants, like Aldo Bonadei, Alfredo Rizzotti, Mario Zanini and Humberto Rosa; some were Spanish immigrants like Francisco Rebolo; some Portuguese immigrants like Manuel Martins.

They all shared a humble origin, and worked as artisans or proletarians. Rebolo, Volpi and Zanini were wall painters. Clóvis Graciano was a railroad worker. Fulvio Pennacchi was a butcher. Aldo Bonadei worked with costume design and embroidery. Rizzotti was an auto mechanic and a lathe worker. Manoel Martins was a goldsmith. Rebolo was a football player. Humberto Rosa and Pennacchi taught drawing. Painting was for the weekends or leisure time.

Most of them had courses in the Liceu de Artes e Ofícios (or "Arts and Crafts Lyceum", that was one Liceo scientifico), or the Escola Profissional Masculina do Brás (or "Men's Professional School of Brás"). However, they reduced what they learned to drawing and painting techniques, not to the academic guiding of formal order, were they aware of that or not.

By this time, some painters associations were created in São Paulo, like the Sociedade Pró-Arte Moderna (or "Pro-Modern Art Society", a.k.a. SPAM) or Clube dos Artistas Modernos (CAM, or "Modern Artists Club"). They joined the participants of the Semana de Arte Moderna (or "Modern Art Week"). These groups were formed by intellectuals and members of the São Paulo elite, which kept a great distance from the Santa Helena members and other proletarian groups, about which they had little or no knowledge.

The group union, that lasted for years, can be explained as a reaction against the enormous prejudice that existed about the poor immigrants, that came not only from the pre-existent Brazilian elite families, but also from immigrants that became wealthy in Brazil. That prejudice was made clear in several criticisms that were directed to the Group's work, particularly when it started to cause a sensation, and to threaten positions already established.

Some Santa Helena artists had already studied art in Europe before arriving in Brazil; for instance Pennacchi, Rizzotti and Bonadei. All others had difficulty learning about the art created there, and could only be taught by teachers in Brazil. Bonadei was a student of Pedro Alexandrino, Antonio Rocco and Amadeo Scavone. Graciano was taught by Waldemar da Costa, and Zanini was a Georg Elpons student.

The perseverance of the group, in its fight for survival, caused interest and attracted new friends and partners. So, in due time, the place became the meeting point of many other artists.

The Santa Helena Group's major achievement was to reveal some of the most important Brazilian visual artists of the 20th century.

== Exhibitions ==
In 1937, an exhibition named Família Artística Paulista, or "Artistic Family of São Paulo" shown a set of artists, including the Grupo Santa Helena, that could show their work publicly for the first time. From then on, the Grupo became known. They provoked the interest of Mário de Andrade, that identified in them a "São Paulo school of painting".

In 1940, the "Exhibition of French Painters", that presented Cézanne, Picasso, Braque and Gris, among others, caused an enormous impact and several components of the group started to redirect his work, what made them more distant of the Grupo's themes or in their formal aspects.

== See also ==
- List of Brazilian painters
