= Locatelli =

Locatelli is an Italian surname of Lombard origin. It constitutes the Italian form of the Bergamasque family name Locadell or de Locadell (Milanese spelling).

== Geographical distribution ==
As of 2014, 66.7% of all known bearers of the surname Locatelli were residents of Italy (frequency 1:1,705), 15.9% of Brazil (1:24,007), 9.5% of France (1:13,015), 2.7% of Argentina (1:29,519), 1.8% of the United States (1:372,424) and 1.5% of Switzerland (1:10,189).

In Italy, the frequency of the surname was higher than national average (1:1,705) only in one region: Lombardy (1:296)

== People ==
- Achille Locatelli (1856–1935), Italian cardinal
- Achille Locatelli (painter) (1864–1948), Italian painter and writer of art biographies
- Aldo Locatelli (1915–1962), Italian painter
- Alessio Locatelli (born 1978), Italian football goalkeeper
- Andrea Locatelli (1695–1741), Italian painter
- Andrea Locatelli (motorcyclist) (born 1996), Italian motorcycle racer
- Antonio Locatelli (1895–1936), Italian aviator and journalist
- Elio Locatelli (1943–2019), Italian speed skater
- Eustachio Locatelli (died 1575), Roman Catholic prelate, Bishop of Reggio Emilia
- Francesco Locatelli (1920–1978), Italian racing cyclist
- Gabriele Moreno Locatelli (1959–1993), Italian pacifist
- Giorgio Locatelli (born 1963), Italian chef working in the UK
- Giovan Francesco Locatelli (1810–1882), Italian painter
- Giovanni Battista Locatelli (disambiguation), several people
- John Baptist Locatelli (1735-1805) Italian sculptor
- Manuel Locatelli (born 1998), Italian footballer
- Maria Cattarina Locatelli (or Lucatelli; died 1723), Italian painter
- Paul Locatelli (1938–2010), American Jesuit and president of Santa Clara University
- Pietro Locatelli (1695–1764), Italian Baroque composer and violinist
- Roberto Locatelli (born 1974), Italian motorcycle racer
- Rolando Locatelli (born 1949), Argentine Olympic rowing cox
- Tomas Locatelli (born 1976), Italian international footballer
- Ugo Locatelli (1916–1993), Italian footballer

== See also ==
- Locanda Locatelli, Giorgio Locatelli's Michelin-starred restaurant in London
- Locatelli is the trademark of a popular brand of pecorino romano cheese (which is owned in the United States by the Italian company Auricchio SpA)
- Locatelli is one of the brands of the group Lactalis under which mostly fresh cheeses are produced.
- Lucatelli
