= Antonio Peticov =

Brazilian painter, designer, sculptor, and engraver

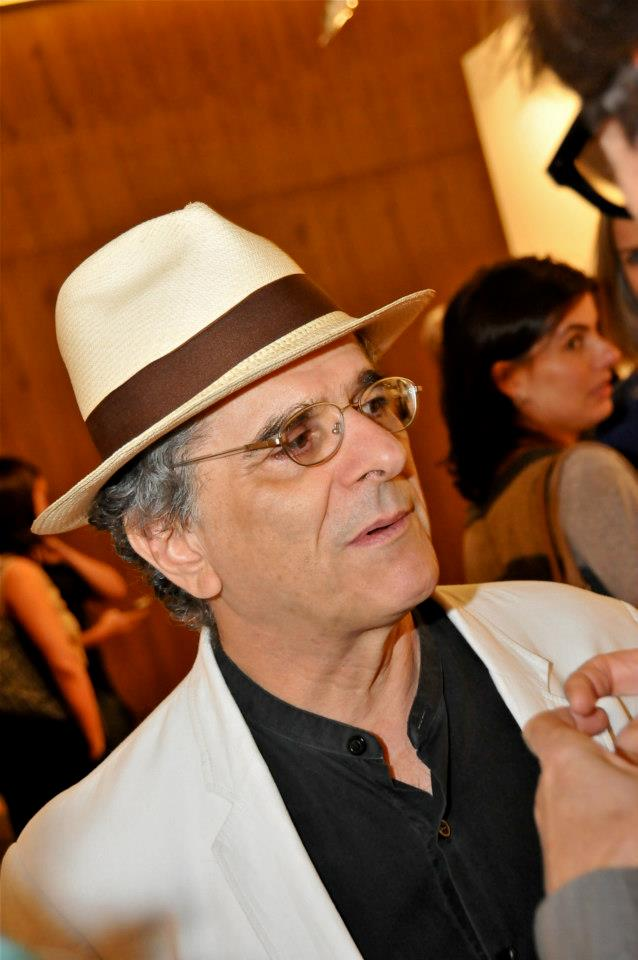
- Antonio Peticov in 2015
- Born: 2 July 1946 (age 80); Assis, São Paulo, Brazil
- Known for: Painting; Sculpture
- Website: http://www.peticolors.com

Antonio Peticov (born July 2, 1946) is a Brazilian painter, designer, sculptor, and engraver.

Self-taught, Peticov's approach is based on systematic personal research in the history of art and its integration into avant-garde artistic movements in the second half of the 1960s. He also specialized in sacred geometry and the golden ratio, giving his work a strong mathematical character.

In 1967, together with artists Aldir Mendes de Souza and Gilberto Salvador, he founded the group Vanguarda Jovem no Arena, participating in several exhibitions. During the same period, he began his involvement with the Tropicália movement.

He was president of the cooperative of Visual Artists of Brazil between 2003 and 2007, and is a member of the Lewis Carroll Society of North America. He founded and directed the Núcleo de Arte Contemporânea (NAC) in São Paulo, between 1999 and 2006. In 2016, at the age of 70, he opened the Antonio Peticov Institute of Art and Culture.

== Biography ==
=== Childhood and youth ===
A Brazilian of Bulgarian descent, Peticov's grandparents immigrated to Brazil with tickets paid for by the Brazilian government, who, after abolishing slavery, needed to replace the labor force. Peticov was born in the city of Assis, São Paulo, close to the border of Paraná. In 1960, while his family was living in Rio de Janeiro, Peticov became interested in pursuing art after meeting Mauro Salles Júnior, the art director of the Batista publishing house.

=== Adult life ===
In the late 1960s, influenced by the Beat Generation, Peticov saw himself as a hippie. In 1969, he went to the Midem Festival in Cannes with the band Os Mutantes, whom he helped found while managing the Six Sided Rockers. Peticov visited London where he was an assistant to his friend, artist Hélio Oiticica, in the assembly of his exhibition at the Whitechapel Gallery.

In 1970, at the age of 23, he was arrested for the dissemination of lysergic acid (LSD) in Brazil. Among those working on the case was investigator and torturer Angelino "Russinho" Moliterno, who was part of Brazil's so-called "death squads". According to Vice, despite being tortured and taken to Carandiru Penitentiary, Peticov was subsequently cleared in what was the first judicial process of this matter in Brazil. During the 70 days he was at Carandiru, he continued to draw and paint, becoming friendly with a fellow prisoner, Giuseppe Baccaro, an Italian intellectual and art merchant, who was arrested for possession of a joint.

He was interviewed by Antônio Abujamra in 2016 on the TV Cultura interview program Provocações and stated: "In my hand there appeared a large amount of lysergic acid, which was perhaps the most important invention of the 20th century, because it was the opportunity to have in my hand, in my pocket, or in my wallet the ticket for the most important trip that a person can have in his life, the trip to his interior. I felt obliged to disclose that."

The severity of the prison experience and the strong repression of Brazil's military dictatorship, together with his new marriage to his first wife Maria Luiza, motivated Peticov to leave for exile in London, at the age of 24. In 1985 he moved again, this time to New York City, where he lived until 1999. While in New York, he designed the poster for the Javits Center inauguration, and created several of his best known works. He later married Elizabeth dos Santos Peixoto, with whom he had son, Pedro Antonio, born in Brazil in 1990. He traveled back and forth between the United States and Brazil, returning to Brazil permanently in 2000 and settling in Brooklin.

In 2017, Peticov began his autobiography. In 2020, he participated in a Fundação Nacional de Artes (Funarte) festival, presenting "6 releituras de Antonio Peticov - Uma exposição guiada pelo artista", directed by his son Pedro Antonio. Due to the COVID-19 pandemic, he is active on livestreams about varied themes: usually art, mathematics, music, sacred geometry and curiosities.

== Installations and productions ==
Peticov has a diversified production that follows varied tendencies of the international artistic avant-garde of the last decades. He has created environmental installations and murals in Italy, Switzerland, the United States, and Brazil. He has also produced audiovisual productions, among them:

- In 1982, the Bali Ballet in Cloudwalk Farm, Connecticut.
- In 1983, the installation The Big Ladder in front of the Coliseum in New York.
- In 1986, the installation Sete Anéis in Rio de Janeiro.
- In 1988, the sculpture The Golden Wæll (in the form of a large spiral, in honor of the town of Aiuruoca, Minas Gerais).
- In 1989, presented Projeto Natura - Rio Pinheiros at the 20th São Paulo International Biennial.
- In 1990, the mural Momento Antropofágico com Oswald de Andrade in the São Paulo Metro's Republica station (Line 3 - Vermelha).
- In 1992, the Projeto Bosque Natura in Rio de Janeiro.
- In 1995, the installation Torre Transburti and three other murals in Santo Amaro station (Line 5 - Lilás).
- In 2020, the mini documentary "6 releituras de Antonio Peticov - Uma exposição guiada pelo artista" in collaboration with Funarte.

== Golden ratio and mathematics ==
Having moved to Milan in 1972, Peticov bought a copy of Aldo Montù's 1970 book Φ = 1.61803398875... Appunti ed annotazioni su Natura e Geometria - Progressione Aurea e forme pentagonali. Full of detailed illustrations and graphs, this book had a great influence on his work. He was also introduced to the Fibonacci Sequence, with whole numbers mirroring the irrational numbers derived from Φ.

In addition, the influence of Martin Gardner, through Peticov's participation in the biennial Gathering 4 Gardner conventions, further deepened the relationship of his work to numbers and geometry in general.

In this vein, Peticov has worked with aperiodic tiles; his 1990 project Momento Antropofágico com Oswald de Andrade – a work full of mathematical references – was installed in São Paulo's República metro station. A scholar of puzzles, he has a collection of mathematical objects, puzzles, aperiodic tiles (which he also designs), and paradoxical objects in the largest collection of its kind in Brazil.

== Posters, book, and album covers ==
Peticov has created posters, book, and album covers for varied events and artists, both in Brazil and abroad, including:

- X National Congress of Education
- PrimaVera Festival in São Paulo (1969) - cancelled by the dictatorship 48 hours before its undertaking
- Re Nudo Pop Festival (1973)
- Cover of the album "Visões" by Léo Gandelman (1981)
- Art Expo '86 - Inauguration of the Javits Convention Center (1986)
- Heitor Villa-Lobos 100th Birthday Celebration (1986/1987)
- Cover of the album "Festival" by Lee Ritenour (1988)
- 38th Festa do Peão de Boiadeiro de Barretos (1993)
- The Phoenix Symphony (1993/1994)
- Monark Turismo (1994)
- Heineken Concerts - São Paulo/Rio de Janeiro (1995)
- Sofia National Library - Creative Bulgarians Abroad (1996)
- Rock in Rio and Coca-Cola (2001)

== See also ==
- List of Brazilian painters
