= Bonadei =

Bonadei is a surname. Notable people with the surname include:

- Aldo Bonadei (1906–1974), Brazilian painter
- Laurent Bonadei (born 1969), French football coach and former player
