= Manuel Martins =

Brazilian artist

Manuel Joaquim Martins, usually known as Manuel Martins (October 24, 1911 – 1979) was a Brazilian artist that worked with painting, illustration, drawing, engraving, sculpture and embroidery.

Martins was born and died in São Paulo. The son of Portuguese immigrants, he grew up in the industrial suburb of Brás. In 1924, he started to work in embroidery. Started in 1931 artistic studies with the sculptor Vicente Larocca. Then he attended classes at Escola de Belas Artes de São Paulo. He joined the Santa Helena Group in 1935. The group included Alfredo Volpi, Francisco Rebolo and Fulvio Pennacchi, among others. He shared atelier with Mario Zanini. In 1937 he showed his works of the Família Artística Paulista, also known as FAP.

During the 1960s, he started engraving metal. Parallel to his painting he worked as a book illustrator, as well as a magazine illustrator, working for "O cortiço" and "Bahia de Todos os Santos".

His works convey themes of social concern, including social classes and working life. He classically painted São Paulo landscapes, which were treated by the media as examples of "life-reporting".
