= Lucatelli =

Lucatelli is an Italian surname. Notable people with the surname include:

- Adriano B. Lucatelli (born 1966), Swiss entrepreneur in the financial services industry
- Giuseppe Lucatelli (1751-1828), Italian painter and architect
- Marcela Lucatelli (born 1988), Brazilian composer
- Pietro Lucatelli (c. 1630-after 1690), Italian painter

== See also ==
- Locatelli
- Lucarelli
