= Pennacchio =

Pennacchio is a surname. Notable people with the surname include:

- Joseph Pennacchio (born 1955), American Republican Party politician
- Len A. Pennacchio, American molecular biologist
- Salvatore Pennacchio (born 1952), Catholic archbishop and diplomat of the Holy See

== See also ==
- Pennacchi
