= Tadáskía =

Brazilian contemporary artist

Tadáskía (born 1993, Rio de Janeiro) is a Brazilian artist, educator, and writer. In 2024, the Museum of Modern Art (MoMA) in New York acquired her piece "ave preta mística mystical black bird (2022)." In addition, MoMA organized a solo show for the artist called Projects: Tadáskía that ran from 24 May to 14 October 2024.

In 2025, Tadáskía was included in the list Time 100 Next of "the world's most influential rising stars."

== Individual exhibitions ==
- Projects: Tadáskía (MoMA, New York) - 2024
- As parecidas (Galeria Madragoa, Lisbon, Portugal) - 2023
- Rara ocellet (Galeria Joan Prats, Barcelona, Spain) - 2023
- noite dia (Sé, São Paulo, Brazil) - 2022

== Group exhibitions ==
- 35th São Paulo Biennial (Biennial Pavilion, São Paulo) - 2023
- 37th Panorama of Brazilian Art: "Sob as cinzas, brasa" (Museu de Arte Moderna (MAM), São Paulo) - 2022
- Eros Rising: Visions of the Erotic in Latin American Art (ISLAA, New York) - 2022
- JAIMES (Triangle Asterídes, Marsailles, France) - 2022
- The Silence of Tired Tongues (Framer Framed, Amsterdam) - 2022
- Uma história natural das ruínas (Pivô, São Paulo) - 2021
- Hábito/habitante (EAV Parque Lage) - 2021
- Casa Carioca (Museu de Arte do Rio de Janeiro) - 2020–21
- Esqueleto (Imperial Palace, Rio de Janeiro) - 2019–2020
- Estopim e segredo (EAV Parque Lage, Rio de Janeiro) - 2019–2020

== Awards ==
- Prêmio PIPA (2020): nominated
- Prêmio PIPA (2023): nominated
- K21 Global Art Award (2025): winner
