= Fulvio Pennacchi =

Italian-Brazilian artist

Fulvio Pennacchi (December 27, 1905, in Villa Collemandina – October 5, 1992, in São Paulo) was an Italian-Brazilian artist who specialized in painted murals and made ceramics.

He was part of the Santa Helena Group, together with Alfredo Volpi, Francisco Rebolo, Aldo Bonadei, Alfredo Rizzotti, Mario Zanini, Humberto Rosa and others.

His painting is sensitive and personal, particularly in the interpretation of major biblical themes and the lives of saints, owing to his childhood marked by a Catholic religious education. He was remarkable also for his interpretation of the caipira world.

== See also ==
- Alfredo Volpi
- List of Brazilian painters
