= Lucarelli =

Lucarelli is an Italian surname. Notable people with the surname include:

- Alessandro Lucarelli (born 1977), Italian footballer
- Carlo Lucarelli (born 1960), Italian crime-writer, TV presenter, and magazine editor
- Carole Lucarelli (born 1972), French former professional tennis player
- Cristiano Lucarelli (born 1975), Italian footballer
- Delio Lucarelli (1939–2024), Italian Roman Catholic prelate
- Ricardo Lucarelli (born 1992), Brazilian volleyball player
- Vittorio Lucarelli (1928–2008), an Italian fencer

== See also ==
- Lucarelli, Radda in Chianti, village in the province of Siena, Tuscany, Italy
- Estádio Moisés Lucarelli, football stadium located in Campinas, Brazil
- Lucatelli
