= Marcela Maus =

American immunologist

- Education: University of Pennsylvania; Memorial Sloan Kettering Cancer Center
- Scientific career
- Workplaces: Harvard Medical School
- Academic advisors: Carl H. June

Marcela V. Maus is a professor of medicine at Harvard Medical School and director of the Cellular Immunotherapy Program at Massachusetts General Hospital. She works on immunotherapy for the treatment of cancer, using genetically engineered T cells to target malignancies (cancer).

== Early life and education ==
Maus attended Stuyvesant High School in New York City. She was an undergraduate at Massachusetts Institute of Technology, where she majored in biology and literature. She earned her MD–PhD at the University of Pennsylvania, where she trained in the laboratory of Carl H. June, developing methods to expand T-cell populations, for medical therapies. She completed residency in Internal Medicine at the Hospital of the University of Pennsylvania from 2006 to 2008. She completed fellowship in Hematology and Oncology at the Memorial Sloan Kettering Cancer Center from 2008 to 2012.

== Research and career ==
In 2012 Maus returned to the University of Pennsylvania, where she became an assistant professor and director of translational medicine. Since 2015 Maus has worked in the Massachusetts General Hospital and Dana–Farber Cancer Institute. Here she leads the Cellular Immunotherapy Program which translates her research into clinical trials for patients with malignancies.

Maus develops chimeric antigen receptor (CAR)-T cells for cancer patients. She demonstrated that it is possible to use engineered CAR-T cells to identify and kill tumour cells that express a specific protein, EGFRvllI (variant III). She has also conducted research that examines using CAR-T cells in combination with checkpoint inhibitors to treat other cancers. The cells can breakthrough the blood–brain barrier, infiltrate a tumour and illicit an immune response. Maus has used CRISPR-Cas9 to develop the CAR-T cells that incorporate a molecule called Bi-specific T-cell engager (BiTE). Bi-specific T cell engager continues to produce short-lived molecules that attack the tumour until it is destroyed. BiTEs contains two molecular arms, one which catches an antigen EGFR target on the tumour cells and the other locates a CD3 receptor of a nearby T cell. Once the target and T cell receptor are close to one another it can destroy the cancer cell. The BiTEs force the tumor and T cells together. Usually BiTE is too large to cross the blood-brain barrier, but as CAR-T cells can pass through, they can produce the BiTE inside the brain.

Maus is on the leadership team of MicroMedicine, a start-up which creates automated microfluidics for targeted cell isolation from biological fluids. Maus was awarded a Damon Runyon Cancer Research Foundation Stage 2 fellowship to develop CAR-T cells that can target abnormal antigens made from oncogenes. She has turned CAR-T cells into "armoured vehicles" which can target glioblastoma brain tumours.

=== Selected publications ===
- Maus, Marcela (2007). "CD8+ T-cell responses to adeno-associated virus capsid in humans". Nature Medicine. 13 (4): 419–422. doi:10.1038/nm1549. PMID 17369837. S2CID 42965337.
- Maus, Marcela (2013). "Cardiovascular toxicity and titin cross-reactivity of affinity-enhanced T cells in myeloma and melanoma". Blood. 122 (6): 863–871. doi:10.1182/blood-2013-03-490565. PMC 3743463. PMID 23770775.
- Maus, Marcela (2014). "Antibody-modified T cells: CARs take the front seat for hematologic malignancies". Blood. 123 (17): 2625–2635. doi:10.1182/blood-2013-11-492231. PMC 3999751. PMID 24578504.
