= Nicson =

Brazilian painter

NicSon's 1992 "Wheat Crop", palette knife (oil on canvas) painting

Joao Feliciano Sr. (NicSon) (22 January 1946 - 24 February 2024) was a contemporary Brazilian painter mostly known for his particular skills in palette knife (oil on canvas) painting. Also, one of the few autodidact impressionists whose art has reached commercial and critical success in Brazil during his lifetime.
