= Marcela Zamora =

Salvadoran born-Nicaraguan documentary director and journalist

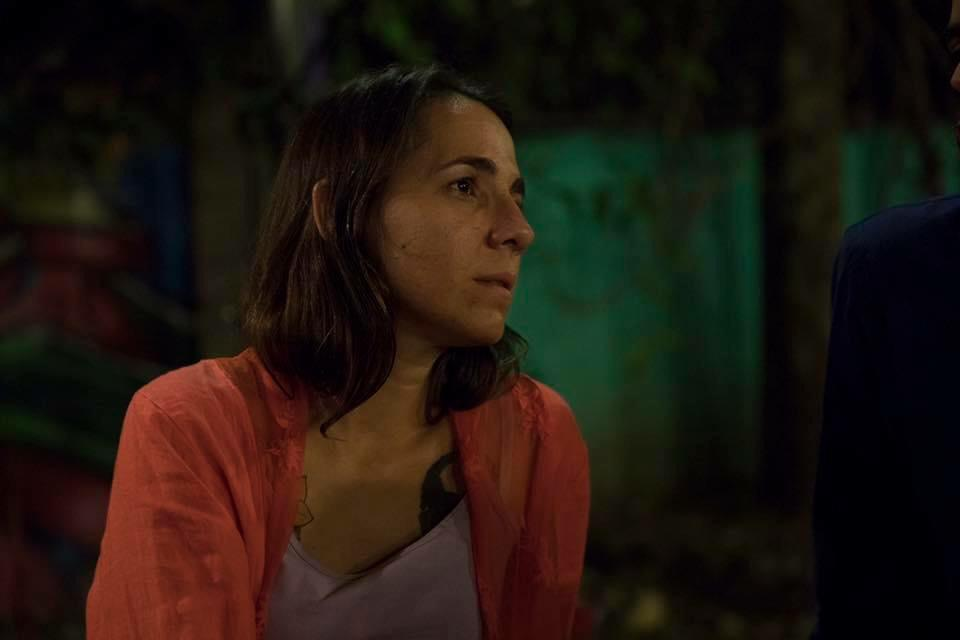
- Born: 1980 (age 44–45); El Salvador
- Occupation(s): Journalist, documentary director

Marcela Zamora Chamorro (born 1980) is a Salvadoran born-Nicaraguan documentary director and journalist. She has worked in El Salvador, Nicaragua, Mexico, Venezuela, and Cuba.

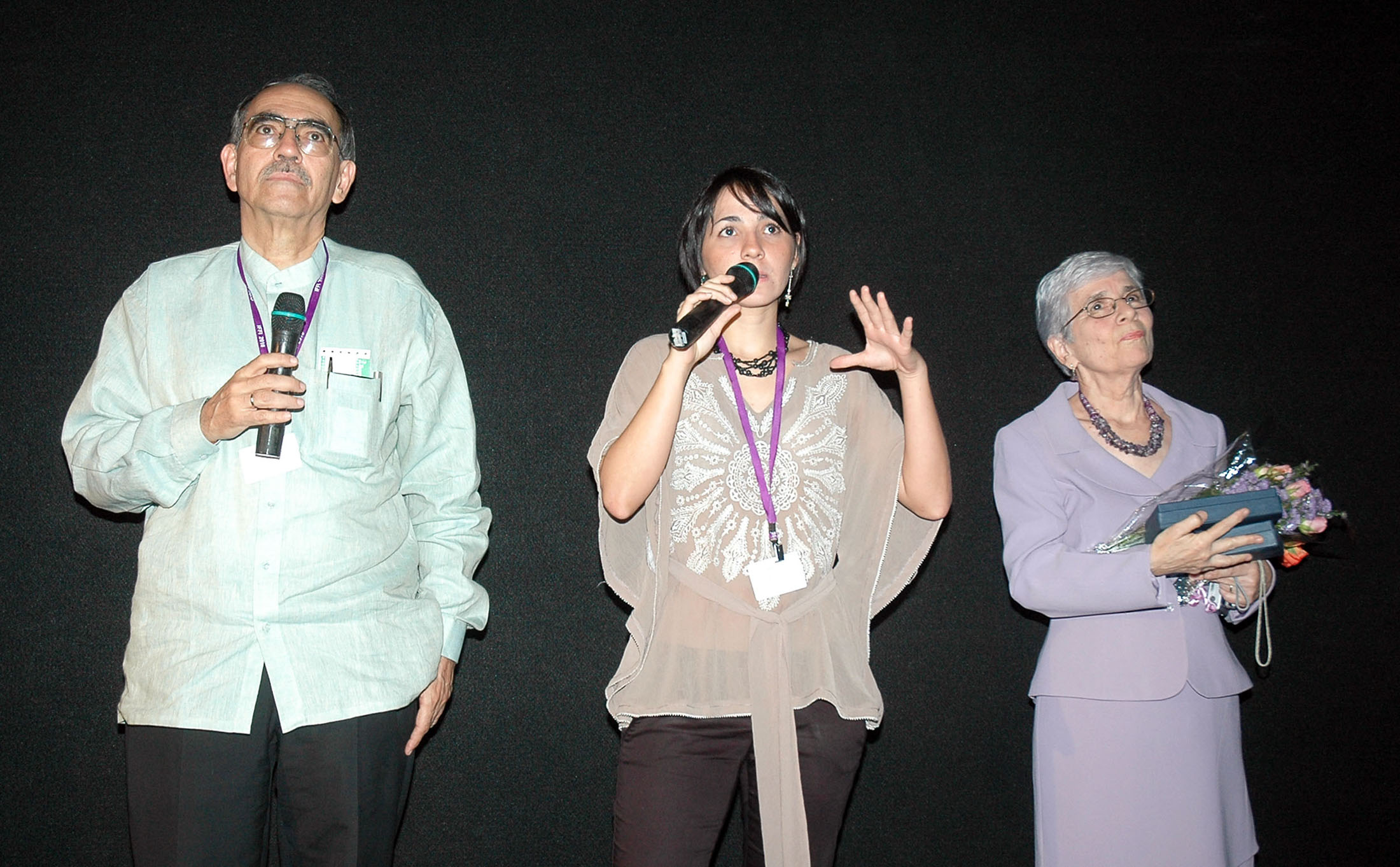
Zamora (center) presenting the film María en tierra de nadie, at IFFI (2010)

== Career ==
Zamora studied journalism in Costa Rica and documentary film at the Escuela Internacional de Cine y Televisión (ElCTV) in San Antonio de los Baños, Cuba. Her films, mostly documentaries, focus on the issues of human rights and gender. She has worked for Al Jazeera and teleSUR, and has directed multiple documentary initiatives of Salvadoran digital newspaper El Faro.

In her films and documentaries, Zamora also addresses the problems of immigration, exploitation, and misery caused by the violence propagated by governments, paramilitary groups, or street gangs in both urban and rural areas. Her films have won awards at international festivals in Europe, the United States, and Asia.

Zamora's first medium-length film was Xochiquetzal: La casa de las flores bellas (2007). It was produced by Cuban EICTV and filmed in Mexico, and is about a brothel populated by prostitutes of advanced age. Her first long-form documentary, María en tierra de nadie (2010) was co-produced with El Faro and earned recognition and reactions at several festivals in multiple countries. The documentary tells the story of Central American migrants who were subjected to kidnapping, murder, rape, and robbery in their difficult journey of 3,000 kilometers from their home countries to the United States.

In 2011, Chamorro co-directed, along with Bernat Camps Parera and Daniel Valencia, Las masacres del mozote, a short film about the El Mozote massacre, in which the Salvadoran army killed over 800 civilians in El Mozote in December 1981.

In El cuarto de los Huesos (2015), Chamorro tells the story of, in her own words, "mothers who search for their children who have gone missing as a result of gang violence. It is a story that describes the efforts of Salvadoran forensic doctors who search for the remains of the missing in order to reunite them with their mothers."

Chamorro has done speaking engagements at several American universities and has been a judge at international festivals such as ZINEBI (Spain), MARFICI (Argentina), and the International Festival of Human Rights Films (Switzerland).

In 2015, Chamorro founded, along with Julio López and Karla Alvarenga, her own production company: Kino Glaz Films. That same year, she was awarded the prize given out by Amnesty International at the DocsBarcelona Film Festival.

In 2014 and 2015, Forbes magazine selected Chamorro as one of the most influential women in Central America.

== Filmography ==
- 2007: Xochiquetzal
- 2010: El estudiante (Short)
- 2010: Culpables de nacimiento (Short)
- 2011: María en tierra de nadie
- 2011: Las masacres del mozote (Short codirected with Bernat Camps Parera and Daniel Valencia)
- 2012: Ellos sabían que yo era una niña (Short)
- 2013: El espejo roto
- 2013: Las ruinas de Lourdes (Short)
- 2013: Las muchachas (Short)
- 2014: Las Aradas: masacre en seis actos
- 2015: El cuarto de los huesos
- 2016: Los ofendidos
