= Lucas Pennacchi =

Brazilian artist (born 1960)

Lucas Pennacchi (born 1960 in São Paulo) is a Brazilian artist who works with painting, drawing and engraving.

Pennacchi started to draw and paint at school and with his father, Brazilian artist Fulvio Pennacchi. He went to a school of architecture, where he studied art and drawing, but left in the third year.

His themes deal with landscapes and seascapes, and compositions with birds and fish. His work is currently in private collections and art galleries. He's a frequent collaborator with art publications, and in 2004 he was theme for a feature of Metrópolis, a widely known TV Cultura program.

He learned mosaic on his own and teaches open courses at the MuBE National Museum of Sculpture in São Paulo.
