= Marcela Rizzotto =

Argentine Paralympic swimmer

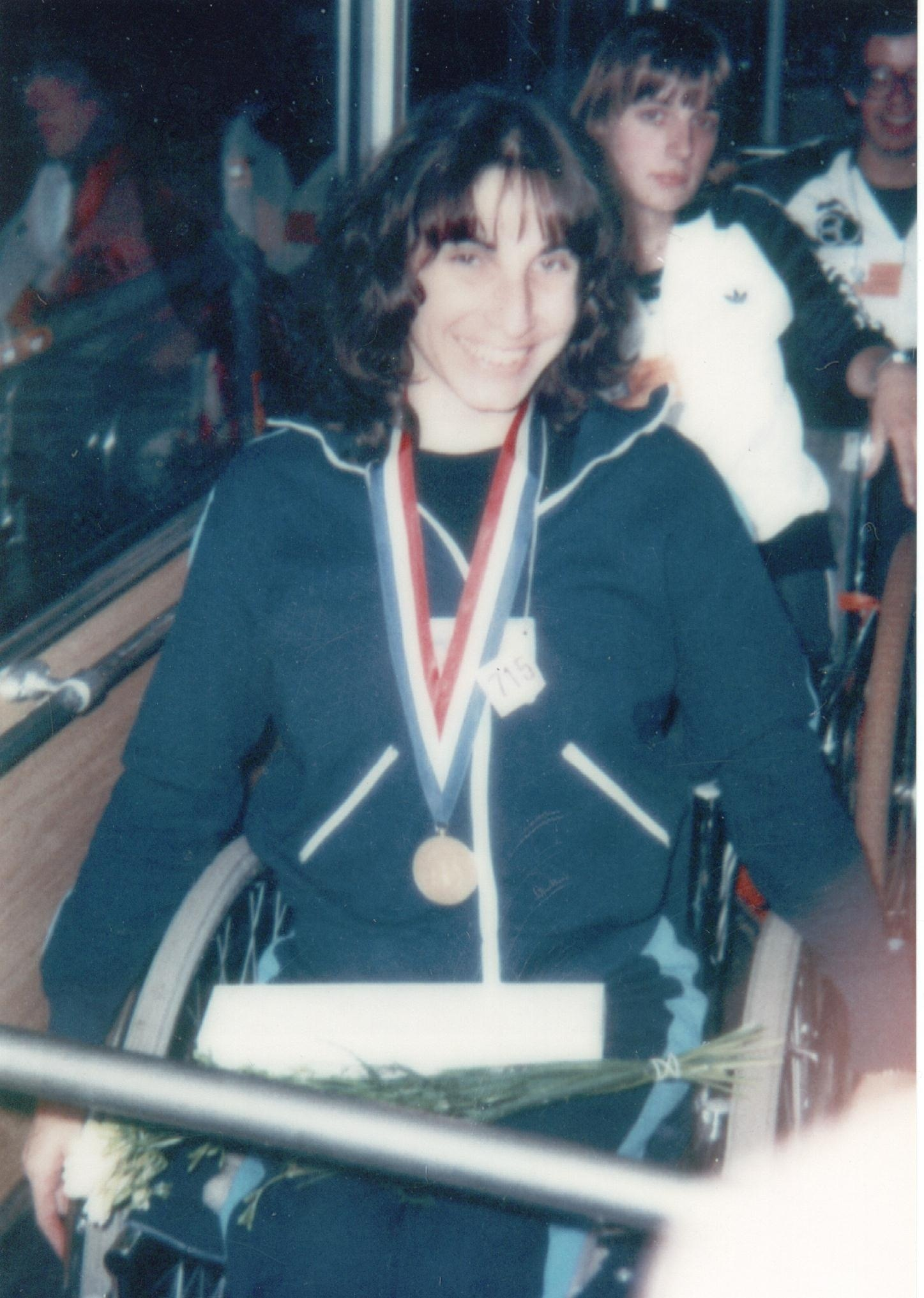
- After winning the gold medal in freestyle at Arnhem in 1980

Personal information
- Born: 21 April 1948 (age 78) Rosario, Santa Fe, Argentina

Sport
- Sport: Paralympic athletics Paralympic swimming
Medal record
Representing Argentina
Paralympic Games
Swimming
Gold medal – first place	1980 Arnhem	50m freestyle 3
Gold medal – first place	1980 Arnhem	50m breaststroke 3
Silver medal – second place	1980 Arnhem	25m butterfly 3
Bronze medal – third place	1976 Toronto	25m butterfly 3
Bronze medal – third place	1976 Toronto	3x25m individual medley 3
Bronze medal – third place	1980 Arnhem	50m backstroke 3

Marcela Adriana Rizzotto (born 21 April 1948) is an Argentine former Paralympic swimmer who competed at international swimming competitions. She has six medals in swimming, she also competed in the athletics at the 1976 Summer Paralympics.

Rizzotto has a plaque in honour of her success at the Paralympic Games in Paseo de los Olímpicos in her hometown.
