= Antônio Rafael Pinto Bandeira =

Brazilian painter (1863–1896)

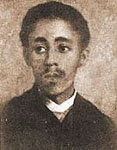
- Born: March 9, 1863; Niterói
- Died: August 28, 1896 (aged 33); Rio de Janeiro
- Occupations: Painter; art professor

Antônio Rafael Pinto Bandeira (9 March 1863 – 28 August 1896) was an Afro-Brazilian painter and art professor. Bandeira is noted for his contributions to regional art education and his depictions of Brazilian landscapes and society.

== Biography ==
Born in Rio de Janeiro in 1863, he was descended from slaves and his father was a tailor. Bandeira displayed an early talent for drawing. At the age of sixteen, he entered the Academia Imperial de Belas Artes (AIBA). From 1879 to 1884, he worked under Victor Meirelles and João Zeferino da Costa, specializing in portraiture and historical painting. His academic style blended European techniques with Brazilian themes, reflecting the era’s cultural tensions between tradition and modernity. He was a regular participant in the "Exposições Geral de Belas Artes", where he won the Gold Medal for history painting in 1883. His first personal exhibition came in 1886 at AIBA.

In 1887, after failing to win a contest that would have enabled him to study in Europe and urged on by his friend Firmino Monteiro, he moved to Salvador, where he became the Professor of Design and Landscapes at the "Liceu de Artes e Ofícios".

Returning to his hometown in 1890 he tried, unsuccessfully, to establish his own art school. He continued to exhibit successfully, but became depressed at having his efforts to launch the school repeatedly thwarted. He drowned in Guanabara Bay, while attempting to launch a boat, although his family and the press suggested that it may have been suicide. The body was not recovered for almost two weeks, so he was buried without an autopsy.

His painting "Lenhador" (Woodcutter) appeared on a two-part commemorative stamp in 2013, together with a painting by Georgian artist Niko Pirosmani, to mark the establishment of diplomatic relations between the two countries.

== Selected paintings ==
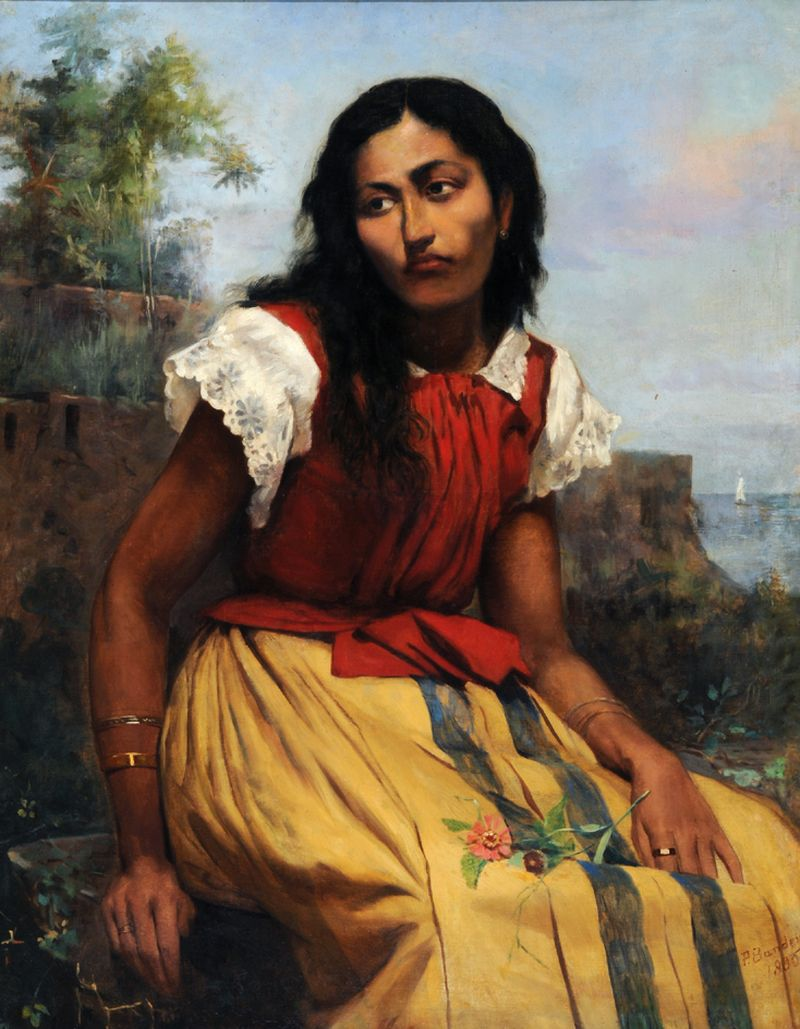
Young Woman Sitting

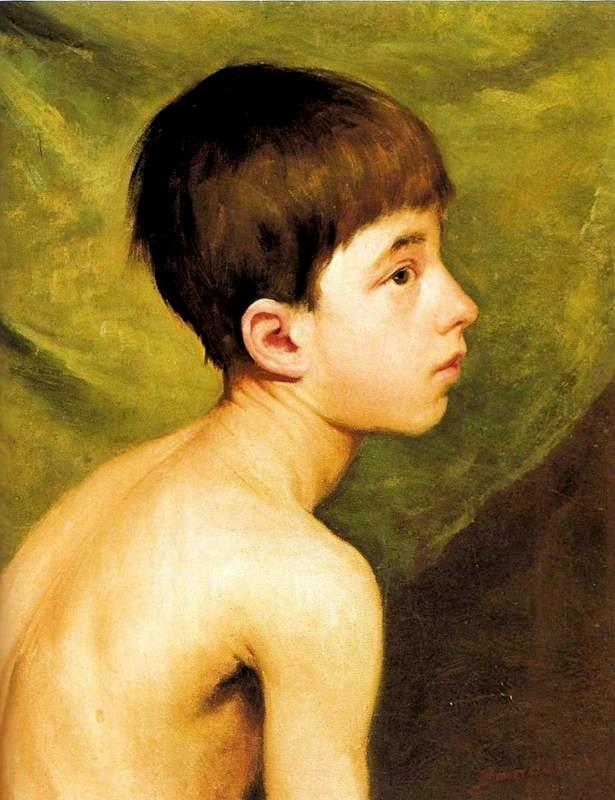
Portrait of a Student

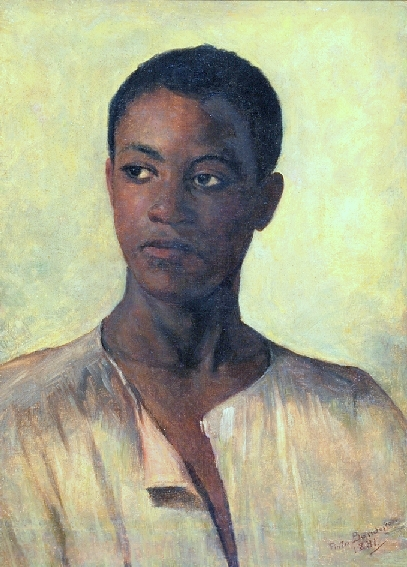
Man's Head

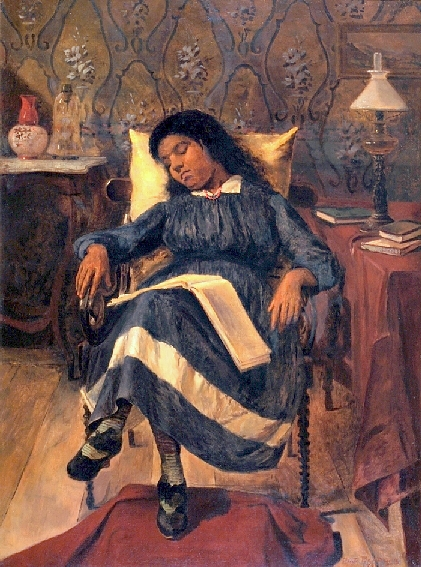
Sleeping Woman

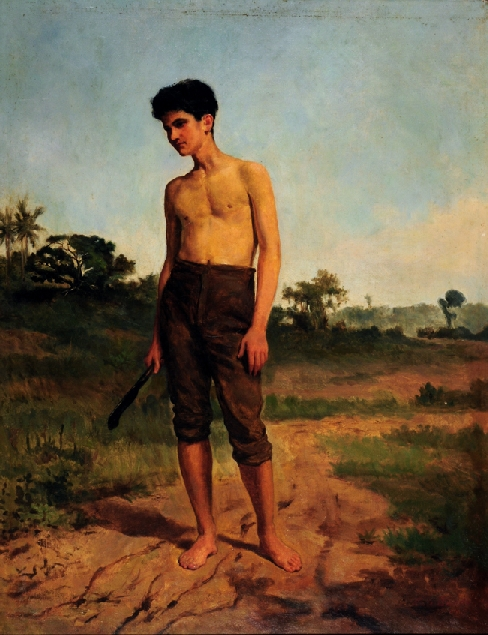
The Woodcutter
