= Solange Magalhães =

French-born Brazilian painter

Solange Magalhães is a painter.

She was born in France in 1939. Her family moved to Rio de Janeiro, Brazil when she was 13 years old. In 1963, after three years of studying theoretical physics, she chose to be a painter.

She has experimented with various painting techniques – oil, acrylic, watercolor, India ink – on different materials such as canvas, paper and masonite.

Her first solo exhibition took place in 1968 at the Galeria Goeldi in Rio, invited by the art-critic Clarival do Prado Valladares and introduced by writer Clarice Lispector. Since that time her work has been shown in numerous solo and group shows in the major Brazilian cities of Rio de Janeiro, Recife and São Paulo, as well as in Germany and France.

Of particular note was the 1980 exhibition at the Studien Galerie at Stuttgart University in Germany, invited by its director, professor Max Bense, and two exhibitions in Rio: Solange Magalhães, 30 Years of Painting, a Circular Vision of the World at the Fine Arts Museum in Rio de Janeiro (1995); and From Chaos to Cosmos at the Espaço Cultural Correios (2007).
