= Andrew John Yellowbear Jr. =

American murderer

Andrew John Yellowbear Jr. (born September 5, 1974) was the defendant in one of Wyoming's most notorious capital murder trials. He was convicted in April 2006 in Thermopolis, Wyoming, of premeditated first-degree murder in the death of his 22-month-old daughter Marcela Hope Yellowbear. He was subsequently sentenced to life in prison without the possibility of parole.

== Description of the crime ==
Authorities say Marcela Hope Yellowbear was tortured to death over a period of several weeks, starting around May 15, 2004, to July 2, 2004. According to the testimony of the girl's mother, Macalia Blackburn (born December 20, 1981), who was sentenced to 60 years in prison for her role as an accessory, Yellowbear beat the girl daily in the couple's Riverton, Wyoming, apartment using a variety of objects, including the handle of a claw hammer, a sports sandal, a two-by-four, and a plastic stabilizer bar from a child's swingset.

Blackburn said she was too scared of Yellowbear to stop him from hurting the girl. Yellowbear had a history of domestic violence against the woman, a fact that came out in his roughly three-week trial, but only while the jury was absent as Judge David Park did not want to prejudice the case.

Yellowbear continually denied hurting the girl, blaming the abuse on Blackburn.

According to an affidavit from the Riverton Police Department, the girl suffered from "a skull fracture to the back of her head; numerous traumas to her head resulting in blood clotting between her scalp and her skull; a laceration below her chin extending to the underside of her tongue; a broken right arm; third-degree burns to her right hand fingers; large abrasions to her buttocks; a laceration and possible burn to the bottom of her left foot; numerous pinch and nail marks; deep tissue bruises over the course of her body; and distinct dehydration."

== Post-trial legal proceedings ==
After he was convicted, Yellowbear filed a petition in United States District Court for the District of Wyoming seeking to set aside the conviction on the grounds that only tribal and federal courts, rather than the state courts of Wyoming, had jurisdiction over the case. His petition was supported by the Northern Arapaho and Eastern Shoshone tribes. Both Yellowbear and Blackburn are members of the Northern Arapaho tribe, which shares the Wind River Indian Reservation with the Eastern Shoshone.

Yellowbear's lawyers argued for the venue change because the crime took place in Riverton, an incorporated city that is landlocked by an Indian reservation. Trials of felonies by American Indians within the boundaries of a reservation are heard in federal district court, while misdemeanors are heard in the respective tribal courts of the reservation in which a particular crime occurred.

In 2008, Yellowbear filed a lawsuit against the Wyoming Department of Corrections claiming the state violated his constitutional rights by depriving him of ten bald eagle feathers for use in religious ceremonies. In late July 2008, Judge Alan Bond Johnson of the United States District Court for the District of Wyoming approved a settlement allowing Yellowbear to get four eagle feathers.
