= Ferreira Louis Marius =

Ferreira Louis Marius Amorim de Moraes, (born March 13, 1953, in Santos, São Paulo, Brazil) is a modern Brazilian painter and supporter of naïve art. He began his artistic career in 1979 and currently lives and works in Peruíbe, São Paulo, Brazil.

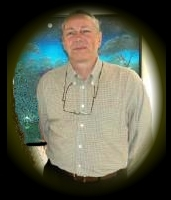
Ferreira

== Life and career ==
The works of Ferreira depict the images of paradise of Atlantic Forest, its birds, its fountains and its natives. His work looks forward to show the truth revealed every day in this region, more precisely at the Juréia-Itatins Ecological Station. Since young, in addition to painting, also attracted interest in music, influenced by the grandfather who was a conductor and pianist. His mother was also pianist and encouraged him to be interested in art.

Ferreira, who lived part of his childhood with the grandparents, played with the leftovers of canvases and paints which his grandmother, who was painting on porcelain and created small works of painting, offered him. When a teenager, lived with his parents in São Vicente - coast of São Paulo - and liked to attend a town of fishermen in the region, called Guamium. Spent much of the time in this community, and with the fishermen, many of them caiçaras, learned to make pirogues, entanglement, canoes and kept learning his fishing techniques, eventually becoming a professional fisherman.

While pleased with such activities and earned a living this way, Ferreira has never stopped drawing. Scribbled and painted scenes from daily life, of landscapes of the seashore, of bars, boats and ports, using what was at hand, coal, crayons, colored pencil or ink leftovers from painting the boats.

Later, when the fishing became impossible because of environmental degradation, started to work at the port of Santos, and it was there that he realized that the tourists were interested in his painting style, and then started to paint and sell small canvases with acrylic ink. The beginning was difficult, but still, he realized it could improve, expand his horizons and live of the sale of his artwork.

Between 1989 and 1990, had already sold his works in the Republic Square in São Paulo, the traditional art fair in that city. In the 1990s began to exhibit his work in the gallery Jacques Ardie in São Paulo. The recognition was immediate. He sold all work in his 1st exhibition individual and started to export to France and the United States. His work began to have great international acceptance and, since that, has made worldwide exhibitions and his canvases figure museums and private collections in several countries.

Ferreira puts in the canvases his experience, which his work reveals to be very personal and internalized. He interprets the reality in which he worked and the universe where he lives, with extreme visual sincerity. His style is marked with bright colors, a lot of imagination and the power of synthesis. This brings to his work lots of acceptance in the USA and in France, also in Israel, Canada, Spain, Switzerland, Mexico, and Japan. Ferreira develops a naïve line based on intuition, which rose up naturally and stays in constant technical improvement, with current interest in the Dutch masters.

Above all, Ferreira's art has an aesthetic concern. It doesn't surrender to individual preferences of the observer, but looks for the best way to express his inner world through a professional attitude concerning the arts. This means an intense and serious action against accommodation. The ways of maturation of his personal style include a visionary attitude. Ferreira has never quit researching, about topics as well as technique, in order to unite the power of intuition with an aesthetical research about Jureia's universe. The painter is not limited to repeating formulas, even if they appear to work.

One of the fascinations of being an autodidact is precisely in the power of not following any certain school. His production becomes more and more sophisticated by the commitment of making better works, developing variations according to his own capacity of working elements like color and composition.

The fidelity to individualism of own ideas and the commitment to construct an increasingly cohesive plastic work, without losing the lyricism and a distinguished poetic, ensure Ferreira's position as an authentically naïve artist. The compositions with mountains, forests and rivers or inlets establish a plastic balance, in terms of formal elements and, above all, philosophical, since Ferreira's canvases don't transmit disquiet. They are a manifestation of serenity in the troubled universe of the 21st century.

To gallerist Munira Calluf, owner of "Um Lugar ao Sol" Gallery of Arts, Ferreira is maybe today's most outstanding naïve name in Brazil.

== Exhibitions and awards ==
- Solo Exhibitions
  - 1979 São Vicente Yacht Club, São Paulo
  - 1980 Secretary of Culture of São Joao da Boa Vista, São Paulo
  - 1991 Medical Association of Santos, São Paulo
  - 1994 Jacques Ardies Gallery, São Paulo
  - 1997 Jacques Ardies Gallery, São Paulo
  - 2004 Jacques Ardies Gallery, São Paulo
  - 2006 Galerie Jacqueline Bricard, Lourmarin, France
  - 2007 Um Lugar ao Sol Art Gallery, Curitiba, Parana, Brazil

.

- Prizes
  - 1980 Honorable Mention, Expofarps, University of Art of Santos, São Paulo - Brazil
  - 1991 1st Place, Folklore Art Group, Town Council of Santos, São Paulo - Brazil
  - 1997 first place prize of the jury - Chapel Art Show – São Paulo - Brazil
    - First place in the popular vote - Chapel Art Show – São Paulo - Brazil
