= Aldo Bonadei =

Brazilian painter

Aldo Cláudio Felipe Bonadei, also known as Aldo Bonadei (June 17, 1906 in São Paulo – January 16, 1974 in São Paulo) was a Brazilian painter of Italian descent.

== Early life ==
Between 1923 and 1928, Aldo studied with Brazilian academic painter Pedro Alexandrino and frequently visited the studio of Italian painters Antonio Rocco and Amadeo Scavone who also lived in São Paulo. During this period, he studied at the Liceu de Artes e Oficios de São Paulo, where he took courses on sketching and Fine Arts.

=== Italian Influence ===
In the beginning of the 1930s, Aldo decided to move to Florence to attend the Florence Academy of Arts (Accademia di Belle Arti di Firenze) where he trained as a painter with the Italian artists Felice Carena and Ennio Pozzi. When he returned from Italy, Aldo shared his studio with other fellow artists such as Francisco Rebollo, Alfredo Volpi, Mario Zanini, Manuel Martins and Fulvio Penacchi, forming group that later became known as Grupo Santa Helena.

== A Pioneers School ==
In 1949, Aldo began to teach at what became the first school of Modern Art in São Paulo, Escola Livre de Artes Plásticas. His varied interests led him to work in poetry, fashion and theater. He was culturally important in the 1930s and 1940s, when modern art burgeoned in Brazil, becoming a pioneer of Brazilian abstract art.

At the end of the 1950s, Aldo worked as costume designer for Nydia Lícia & Sérgio Cardoso company, and in two films by Walter Hugo Khoury.
