= Constância Nery =

Constância Nery (born 1936 in Ipiguá) is a Latin American Naïve art painter. Nery is considered a revolutionary naïve art painter in the Latin American landscape which yielded a number of widely known artist in this space and one of the youngest selling naïve art painters today. Nery resides in Curitiba, Brazil.

== Prizes ==
- 1984 Bronze Medal, International Center of Contemporary Art, Paris
- 1985 Silver Medal, Winter Salon of Lisbon, Lisbon, Portugal
- 2002 Suisse Prize and Europe Prize of Primitive & Modern Painting, Gallery Pro Arte Kasper Morges, Switzerland

== Public collections ==
- Musée d'Art Naïf – Max Fourny, Paris
- MAN Naïve Art Museum, Beraut, France
- Fundacao Cultural Solar do rosario, Curitiba, Brazil
