= Fábio Innecco =

Brazilian artist

- Born: February 14, 1936 (age 89); Niterói, Rio de Janeiro, Brazil
- Education: Federal University of Rio de Janeiro
- Known for: Painting
- Website: Official website

Fábio Rogério Innecco (born February 14, 1936) is a Brazilian painter, landscaper, researcher and assistant to graphic arts. Innecco was born in the city of Niterói, Rio de Janeiro. Between 1958 and 1963 he took lessons in drawing with Abelardo Zaluar and lessons in painting with Henrique Cavalheiro. At this time he took a course at the National School of Fine Arts at the Federal University of Rio de Janeiro (UFRJ). His work is cited in the Brazilian Dictionary of Arts, published by the Book National Institute of the Education and Culture Ministry (MEC) in the book by Frederico de Moraes: Chronology of Arts in Rio de Janeiro (Topbooks publisher) and in the book "Niterói and its painters (Exito publisher - Enitur).

Innecco obtained two prizes in the 1960s. One, in 1962, the Esso Painting Prize - Salon of Students, promoted by the students' union at the National School of Fine Arts and the other, in 1965, awarded by MEC, the Exemption Prize of the Jury at the Salon of Modern Art.

== Works ==
Since the early sixties he has taken part in several collective exhibitions, including The Salon in aid of the Spanish exiled (1963), in São Paulo, the Salon of Modern Art (1965), Nine Artists, Embramove Gallery (1983), Six Figurative Artists, Casa Grande Theatre (1985), XVI Salon of the Carioca Art in Rio de Janeiro (1992). In Niterói, he has participated in the Paschoal Carlos Magno Cultural Centre collective exhibitions (1991/1997) and in the Six Artists, at the painter Bernadii's studio. Abroad, he participated in two collective exhibitions at the New Visual Gallery, in Frankfurt, Germany in 1993 and 1994.

The artist held individual painting exhibitions at the Olivia Kann Gallery (1987), the Embramove Gallery (1988) and at the Marfebrás (1988) in Rio de Janeiro. In Niterói, he held individual exhibitions at the Sanitária Fluminense Cultural Centre (1988). In 1996 he held a drawing exhibition at the Paschoal Carlos Magno Cultural Centre in Niterói.

His works are part of the private collections of many Brazilian personalities such as Luis Eduardo Guinle, Luis Paulo Conde, Marcelo Conde, Alexandre Baldaque Guimarães, Ruy Baldaque Guimarães and Viviani Soares Sampaio.

== See also ==
- Official Website
- Biography at niteroiartes.com (in Portuguese)
