= Aldir Mendes de Souza =

Brazilian painter and physician

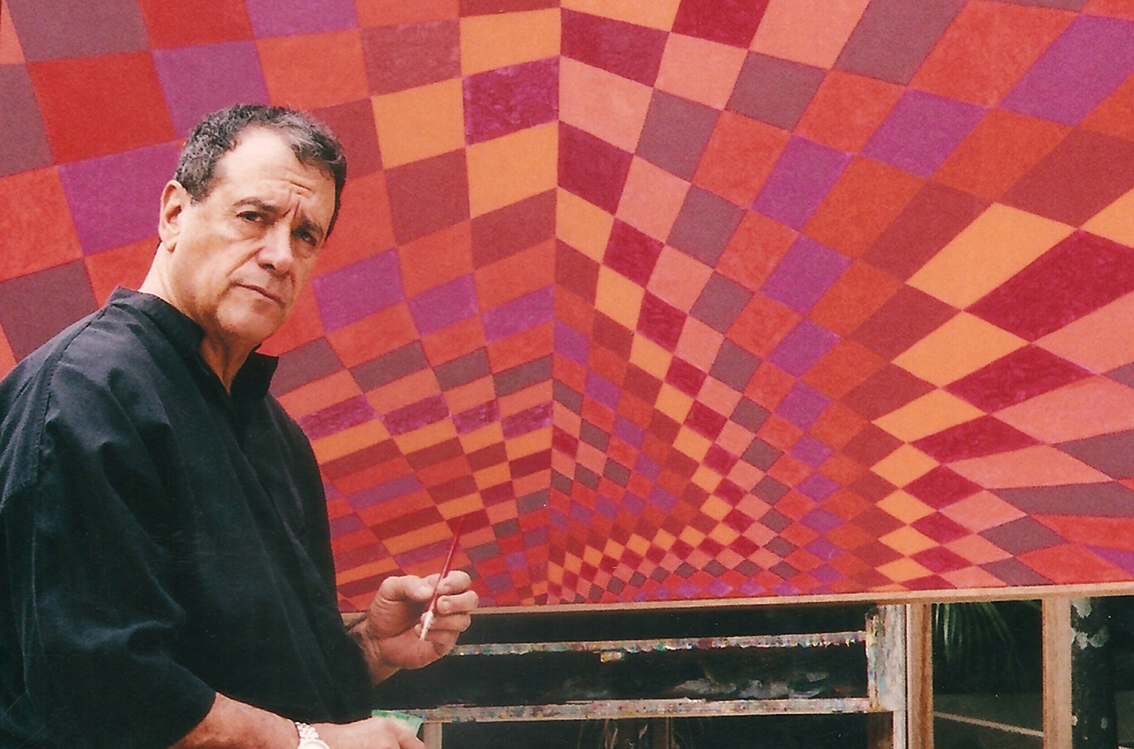
- Aldir Mendes de Souza
- Born: 1941; São Paulo, Brazil
- Died: 2007 (aged 64–65)
- Occupation: Physician
- Known for: Paintings

Aldir Mendes de Souza (1941, São Paulo – 2007) was a Brazilian painter and physician.

Mendes de Souza's work includes Paisagem Agrícola, which was auctioned at James Lisboa Auction in 2019; Côres do Campo (1987) auctioned in 2010; Planos agricolas no. 20 (1987) auctioned in 2009; and Planos agricolas nr. 11 (1987) auctioned in 2007.
