= Marcela Cantuária =

Brazilian visual artist with international career

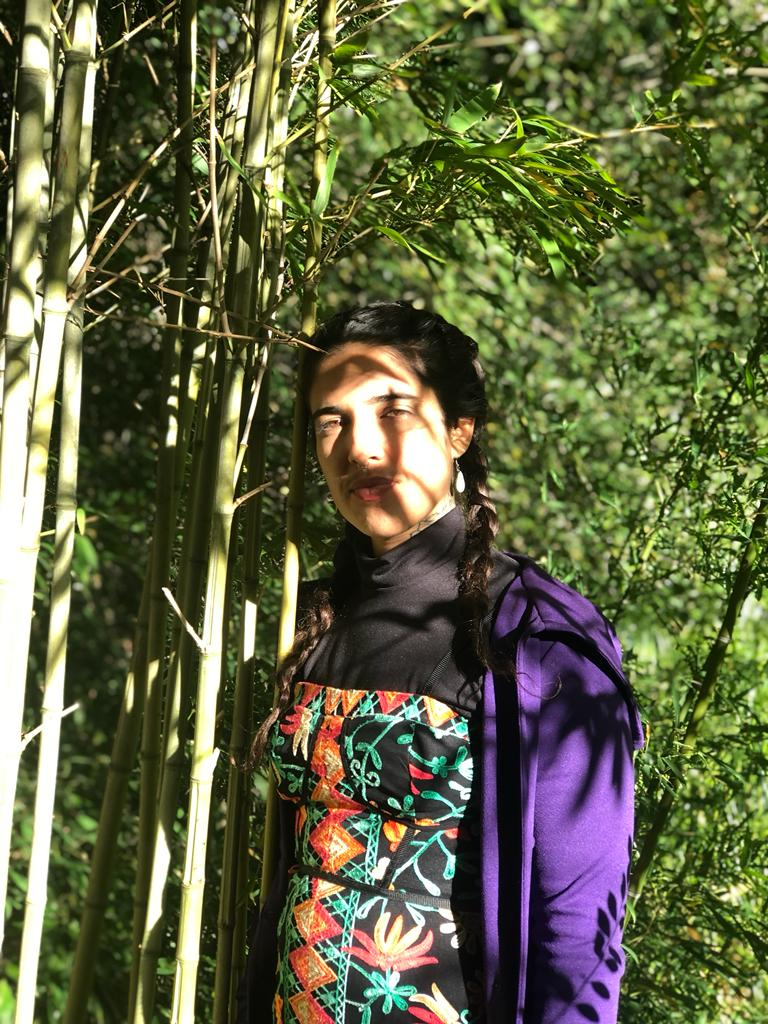
- Cantuária in 2023
- Born: 1991 (age 34–35); Rio de Janeiro, Brazil
- Education: Federal University of Rio de Janeiro
- Known for: Paintings
- Website: https://www.marcelacantuaria.com.br/

Marcela Cantuária (born in Rio de Janeiro, Brazil, 1991) is a Brazilian visual artist working primarily with paintings. Cantuária's work revolves around contemporary historical paintings produced in small and large formats. Recurring themes in her work are social movements, political history, feminisms, and environmental causes in Latin America.

Cantuária is a member of the Brazilian social organization Brigadas Populares. As of 2019, she lives in Rio de Janeiro.

== Education and career ==
Marcela Cantuária holds a bachelor's degree in painting from the School of Fine Arts at the Federal University of Rio de Janeiro (UFRJ). While as an undergraduate student, she was featured in solo and group shows at the university galleries, such as the IV EBA/UFRJ Biennial titled Reflexos (Reflexes), at the Museu Nacional de Belas Artes, in 2017.

In 2019, the artist opened two influential solo exhibitions securing a space within the contemporary art discourse around the country and abroad. In both Sutur|ar Libert|ar, at Centro Municipal de Arte Hélio Oiticica, curated by Joyce Delfim, and in Marcela Cantuária | La Larga Noche de los 500 años, organized by the gallery A Gentil Carioca, which represents the artist in Rio de Janeiro, commented on Cantuária's take on societal issues such as the colonial history and socioeconomic throwbacks in Brazil and Latin America. Through her visual narratives and pictorial language, she aims at drawing attention to issues of identity such as gender, race, and class.

The artist combines internet-based imagery, archival research, photographs, reproductions, and depictions of imaginative historical moments that honor everyday people and comment on the ongoing global struggle for women's rights.

In her multicolored chromatic palette, she uses vibrant warm colors with tonalities of hot pink, reds, yellows, and purples. Representations of anonymous and public figures are mixed in landscapes and compositions of figurative and intensely colorful nature. Women's political contributions to society are a constant topic in the artist's oeuvre. For instance, Berta Cáceres, Nise da Silveira, Marielle Franco, Deize Tigrona, Lúcia Maria de Souza, and Juana Azurduy are a few women who are visible in past canvases.

Her participation in major collective exhibitions started in 2019, in Histórias Feministas (2019) curated by Isabella Rjeille, at São Paulo Museum of Art, and Contramemória, co-curated by Lilia Moritz Schwarcz, at Theatro Municipal de São Paulo. MASP later acquired one of her paintings. Her work was featured in magazine and media outlets internationally such as Vogue Magazine, Claudia Magazine, ArteBrasileiros!, and major news outlets such as O Globo and Folha de São Paulo.

The 2020 publication Pensamento Feminista Hoje: Perspectivas Decoloniais (Feminist Thought Today: Decolonial Perspectives) organized by Heloisa Buarque de Hollanda, dedicates a chapter, Outras Línguas: Três artistas brasileiras (Other Languages: Three Brazilian Artists) to three intergenerational contemporary artists working in Brazil and exhibiting internationally today. The author expands on Marcela Cantuária's work and positions it next to Adriana Varejão and Rosana Paulino. The text contextualizes common themes intersecting their practices: histories of oppression and erasure against women.

In 2022, she created the public murals Caju e Manatí in collaboration with local communities in Cajueiro da Praia, in Piauí. The goal was to increase environmental awareness in the region.

Recent one-person exhibitions Propostas de Reencantamento (Proposals for Reenchantment), in São Paulo; La invocación del pasado a la velocidad del ahora (The invocation of the past at the speed of the hour), in Madrid; and Figurar o Impossível, in Minas Gerais, continues to sustain her scheme of symbols, images, and geographies by reanimating stories left on the margins of the traditional art historical narrative. Centered on feminist perspectives, she aims to amplify social movements in Latin America and the Caribbean.

== Critical reception ==
Marcela Cantuária is presenting her first international solo exhibition at Pérez Art Museum Miami, in the United States in 2023. Titled Marcela Cantuária: The South American Dream, and organized by Jennifer Inacio, associate curator at PAMM. The exhibition expands on class struggles and the experience of female leaders across the Americas.

In 2021, Cantuária was invited to develop the visual concept for the album "Portas" by Brazilian singer-songwriter Marisa Monte. For the project, the artist produced thirteen doors and a 7 feet tall oratory based on Monte's compositions. The creation of "Portas" reached international audiences through its wide social media spread as it was also used as a set design in Marisa Monte's international tour, which travelled through several cities in the Americas and Europe.

== Solo exhibitions ==
- 2023 - Marcela Cantuária: The South American Dream, Pérez Art Museum Miami
- 2023 - Bestiário, Palácio do Grilo, Lisbon, Portugal
- 2022 - Marcela Cantuária: Propostas de Reencantamento, 2022. Sesc Pompeia, São Paulo
- 2022 - La invocación del pasado a la velocidad del ahora. CentroCentro, Madrid, Spain
- 2020 - Figurar o Impossível, 2020. Palácio das Artes, Belo Horizonte, Minas Gerais
- 2019 - La larga noche de los 500 años. A Gentil Carioca, Rio de Janeiro
- 2019 - Sutur|ar Libert|ar. Centro Municipal de Arte Hélio Oiticica, Rio de Janeiro
- 2018 - Castelos no Ar. Alfinete Galeria, Brasília
- 2017 - Lampejos. Galeria Macunaíma, School of Fine Arts at Federal University of Rio de Janeiro
- 2013 - Impulsos. Espaço Vórtice, School of Fine Arts at Federal University of Rio de Janeiro

== Group exhibitions ==
- 2022 - Histórias brasileiras. São Paulo Museum of Art, São Paulo
- 2022 - Contramemória. Theatro Municipal de São Paulo
- 2022 - 8th Biennial of Painting: The 't' is Silent. Museum Dhondt-Dhaenens, Belgium
- 2022 - Atos de Revolta: outros imaginários sobre independência. Museum of Modern Art, Rio de Janeiro
- 2022 - Essa minha letra: Lima Barreto e os Modernismos Negros. Museu da História e da Cultura Afro-Brasileira (MUHCAB), Rio de Janeiro
- 2022 - Espelho Labirinto. Centro Cultural Banco do Brasil, Brasília
- 2021 - Imagens que não se conformam. Museu de Arte do Rio (MAR)
- 2021 - Crônicas Cariocas. Museu de Arte do Rio (MAR)
- 2019 - Histórias Feministas: artistas depois de 2000. São Paulo Museum of Art (MASP)
- 2019 - Estratégias do Feminino. Farol Santander, Porto Alegre

== Awards and residencies ==
- 2022 - FountainHead. Miami, United States (residence)
- 2021 - Projeto Peixe-boi: Murais Caju e Manatí. Cajueiro da Praia, Piauí (residence and public art project)
- 2020 - 3o Prêmio de Artes Visuais Décio Noviello de Artes Visuais, Fundação Clóvis Salgado. Minas Gerais
- 2019 - Kaaysá. São Paulo (residence)
- 2019 - PAOS GDL. Guadalajara, Mexico (residence)
- 2018 - Solar dos Abacaxis. Rio de Janeiro (residence)

== Collections ==
Cantuária's work has been included in international collections in her native Brazil and the United States.

- Pérez Art Museum Miami, Florida
- Pinacoteca do Estado de São Paulo, São Paulo
- São Paulo Museum of Art (MASP), São Paulo
- Museu de Maré, Rio de Janeiro
