= Marcela Lucatelli =

Brazilian composer, director, vocalist and performance artist

Marcela Lucatelli (born 13 April 1988) is a Brazilian composer, director, vocalist and performance artist.

== Biography ==
Lucatelli was born in São Paulo, Brazil, in a family of Italian origins. She studied composition at the Danish National Academy of Music, the Royal Danish Academy of Music and the Danish National School of Performing Arts. She is known for writing "scores for the limits of bodies and voice". Her works have been performed by vocal groups such as the Danish National Vocal Ensemble and Neue Vocalsolisten Stuttgart, together with ensembles such as Apartment House, Bastard Assignments and Mocrep. Her works have been premiered at Donaueschinger Musiktage, Darmstadt Internationale Ferienkurse für Neue Musik, Nordic Music Days, KLANG - Copenhagen Avantgarde Music Festival, SPOR Festival, Copenhagen Jazz Festival, AllEars Festival for Improvised Music, FILE - Electronic Language International Festival, WOMEX, among other festivals and events worldwide, including contemporary art museums such as Nikolaj Kunsthal, ARKEN and Henie Onstad Art Center. Her music has also been streamed by several national radios, including DR P2, BBC 3 and NRK.

Lucatelli's vocals have been described as "inhuman human noise" and her visual expression as "scary and breathtaking". She has been praised for her convincing technique and natural stage presence as an authority. Her work ISYCH, das Moment – or how to describe atomic habits (2019) was described as a Gesamtkunstwerk that "romped through the academic, the popular, the cutting, the banal, the theatrical, the zoological, the unfathomably brilliant, the obfuscatingly bizarre and the rib-ticklingly entertaining". Her aesthetics has been pointed out as a new musical direction to search and new impulses to embed in the music concept.

The cancellation of her first orchestral work, RGBW, shortly before the first performance sparked debate on social media and in Danish newspapers about whether Danish radio stations and orchestras give enough space to upcoming composers.

=== Recognition ===
In 2016, her performance work decant from 2013 was chosen as the official image for Nordic Music Days at Harpa, in Reykjavik. In 2019, Lucatelli was awarded the Carl Nielsen and Anne Marie Carl-Nielsen Foundation Talent Prize in Composition.

== Works ==
=== Stage works ===
- ISYCH, das moment - or how to describe atomic habits (2019) – music theatre
- Marcela Lucatelli's Brazilian Songbook (2019) – staged concert for ensemble
- Matryhoshka Dogs: The Outerquation (2018) – for viola d'amore, voice and electronics
- 23 stories on losing my breath (2018) – for voices, double bass and electronics
- now現在/决不never (2018) – for Chinese and western instruments
- IMPOSSIBLE PENETRATIONS (2018) – music theatre
- Off-Off-Human (2017) – music theatre
- Off-Human (2017) – music theatre
- this is a piece not a WHOL (2016) – for ensemble and electronics
- curandeihits (2015) – staged concert for ensemble
- THE UNAWAITED (2015) – staged concert for voice and electronics
- Ø (2014) – staged concert for children, ensemble and electronics
- XXXPM:LYS(T) (2014) – music theatre
- KapSulaZer0 (2013) – music theatre
- Carnival in a pulse without body (Marcela Lucatelli e o Kollectivo Squizophoniko) (2012) – staged concert for ensemble and narrator
- CICLO (2012)– staged concert for children, ensemble and electronics
- THE ASTROGALACTIC NOISE PARTY (2010) – staged concert for ensemble

=== Orchestra works ===
- RGBW (2019) – for soloist and orchestra

=== Ensemble works ===
- The Golden Days (2018) – for vocal ensemble
- WROTTEN (2018) – for ensemble and electronics
- asteroid 433 Eros (2015) – for ensemble and electronics
- Veritas Sanitas Vanitas (Going Somewhere?) (2015) – for ensemble and electronics
- TUNING TIME (2014) – for ensemble and narrator
- KompensaÇão (2010) – for boys' choir and percussion

=== Chamber works ===
- Four Lilith Valses (2019) – for piano
- A Fairly Tale (2018) – for five voices
- Listen to Ladies (2018) – for acoustic guitar, horn and soprano saxophone
- (meetings unplanned) (2017) – for flute, clarinet, alto saxophone and electric guitar
- Family Portraits (2017) – for voice, viola and horn
- self-help etude nr.1 or variations on skylark motel (2017) – for solo cello
- (I shall lick your teeth while you) project me a heart supply (2015) – for voice and electronics
- AFBRÆK÷ 1 (2014) – for solo recorder
- Dois (2011) – for voice, alto flute, alto saxophone and bass clarinet
- Samba a doze (2010) – for voice and piano

=== Solo performances ===
- Snow Off-White (2019) – solo performance
- Run, Run, Run (2019) – solo performance
- This is all about (2018) – solo performance
- permission to love beauty (2018) – video-performance
- Speech of Maria Magdalena to her legions (2018) - for solo performer and electronics
- analysis #0.1 (2017) – solo performance
- In-Yer-Face (2016) – for solo performer and electronics
- aim/‘mnot/me - prove you're not a robot (2016) – for solo performer, piano and electronics
- de-cant (2013/2015) – for solo performer and electronics
- pó de marfim (2013) – for solo performer and electronics

=== Installation works ===
- Griefs 'n Tapes (2020) – video series
- A Philosopher Ought to Converse Especially with Men in Power (2020) – virtual installation
- even sunday (2014) – for solo performer and electronics
- STØVRIGET (2012) – installation
- Fishing dance, fishing music (2011) – for flute, tenor saxophone, bassoon, tuba and narrator
- Translation (2011) – installation

== Discography ==
=== Albums ===
- ANEW (2020, online release, no label, DK)
- PHEW! - The Last Guide for a Western Obituary (2016, two-sided 12", no label, DK)
- *Gestus Kanto-GlyTkH* (2013, online release, no label, BR)

=== EPs ===
- ORAL (2018, two-sided 10", no label, DK)
- EHM (2017, two-sided 10", no label, DK)

=== Compilations' features ===
- I want you hot (at Brain Pussyfication Sampler III, 2018, cassette, no label, DE)
- A Piece for You to Choose (at Sabá: Conexão Rakta, 2016, cassette, no label, BR)
- Even Sunday (at Hystereofônica Vol. 1, 2016, online release, BR)
