= Alfredo Volpi =

Brazilian painter (1896–1988)

- Born: April 14, 1896; Lucca, Italy
- Died: April 28, 1988 (aged 92); São Paulo, Brazil
- Movement: Modernism
- Awards: São Paulo Art Biennial; 1953 Best National Painter

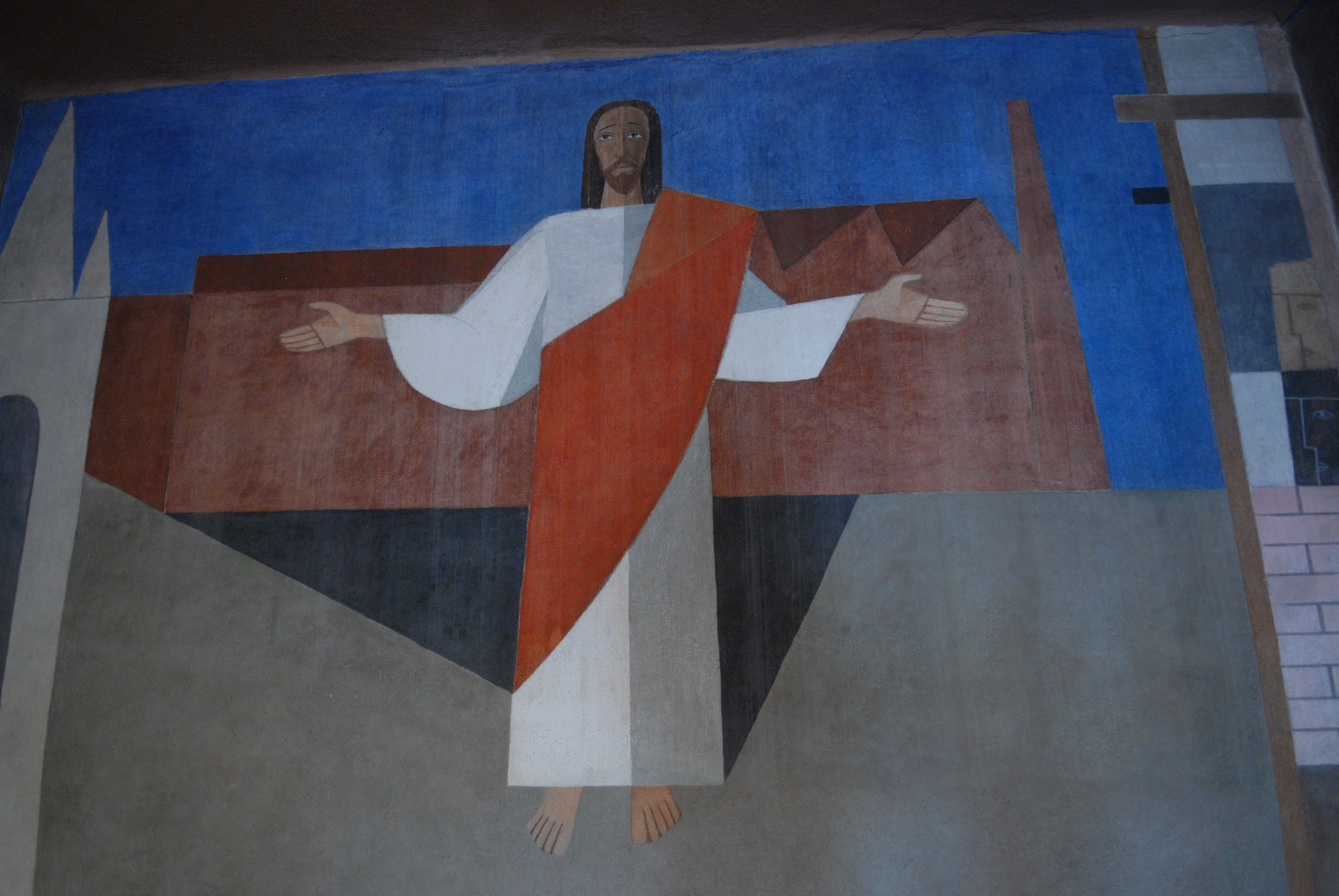
Jesus Christ, painted by Alfredo Volpi.

Alfredo Volpi (April 14, 1896 – May 28, 1988), was a prominent painter of the artistic and cultural Brazilian modernist movement. He was born in Lucca, Italy but, less than two years later, he was brought by his parents to São Paulo, Brazil, became a Brazilian citizen, and lived there for the majority of his life. He was one of the most important artists of the so-called Grupo Santa Helena, formed in the 1930s with Francisco Rebolo, Clóvis Graciano, Mario Zanini, Fulvio Pennacchi, and others.

== Early period ==
Volpi was a self-taught painter, producing his first naturalist painting in 1914 at the age of twelve. Although his first paintings could resemble, in some way, those of expressionist artists, (an early influence was the Brazilian landscape painter Ernesto de Fiori). Mogi das Cruzes, a landscape painted for a patron in 1939, is a representative work of this period. He soon focused into a most peculiar style, using geometric abstract forms and switching from oil paint to tempera. Volpi's first one-man exhibition was held at the Itá Gallery in São Paulo in 1944.

== Later career ==
Volpi started painting façades of houses in a highly stylized and colorful manner (these paintings were later named the "historical façades" by art critics) and this recurrent theme became pervasive all through the 1950s, after a brief "concretist" period (even though the artist himself never acknowledged being part of the concretist movement as such). The 1960s witnessed the development of his trademark "bandeirinhas" (small flags) for which Volpi became famous and which originated from Brazilian folklore (small flags are a regular fixture of the popular festa junina, held every year during the month of June): the artist would use the small-flag pattern to show an increasing sense of color combination and balanced composition which would eventually place him among the major Brazilian artists of his time.

The painter gained national renown with his participation at the second São Paulo Art Biennial, winning the Grand Prix for Brazilian painting, an award he shared with Di Cavalcanti. Di Cavalcanti publicly dismissed Volpi's art as being that of a "flag painter". Soon he became known as one of the most important 20th century painters in Brazil.

Recent exhibitions (MAM São Paulo 2006, Curitiba 2007) have shown how Volpi, far from being the isolated self-made artist he was once thought to be, actually absorbed various influences during his career, especially that of Josef Albers. His use of the ancient tempera technique also shows a knowledge of the Italian Renaissance painters.

== Selected works ==
- Mogi das Cruzes (1939)
- Seaside (1940)
- Frescoes for the Chapel of Our Lady of Fátima (1958)
- Frescoes for Palácio dos Arcos, Brasília (1966)
- Bandeirinhas (1950)
- Panel of church of Cristo Operário (1951)
- Night Façade (1955)
- Untitled (from the Hourglass series) at the Museum of Modern Art, 1964
- Kinetic Composition (1970)
- The Discovery of America

== See also ==
- Francisco Rebolo
- Fulvio Pennacchi
- List of Brazilian painters
