= Humberto Rosa (painter) =

Brazilian artist (1908–1948)

Humberto Rosa (January 18, 1908 – 1948) was a Brazilian artist who worked in painting and drawing. He was part of the Grupo Santa Helena and the Família Artística Paulista (or "Artistic Family of São Paulo"), but is less known than other members. Unlike most other members, he was neither a proletarian nor an artisan; instead he earned his wage as a drawing teacher, and that was the job he had until the end of life.

Rosa was born in Sertãozinho. His family was of Italian immigrants. He started to work very early, giving a hand in his father warehouse. In 1927, he moved to São Paulo, when he started his studies in the Escola de Belas de São Paulo, or "School of Arts of São Paulo".

Due to his always frail health and consequent early death, at forty, he was not as productive as the other members of Santa Helena Group. Due to that many of his works were lost, others were dispersed spatially. So much as they became rare materials, precious the comprehension of artistic movements of the 1930s and 1940s artistic movements. He died in São Paulo.

His works, particularly the landscapes, record his countryside origin, and the life in the fast-growing São Paulo city.

== See also ==
- List of Brazilian painters
