= Aldo Locatelli =

Italian painter

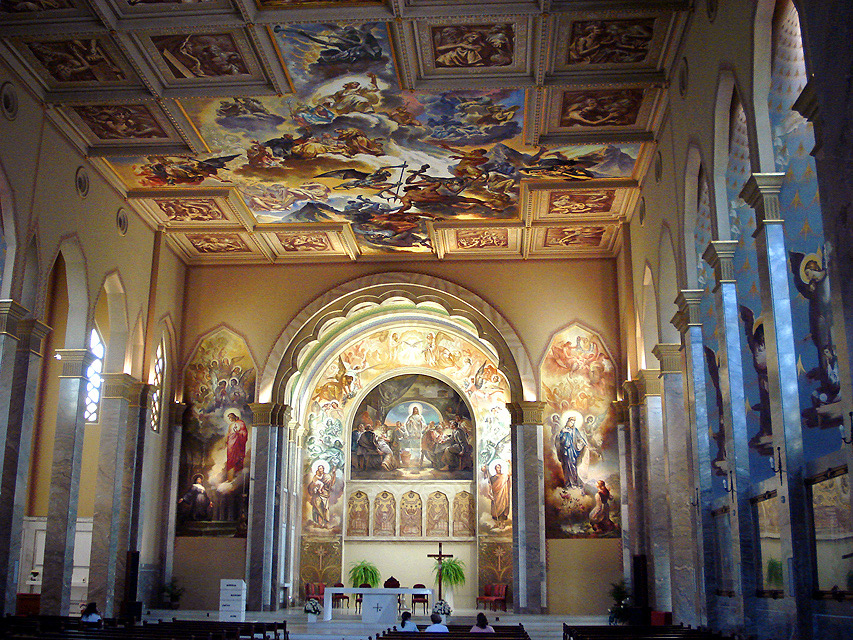
Interior of the São Pelegrino's Church in Caxias do Sul.

Aldo Locatelli (Bergamo, August 18, 1915 – Porto Alegre, September 3, 1962) was an Italian painter. His most important works are the frescos and panels in churches and public buildings of Rio Grande do Sul.

Locatelli was born in northern Italy and was interested in art from an early age. In 1948, he went to Brazil at the invitation of Don Antonio Zattera, bishop of Pelotas, Rio Grande do Sul, to paint the Cathedral San Francisco de Paula de Pelotas. At that time, he was working in the cathedral of Genoa, Italy.

The frescoes in the Cathedral of Pelotas and stations of the Cross in the Church of San Pelegrini in Caxias do Sul, which took ten years to complete, are considered his greatest works.

His last work was the painting of the Sacred Heart of Jesus, which was unfinished because of his death.

== Gallery ==
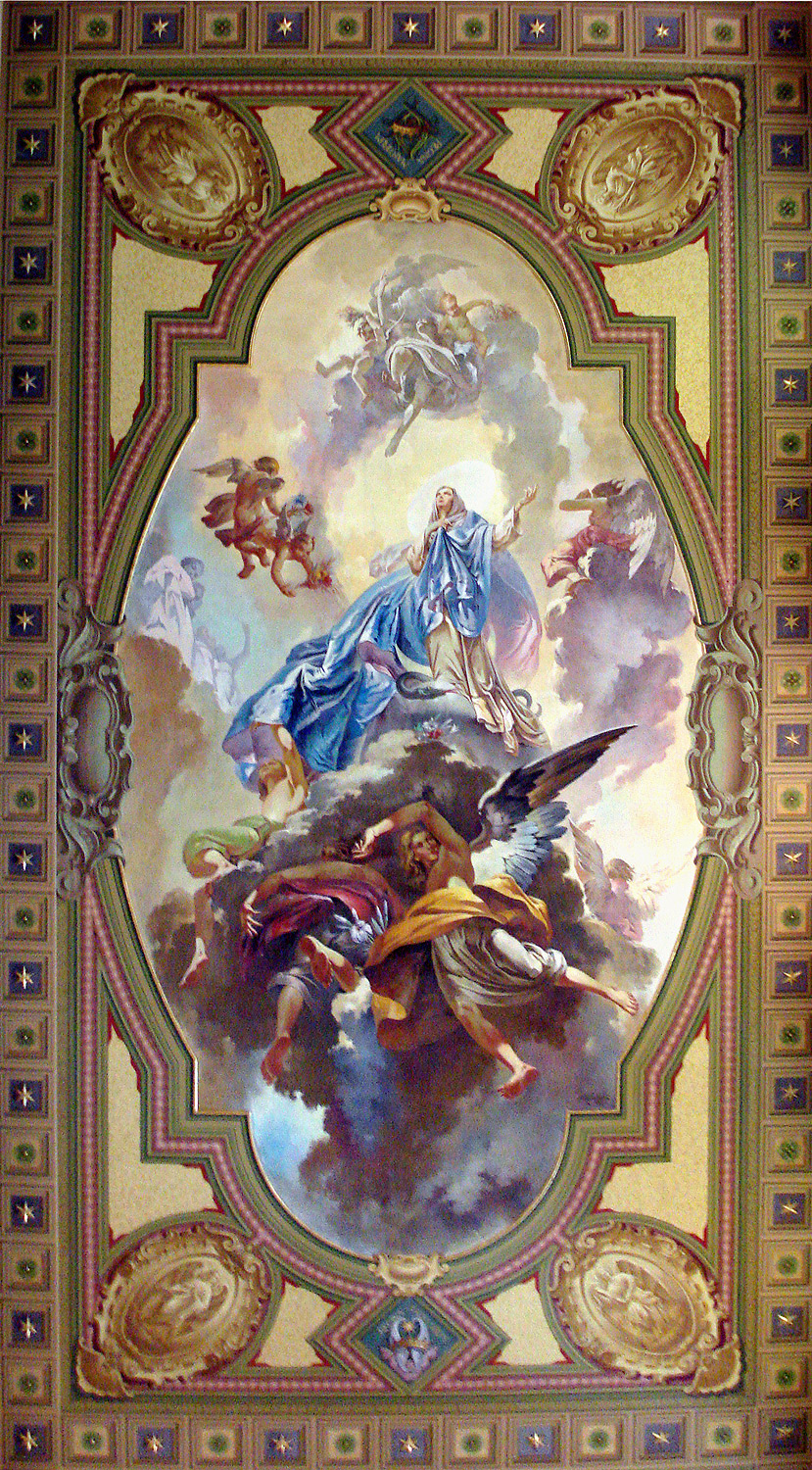
Immaculate Conception

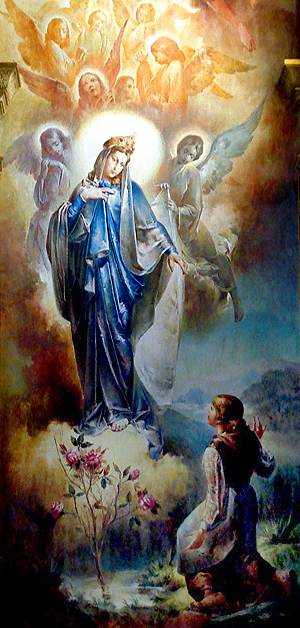
Our Lady of Caravaggio

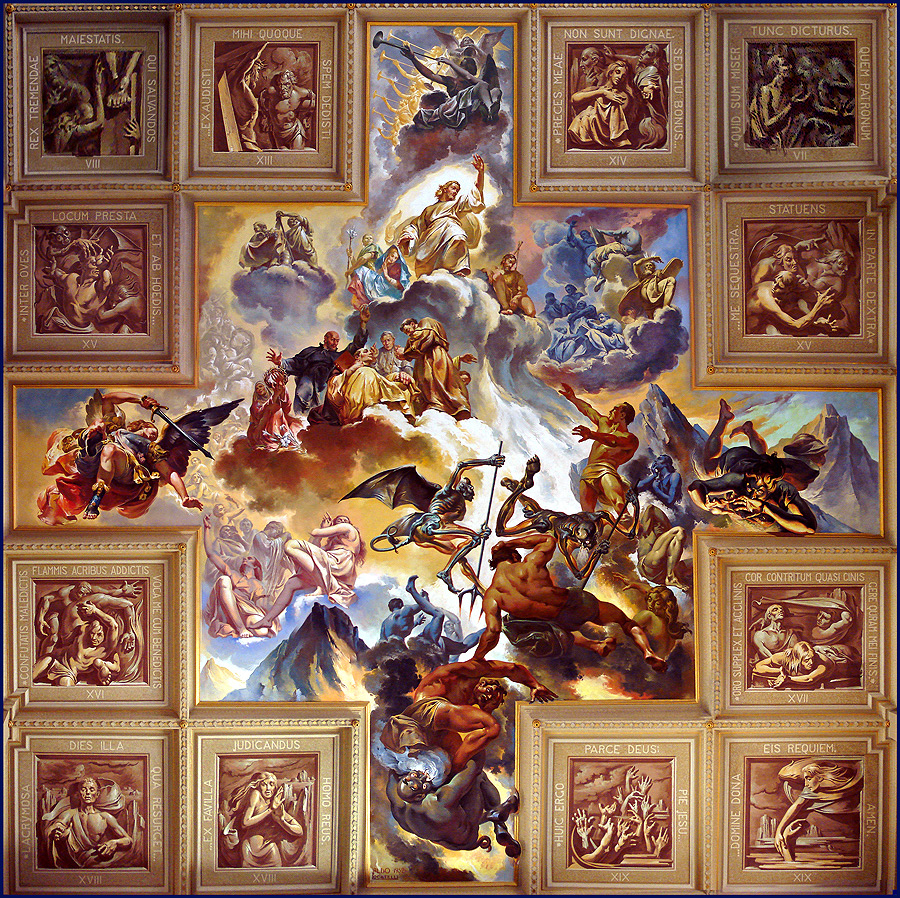
Last judgement

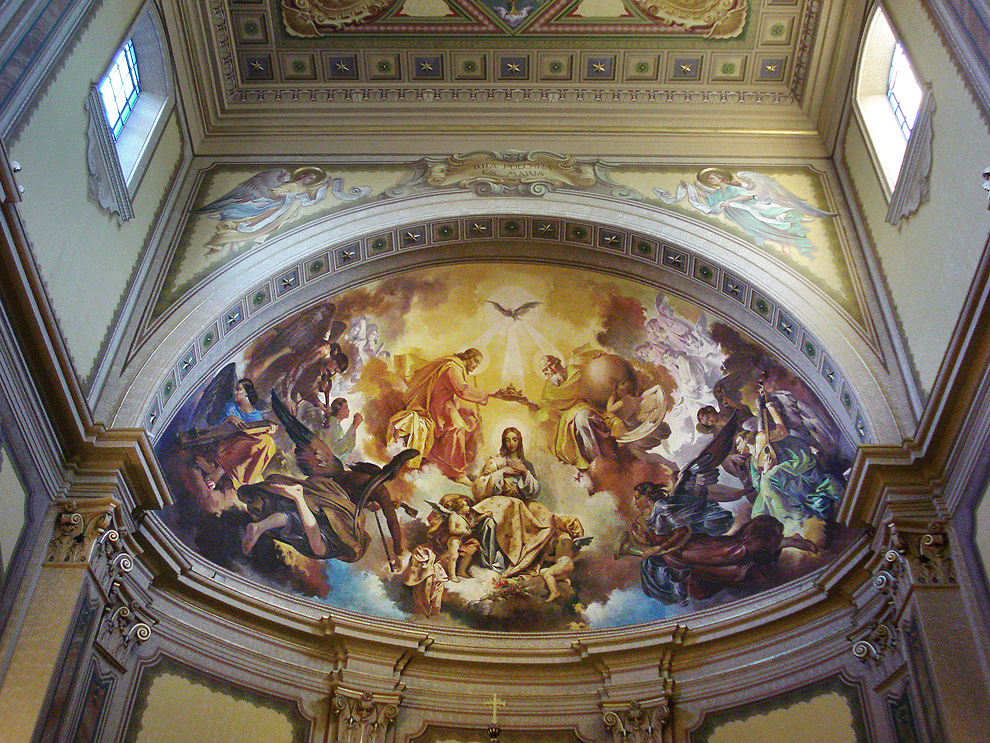
Coronation of the Virgin

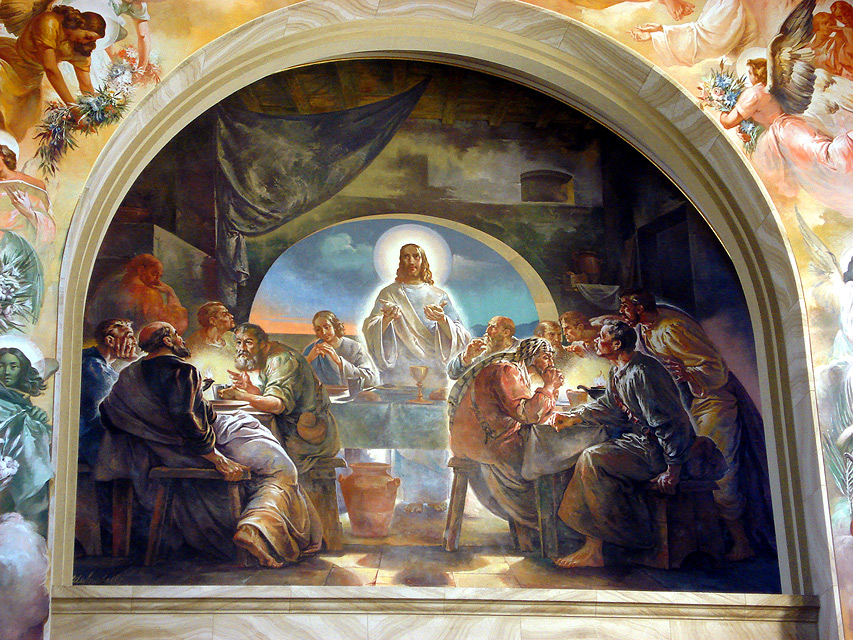
Last Supper

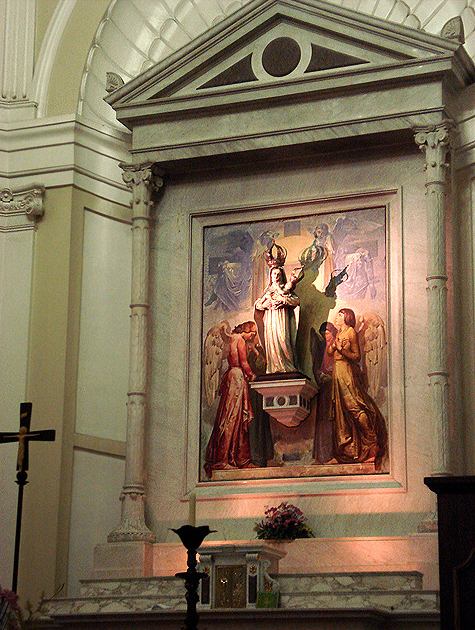
Church altar
