= Alfredo Rizzotti =

Brazilian artist

Alfredo Rullo Rizzotti, generally known as Alfredo Rizzotti (Serrana (São Paulo state) August 15, 1909 — São Paulo May 12, 1972) was a Brazilian artist, that worked with painting, drawing and interior design.

== See also ==
- List of Brazilian painters
