= Mario Zanini =

Brazilian painter and interior designer

Mario Zanini, or simply Zanini (September 10, 1907, in São Paulo – August 16, 1971, in São Paulo), was a Brazilian painter and interior designer.

He was born in a humble family. As a teenager he studied in the Escola de Belas de São Paulo, or "School of Arts of São Paulo". He ran for the major art prizes of the country. He travelled to Europe in 1950 for studying he also was in the first three São Paulo Art Biennials.

He was part of the Grupo Santa Helena, that would be a nucleus for the Família Artística Paulista, or "Artistic Family of São Paulo". What distinguishes him from the average integrants of the Grupo do Santa Helena and the Família Artística Paulista were his deep, intense colors, almost naive. He and Alfredo Volpi were the great masters of color in the Brazilian painting history.

== See also ==
- List of Brazilian painters
